= Protected areas of Kyrgyzstan =

The Protected areas of Kyrgyzstan are regulated by the law on specially protected natural areas of 2 May 2011, last modified on 2 June 2018. In total, they cover 14,761.216 km^{2} (5,699.337 sq mi) and account for 7.38% of the country's total area (as of 2017). The first protected area in Kyrgyzstan (Issyk-Kul) was established in 1948. According to the Government Decree on Priorities of Conservation of Biological Diversity and the relevant Action Plan for 2014-2024 the target area for the protected areas in Kyrgyzstan is 10 percent of the country’s area by 2024.

The protected areas are subdivided into seven categories:

Category	IUCN category	Number	Total area (km^{2})
Nature Reserve	Ia	10	5,099.527
Nature Park	II	13	7,246.702
Geological Reserve	III	19	1.00
Integrated Reserve	IV	2	101.42
Botanical Reserve	IV	23	61.154
Game Reserve	IV	12	2,223.25
Forest Reserve	IV	8	28.163

== Nature Reserves ==
The Nature Reserves (Kyrgyz: жаратылыш коругу, Russian: природный заповедник) are the strictest protected areas, in which little human activity is allowed. As of 2017, there were 10 nature reserves:

Nature Reserve	Established	Region	District	Area (km^{2})	Remarks
Besh-Aral	21 March 1979	Jalal-Abad	Chatkal	1,124.633	Conservation of the habitat of the Menzbier's Marmot and protection of West Tien-Shan flora
Dashman	12 July 2012	Jalal-Abad	Bazar-Korgon	79.581	
Issyk-Kul	10 December 1948	Issyk-Kul	Issyk-Kul	189.990	Conservation of Ramsar wetlands
Karatal-Japyryk	1 March 1994	Naryn	Naryn	363.926	
Kulun-Ata	11 August 2004	Osh	Kara-Kulja	274.340	
Naryn	29 December 1983	Naryn	Naryn	369.690	
Padysha-Ata	3 July 2003	Jalal-Abad	Aksy	305.564	
Sarychat-Eertash	10 March 1995	Issyk-Kul	Jeti-Ögüz	1,491.179	
Sary-Chelek	5 March 1959	Jalal-Abad	Aksy	238.680	Biosphere reserve, conservation of biodiversity and typical landscapes and unique Sary-Chelek Lake
Surmatash	27 June 2009	Batken	Kadamjay	661.944	

== Nature Parks ==
The Nature Parks (Kyrgyz: жаратылыш паркы, Russian: природный парк) are IUCN Category II protected areas. In contrast to the nature reserves, recreational uses are permitted in nature parks. As of 2017, there were 13 nature parks:

Nature Park	Established	Region	District	Area (km^{2})
Ala-Archa	1976	Chüy	Alamüdün	164.845
Alatay	2016	Jalal-Abad	Toktogul	568.264
Besh-Tash	1996	Talas	Talas	137.315
Chong-Kemin	1997	Chüy	Kemin	1,236.540
Kan-Achuu	2015	Jalal-Abad	Toguz-Toro	304.965
Kara-Buura	2013	Talas	Kara-Buura	615.439
Karakol	1997	Issyk-Kul	Karakol	380.953
Kara-Shoro	1996	Osh	Özgön	144.402
Khan-Tengiri	2016	Issyk-Kul	Ak-Suu	2,758.003
Kyrgyz-Ata	1992	Osh	Nookat	111.720
Salkyn-Tör	2001	Naryn	Naryn	104.190
Sarkent	2009	Batken	Leylek	399.994
Saymaluu-Tash	2001	Jalal-Abad	Toguz-Toro	320.072

== Natural Monuments ==
There are 19 official natural monuments (IUCN Category III) (Kyrgyz: жаратылыш эстелиги, Russian: памятник природы) or hydrogeological reserves (Kyrgyz: гидрогеологиялык заказник, Russian: гидрогеологический заказник) in Kyrgyzstan:

Natural Monument	Region	District
Abshir-Ata Waterfall	Osh	Nookat
Ajydaar-Üngkür (cave)	Osh	Nookat
Ala-Myshyk Cave	Naryn	Naryn
At-Bashy Canyon	Naryn	At-Bashy
Barskoon Waterfall	Issyk-Kul	Jeti-Ögüz
Big Gates Cave (Barite Cave)	Osh	Nookat
Chil-Mayram Cave (Beshüngkür)	Osh	Aravan
Chil-Ustun cave	Osh	Aravan
Dangi Canyon	Osh	Nookat
Jeti-Ögüz Rocks	Issyk-Kul	Jeti-Ögüz
Jiydeli Cave	Batken	Kadamjay
Kan-i-Gut cave	Batken	Batken
Kara-Jygach Rocks	Jalal-Abad	Aksy
Kögüchkön-Sugat Waterfall	Chüy	Alamüdün
Kök-Jerty Canyon	Naryn	Naryn
Sogon-Tash Cave	Jalal-Abad	Bazar-Korgon
Tegerek Waterfall	Jalal-Abad	Bazar-Korgon
Ysyk-Ata Waterfall	Chüy	Ysyk-Ata

== Reserves ==
=== Integrated Reserves ===
As of 2017, there were 2 integrated or complex reserves:

Integrated Reserve	Established	Region	District	Area (km^{2})
Ak-Suu	1971	Chüy	Moskva	76
Talas	1973	Talas	Bakay-Ata, Talas	1300

=== Botanical Reserves ===
As of 2017, there were 23 botanical reserves:

Botanical Reserve	Established	Region	District	Area (km^{2})
Almaly (Yablonevoye)	1978	Chüy	Jayyl	1.0
Aydarken (Khaydarken)	1975	Batken	Kadamjay	0.3
Aygül-Tash	2009	Batken	Batken	
Baydamtal	1975	Issyk-Kul	Tong	0.2
Chanach (Kanysh)	1975	Jalal-Abad	Ala-Buka	0.3
Chatkal		Jalal-Abad	Ala-Buka	
Chong-Aryk	1978	Chüy	Alamüdün	0.8
Chong-Kuurchak	1979	Chüy	Alamüdün	1.0
Chyrandy	1975	Batken	Kadamjay	5.0
Janggakty	1975	Batken	Leylek	0.8
Jel-Tiybes	1975	Jalal-Abad	Aksy	8.0
Kosh-Tektir	1975	Jalal-Abad	Ala-Buka	0.4
Kyrgyz-Ata	1975	Osh	Nookat	0.3
Kyrgyz-Gava	1975	Jalal-Abad	Bazar-Korgon	0.5
Maymak	1980	Talas	Kara-Buura	0.4
Ming-Kush	1984	Naryn	Jumgal	0.77
Oy-Kayyng	1975	Osh	Alay	0.5
Ryazan-Say		Jalal-Abad	Aksy	
Sary-Mogol	1975	Osh	Alay	0.6
Shilbili-Say	1980	Talas	Kara-Buura	1.0
Sülüktü	1975	Batken	Sülüktü (city)	0.3
Suusamyr	1990	Chüy	Jayyl	21.7
Tüp	1975	Issyk-Kul	Tüp	1.0

=== Game Reserves ===
Game Reserve	Established	Region	District	Area (km^{2})
Ak-Buura	1975	Osh	Kara-Suu	100
Chandalash	1975	Jalal-Abad	Chatkal	253
Chatyr-Köl	1972	Naryn	At-Bashy	1,900
Chychkan	1973	Jalal-Abad	Toktogul	360
Gülchö	1968	Osh	Alay	6.0
Jardy-Kayyngdy	1976	Chüy	Panfilov	87
Jargylchak	1990	Issyk-Kul	Jeti-Ögüz	230.98
Jazy	1975	Osh	Özgön	50
Jeti-Ögüz	1958	Issyk-Kul	Jeti-Ögüz	316.1
Keng-Suu	1990	Issyk-Kul	Tüp	87.12
Kochkor	1977	Naryn	Kochkor	20
Teploklyuchenka	1958	Issyk-Kul	Ak-Suu	322
Toguz-Toro	1977	Jalal-Abad	Toguz-Toro	50
Tüp	1976	Issyk-Kul	Tüp	150

=== Forest Reserves ===
Forest Reserve	Established	Region	District	Area (km^{2})
Baltyr-Khan	1975	Jalal-Abad	Aksy	3.04
Bülölü	1975	Osh	Alay	3.84
Iyri-Suu	1975	Naryn	Naryn	3.95
Jylgyndy	1975	Osh	Nookat	3.00
Kayyngdy	1977	Naryn	Naryn	1.00
Kichi Ak-Suu	1977	Issyk-Kul	Issyk-Kul	1.00
Kuru-Köl	1975	Jalal-Abad	Ala-Buka	3.48
Miskin-Say	1975	Jalal-Abad	Ala-Buka	4.83
Uzun-Akmat	1977	Jalal-Abad	Toktogul	5.00
