= Kongur =

Kongur can refer to:

- Kongur, Hınıs, a neighbourhood in Hınıs District, Erzurum Province, Turkey
- Kongur Tagh, a mountain to the north of the Tibetan Plateau
- Kongur wetland, located in Tirupur District, Tamil Nadu, India
- Kongur-Ölöng, village in the Issyk-Kul Region of Kyrgyzstan
- Kongur, a mountain peak in Belasica on the border of Bulgaria and Greece
  - Kongur Hut, a mountain hut in Bulgaria below the peak
  - Kongur Glacier, Antarctica, named after the peak
