= Tuura-Suu =

Tuura-Suu Туура-Суу
- Location within Kyrgyzstan
- Coordinates: 42.1400826°N 76.3223181°E
- Country: Kyrgyzstan
- Region: Issyk-Kul Region
- District: Tong District
- Elevation: 2,216 m (7,270 ft)

Population (2021)
  - Total: 868
- Time zone: UTC+6

Tuura-Suu is a village in the Issyk-Kul Region of Kyrgyzstan. It is part of the Ulakol rural community within the Tong District. Its population was 868 in 2021. Located 60 km far from Bakykchy if you coming from east and 65 km from Bökönbaev if you coming from west. On both options you can take tern towards mountains from village Kara- Talaa. In Tong District two villages with similar name Tuura-Suu, which may cause confusion with directions.
