= Kyzyl-Tuu, Issyk Kul =

Kyzyl-Tuu Кызыл-Туу
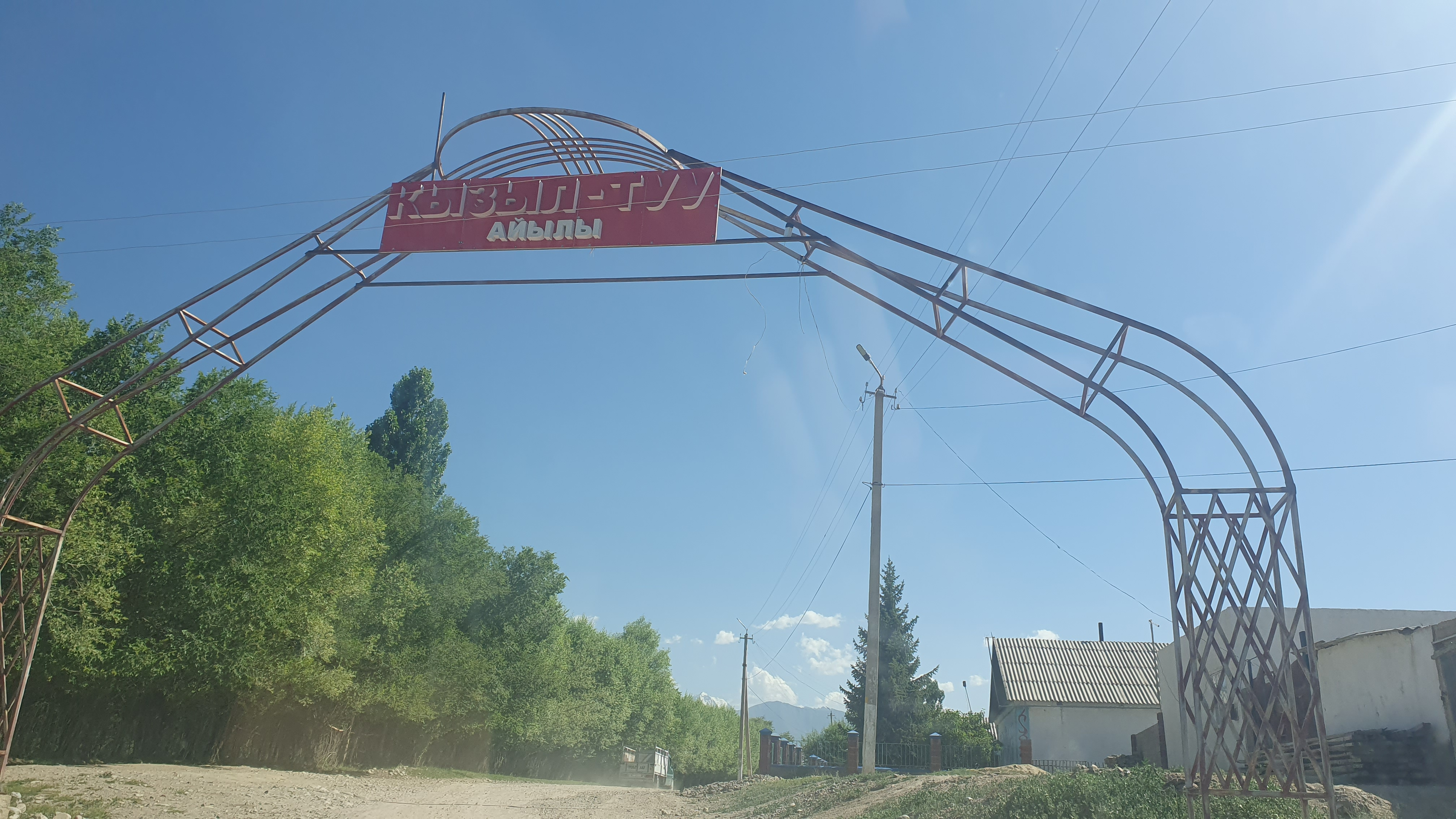

- Location within Kyrgyzstan
- Coordinates: 42°11′6″N 76°40′22.8″E
- Country: Kyrgyzstan
- Region: Issyk-Kul Region
- District: Tong District

Population (2021)
  - Total: 1,703

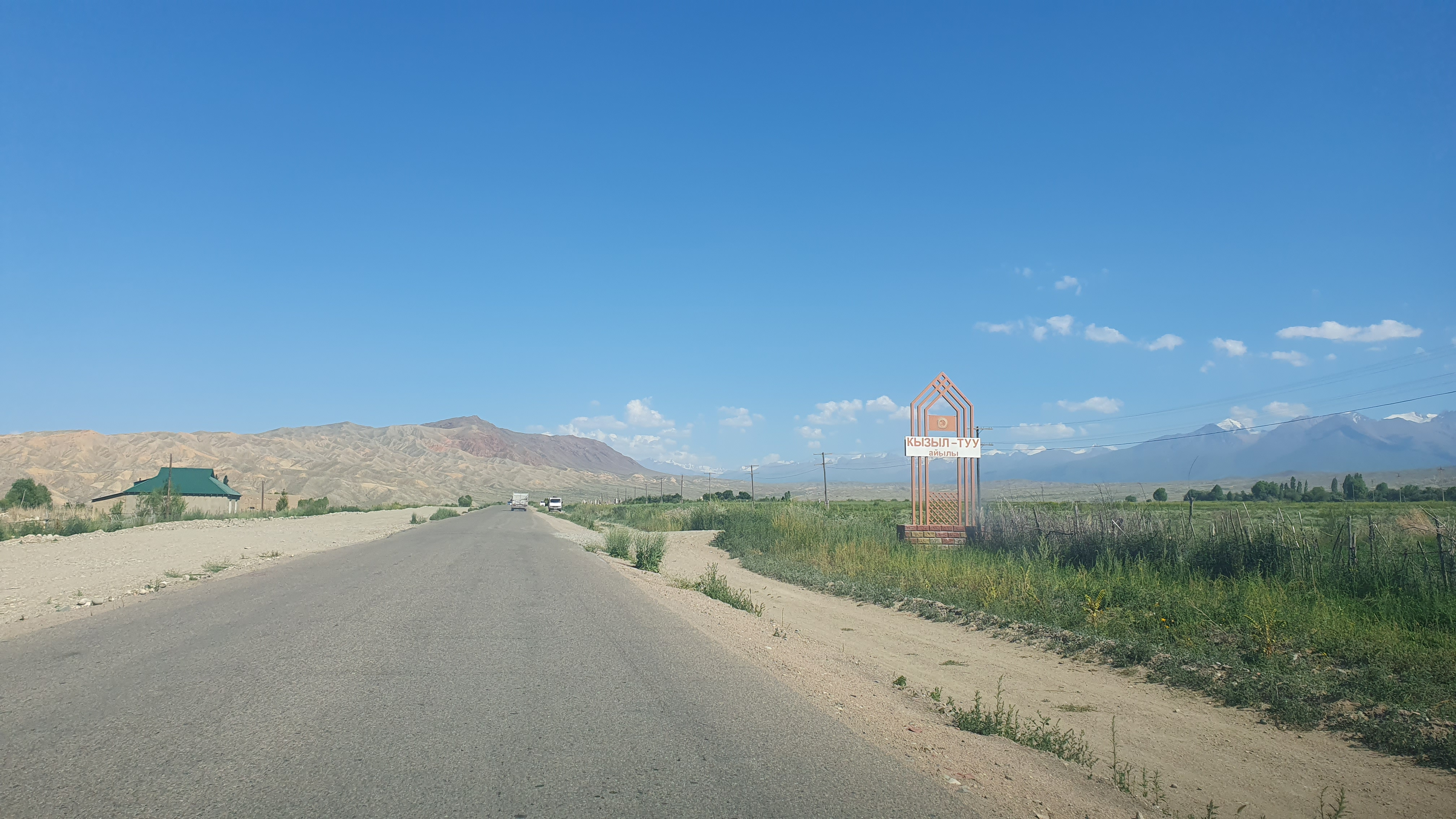

Kyzyl-Tuu, is a village in the Tong District of Issyk-Kul Region in Kyrgyzstan. It belongs to the Ak-Terek rural district. Located at an altitude of 1,800 meters above sea level. The district center, Bökönbaev, is 28 km to the east. It is 60 km from the Balykchy railway station. The village was founded in 1930, with a Population: of 1,703 people (2021); primarily engaged in livestock farming. There is a secondary school, library, and a rural medical point (FAP). The village is the birthplace of Kyshtak Mukasheva.
