= Baydamtal Botanical Reserve =

- Location within Kyrgyzstan
- Location: Tong District, Issyk-Kul Region, Kyrgyzstan
- Coordinates: 42°27′N 75°56′E
- Area: 20 ha (49 acres)
- Established: 1975

The Baydamtal Botanical Reserve (Kyrgyz: Байдамтал ботаникалык заказниги) is located in Tong District of Issyk-Kul Region of Kyrgyzstan. It is situated in the Boom Gorge along the river Chu, between Kök-Moynok-1 and the river Baydamtal. It was established in 1975 with a purpose of conservation of Nitraria schoberi L., Nitraria sibirica Pall., and Halimodendron halodendron Pall. Vegetation in the reserve is sparse. The botanical reserve occupies 20 hectares. Among other flora species inhabiting the reserve are Artemisia tianschanica, Festuca valesiaca Schleich. ex Gaudin, Agropyron cristatum (L.) Gaertn., Astragalus albertii Bunge, etc.
