= Keng-Suu Game Reserve =

Game reserve in Kyrgyzstan

- IUCN category IV (habitat/species management area)
- Location within Kyrgyzstan
- Location: Tüp District, Issyk-Kul Region, Kyrgyzstan
- Coordinates: 42°48′N 78°44′E
- Area: 8,712 ha (21,530 acres)
- Established: 20 June 1990

Keng-Suu Game Reserve (Kyrgyz: Кең-Суу зоологиялык (аң уулоочу) заказниги) is a protected area in Tüp District, Issyk-Kul Region, Kyrgyzstan. Established on 20 June 1990, it covers 8,712 ha (21,530 acres) and was created to protect wild animals and their habitats.

== History ==
The reserve was established by Resolution No. 187 of the Council of Ministers of the Kirghiz SSR on 20 June 1990. The same resolution established Jargylchak Game Reserve in Jeti-Ögüz District.

The reserve was designated as being of republican significance and placed under the forestry association Kirgizles, with day-to-day management assigned to its Issyk-Kul hunting enterprise.

== Wildlife and protection ==
The reserve was created to protect and restore populations of game animals, including species listed in the Red Data Book of the Kirghiz SSR. Its founding regulations named the maral, Tian Shan brown bear, Pallas's cat, snow leopard, golden eagle and bearded vulture among the animals it was intended to protect.

The 1990 regulations provided for the protection of wildlife habitats alongside forestry and livestock grazing. They prohibited hunting and the destruction of dens, nests and eggs, and provided for permanent and seasonal quiet zones to reduce disturbance during breeding.
