= Köl-Tör =

Köl-Tör Көл-Төр
- Location within Kyrgyzstan
- Coordinates: 42°05′26″N 76°39′54″E
- Country: Kyrgyzstan
- Region: Issyk-Kul Region
- District: Tong District
- Elevation: 1,940 m (6,360 ft)

Population (2021)
  - Total: 1,139
- Time zone: UTC+6

Köl-Tör (Kyrgyz: Көл-Төр) is a village in the Issyk-Kul Region of Kyrgyzstan. It is part of the Köl-Tör rural community within the Tong District. Its population was 1,139 in 2021.
