= Döng-Talaa =

Döng-Talaa Дөң-Талаа
- Location within Kyrgyzstan
- Coordinates: 42°7′12″N 76°34′48″E
- Country: Kyrgyzstan
- Region: Issyk-Kul Region
- District: Tong District
- Elevation: 1,947 m (6,388 ft)

Population (2021)
  - Total: 1,055
- Time zone: UTC+6

Döng-Talaa is a village in the Issyk-Kul Region of Kyrgyzstan. It is part of the Tong District. In 2021, it had a population of 1,055.
