= Tört-Kül, Issyk Kul =

Tört-Kül Төрт-Күл
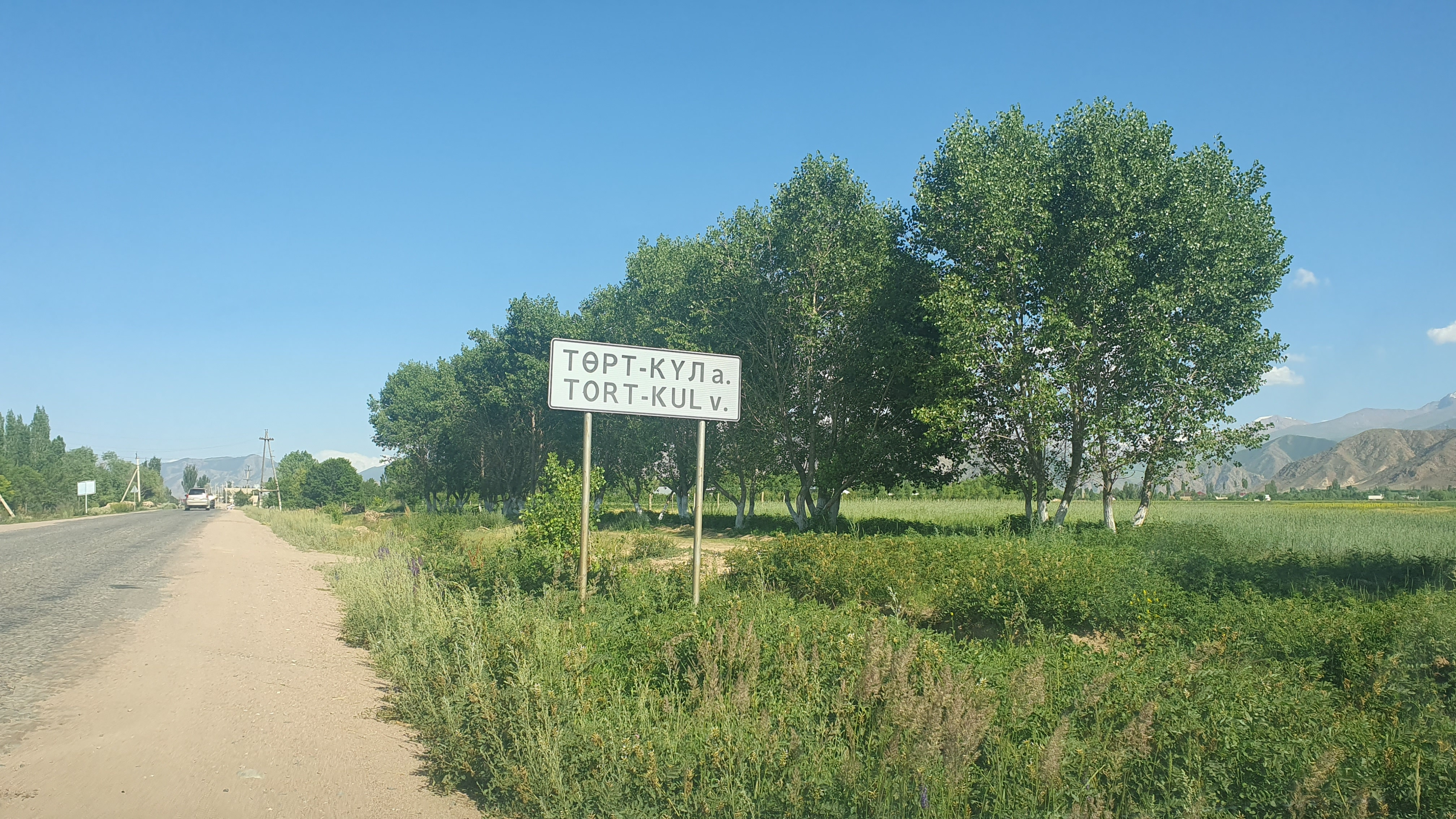

- Location within Kyrgyzstan
- Coordinates: 42°6′0″N 76°56′24″E
- Country: Kyrgyzstan
- Region: Issyk-Kul Region
- District: Tong District
- Elevation: 1,796 m (5,892 ft)

Population (2021)
  - Total: 4,825
- Time zone: UTC+6

Tört-Kül (Kyrgyz: Төрт-Күл) is a village in the Issyk-Kul Region of Kyrgyzstan. It is part of the Tong District. Its population was 4,825 in 2021.

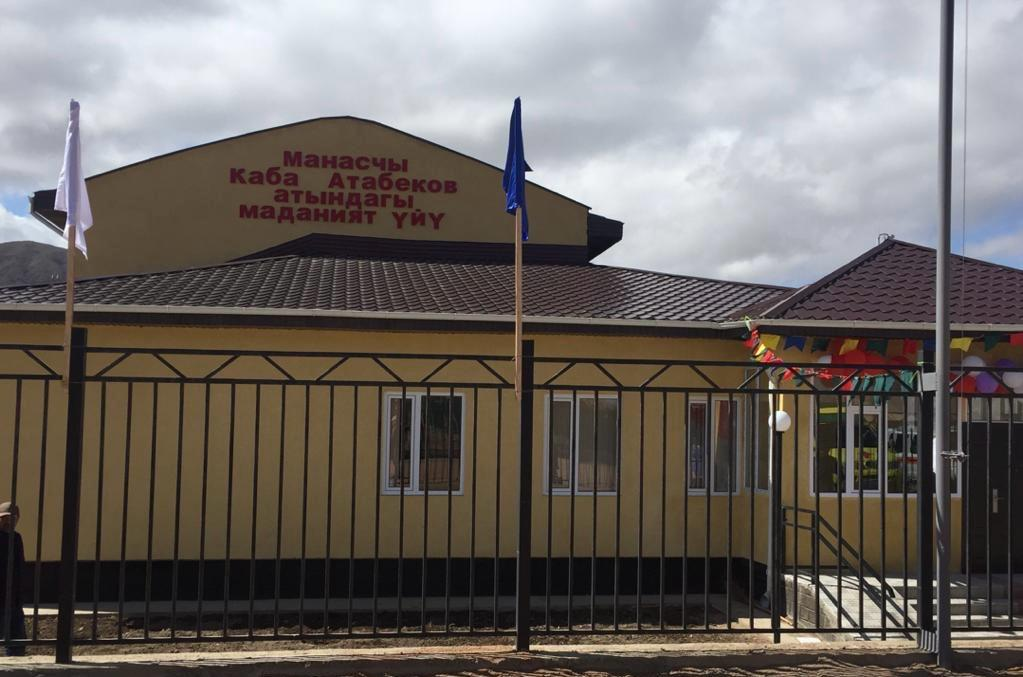
Cultural Center of manaschi-teller Kaba Atabekov.

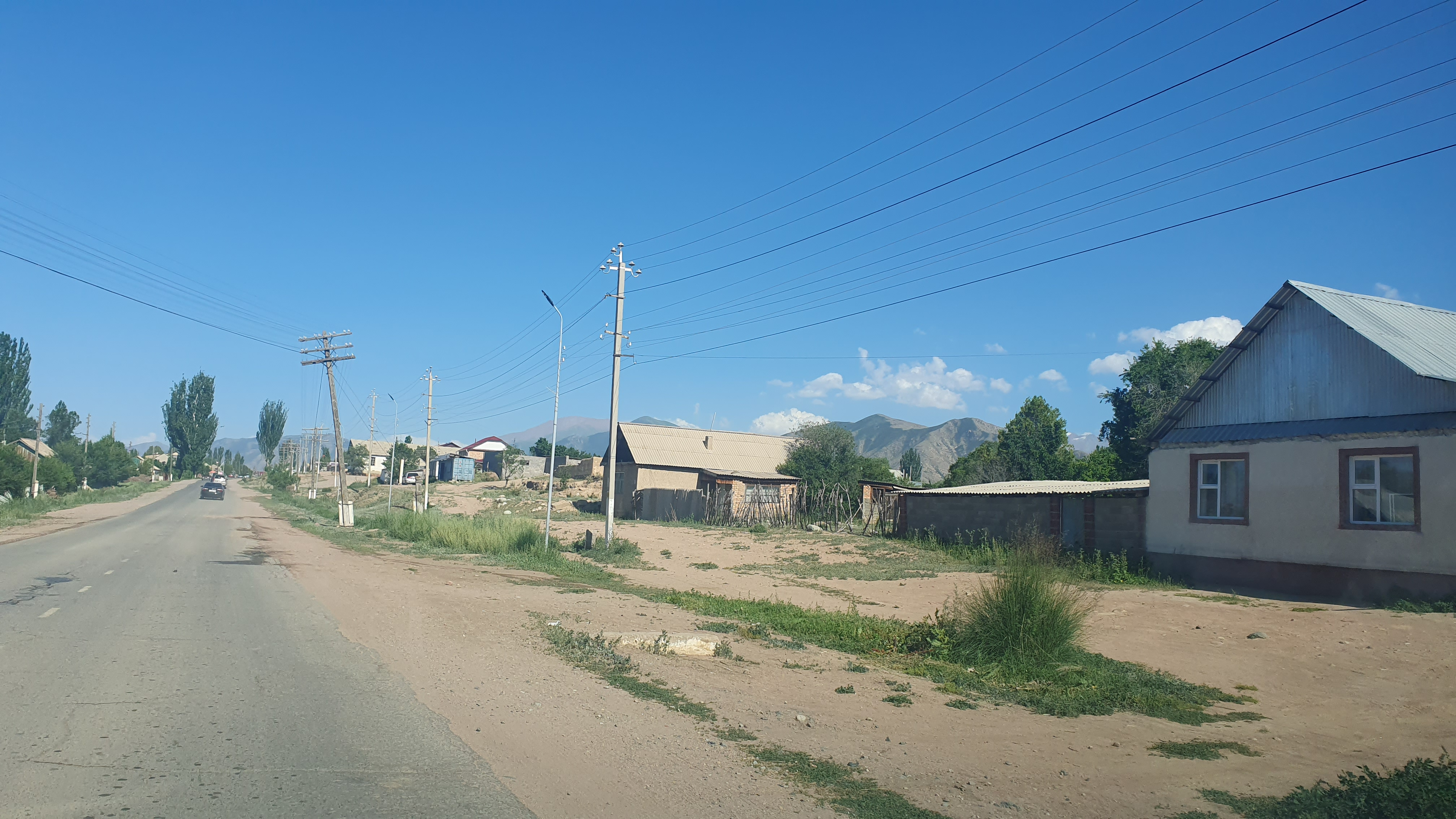
Main road of Tort-Kul village.

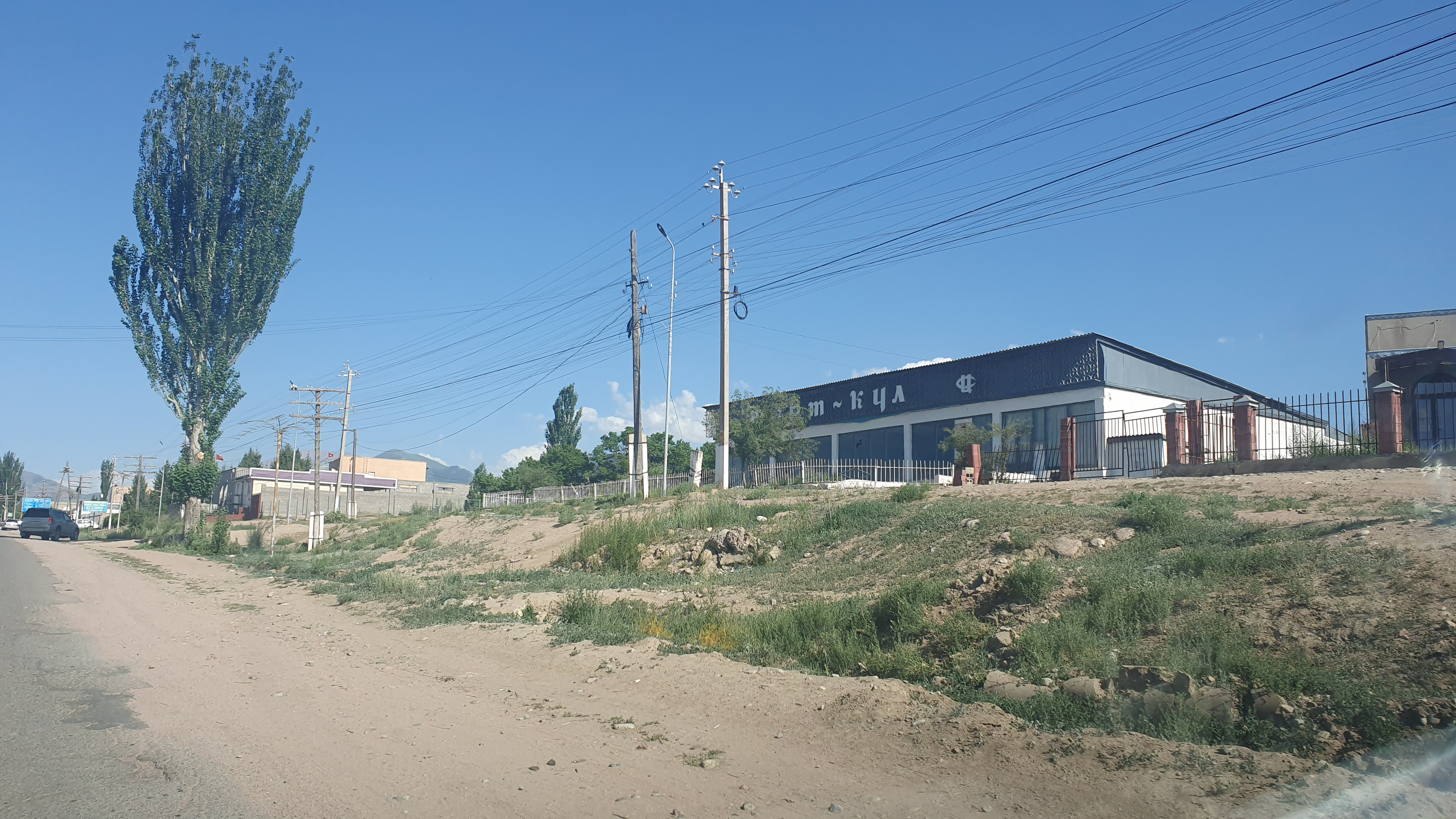
Shop in Tort-Kul village.
