= Ak-Say, Issyk-Kul =

Ak-Say Ак-Сай
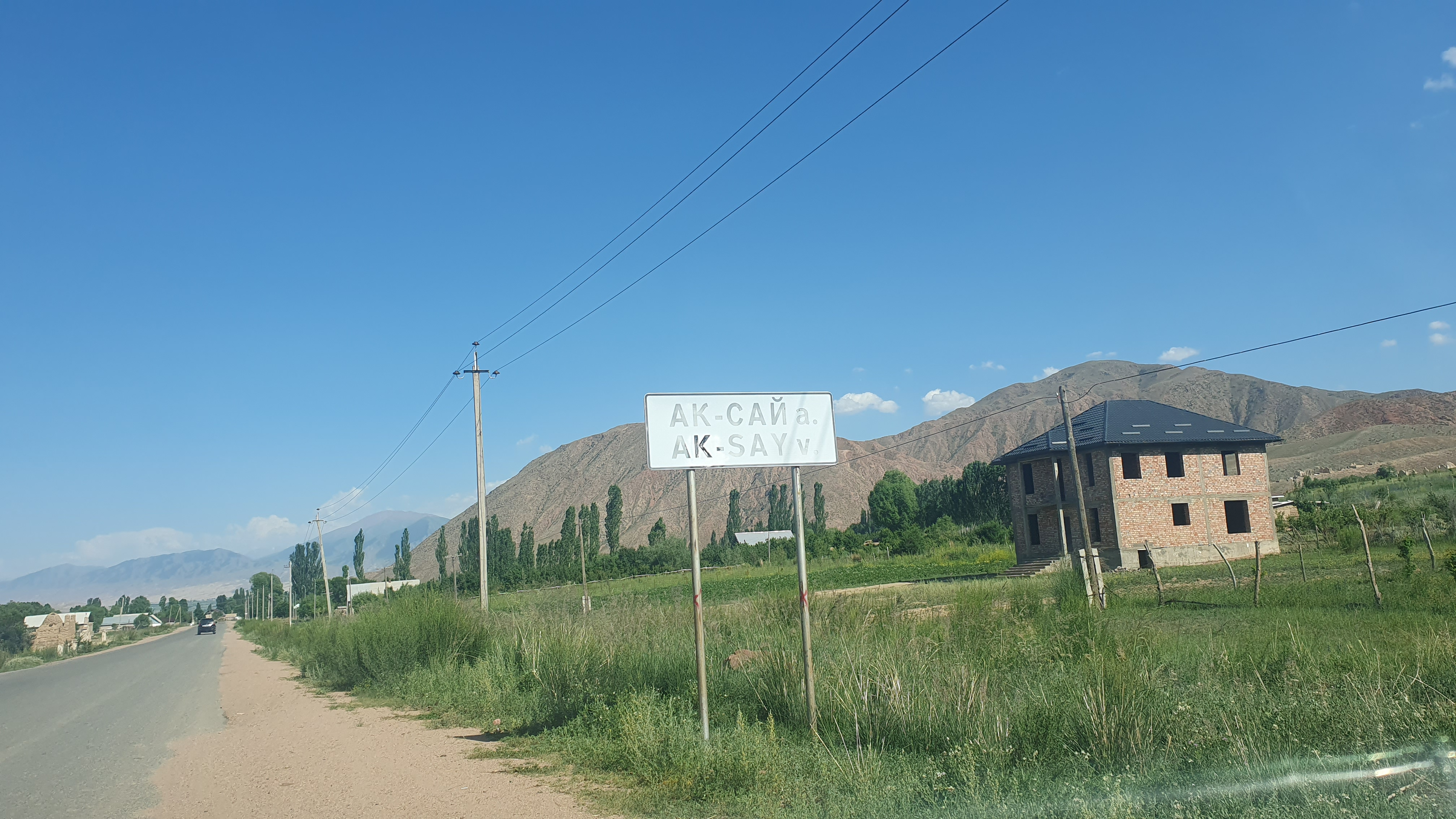

- Location within Kyrgyzstan
- Coordinates: 42°7′48″N 76°49′48″E
- Country: Kyrgyzstan
- Region: Issyk-Kul
- District: Tong
- Elevation: 1,828 m (5,997 ft)

Population (2021)
  - Total: 2,262
- Time zone: UTC+6

Ak-Say is a village in the Issyk-Kul Region of Kyrgyzstan. It is part of the Tong District. Its population was 2,262 in 2021.
