= Ala-Bash =

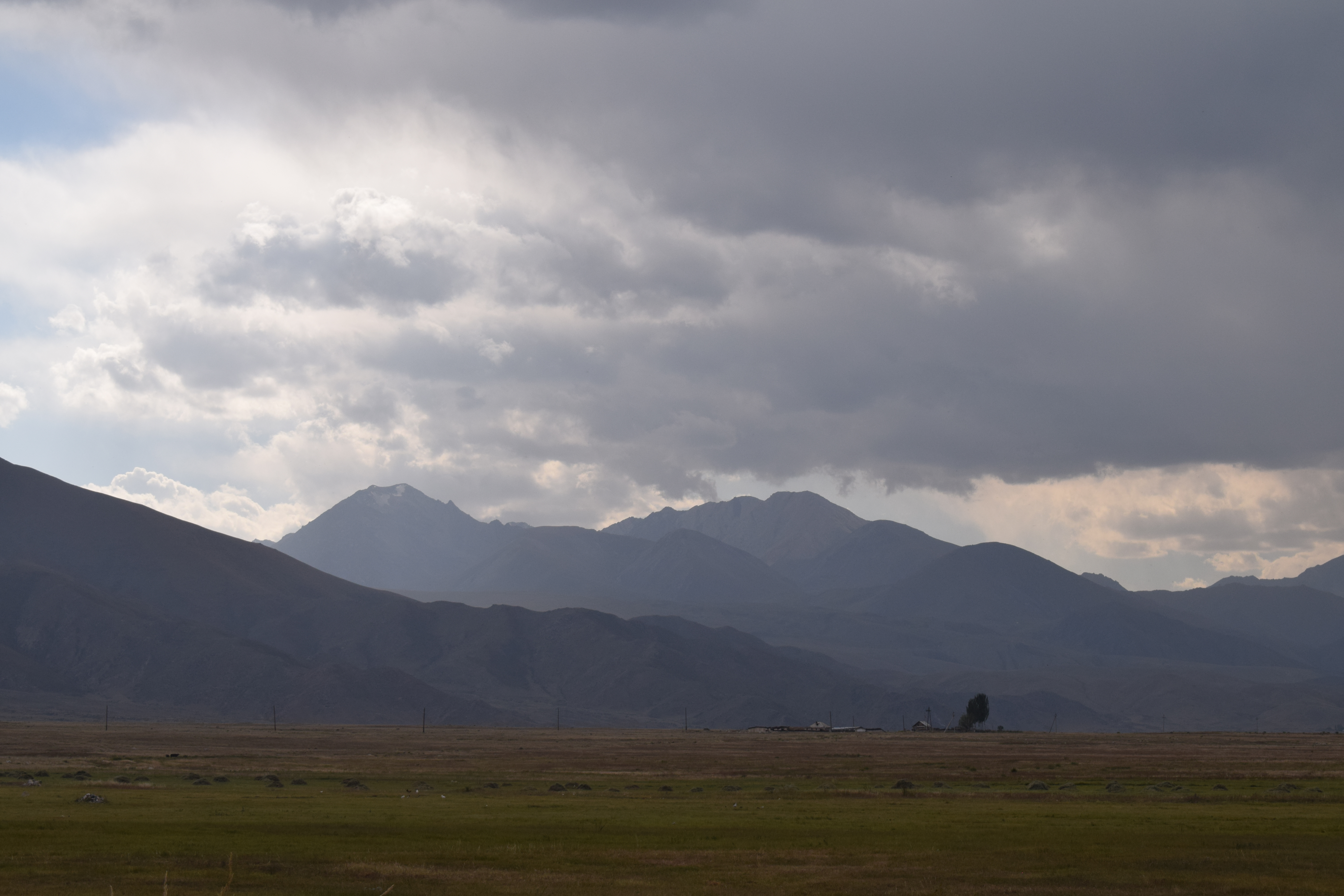

- Location within Kyrgyzstan
- Coordinates: 42°6′36″N 76°28′12″E
- Country: Kyrgyzstan
- Region: Issyk-Kul Region
- District: Tong District
- Elevation: 2,026 m (6,647 ft)

Population (2021)
  - Total: 1,663
- Time zone: UTC+6

Ala-Bash is a village in the Issyk-Kul Region of Kyrgyzstan. It is part of the Tong District. Its population was 1,663 in 2021.
