= Kök-Moynok-2 =

Kök-Moynok-2 Көк-Мойнок-2
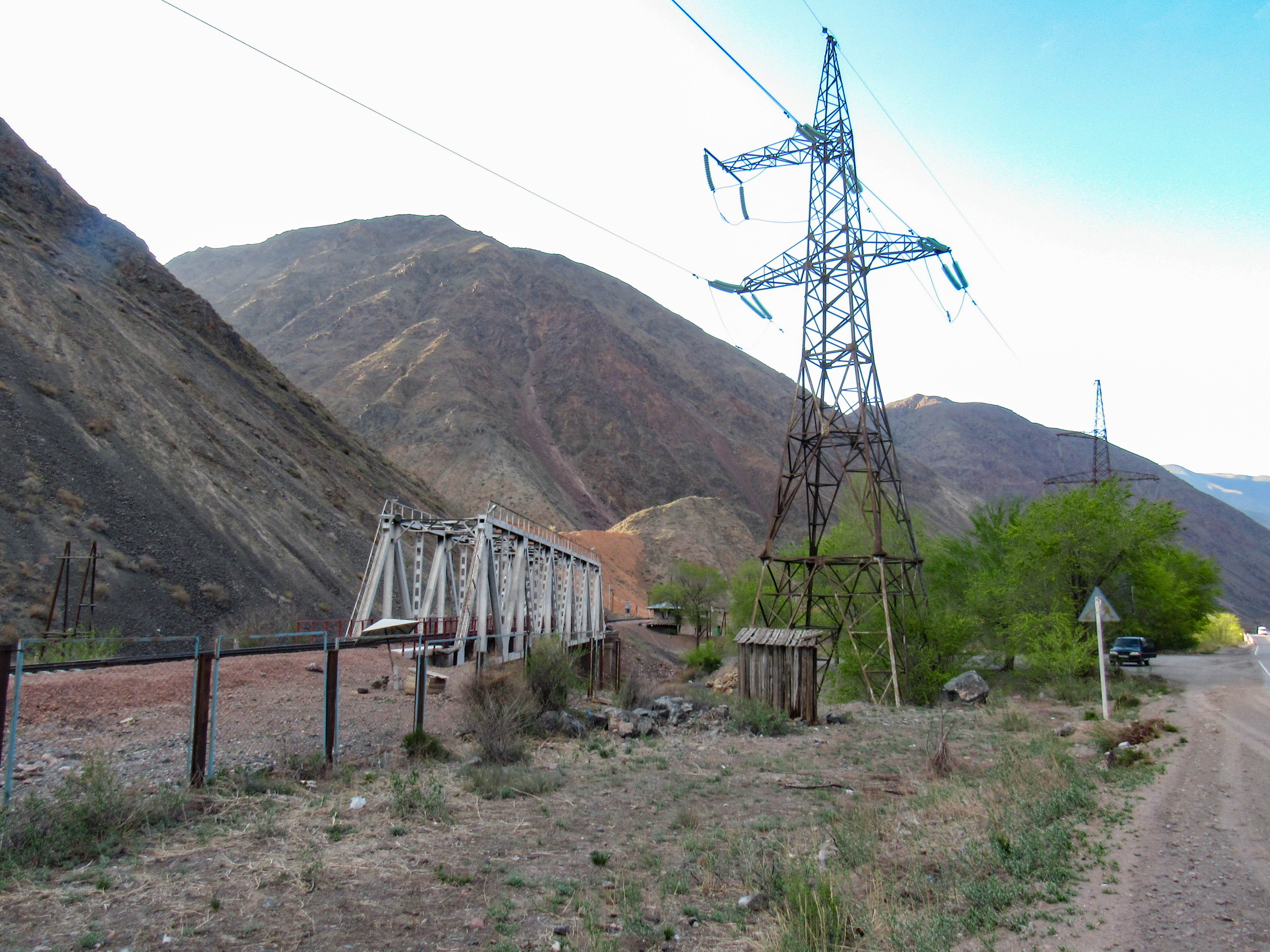

- Location within Kyrgyzstan
- Coordinates: 42°29′01″N 75°51′23″E
- Country: Kyrgyzstan
- Region: Issyk-Kul Region
- District: Tong District

Population (2021)
  - Total: 633

Kök-Moynok-2 (Kyrgyz: Көк-Мойнок-Экинчи) — is a village in the Issyk-Kul Region of Kyrgyzstan. Its population was 633 in 2021.
