= Ak-Ölöng =

Ak-Ölöng Ак-Өлөң
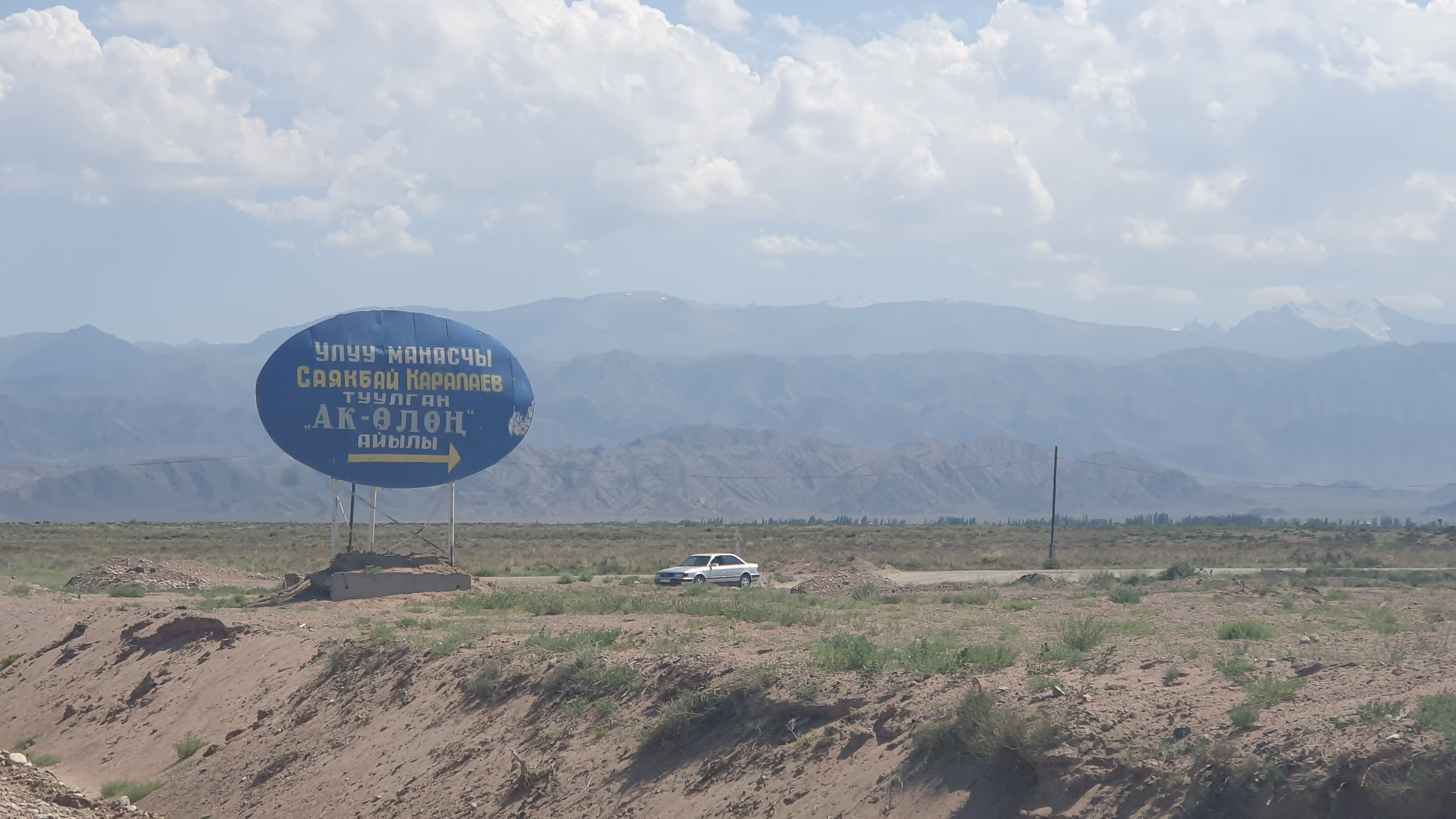

- Location within Kyrgyzstan
- Coordinates: 42°20′24″N 76°9′36″E
- Country: Kyrgyzstan
- Region: Issyk-Kul
- District: Tong
- Elevation: 1,628 m (5,341 ft)

Population (2021)
  - Total: 2,142
- Time zone: UTC+6

Ak-Ölöng (Kyrgyz: Ак-Өлөң) is a village in the Issyk-Kul Region of Kyrgyzstan. It is part of the Tong District. Its population was 2,142 in 2021. It lies about 5 kilometres (3.1 mi) inland from the western bank of Issyk Kul lake.
