= Jer-Üy =

- Location within Kyrgyzstan
- Coordinates: 42°04′20″N 76°51′20″E
- Country: Kyrgyzstan
- Region: Issyk-Kul Region
- District: Tong District
- Elevation: 2,040 m (6,690 ft)

Population (2021)
  - Total: 794
- Time zone: UTC+6

Jer-Üy (Kyrgyz: Жер-Үй, romanized Djer Üy) is a village in the Issyk-Kul Region of Kyrgyzstan. It is part of the Tong District. Its population was 794 in 2021.
