= Kara-Shaar =

Kara-Shaar Кара-Шаар
- Location within Kyrgyzstan
- Coordinates: 42°19′21″N 76°20′55″E
- Country: Kyrgyzstan
- Region: Issyk-Kul Region
- District: Tong District

Population (2021)
  - Total: 1,403
- Time zone: UTC+6

Kara-Shaar (Kyrgyz: Кара-Шаар) is a village in the Issyk-Kul Region of Kyrgyzstan. It is part of the Ulakol rural community within the Tong District. Its population was 1,403 in 2021.
