= Shor-Bulak =

Shor-Bulak Шор-Булак
- Location within Kyrgyzstan
- Coordinates: 42°15′32″N 76°33′05″E
- Country: Kyrgyzstan
- Region: Issyk-Kul Region
- District: Tong District

Population (2021)
  - Total: 1,626
- Time zone: UTC+6

Shor-Bulak (Kyrgyz: Шор-Булак) is a village in the Issyk-Kul Region of Kyrgyzstan. It is part of the Ulakol rural community within the Tong District. Its population was 1,626 in 2021.
