= Kyrgyz-Ata Botanical Reserve =

- IUCN category IV (habitat/species management area)
- Location: Nookat District, Osh Region, Kyrgyzstan
- Area: 30 ha (74 acres)
- Established: 1975

The Kyrgyz-Ata Botanical Reserve (Kyrgyz: Кыргыз-Ата ботаникалык заказниги) is located in the Nookat District of Osh Region of Kyrgyzstan. It was established in 1975 and the reserve was created to conserve a standard natural area where species such as Ixiolirion, Colchicum, Crocus, and the tulips Tulipa ferganica and Tulipa turkestanica grow. The botanical reserve occupies 30 hectares.
