= Temir-Kanat =

Temir-Kanat Темир-Канат
- Location within Kyrgyzstan
- Coordinates: 42°3′0″N 76°54′36″E
- Country: Kyrgyzstan
- Region: Issyk-Kul Region
- District: Tong District
- Elevation: 2,333 m (7,654 ft)

Population (2021)
  - Total: 1,361
- Time zone: UTC+6

Temir-Kanat (Kyrgyz: Темир-Канат, Russian: Темир-Канат) is a village in the Issyk-Kul Region of Kyrgyzstan, established in 1936. The name means 'metal wing' in Kyrgyz. The village is in the Tong District. Its population was 1,361 in 2021.
