= Chyrandy Botanical Reserve =

Protected area in Kyrgyzstan

- IUCN category IV (habitat/species management area)
- Location within Kyrgyzstan
- Location: Kadamjay District, Batken Region, Kyrgyzstan
- Coordinates: 39°53′N 71°36′E
- Area: 500 ha (1,200 acres)
- Established: 1975

The Chyrandy Botanical Reserve (Kyrgyz: Чыранды ботаникалык заказниги) is located in Kadamjay District of Batken Region of Kyrgyzstan. It was established in 1975 with a purpose of conservation of the reference area of low-land desert dry steppe zone flora and habitats of endemics such as Tulipa rosea and Tulipa ferganica. The botanical reserve occupies 500 hectares.
