= Suusamyr Botanical Reserve =

Botanical reserve in Kyrgyzstan

- IUCN category IV (habitat/species management area)
- Suusamyr Botanical Reserve

- Location within Kyrgyzstan
- Location: Jayyl District, Chüy Region, Kyrgyzstan
- Coordinates: 42°15′N 74°06′E
- Area: 2,168.5 ha (5,358 acres)
- Established: 18 December 1990

The Suusamyr Botanical Reserve is a protected area in Jayyl District, Chüy Region, Kyrgyzstan. Established on 18 December 1990, it covers 2,168.5 ha (5,358 acres) and protects riverside forests along the Suusamyr and Western Karakol rivers.

== History ==
The reserve was established by Resolution No. 366 of the Council of Ministers of the Kirghiz SSR on 18 December 1990. The resolution gave its area as 2,168.5 ha (5,358 acres) and described its location as Jumgal District, then part of Issyk-Kul Region. It was placed under the forestry association Kirgizles, on land managed by the Jumgal forestry enterprise.

The reserve is listed within the Suusamyr rural community of Jayyl District, Chüy Region, in the 2021 national classification of territorial units.

== Wildlife ==
The reserve protects tugay forests along the Suusamyr and Western Karakol rivers, including stands of willow and bird cherry. The founding resolution lists several species from the Red Data Book of the Kirghiz SSR among those the reserve was intended to protect. These include the Turkestan lynx, the forest caterpillar hunter (Calosoma sycophanta), the Old World swallowtail (Papilio machaon), Ribes janczewskii and Ammopiptanthus nanus.
