= Maymak Botanical Reserve =

Protected area in Kyrgyzstan

- Kyrgyz: Маймак ботаникалык заказниги
- IUCN category IV (habitat/species management area)
- Location: Aitmatov District, Talas Region, Kyrgyzstan
- Nearest city: Maymak
- Area: 40 ha (99 acres)
- Designation: State botanical reserve
- Established: 1980

The Maymak Botanical Reserve (Kyrgyz: Маймак ботаникалык заказниги) is a state botanical reserve in the Aitmatov District of Talas Region, Kyrgyzstan. It is located near the Maymak railway station and covers an area of 40 ha (99 acres).

The reserve was established in 1980 to protect the natural habitat where the Tulipa kaufmanniana a species listed in the Red Data Book of the Kyrgyz Republic, grows and reproduces naturally.

== See also ==
- List of protected areas of Kyrgyzstan
