= Eshperov =

Eshperov Эшперов
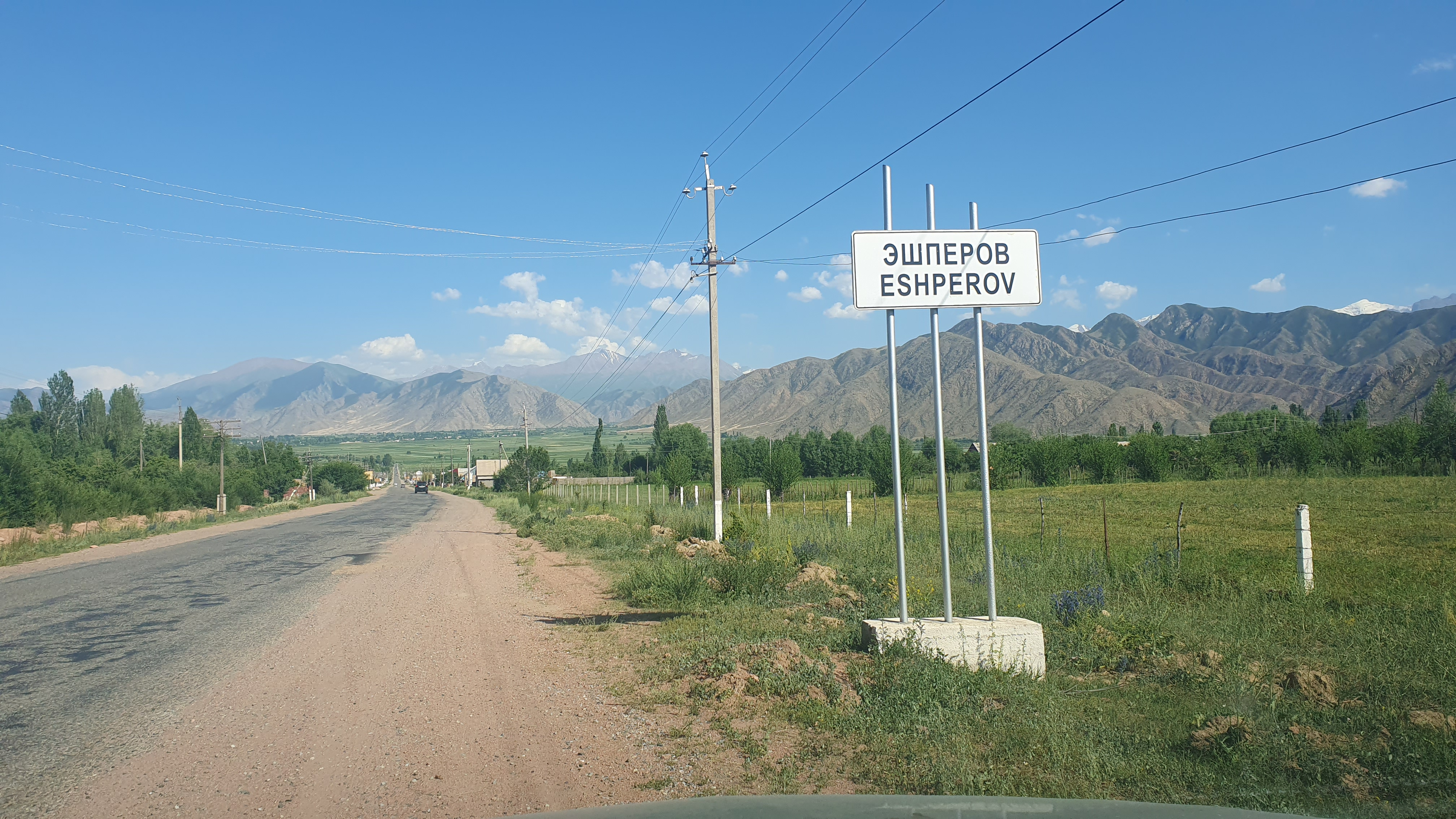

- Location within Kyrgyzstan
- Coordinates: 42°07′22″N 76°53′45″E
- Country: Kyrgyzstan
- Region: Issyk-Kul Region
- District: Tong District
- Elevation: 1,730 m (5,680 ft)

Population (2021)
  - Total: 2,535
- Time zone: UTC+6

Eshperov (Kyrgyz: Эшперов, Russian: Эшперово, known as Bol'shevik until December 2006) is a village in the Issyk-Kul Region of Kyrgyzstan. It is a center of the Bolot Mambetov rural community within the Tong District. Its population was 2,535 in 2021.
