= Kajy-Say =

Kajy-Say Кажы-Сай
- Village
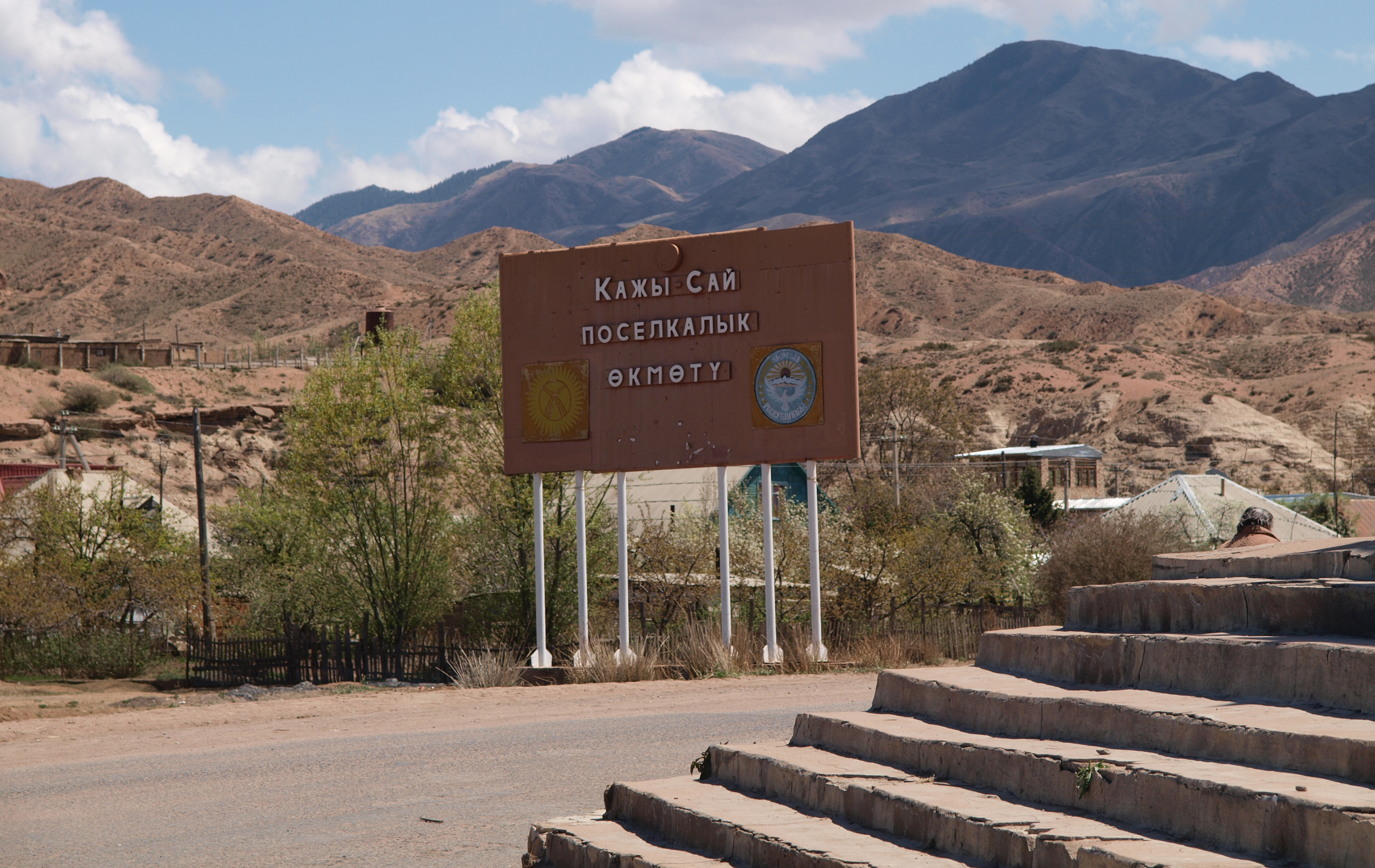
- Kadji Say

- Location within Kyrgyzstan
- Coordinates: 42°08′24″N 77°10′50″E
- Country: Kyrgyzstan
- Region: Issyk-Kul
- District: Tong
- Elevation: 1,740 m (5,710 ft)

Population (2021)
  - Total: 4,612
- Time zone: UTC+6
- Post index: 722304

Kajy-Say (Kyrgyz: Кажы-Сай) is a village in Tong District in Issyk-Kul Region of Kyrgyzstan. It was established in regard with development of Segety deposit of brown coal in 1947. Its population was 4,612 in 2021. Until 2012 it was an urban-type settlement.

== Population ==
Historical population
Year	Pop.	±% p.a.
1970	7,600	—
1979	6,995	−0.92%
1989	8,232	+1.64%
1999	4,436	−6.00%
2009	4,222	−0.49%
2021	4,612	+0.74%
Note: resident population; Sources:
