= Kajy-Saz =

Kaji-Saz Кажы-Саз
- Location within Kyrgyzstan
- Coordinates: 42°04′58″N 77°14′16″E
- Country: Kyrgyzstan
- Region: Issyk-Kul Region
- District: Tong District
- Elevation: 2,434 m (7,986 ft)

Population (2021)
  - Total: 567
- Time zone: UTC+6

Kaji-Saz (Kyrgyz: Кажы-Саз) is a village in the Issyk-Kul Region of Kyrgyzstan. It is part of the Tong rural community within the Tong District. Its population was 567 in 2021.
