= Bar-Bulak =

Bar-Bulak Бар-Булак
- Location within Kyrgyzstan
- Coordinates: 42°14′42″N 76°34′50″E
- Country: Kyrgyzstan
- Region: Issyk-Kul Region
- District: Tong District

Population (2021)
  - Total: 948
- Time zone: UTC+6

Bar-Bulak is a village in the Issyk-Kul Region of Kyrgyzstan. It is part of the Tong District. Its population was 948 in 2021.

== Population ==
Historical population
Year	Pop.	±% p.a.
2009	655	—
2021	948	+3.13%
Note: resident population; Sources:
