= Toguz-Bulak, Tong =

Toguz-Bulak Тогуз-Булак
- Flag

- Location within Kyrgyzstan
- Coordinates: 42°5′22″N 76°44′37″E
- Country: Kyrgyzstan
- Region: Issyk-Kul
- District: Tong

Population (2021)
  - Total: 2,372
- Time zone: UTC+6

Toguz-Bulak is a village in the Issyk-Kul Region of Kyrgyzstan. It is part of the Tong District. Its population was 2,372 in 2021.
