= Talas Integrated Reserve =

Protected area in Kyrgyzstan

- IUCN category IV (habitat/species management area)
- Location within Kyrgyzstan
- Location: Talas Region, Kyrgyzstan
- Nearest city: Talas
- Coordinates: 42°18′N 71°46′E
- Area: 1,300 km^{2} (500 sq mi)
- Established: 1973

Talas Integrated Reserve (Kyrgyz: Талас комплекстүү заказниги) is a nature and game reserve located in Bakay-Ata District and Talas District of Talas Region of Kyrgyzstan. It lies on the north slopes of the Talas Alatoo mountain range, and covers the basins of the rivers Karabuura, Kümüshtak and Ürmaral (all left tributaries of the river Talas). Established in 1973, it covers 130 thousand hectares.
