= Kara-Talaa =

Kara-Talaa Кара-Талаа
- Location within Kyrgyzstan
- Coordinates: 42°19′00″N 76°24′10″E
- Country: Kyrgyzstan
- Region: Issyk-Kul Region
- District: Tong District

Population (2021)
  - Total: 3,153
- Time zone: UTC+6

Kara-Talaa (Kyrgyz: Кара-Талаа) is a village in the Issyk-Kul Region of Kyrgyzstan. It is part of the Ulakol rural community within the Tong District. Its population was 3,153 in 2021.
