= Ak-Buura Game Reserve =

- IUCN category IV (habitat/species management area)
- Location within Kyrgyzstan
- Location: Kyrgyzstan
- Coordinates: 40°19′N 72°58′E
- Area: 10,000 ha (25,000 acres)
- Established: 1975

Ak-Buura Game Reserve is a protected area in Kara-Suu District, Osh Region, Kyrgyzstan. It was established in 1975 with a purpose of conserving breeding areas of pheasant, see-see partridge, and chukar. The reserve covers 10,000 hectares in the Ak-Buura river valley.
