= Teploklyuchenka Game Reserve =

Protected area in Kyrgyzstan

- IUCN category IV (habitat/species management area)
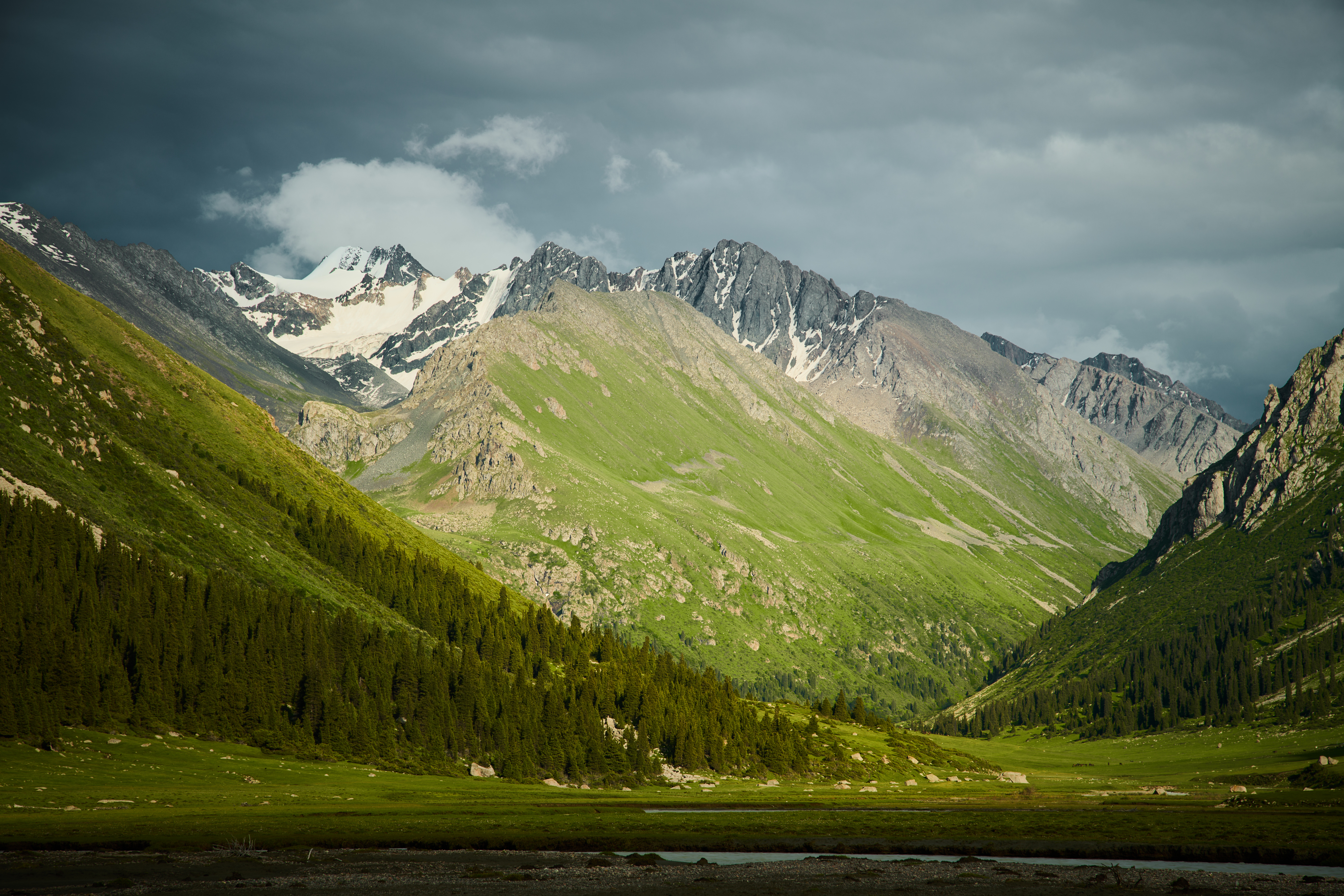
- Teploklyuchenka Game Reserve - Ak-Suu Valley

- Location within Kyrgyzstan
- Location: Kyrgyzstan
- Nearest city: Karakol
- Coordinates: 42°24′N 78°36′E
- Area: 32,200 ha (80,000 acres)
- Established: 1958

Teploklyuchenka Game Reserve (Kyrgyz: Теплоключенка зоологиялык (аң уулоочу) заказниги) is a protected area in Ak-Suu District, Issyk-Kul Region of Kyrgyzstan.

It is located in the Arashan river basin on the northern slope of Teskey Ala-Too, about 15 km southeast of Karakul The reserve was established in 1958 to protect game fauna and conserve natural mountain forest and high-mountain ecosystems. It covers 32,200 hectares.

== Fauna ==
The spruce forests of the reserve support a diverse range of mammals. Species recorded in the encyclopedia include brown bear, wolf, fox, badger, lynx, wild boar, roe deer, red deer, Tien Shan marmot, and numerous small mammals. The common squirrel was introduced to the area in 1952.

The reserve also supports a variety of forest birds, including woodpeckers, tits, crossbills, crows, owls, hawks and falcons, as well as amphibians and reptiles.

The higher mountain areas are inhabited by species including the snow leopard, Siberian ibex, Tien Shan marmot, and several species of high-mountain birds.

== Protected species ==
According to the 1994 encyclopedia, species occurring in the reserve that were included in the Red Data Book of the Kyrgyz Republic included the brown bear, snow leopard, lynx, Pallas’s cat and red deer, together with several rare birds of prey and other bird species.

== Management ==
Limited economic activities have traditionally been permitted within the reserve, including sanitary tree cutting, mushroom and berry collection, and livestock grazing in non-forested areas. An area with particularly well-developed mountain currant vegetation is also included within the reserve.

Forest planting was carried out by the Teploklyuchenka Experimental Forestry Enterprise. Wildlife management measures included the provision of salt and supplementary feed. The reserve also had a museum.
