= Kan-i-Gut =

- IUCN category III (natural monument or feature)
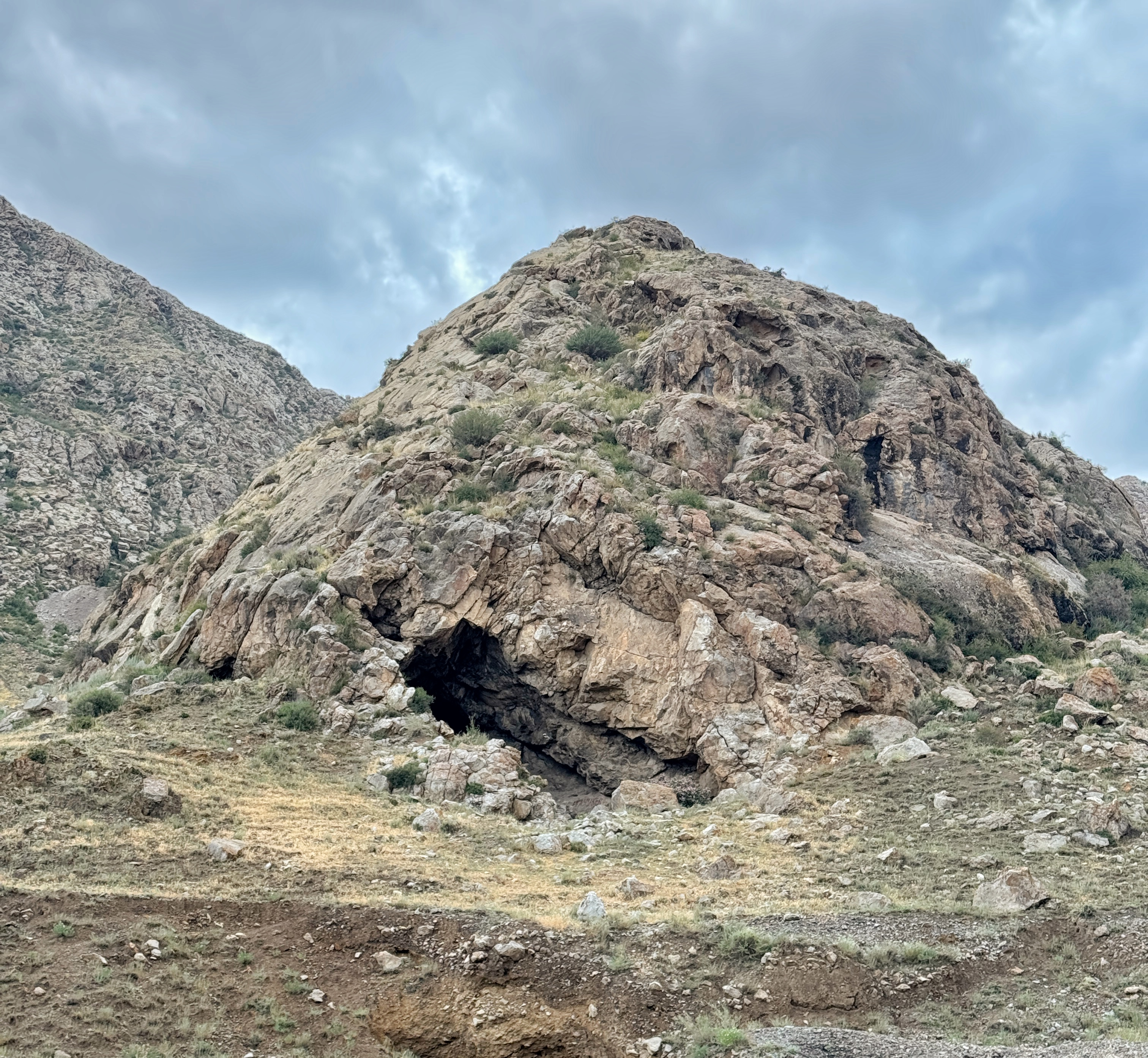

- Location within Kyrgyzstan
- Location: Batken District, Batken Region, Kyrgyzstan
- Coordinates: 40°00.764′N 70°20.782′E
- Established: 1975

Kan-i-Gut (or Kanigut or Kani-Gut, "mine-of-loss", Kyrgyz: Канигут үңкүрү) cave is a geological protected area (nature monument) located at north slopes of Turkestan Range in Batken District, Batken Region, Kyrgyzstan. The cave consists of 18 large caverns, deep cavities, narrow passageways and tunnels. It is 6,000 metres (20,000 ft) long and 100 metres (330 ft) deep. From the 6th to the 11th century the cave served as a lead and iron mine. Silver and other metals and minerals were also mined here at the time. The first miners in the cave were Arabs, so the Chinese continued, and much later during World War II, Soviet political prisoners mined here.

A scientific study on the elemental composition of loose sediments in a cave mine was performed in due time, by the method of X - ray fluorescence analysis with the use of synchrotron radiation.
