= Aydarken Botanical Reserve =

Protected area in Kyrgyzstan

- IUCN category IV (habitat/species management area)
- Location: Kyrgyzstan
- Area: 30 ha (74 acres)
- Established: 1975

Aydarken Botanical Reserve (Kyrgyz: Айдаркен ботаникалык заказниги, also Хайдаркен Khaydarken) is a reserve located in Kadamjay District of Batken Region in Kyrgyzstan. It was established in 1975 to protect endemics tulips (Tulipa rosea Vved.). The reserve occupies 30 hectares.
