= Jazy Game Reserve =

- IUCN category IV (habitat/species management area)
- Location within Kyrgyzstan
- Location: Kyrgyzstan
- Nearest city: Özgön
- Coordinates: 40°46′N 73°26′E
- Area: 5,000 ha (12,000 acres)
- Established: 1975

Jazy Game Reserve (Kyrgyz: Жазы зоологиялык (аң уулоочу) заказниги, also Ясин Yasin) is a protected area in Özgön District, Osh Region, Kyrgyzstan. It is located in the flood plain of the lower reach of the river Jazy, near the city Özgön. It was established in 1975 to conserve flood plain reed-sandthorn brushwoods and wetlands, serving breeding areas for pheasant, and wintering ground for water-fowl birds. The reserve occupies 5,000 hectares.
