= Iyri-Suu Forest Reserve =

- IUCN category IV (habitat/species management area)
- Location: Naryn District, Naryn Region, Kyrgyzstan
- Nearest city: Naryn
- Area: 3.95 km^{2} (1.53 sq mi)
- Established: 1975

The Iyri-Suu Forest Reserve (Kyrgyz: Ийри-Суу заказниги)) is located in the Ortok rural community, Naryn District, Naryn Region, Kyrgyzstan. It was established in 1975 with a purpose of conservation of natural Schrenk's Spruce (Picea schrenkiana) forest. The forest reserve occupies 395 hectares.
