= Abshir-Ata Waterfall =

- Абшыр-Ата
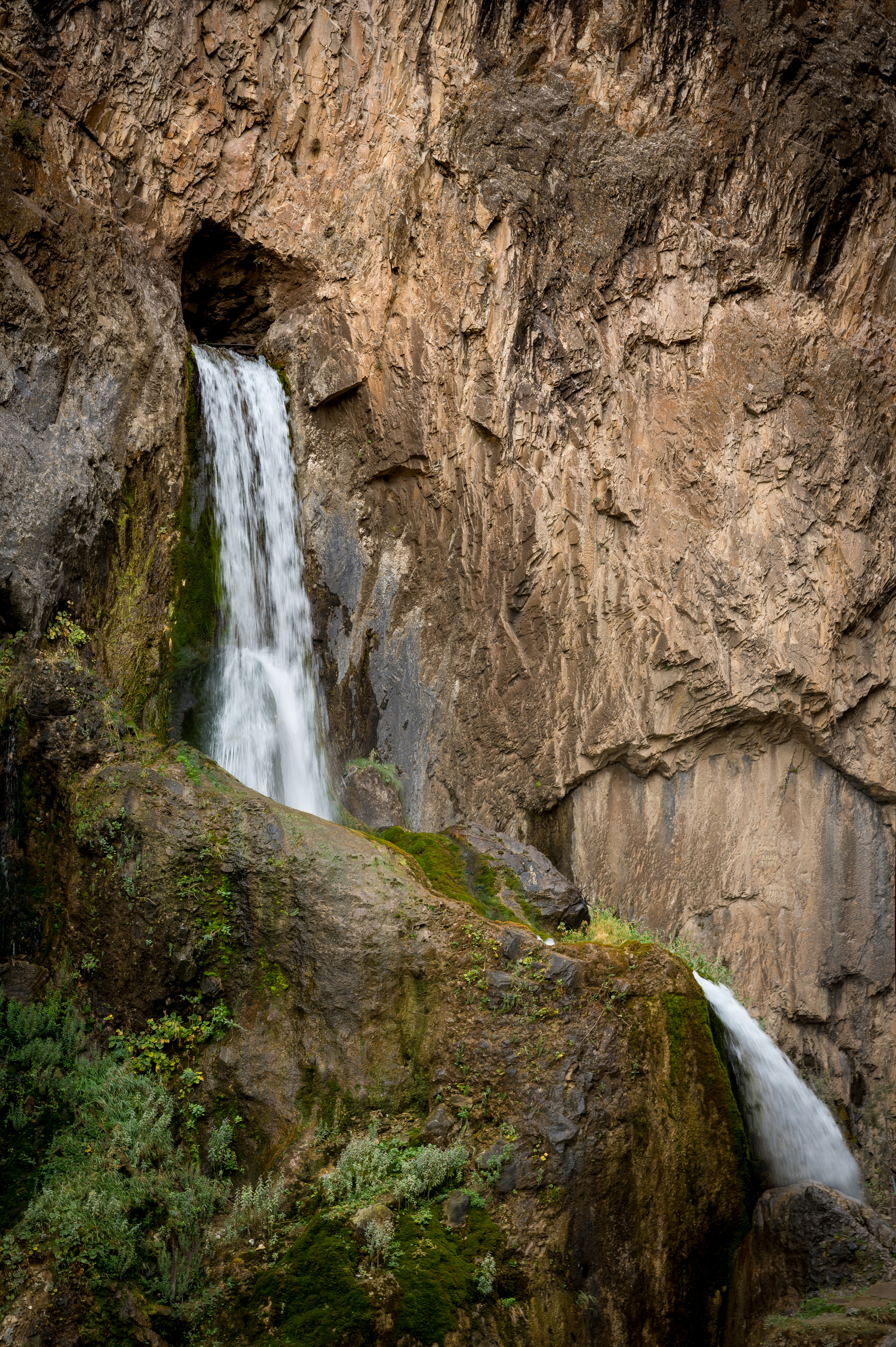

- Location within Kyrgyzstan
- Location: Kyrgyzstan
- Nearest city: Kyzyl-Kiya, Nookat
- Coordinates: 40°09′46″N 72°21′47″E
- Established: 1975

Abshir-Ata Waterfall (Kyrgyz: Абшир-Ата шаркыратмасы) is a geological reserve in Nookat District of Osh Region of Kyrgyzstan. It was established in 1975. The waterfall is the mouth of an underground river in the valley of the river Abshirsay. The water cascades down in two steps (15 m and 12 m) through 1.5 m cave in a sheer cliff.
