= Sary-Mogol Botanical Reserve =

- IUCN category IV (habitat/species management area)
- Location within Kyrgyzstan
- Location: Alay District, Osh Region, Kyrgyzstan
- Coordinates: 39°44′N 72°53′E
- Area: 60 ha (150 acres)
- Established: 1975

The Sary-Mogol Botanical Reserve (Kyrgyz: Сары-Могол ботаникалык заказниги) is located in Alay District of Osh Region of Kyrgyzstan. It was established in 1975 with a purpose of conservation of endemic Pulsatílla kostyczewii. The botanical reserve is situated at 3 km from the village Sary-Mogol and occupies 60 hectares.
