= Kulun-Ata Nature Reserve =

Nature reserve in Kyrgyzstan

Kulunata State Nature Reserve
- Kulunata State Nature Reserve
- Location: Osh Region, Kyrgyzstan
- Nearest city: Osh
- Coordinates: Kulunata: 40.54277°N 74.36131°E; Tonzoo: 40.47620°N 73.97060°E
- Area: 27,434.2 ha (67,791 acres)
- Established: 11 August 2004
- Kulunata and Tonzoo sections

Kulun-Ata State Nature Reserve (Kyrgyz: Кулун-Ата мамлекеттик коругу, Russian: Кулунатинский государственный природный заповедник) is a nature reserve in Kara-Kulja District of Osh Region, Kyrgyzstan. It was established on 11 August 2004 to conserve biodiversity, juniper and conifer forests, and mountain and lake ecosystems. The national protected-area database reports an area of 27,434.2 ha (67,791 acres), comprising two geographically separate sections, Kulunata and Tonzoo.

== History and conservation ==
The reserve was established by Government Resolution No. 598 of 11 August 2004. Its stated purposes were to conserve biodiversity and the genetic diversity of juniper and conifer forests, strengthen the protection of biological resources, and expand Kyrgyzstan's network of protected areas. The resolution designated 24,510 ha (60,600 acres), comprising the Kulunata section of 18,510 ha (45,700 acres) and the Tonzoo section of 6,000 ha (15,000 acres).

The national protected-area database gives a forest-inventory area of 27,434.2 ha (67,791 acres), divided between Kulunata (21,433.5 ha (52,963 acres)) and Tonzoo (6,000.7 ha (14,828 acres)). The reserve's functions include habitat protection, scientific research, monitoring natural processes and environmental education.

== Geography ==
The reserve lies between the Fergana and Alay ranges, in the upper basin of the Tar River, approximately 175 km (109 mi) from Osh. Its habitats include spruce and juniper forests and subalpine meadows.

The principal rivers of its two sections are the Kulunata and Tonzoo. The Kulun river flows westwards and is fed mainly by seasonal snowmelt, with rainfall and groundwater providing additional contributions.

Kulun Lake lies at an elevation of 2,856 m (9,370 ft) and covers 306.3 ha (3.063 km^{2}). The smaller Lake Ortoköl, to its west, lies at 2,453 m (8,048 ft) and covers 26.9 ha (0.269 km^{2}). According to the national protected-area database, both lakes formed when earthquake-induced rockfalls dammed the river.

== Climate ==
The climate is continental, with substantial local variation caused by elevation and topography. The Kyzyl-Jar meteorological station, approximately 25 km (16 mi) from the reserve at an elevation of 2,200 m (7,200 ft), records mean temperatures of −15.4 °C (4.3 °F) in January and 15 °C (59 °F) in July.

== Flora and fauna ==
A review of the reserve's flora reported that an expedition in August 2008, conducted mainly in the Kulunata section, recorded 394 species of higher plants. The checklist was considered preliminary: the late timing of the survey limited the recording of spring-flowering plants, including species of Tulipa, Crocus and Gagea. Further surveys in spring and early summer were recommended.

The review reported 16 plant species endemic to Kyrgyzstan and approximately 62 restricted to Central Asia. Species-rich families included Asteraceae, Poaceae, Apiaceae, Fabaceae, Rosaceae and Lamiaceae. Persian rowan (Sorbus persica), listed in the Red Data Book of Kyrgyzstan, was recorded during the survey.

The national protected-area database lists plants including Alajja anomala and Sievers's apple (Malus sieversii). It also reports 63 mammal species, 81 bird species and six reptile species.

Mammals recorded include the brown bear (Ursus arctos), argali (Ovis ammon), Indian crested porcupine (Hystrix indica), snow leopard (Panthera uncia) and stone marten (Martes foina).

== Gallery ==
River valley in the reserve

Forested mountain slopes

Wildflowers in the reserve

Yellow-flowered plants
