= Kochkor Game Reserve =

- IUCN category IV (habitat/species management area)
- Location within Kyrgyzstan
- Location: Kochkor District, Naryn Region, Kyrgyzstan
- Coordinates: 42°12′N 75°36′E
- Area: 2,000 ha (4,900 acres)
- Established: 1977

The Kochkor Game Reserve is located in Kochkor District of Naryn Region of Kyrgyzstan. It was established in 1977 with a purpose of reproduction of pheasant, tolai hare, and other game animals. The game reserve occupies 2,000 hectares (4,900 acres).
