= Kongur-Ölöng =

Kongur-Ölöng Коңур-Өлөң
- Location within Kyrgyzstan
- Coordinates: 42°6′0″N 76°36′36″E
- Country: Kyrgyzstan
- Region: Issyk-Kul Region
- District: Tong District
- Elevation: 2,000 m (6,600 ft)

Population (2021)
  - Total: 1,957
- Time zone: UTC+6

Kongur-Ölöng is a village in the Issyk-Kul Region of Kyrgyzstan. It is part of the Tong District. Its population was 1,957 in 2021.
