= Aygül-Tash =

Botanical reserve in Kyrgyzstan

- IUCN category IV (habitat/species management area)
- Location within Kyrgyzstan
- Location: Batken District, Batken Region, Kyrgyzstan
- Coordinates: 39.9591°N 70.9634°E
- Established: 2009

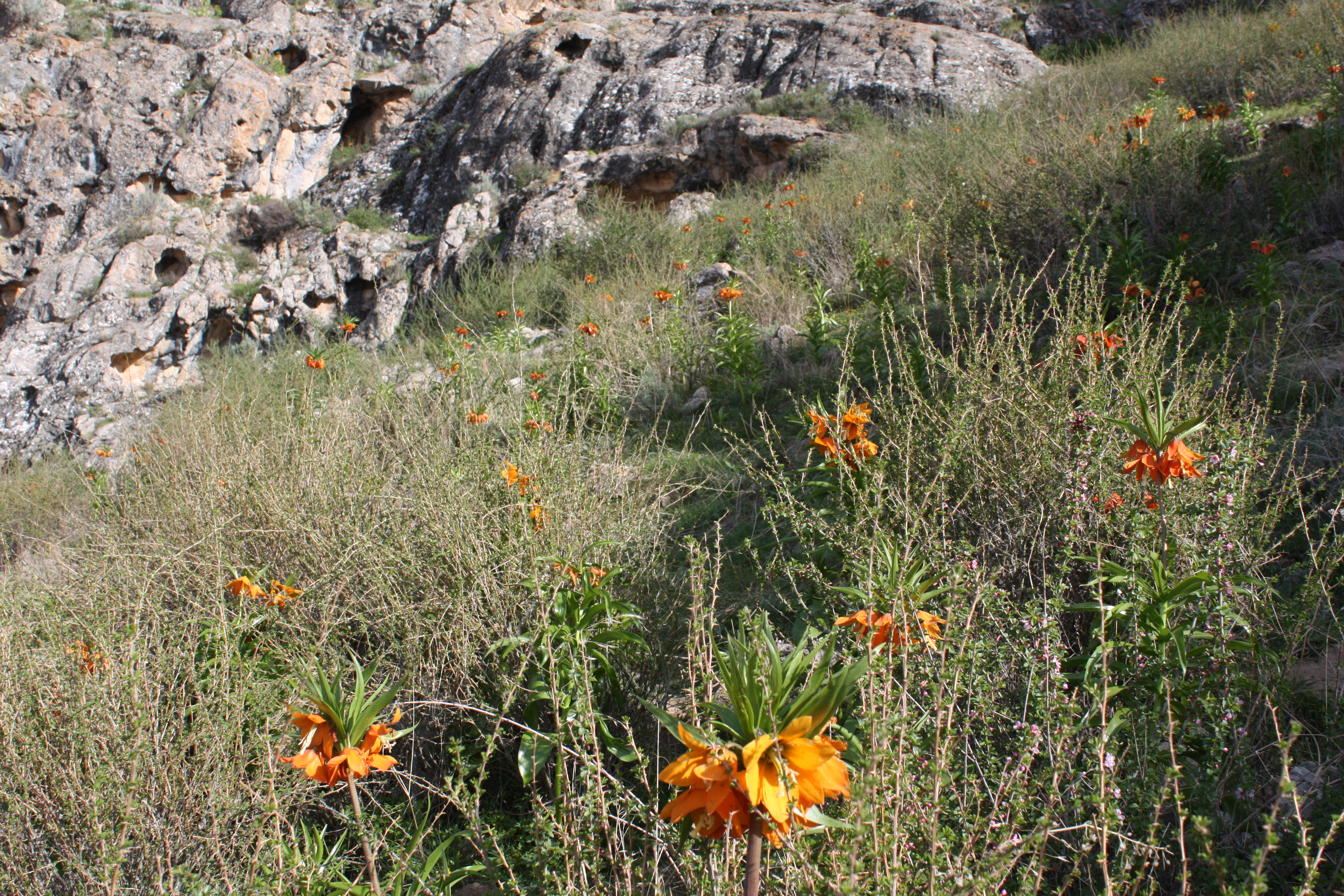
Mount Aygül-Tash: Batken Oblast, Batkensky District.

Aygül-Tash (Kyrgyz: Айгүл-Таш тоосу, Russian: Гора Айгуль-Таш) is a botanical reserve in Batken District of Batken Region of Kyrgyzstan. It was established in 2009 with a purpose of conservation of unique nature complexes and biodiversity of Kyrgyzstan.

Kyrgyzstan's State Commission for Environmental Protection and Forestry plans to give the area a special level of protection, with the aim of preserving the endemic Aigul flower.
