= Kongur wetland =

Freshwater wetland in Tamil Nadu, India

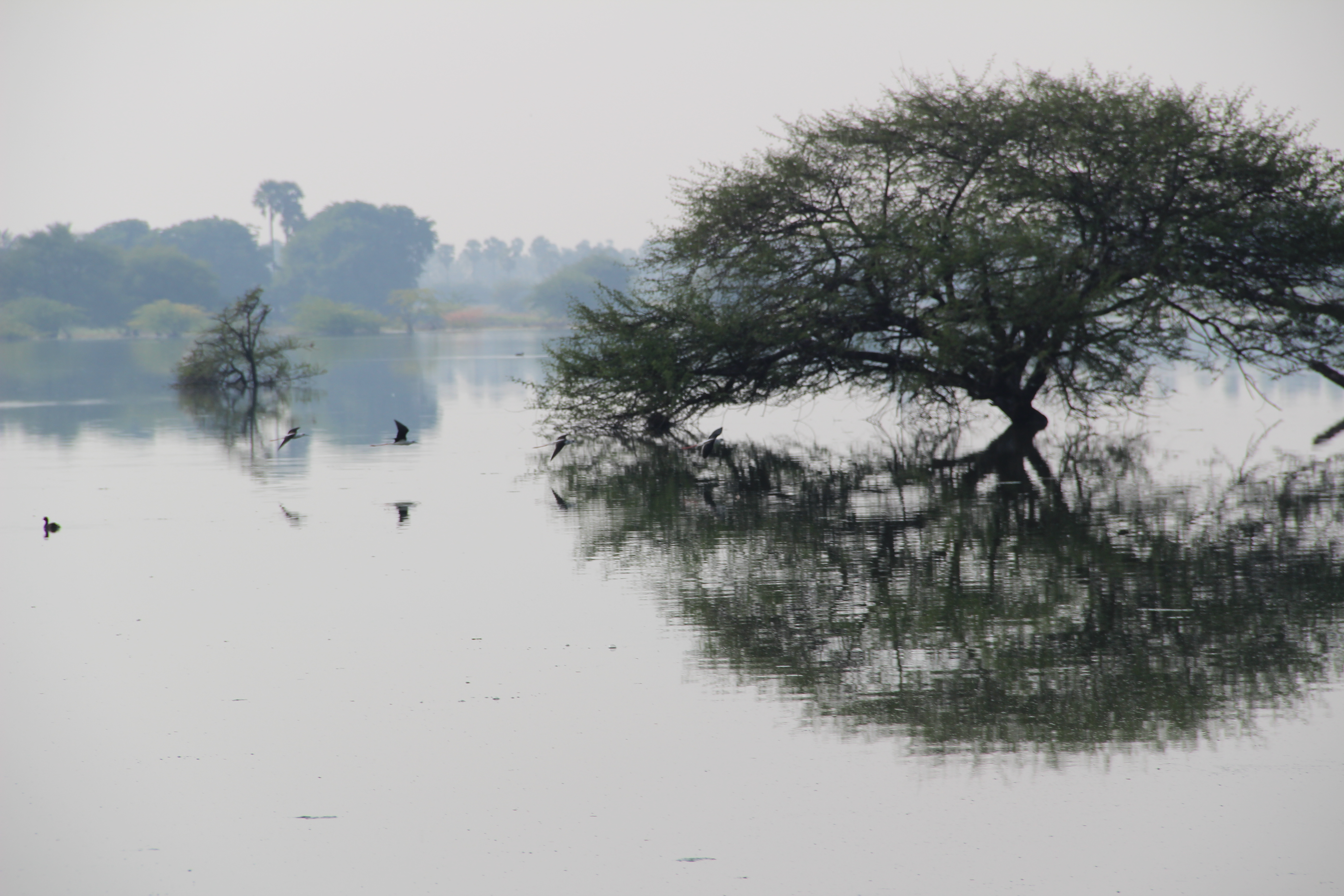
Kongur Wetland

Kongur is a freshwater wetland located in Tirupur District, Tamil Nadu, India. On the road to Palani, a pilgrim town, there is a lake, spread over 260 acres, which attracts a lot of birds, including many migratory species.

Some of the birds which can be seen here are painted stork, Oriental ibis, common sandpiper, Indian spot-billed duck, common coot, rosy starling, little cormorant, cattle egret, intermediate egret, little egret, southern coucal, rose-ringed parakeet, white-breasted kingfisher, pied kingfisher, darter, little grebe, spotted owlet, Indian roller, ashy prinia, common hoopoe, common moorhen, common myna, pied wagtail, grey wagtail, pied bushchat, Asian green bee-eater, black-winged kite, Asian koel, pond heron, black drongo, pied cuckoo, blue-faced malkoha, Indian robin, purple sunbird, purple-rumped sunbird, white-headed babbler, common flameback, open-bill stork, greater egret, grey heron, Eurasian collared dove, glossy ibis, rock pigeon, white-breasted waterhen, Indian paradise flycatcher, paddy-field pipit, Indian silverbill, northern shoveller.

In 2012 two greater flamingos arrived here as winter visitors.

A huge number of babool trees attract birds for roosting. The lake receives the water from Shanmuga Nadhi which is originated from Palani Hills. The lake is 25 km from Palani.

Some of the resident birds such as peafowls, grey francolins can also be seen here.

Destruction of babool and palm trees are threatening the birds' habitat.
