= Kök-Moynok-1 =

Kök-Moynok-1 Көк-Мойнок-1
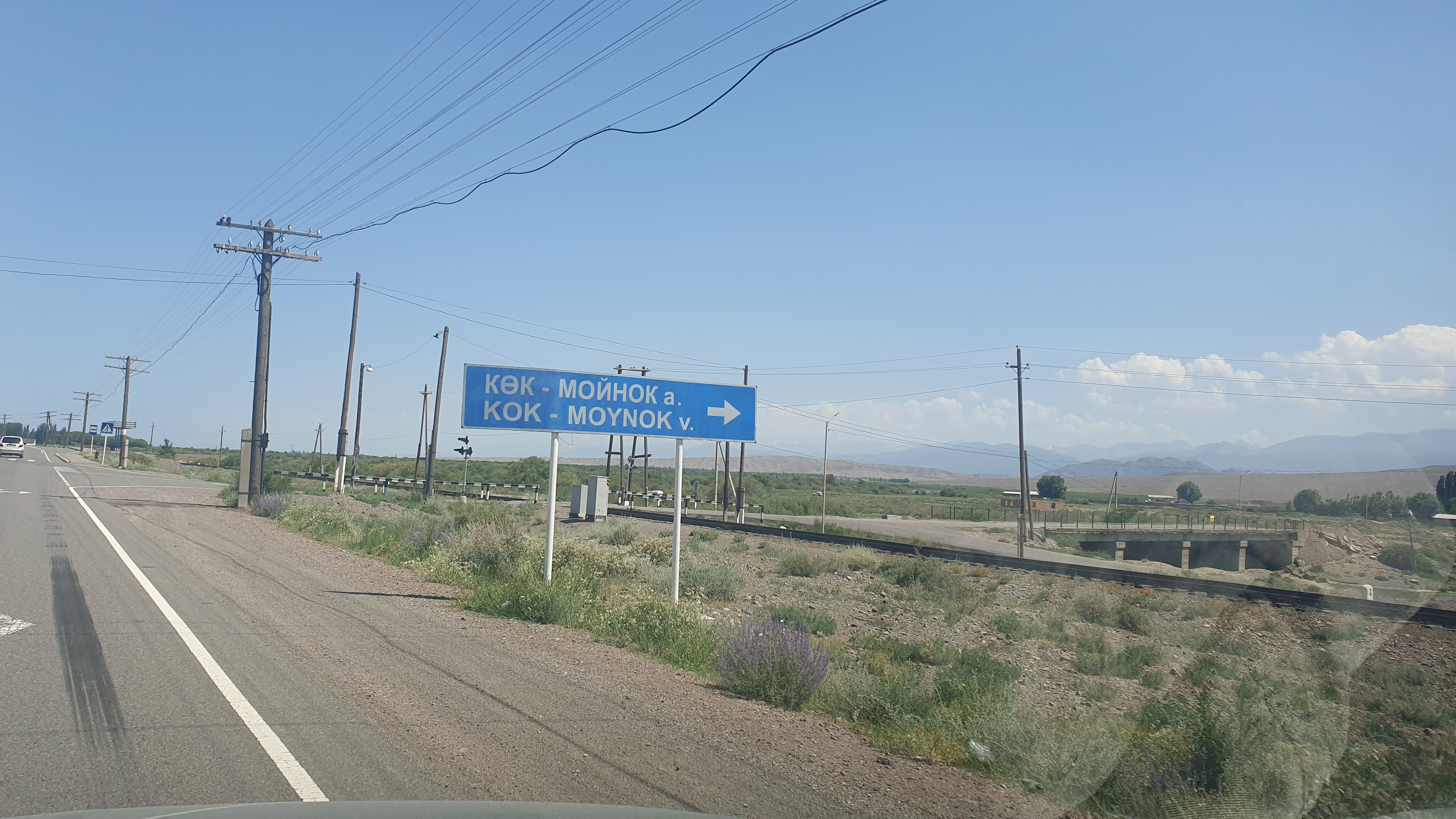

- Location within Kyrgyzstan
- Coordinates: 42°27′28″N 76°03′02″E
- Country: Kyrgyzstan
- Region: Issyk-Kul Region
- District: Tong District
- Elevation: 1,538 m (5,046 ft)

Population (2021)
  - Total: 1,015

Kök-Moynok-1 (Kyrgyz: Көк-Мойнок-Биринчи) — is a village in the Issyk-Kul Region of Kyrgyzstan. Its population was 1,015 in 2021.
