= Sülüktü Botanical Reserve =

Botanical reserve

- IUCN category IV (habitat/species management area)
- Location: Kyrgyzstan
- Nearest city: Sülüktü
- Area: 30 ha (74 acres)
- Established: 1975

Sülüktü Botanical Reserve (Kyrgyz: Сүлүктү ботаникалык заказниги) is a reserve located in Leylek District of Batken Region of Kyrgyzstan. It was established in 1975 to protect endemics tulips (Tulipa rosea Vved. and Tulipa kolpakowskiana Regel). The reserve occupies 30 hectares.
