= Tüp Botanical Reserve =

Sanctuary in Tup District, Issyk-Kul Region, Kyrgyzstan

- IUCN category IV (habitat/species management area)
- Interactive map of Tüp Botanical Reserve
- Location: Tüp District, Issyk-Kul Region, Kyrgyzstan
- Area: 100 ha (250 acres)
- Established: 1975

The Tüp Botanical Reserve (Kyrgyz: Түп ботаникалык заказниги) is located in Tüp District, Issyk-Kul Region, Kyrgyzstan. It was established in 1975 with a purpose of conservation of Savin Juniper (Juniperus sabina). The botanical reserve occupies 100 hectares. Among other flora species inhabiting the reserve are willow, barberry, Caragana, etc.
