= Gülchö Game Reserve =

Protected area in Osh, Kyrgyzstan

- IUCN category IV (habitat/species management area)
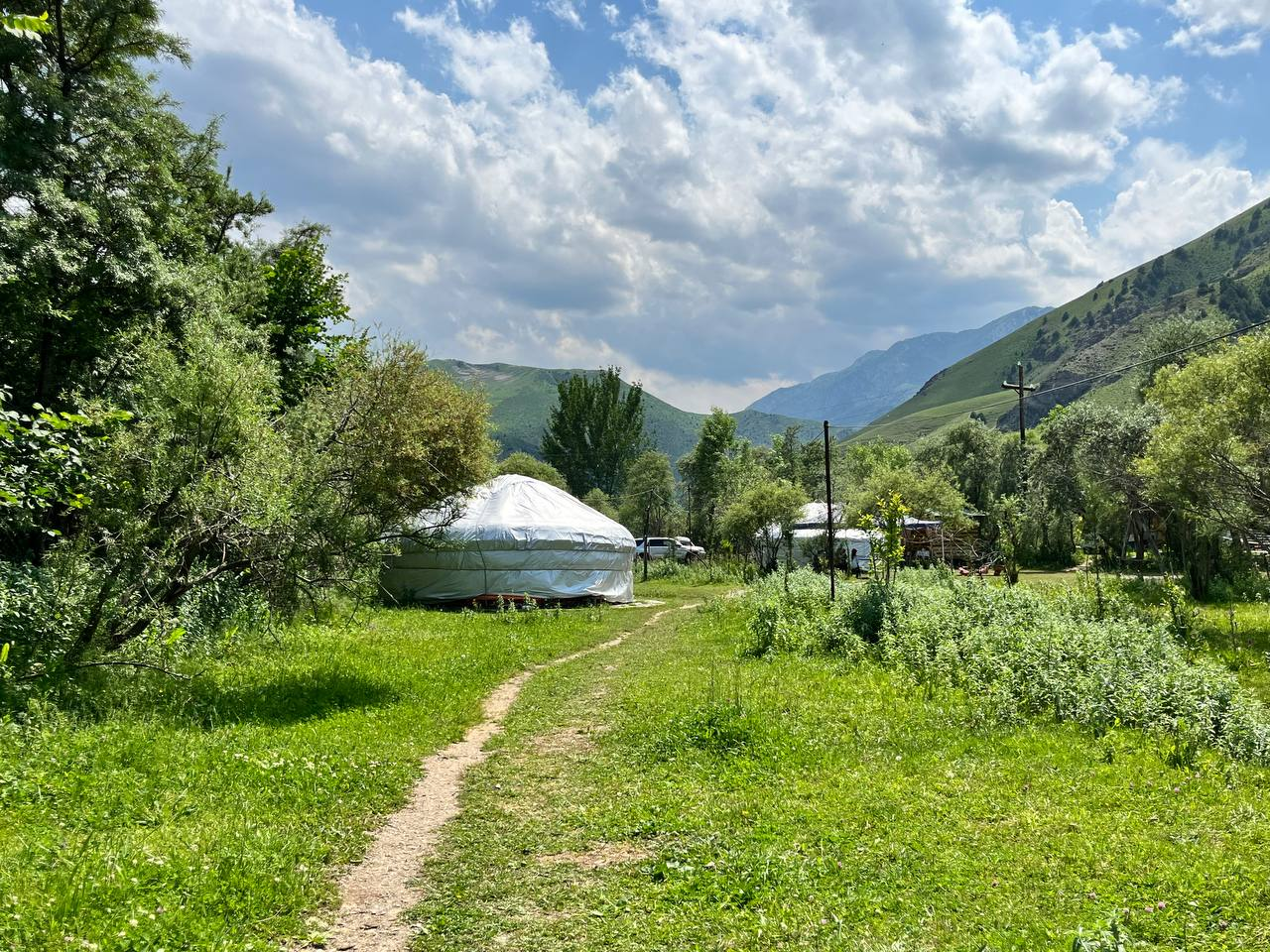
- Gulcha zoological reserve in Alai district, Osh region

- Location within Kyrgyzstan
- Location: Osh Region, Kyrgyzstan
- Coordinates: 40.48°N 73.23°E
- Area: 600 hectares (1,500 acres)
- Established: 1968

Gülchö Game Reserve is a protected area in Alay District, Osh Region, Kyrgyzstan. It was established in 1968 with a purpose of conservation of sea-buckthorn inhabited by pheasant. The reserve covers 600 hectares (1,500 acres) in the floodplain of the river Kurshab.
