= Janggakty Botanical Reserve =

Botanical Reserve in Kyrgyzstan

- IUCN category IV (habitat/species management area)
- Location within Kyrgyzstan
- Location: Leylek District, Batken Region, Kyrgyzstan
- Coordinates: 39°52′N 69°50′E
- Area: 80 ha (200 acres)
- Established: 1975

The Janggakty Botanical Reserve (Kyrgyz: Жаңгакты ботаникалык заказниги, also Жанчыкты Janchykty) is located in Leylek District of Batken Region of Kyrgyzstan. It was established in 1975 with a purpose of conservation of the Red Book listed endemic Tulipa affinis. The botanical reserve occupies 80 hectares.
