= Jylgyndy Forest Reserve =

- Kyrgyz: Жылгынды заказниги
- IUCN category IV (habitat/species management area)
- Location: Nookat District, Osh Region, Kyrgyzstan
- Area: 300 ha (740 acres)
- Established: 1975

The Jylgyndy Forest Reserve (Kyrgyz: Жылгынды заказниги) is located in the Toktomat Zulpuev rural community, Nookat District, Osh Region, Kyrgyzstan. It was established in 1975 with a purpose of conservation of pistachio (Pistacia vera) habitat. The forest reserve occupies 300 hectares.
