= Oy-Kayyng Botanical Reserve =

Botanical Reserve located in Kyrgyzstan

- Kyrgyz: Ой-Кайың заказниги
- IUCN category IV (habitat/species management area)
- Location within Kyrgyzstan
- Location: Alay District, Osh Region, Kyrgyzstan
- Coordinates: 39°56′N 73°51′E
- Area: 50 ha (120 acres)
- Established: 1975

The Oy-Kayyng Botanical Reserve (Kyrgyz: Ой-Кайың ботаникалык заказниги) is located in Alay District of Osh Region of Kyrgyzstan. It was established in 1975 to protect the habitat of endemic Ostrowskia magnifica. The botanical reserve occupies 50 hectares.
