= Ming-Kush Botanical Reserve =

- IUCN category IV (habitat/species management area)
- Location within Kyrgyzstan
- Location: Jumgal District, Naryn Region, Kyrgyzstan
- Coordinates: 41°42′N 74°36′E
- Area: 76.7 ha (190 acres)
- Established: 1984

The Ming-Kush Botanical Reserve is located in Jumgal District of Naryn Region of Kyrgyzstan. It was established in 1984 with a purpose of conservation of Ammopiptanthus nanus. The botanical reserve occupies 76.7 hectares.
