= Surmatash Nature Reserve =

Nature reserve in Kyrgyzstan

- Location within Kyrgyzstan
- Location: Kadamjay District, Batken Region, Kyrgyzstan
- Coordinates: 39°50′N 72°02′E
- Area: 661.94 km^{2} (255.58 sq mi)
- Established: 2009

The Surmatash Nature Reserve (Kyrgyz: Сурматаш мамлекеттик коругу, Russian: Сурматашский государственный заповедник) is located in Kadamjay District of Batken Region of Kyrgyzstan. Established in 2009, it currently covers 661.94 km^{2} (255.58 sq mi). Its purpose is conservation of unique nature complexes and biological diversity, protection of rare and threatened species of flora and fauna, and extending network of specially protected nature areas.

It is situated in the Alay Range, around the upper course of the river Isfayramsay and its tributaries Surmatash, Tengizbay, Shebe and Tegirmech.
