= Kichi Ak-Suu Forest Reserve =

- IUCN category IV (habitat/species management area)
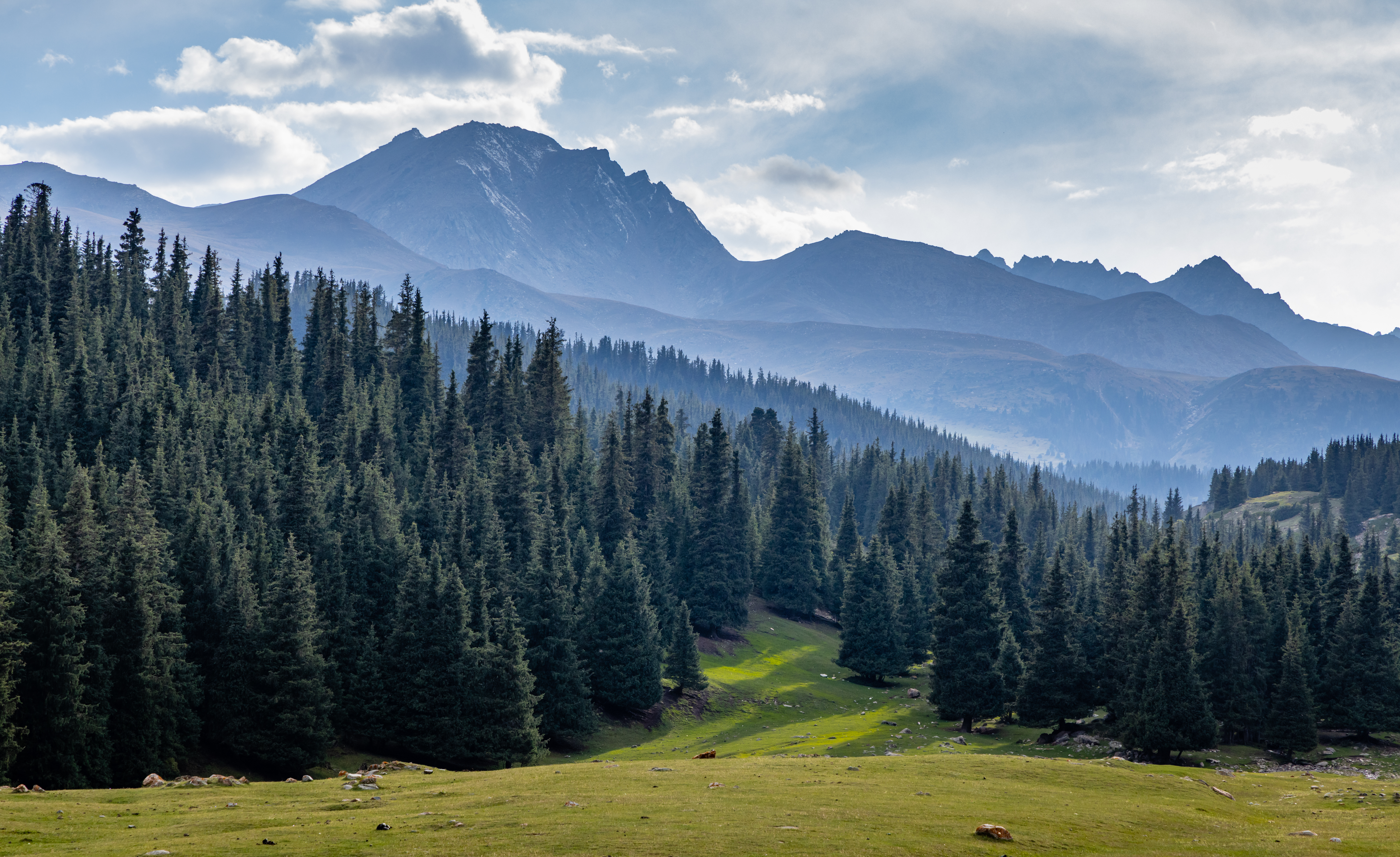
- Chong Ak Suu gorge in the Kichi Ak Suu sanctuary

- Location within Kyrgyzstan
- Location: Issyk-Kul District, Issyk-Kul Region, Kyrgyzstan
- Coordinates: 42°54′N 77°27′E
- Area: 100 ha (250 acres)
- Established: 1977

The Kichi Ak-Suu Forest Reserve (Kyrgyz: Кичи Ак-Суу токой заказниги, Russian: Лесной заказник Малая Ак-Суу) is located in the Anan'yevo rural community, Issyk-Kul District, Issyk-Kul Region, Kyrgyzstan. Established in 1977, it covers 100 hectares on the south slopes of the Küngöy Ala-Too Range. Its purpose is conservation of natural forests composed of Short-needled Schrenk's spruce (Picea schrenkiana subsp. tianshanica (Rupr.) Bykov.).
