= Tong District =

Tong Тоң району
- District
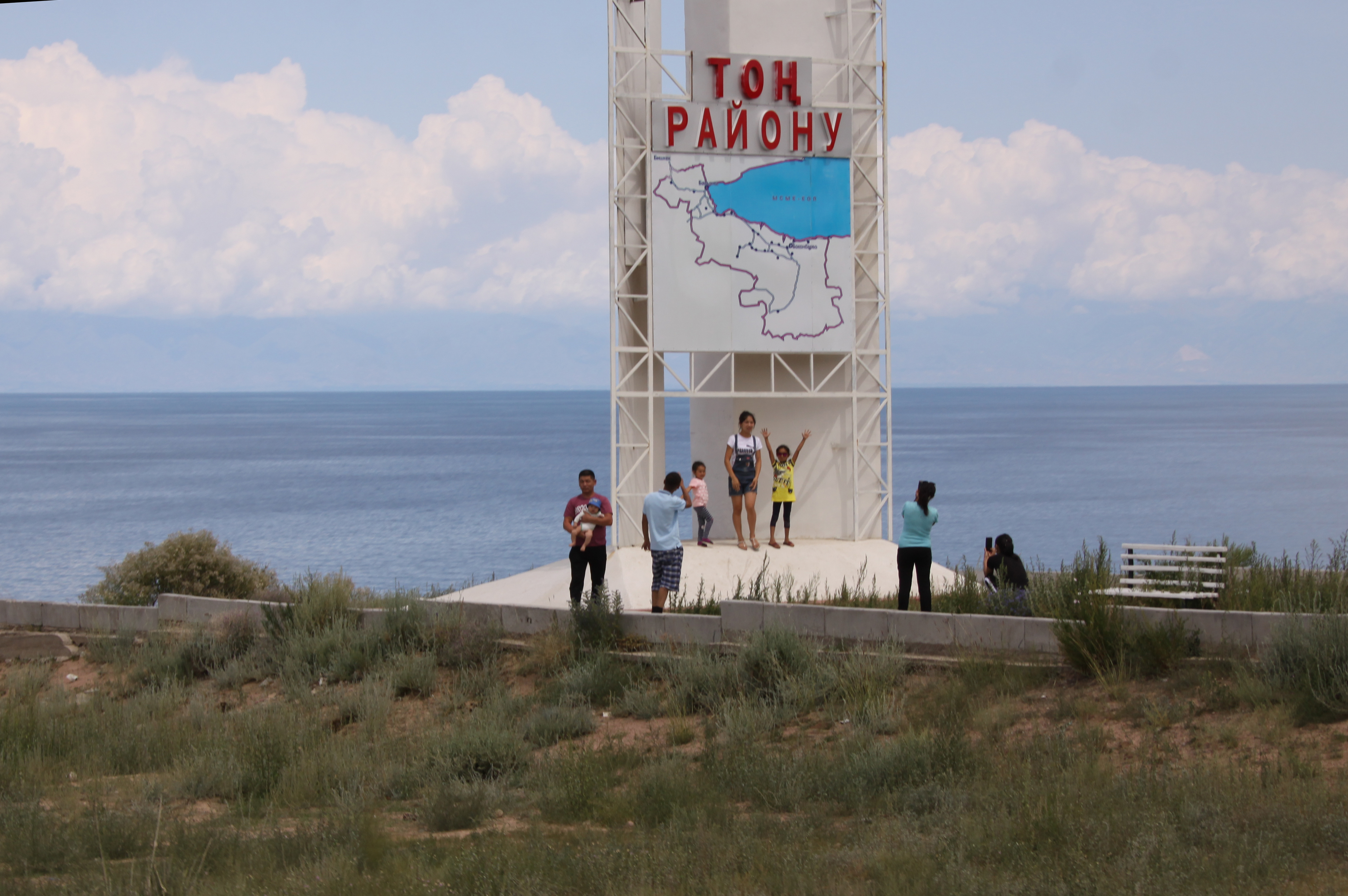

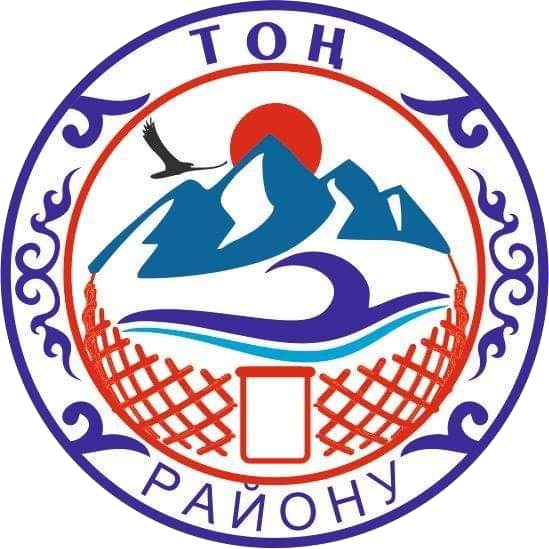
- Coat of arms

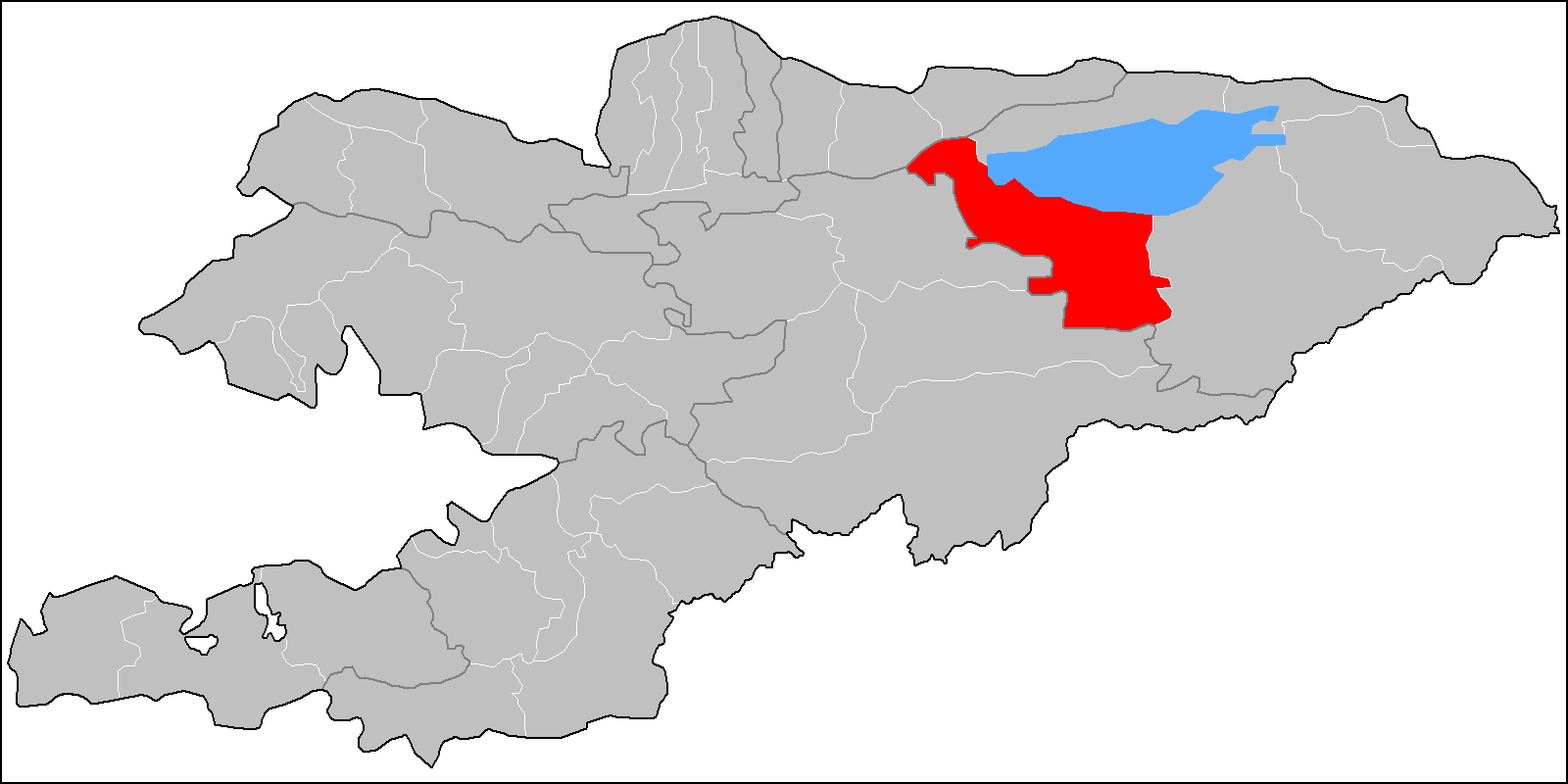
- Coordinates: 42°05′N 77°00′E
- Country: Kyrgyzstan
- Region: Issyk-Kul Region

Area
  - Total: 7,230 km^{2} (2,790 sq mi)

Population (2021)
  - Total: 53,401
  - Density: 7.39/km^{2} (19.1/sq mi)
- Time zone: UTC+6

Tong (Kyrgyz: Тоң району, romanized: Tong rayonu) is a district of Issyk-Kul Region in north-eastern Kyrgyzstan. The seat lies at Bökönbaev. Its area is 7,230 square kilometres (2,790 sq mi), and its resident population was 53,401 in 2021. Tong District borders Issyk-Kul District to the north-west, Jeti-Ögüz District to the south and south-east, Kochkor District to the south-west, Naryn District to the south, Kemin District to the north-west, and Issyk Kul - to the north.

== Geography ==
The district is located between the southern shore of Issyk-Kul lake and Teskey Ala-Too Range and features natural passage from the depression to the west through the Boom Gorge. The foothills of the range are composed of Mesozoic and Cenozoic deposits, and severely dissected by gullies, ravines and river valleys. The lake area extends with lakeside planes and river fans, sometimes interrupted by foothill ridges. Syrts stretch to the south of Teskey Ala-Too Range. Approximately 89% of the district is occupied by mountains, and 11% - by valleys. The hydrological conditions are dominated by Tong river, Ak-Sai river, Ak-Terek River, and Tuura-Suu.

== Climate ==
An average temperature in January is -4°C in valleys, and -16°C in mountains. In July, an average temperature varies from +18°C in valleys, to +10°C in mountains. An absolute recorded temperature minimum is -30°. Average maximum temperatures are +30°C in valleys, and +15°C in mountains. Average yearly precipitation is 200-300 mm in valleys, and 300-400 mm in mountains. An average snow cover is up to 10 cm. Almost no snow cover was observed near Balykchy. The maximum wind reaches 45 m/s once in 20 years.

== Population ==
Historical population
Year	Pop.	±% p.a.
1970	39,623	—
1979	43,683	+1.09%
1989	49,181	+1.19%
1999	46,701	−0.52%
2009	49,130	+0.51%
2021	53,401	+0.70%
Note: resident population; Sources:

== Populated places ==
In total, Tong District includes 30 villages located in nine rural communities (ayyl aymagy). Each rural community can consist of one or several villages. The rural communities and settlements in the Tong District are:

1. Ak-Terek (seat: Kara-Koo; incl. Ala-Bash, Bar-Bulak, Döng-Talaa, Komsomol and Kyzyl-Tuu)
2. Bolot Mambetov (seat: Eshperov; incl. Ak-Say, Jer-Üy and Kök-Say)
3. Kajy-Say (seat: Kajy-Say)
4. Kök-Moynok (seat: Ak-Ölöng; incl. Kök-Moynok-1 and Kök-Moynok-2)
5. Köl-Tör (seat: Toguz-Bulak; incl. Köl-Tör and Kongur-Ölöng)
6. Kün-Chygysh (seat: Bökönbaev; incl. Archaly)
7. Tong (seat: Tong; incl. Kajy-Saz and Ak-Say)
8. Tört-Kül (seat: Tört-Kül, incl. Temir-Kanat and Tuura-Suu)
9. Ulakol (seat: Ottuk; incl. Kara-Talaa, Kara-Shaar, Tuura-Suu and Shor-Bulak)

Note: Balykchy is a town of regional significance of Issyk-Kul Region, and is not part of the Tong District.

Settlements of the Tong District
