= List of Red Lists =

List of conservation registers

This list is of Red Lists, Red Data Books, and related initiatives that assess and document the extinction risk of species, whether on an international or more local level (regional Red Lists). The IUCN has published a set of Guidelines for Application of the IUCN Red List Criteria at Regional and National Levels and at least 113 countries have produced their own Red Lists. Below, where a particular article or set of articles on a foreign-language Wikipedia provides fuller coverage, a link is provided.

== International ==
International Union for Conservation of Nature

- IUCN Red List

European Union

- European Red List

== Angola ==
Angola: Lista Vermelha de Espécies de Angola, published by the Ministério do Ambiente

== Armenia ==
Armenia: ԿԱՐՄԻՐ ԳԻՐՔ, published by the Ministry of Environment; Armenian: Հայաստանի Կարմիր գիրք

== Australia ==
Australia: Species Profile and Threats Database, published by the Department of Agriculture, Water and the Environment

== Azerbaijan ==
Azerbaijan: Azerbaijani: Azərbaycan Qırmızı Kitabı

== Belarus ==
Belarus: Belarusian: Чырвоная кніга Рэспублікі Беларусь

== Brazil ==
Brazil: Livro Vermelho da Fauna Brasileira Ameaçada de Extinção, published by the Chico Mendes Institute for Biodiversity Conservation

== Bulgaria ==
Bulgaria: Червена книга на Република България (Red Data Book of the Republic of Bulgaria), published by the Bulgarian Academy of Sciences and Ministry of Environment and Water; Bulgarian: Червена книга на Република България

== Canada ==
Canada: Species at risk public registry, published by the Government of Canada

== China ==
China: 中国生物多样性红色名录, published by the Ministry of Ecology and Environment: 脊椎动物卷 (vertebrates) 高等植物卷 (higher plants); 中国生物多样性红色名录 脊椎动物 第一卷 哺乳动物 (Mammals); cf. Chinese: 国家重点保护野生动物名录, 国家重点保护野生植物名录

== Colombia ==
Colombia: Libros Rojos, published by the Ministry of Environment and Sustainable Development

== Czech Republic ==
Czech: Červené seznamy, published by the Nature Conservation Agency of the Czech Republic; Czech: Stupeň ohrožení v Česku

== Denmark ==
Denmark: Den danske Rødliste, published by Aarhus University; Danish: Den danske rødliste

== Finland ==
Finland: Suomen lajien uhanalaisuus – Punainen kirja, jointly published by the Ministry of the Environment; Web Service of the Red List of Finnish Species, published on the Finnish Biodiversity Information Facility

== France ==
France: La Liste rouge des espèces menacées en France; Inventaire national du patrimoine naturel, published by the National Museum of Natural History

== Germany ==
Germany: German: Rote Liste gefährdeter Tiere, Pflanzen und Pilze Deutschlands

== Greece ==
Greece: Το Κόκκινο Βιβλίο των Απειλούμενων Ζώων της Ελλάδας, published by the Hellenic Zoological Society; Greek: Κόκκινο Βιβλίο των Απειλούμενων Σπονδυλόζωων της Ελλάδας

== Iceland ==
Iceland: Válistar published by the Icelandic Institute of Natural History; Icelandic: Válisti

== Ireland ==
Ireland: Ireland Red List, published by the National Parks and Wildlife Service, made by a collaboration between the NPWS, the Northern Ireland Environment Agency, and the National Biological Data Centres North and South.

== Italy ==
Italy: Liste Rosse Nazionali, published by the Ministry of the Ecological Transition

== Japan ==
Japan: Ministry of the Environment Red List

== Kazakhstan ==
Kazakhstan: Kazakh: Қазақстанның Қызыл кітабы

== Kyrgyzstan ==
Kyrgyzstan: Кыргыз Республикасынын Кызыл китеби; Russian: Красная книга Киргизской Республики

== Latvia ==
Latvia: Latvian: Latvijas Sarkanā grāmata

== Lithuania ==
Lithuania: Lithuanian: Lietuvos raudonoji knyga

== Moldova ==
Moldova: Cartea roșie a Republicii Moldova, published by the Academy of Sciences of Moldova and Ministry of Environment; Romanian: Cartea Roșie a Republicii Moldova

== Netherlands ==
Netherlands: Dutch: Rode lijsten

== New Zealand ==
New Zealand: New Zealand Threat Classification System, published by the Department of Conservation

== Nicaragua ==
Nicaragua: Lista Roja, Especies en Alto Riesgo

== Norway ==
Norway: Norsk rødliste for arter, published by Artsdatabanken; Norwegian: Norsk rødliste for arter

== Philippines ==
Philippines: National List of Threatened Fauna, maintained by the Department of Environment and Natural Resources

== Poland ==
Poland: Polska Czerwona Księga Zwierząt; Polska Czerwona Księga Roślin; Polish: Polska czerwona księga zwierząt, Polska czerwona księga roślin

== Russia ==
Russia: Red Data Book of the Russian Federation; also by Federal subject — Sakhalin Oblast: Красная Книга Сахалинской области: Животные / Растения и грибы; Category:Красные книги по субъектам Российской Федерации

== South Africa ==
South Africa: Red List of South African Plants, published by the South African National Biodiversity Institute.

== South Korea ==
South Korea: 한국의 멸종위기 야생동·식물 적색자료집, published by the Ministry of Environment and National Institute of Biological Resources (Red Data Book 1 = Birds 조류, 2 = Amphibians and Reptiles 양서류·파충류, 3 = Fish 어류, 4 = Mammals 포유동물, 5 = Vascular Plants 관속식물); Korean: 대한민국의 멸종위기 야생 동·식물

== Spain ==
Spain: Libro rojo de los vertebrados de España, Atlas y libro rojo de la flora vascular amenazada de España, published by the Ministry of Environment

== Sri Lanka ==
Sri Lanka: The National Red List 2012 of Sri Lanka, published by the Ministry of Environment

== Sweden ==
Sweden: Rödlistade arter i Sverige, published by the Swedish University of Agricultural Sciences (SLU Artdatabanken) Swedish: Rödlistade arter i Sverige

== Switzerland ==
Switzerland: Rote Listen: Gefährdete Arten der Schweiz, published by the Federal Office for the Environment; cf. German: Blaue Liste der erfolgreich erhaltenen oder geförderten Tier- und Pflanzenarten

== Taiwan ==
Taiwan: 紅皮書名錄, published by the Endemic Species Research Institute and Forestry Bureau; (Red List 1 = birds 臺灣鳥類紅皮書名錄, 2 = terrestrial reptiles 臺灣陸域爬行類紅皮書名錄, 3 = amphibians 臺灣兩棲類紅皮書名錄, 4 = freshwater fishes 臺灣淡水魚類紅皮書名錄, 5 = terrestrial mammals 臺灣陸域哺乳類紅皮書名錄, 6 = vascular plants 臺灣維管束植物紅皮書名錄)

== Tajikistan ==
Tajikistan: Tajik: Китоби сурхи Ҷумҳурии Тоҷикистон

== Turkmenistan ==
Turkmenistan: Türkmenistanyň Gyzyl Kitaby, published by the Ministry of Nature Protection; Russian: Красная книга Туркменистана

== Ukraine ==
Ukraine: Red Data Book of Ukraine

== United Kingdom ==
United Kingdom: Conservation designations for UK taxa, published by the JNCC

== United States of America ==
USA: Federal Lists of Endangered and Threatened Wildlife and Plants, published by the United States Fish and Wildlife Service

== Uzbekistan ==
Uzbekistan: O'zbekiston Respublikasining Qizil kitobi; Red Data Book of Uzbekistan; Russian: Красная книга Узбекистана

== Vietnam ==
Vietnam: Vietnam's Red Data Book

== See also ==
- List of heritage registers
