= Tulipa ferganica =

Conservation status
- Least Concern (IUCN 3.1)

Scientific classification
- Kingdom: Plantae
- Clade: Tracheophytes
- Clade: Angiosperms
- Clade: Monocots
- Order: Liliales
- Family: Liliaceae
- Subfamily: Lilioideae
- Tribe: Lilieae
- Genus: Tulipa
- Species: T. ferganica

Binomial name
- Tulipa ferganica Vved.

Synonyms
- Tulipa altaica var. ferganica (Vved.) Raamsd.

Species of plant

Tulipa ferganica is a species of flowering plant in the family Liliaceae, native to Uzbekistan and Kyrgyzstan. It has bright yellow flowers with the three outer petals brushed a brownish-pink, and its slender grey-green leaves have wavy edges. A bulbous geophyte reaching 15 to 25 cm (6 to 10 in), it is typically found growing on the rocky hillsides surrounding the Fergana Valley. One of the so-called species tulips, it may be available from specialty suppliers.
