= Jargylchak Game Reserve =

Protected area in Kyrgyzstan

- IUCN category IV (habitat/species management area)
- Location within Kyrgyzstan
- Location: Kyrgyzstan
- Coordinates: 42°05′N 77°46′E
- Area: 23,098 ha (57,080 acres)
- Established: 1990

Jargylchak Game Reserve (Kyrgyz: Жаргылчак зоологиялык (аң уулоочу) заказниги) is a specially protected area located in river basins of Chong Jargylchak and Kichi Jargylchak of Jeti-Ögüz District of Issyk-Kul Region of Kyrgyzstan. It was established in 1990 to conserve and reproduce game animals such as wild boar, Capreolus, wild goat, red deer, Turkestan lynx (Lynx lynx isabellinus), Himalayan brown bear, snow leopard, golden eagle, bearded vulture, and so on. The reserve's area is 23,098 hectares.
