= Bökönbaev =

Bökönbai Бөкөнбай
- Administrative center of Tong District
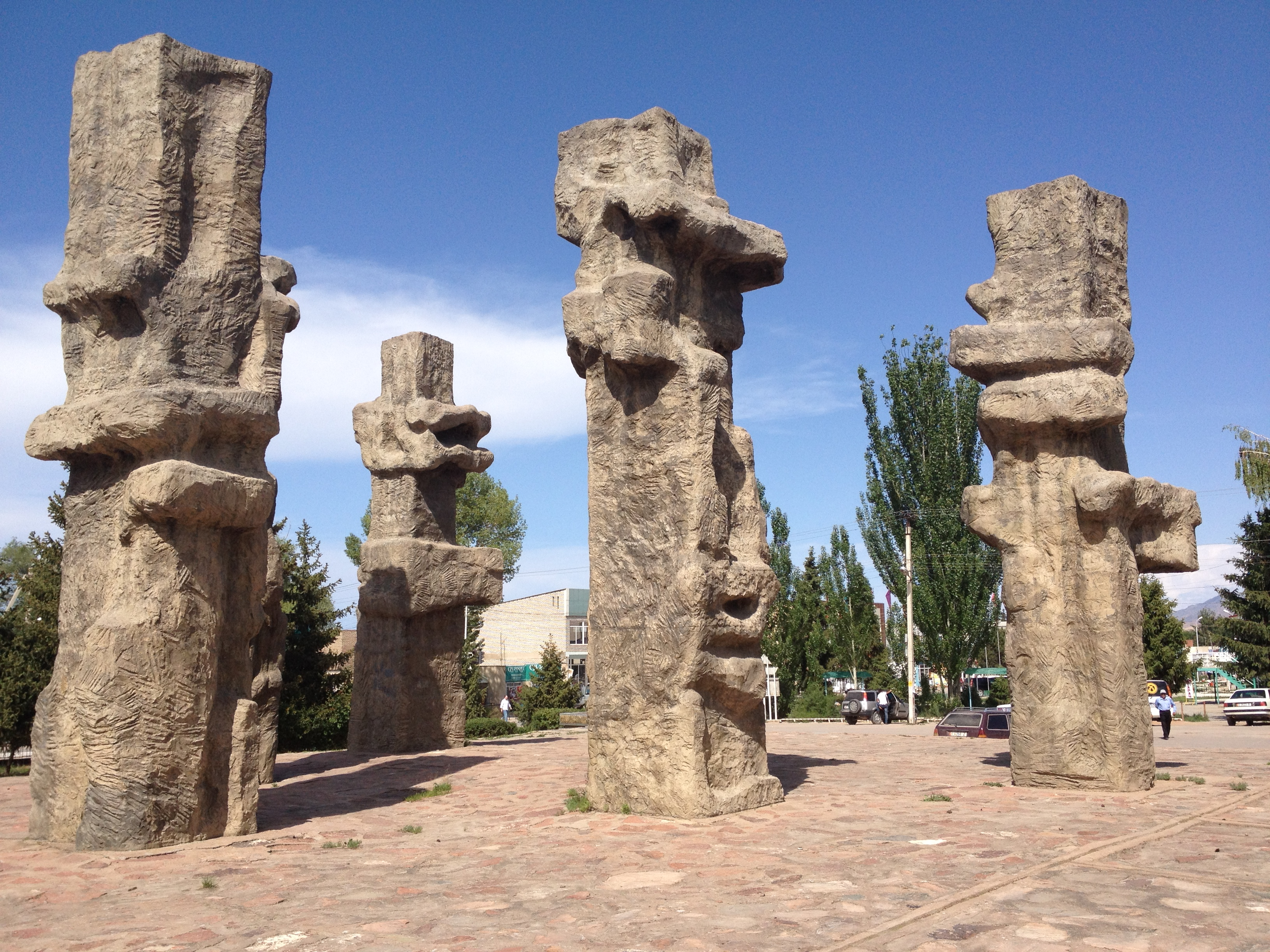

- Location within Kyrgyzstan
- Coordinates: 42°6′36″N 76°59′24″E
- Country: Kyrgyzstan
- Region: Issyk-Kul
- District: Tong
- Established: 1912

Government
  - Akim: Astanakulov Baiyshbek Kahromanovich

Area
  - Total: 11 km^{2} (4.2 sq mi)
- Elevation: 1,809 m (5,935 ft)

Population (2021)
  - Total: ▲14,267
- Time zone: UTC+6

Bökönbai (Kyrgyz: Бөкөнбай, Russian: Боконбаево, romanized: Bokonbayevo) is a village in the Issyk-Kul Region of Kyrgyzstan. The village is named in honor of the well-known poet and playwright Joomart Bökönbayev. It is the seat of the Tong District and of the Kün-Chygysh village community. It was established as Kol'tsovka village in 1912. With a population of 14,267 (2021), it is the largest village on the south shore of lake Issyk Kul. Its industry declined after the collapse of the USSR. It is now a base for tourism into the mountains to the south. There are demonstrations of falconry with eagles. The road to the west to Balykchy goes through dry and less-attractive country.

== Population ==
Historical population
Year	Pop.	±% p.a.
1989	10,754	—
2001	10,870	+0.09%
2009	10,648	−0.26%
2021	14,267	+2.47%
Note: resident population; Sources:

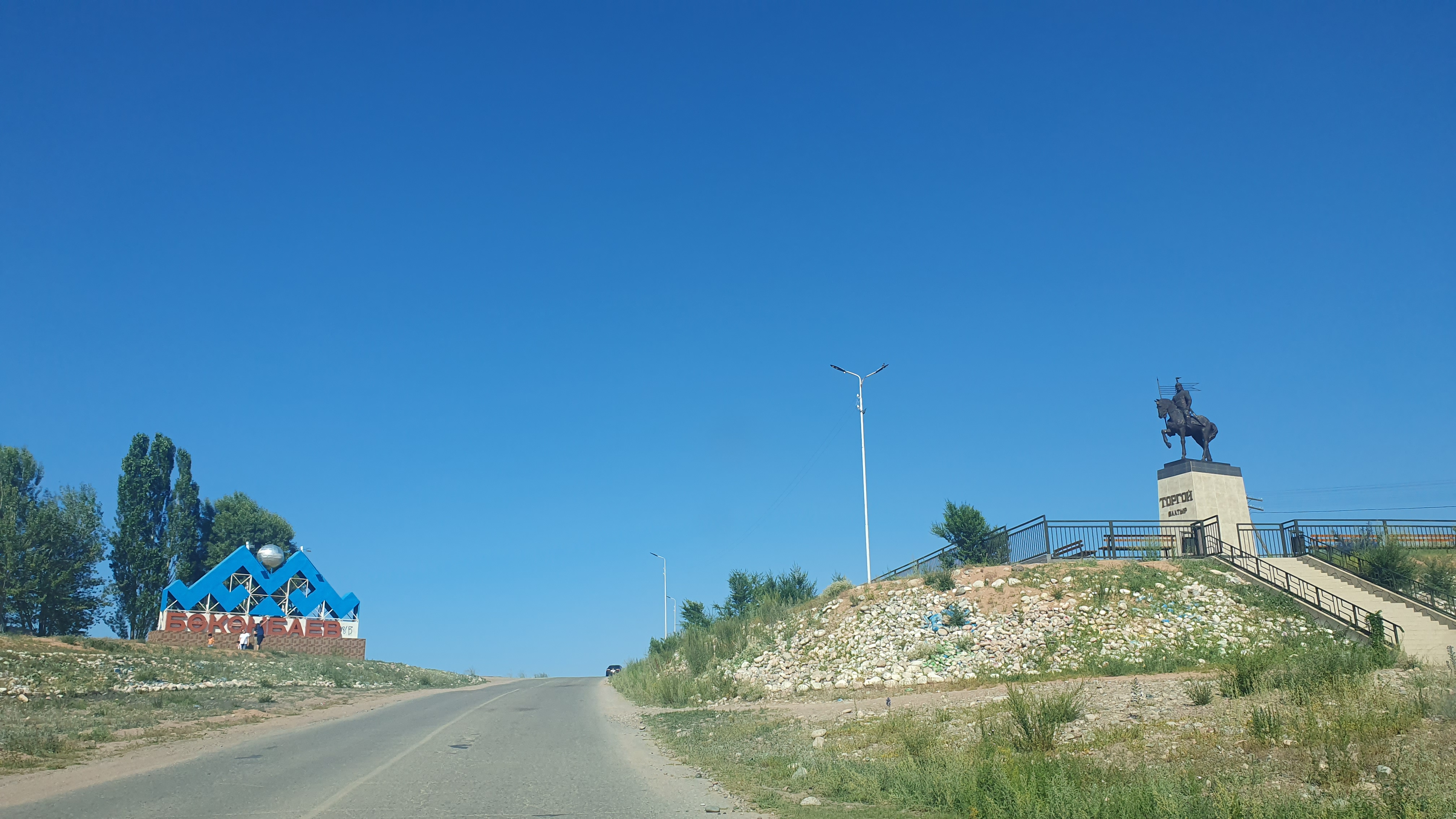
Main entrance to Bokonbaevo.
