= List of rivers of Kyrgyzstan =

This is a list of rivers that are at least partially in Kyrgyzstan. The rivers are grouped by drainage basin. Rivers flowing into other rivers are listed by the rivers they flow into. Some rivers (e.g. Syr Darya) do not flow through Kyrgyzstan themselves, but they are mentioned for having Kyrgyz tributaries. They are given in italics. For clarity, only rivers with a drainage basin area over 1,000 km^{2} are shown. For an alphabetical overview of rivers of Kyrgyzstan, see the category Rivers of Kyrgyzstan. In total, there are 2044 rivers with a length of more than 10 km in Kyrgyzstan with a total length of about 35000 km.

== Syr Darya basin ==
The Syr Darya drains a large part of Kyrgyzstan through its source rivers Naryn and Kara Darya, and a number of tributaries in the Ferghana Valley. It discharges into the North Aral Sea.

- Syr Darya
  - Chirchiq
    - Chatkal
      - Chandalash
  - Ak-Suu
  - Kozu-Baglan
  - Isfara
  - Sokh
    - Kojo-Ashkan
  - Kasansay
  - Shohimardonsoy/Shaymerden
  - Isfayramsay
  - Naryn
    - Kara-Suu (right)
    - Kara-Suu (left)
    - Uzun-Akmat
    - Chychkan
    - Kökömeren
      - Jumgal
      - Suusamyr
      - Batysh Karakol
    - Kökirim
    - Ala-Buga
      - Jamandavan
      - Bychan
    - At-Bashy
      - Kara-Koyun
    - Kajyrty
    - On-Archa
    - Chong Naryn
    - Kichi Naryn
  - Kara Darya
    - Aravansay
    - Kara-Üngkür/Tentek-Say
    - Ak-Buura
    - Kögart
    - Kurshab
    - Jazy
    - Tar
    - Kara-Kulja

== Talas basin ==
The Talas drains the Talas Region in northwestern Kyrgyzstan, and disappears into the Muyunkum Desert in Kazakhstan.

- Talas
  - Ürmaral
  - Üchkoshoy
  - Karakol

== Chu basin ==
The Chu (Kyrgyz: Chüy) drains part of northern Kyrgyzstan, and disappears into the Betpak-Dala Desert in Kazakhstan.

- Chu
  - Ala-Archa
  - Alamüdün
  - Kuragaty
  - Aspara/Ashmara
  - Chong-Kemin
  - Jardy Kayyngdy
  - Joon-Aryk
  - Jylamysh
  - Kara-Kujur
  - Kichi Kemin
  - Kochkor
  - Ysyk-Ata

== Ili basin ==
A small area in northeastern Kyrgyzstan is drained by the Karkyra towards the Ili, which discharges into Lake Balkash.

- Ili
  - Charyn
    - Karkyra

== Tarim basin ==
The southeastern part of Kyrgyzstan and the eastern Alay Valley are drained by tributaries of the Tarim, which disappears in the Tarim Basin.

- Tarim
  - Aksu/Saryjaz
    - Toshkan/Kakshaal/Aksay
      - Üzönggükuush
      - Kök-Kyia
      - Müdürüm
      - Terek
    - Ak-Shyyrak
    - Üchköl
    - Engilchek
  - Kashgar
    - Eastern Kyzyl-Suu

== Amu Darya basin ==
The western Alay Valley is drained by the Kyzyl-Suu towards the Amu Darya, which discharges into the South Aral Sea.

- Amu Darya
  - Vakhsh/Kyzyl-Suu
    - Kök-Suu

== Issyk-Kul basin ==
Much of northeastern Kyrgyzstan is drained by several rivers towards the endorheic lake Issyk-Kul.

- Barskoon
- Tüp
- Jyrgalang
- Karakol
