= Kara-Shoro Nature Park =

National park in Kyrgyzstan

- IUCN category II (national park)
- Location within Kyrgyzstan
- Location: Özgön District, Osh Region, Kyrgyzstan
- Nearest city: Özgön
- Coordinates: 40°45′N 74°04′E
- Area: 14,440 ha (35,700 acres)
- Established: 1996

Kara-Shoro Nature Park (Kyrgyz: Кара-Шоро мамлекеттик жаратылыш паркы, Russian: Государственный природный парк Кара-Шоро) is a national park in Kyrgyzstan established in August 1996. The purpose of the park is conservation of the nature complex including geological formations, hydrological regimes, flora and fauna, and endangered species. It covers 14,440 hectares. Kara-Shoro River passes through the central part of the park.

== Topography ==
The park is situated at the south-western slopes of the Fergana Range, in Özgön District, on the upper course of the river Jazy. The topography embraces rocky mountains with pinnacle summits and cliffy crests, narrow and deep gorges with long and steep-sided slopes and rockslides. The slopes of the ridges are chasmy with numerous branching gorges forming a complex system of the secondary fissures. Slope gradients reach 35-45 degrees and more. The lowest altitude of the park is 1,900 m above sea level and the maximum - 3,500.

== Flora ==
The flora diversity is high. Among dominant species supported by the park are subspecies of Schrenk's spruce (Picea schrenkiana subsp. tianschanica), Savin Juniperus sabina, Juniperus semiglobosa, Birch, Acer turkestanicum, Malus, Populus, Willow, Crataegus, Sorbus tianschanica and various shrubs. Additionally, around 50 species of herbaceous plans are reported. Medicinal herbs occurring in the park include Mongolian ephedra, Urtica dioica, Aconitum soongaricum, Adonis (Adonis chrysocyathus Hook.f. & Thomson), and Leonurus (Leonurus turkestanicus V.I.Krecz. & Kuprian).

== Fauna ==
The park is inhabited by 12 species of animals, of them 4 are listed in the Red Book of Kyrgyz Republic, specifically Brown bear, Eurasian lynx, Snow leopard, and Capreolus. Of 21 species of birds occurring the park 8 are included in the Red Book: Saker falcon, Pallas's fish eagle, White-tailed eagle, Egyptian vulture, Cinereous vulture, Eastern imperial eagle, Golden eagle, and Great bustard.
