= 1990 Osh clashes =

Kyrgyz–Uzbek ethnic conflict in the Kirghiz SSR

Coordinates: 40.53°N 72.8°E

Osh riots
| Date | 4–6 June 1990 (2 days) |
| Location | Osh, Kyrgyz SSR |
| Result | 46 out of 48 rioters convicted |

Belligerents
| Uzbek rioters: Adolat | Kyrgyz rioters: Osh Aymaghi | Soviet Union: Soviet Armed Forces; Militsiya |

Casualties and losses
- 300-600 deaths (official estimate); 1,000-10,000 (unofficial estimate)

1990 Osh riots (Kyrgyz: Ош окуясы; Uzbek: Oʻsh voqeasi, Ўш воқеаси; Russian: Ошская резня) were an ethnic conflict between Kyrgyz and Uzbeks that took place in June 1990 in the cities of Osh and Uzgen, part of the Kirghiz SSR. The immediate cause of the riots was a dispute between an Uzbek nationalist group Adolat and a Kyrgyz nationalist group Osh Aymaghi over the land of a former collective farm. While official estimates of the death toll range from over 300 to more than 600, unofficial figures range up to more than 1,000. The riots have been seen as a forerunner to the 2010 ethnic clashes in the same region.

== Historical background ==
Prior to the Soviet period, the inhabitants of the Osh region of the Fergana Valley referred to themselves as Kipchaks. In the 1920s, using language as the key determinant of ethnicity, Soviet ethnographers classified the lowland Kipchaks as Uzbeks and the highland Kipchaks as Kyrgyz. Although in the 1930s, Joseph Stalin divided the rich Fergana Valley among Kirghizia, Uzbekistan and Tajikistan, nationalities were not necessarily confined to the borders drawn for them. Along the "Kyrgyz" side of the river Tentek-Say, there was a significant population of Uzbeks. Because of the region's oil reserves, the local intelligentsia was able to obtain a significant degree of affluence, but infrastructure remained underdeveloped. During the Khrushchev era most of the deportees from the 1930s onward left to find better work elsewhere. By the late Brezhnev era, there were already signs of unemployment.

By the late 1980s, the economic situation between both Kyrgyz and Uzbek populations had markedly noticeable differences. Uzbeks, who were traditionally the merchants and farmers of the region, benefited from the market conditions of the Gorbachev Era; Uzbeks also made up the largest number of workers in the most profitable industries, such as commerce and transportation. Perestroika had the opposite effect on the much larger Kyrgyz population. As collectives were disassembled and unemployment in the region grew, the Kyrgyz, who traditionally practiced animal husbandry, felt the brunt of the rising economic downturns—there was a housing deficiency and an unemployment rate of 22.8%. In addition to economic discrepancies, the ethnic ratios of the region's administrative posts did not respond to the demographics of the population. In 1990, the Uzbeks made up 26% of the region's population with the Kyrgyz at 60%, but only 4% of the key official posts were held by Uzbeks.

In the late 1980s, several inter-ethnic disputes had already plagued the Fergana region. Around June 1989 in the neighboring Uzbekistan, ethnic Uzbeks launched a series of pogroms against Meskhetian Turks, the cause of which was believed to have been rooted in the existing economic disparities between the two ethnicities. Similarly, in the Tajikistan, there were clashes between local Tajiks and Armenians who had recently been deported from Nagorno-Karabakh. In Kirghizia, ethnic tensions began to simmer in the spring of 1990 when Adolat (Uzbek for "justice"), an Uzbek nationalist group that claimed a membership of over 40,000, began to petition the Osh government for greater representation and the freedom for Uzbek language schooling, publications, and culture. At the same time, Osh Aymaghi, a Kyrgyz nationalist group, was petitioning for its own demands, the foremost of which was the redistribution of land belonging to Lenin Kolkhoz, a mostly Uzbek collective farm. The group was on the verge of seizing the land on its own when authorities finally agreed to redistribute some of the land, but their final decision to reallocate a large portion of Uzbek land to the Kyrgyz denomination with little compensation for the original inhabitants pleased neither party. Uzbek and Kyrgyz demonstrators gathered around the collective farm to protest the party's decision.

== Riots ==
The violence began on 4 June in the city of Osh after large groups of Kyrgyz and Uzbeks gathered in the territory of Lenin Kolkhoz. The riots started to spread to some other areas of Osh Province on that same day. In the city of Uzgen, violence started the next day. The immediate cause of the riots in Uzgen was a dispute between the Kyrgyz and Uzbeks in Uzgen's bazaars and bus stations.

During the riots some of the local militsiyas (the local Soviet police force) expressed loyalties to their own ethnic counterparts by taking part in the riots. Although supplies and vehicles used in the attacks were predominantly stolen by the young rioters, some local Kyrgyz elites who did not openly take part in the violence lent supplies and vehicles to the demonstrators.

The violence was not just confined to urban zones; in the villages surrounding Uzgen and the Osh countryside, Kyrgyz herders, often going by horseback, terrorized Uzbek farmers with rape, murder, and property destruction. In the foothills of Bak-Archa, four Kyrgyz shepherds rode many kilometers to kill the family of an Uzbek beekeeper. Uzbek tea houses (choyxonas) were also targeted, and several reports involve the abduction and rape of female tea house-goers.

In Frunze (now Bishkek), protesters demanded that the leaders of Kirghizia resign. On 6 June, Gorbachev finally called in the Soviet Army under the Soviet Ministry of Interior to enter the area of the conflict and stay stationed only within cities. The Uzbek-Kyrgyz border was sealed off to prevent Uzbeks from the neighboring Uzbekistan from joining the riots.

Official estimates of the death toll range from over 300 to more than 600. Unofficial figures range up to more than 10,000. According to unofficial estimates, more than 5,000 crimes were committed during the riots ranging from pillaging to murder. About 4,000 incidents were officially investigated and 3,215 acts of crime were registered. According to witnesses and personal testimonies, most of the rioters were young males, 29% of which were teenagers. Personal testimonies from victims, witnesses and participants revealed chemical intoxication was a significant influence on the rioters' actions.

== Aftermath ==
In the 1991 trials conducted by the new independent Kyrgyz government, 46 of the 48 participants were found guilty, with sentences ranging from 18 years in a maximum security prison to suspended sentences. Most of the defendants were Kyrgyz. This contrasted with the Osh riots of 2010, in which those arrested and sentenced were mainly ethnic Uzbeks.

With the 1991 independence of Kyrgyzstan, Uzbeks were not ensured much autonomy in the new government of Akayev and were held with deep suspicion by the general populace. In the mid-1990s Uzbeks occupied only 4.7% of the Osh regional posts. The economic depression following independence only heightened ethnic tensions in the following years. When law enforcement broke down in 2010, these hidden tensions were uncontrollable. That is one of the many reasons why speculators believe that the riots in 2010 were not just merely a repeat of those of 20 years before, but a continuation of the conflict.

A stone monument commemorating the riots was erected in the field where they ignited, with plaques in Russian, English, and Old Turkic.

== See also ==
- 2010 South Kyrgyzstan ethnic clashes
- 1990 Dushanbe riots
- 2024 Bishkek riots
