= Ak-Terek, Özgön =

Ak-Terek Ак-Терек
- Location within Kyrgyzstan
- Coordinates: 40°52′0″N 73°40′50″E
- Country: Kyrgyzstan
- Region: Osh
- District: Özgön

Population (2021)
  - Total: 1,349
- Time zone: UTC+6

Ak-Terek (Kyrgyz: Ак-Терек) is a village in Osh Region of Kyrgyzstan about 43 km northeast of Özgön and 4 km northeast of Salam-Alik on the Jazy river. It is part of the Özgön District. Its population was 1,349 in 2021. It is a base for horse trekking in the Fergana Range.
