= Jazy (river) =

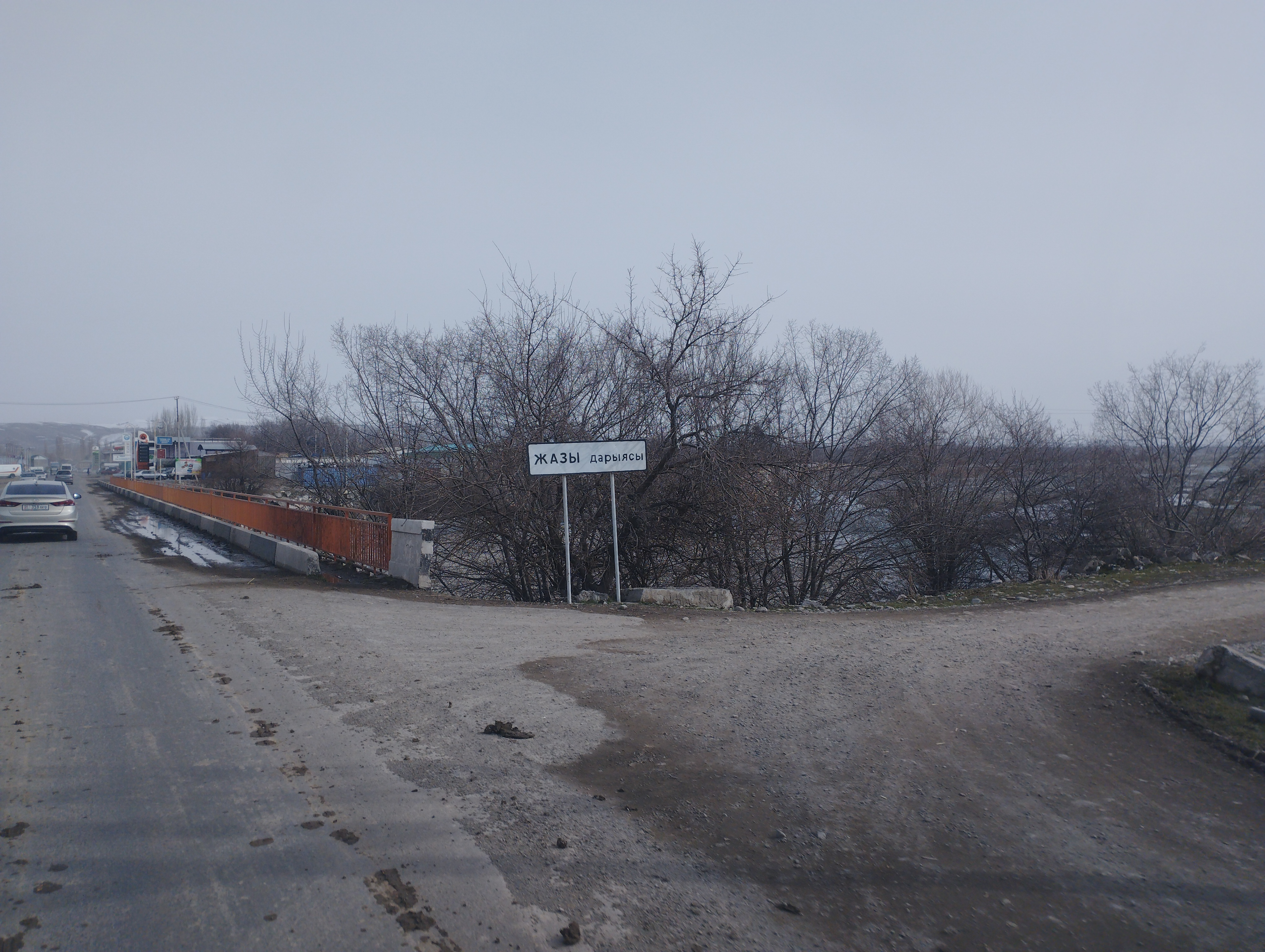
- Native name: Жазы (Kyrgyz)

Location
- Country: Kyrgyzstan
- Region: Osh Region
- District: Özgön District

Physical characteristics
- Source
  - location: Southwestern slope of the Fergana Range
- Mouth
  - location: Kara Darya
  - coordinates: 40°46′47″N 73°07′45″E
- Length: 122 km (76 mi)
- Basin size: 2,620 km^{2} (1,010 sq mi)
- Discharge
  - average: 34.2 m^{3}/s (1,210 cu ft/s)
  - minimum: 6.4 m^{3}/s (230 cu ft/s)
  - maximum: 418 m^{3}/s (14,800 cu ft/s)

Basin features
- Progression: Kara Darya→ Syr Darya→ North Aral Sea

The Jazy (Kyrgyz: Жазы; also Yassy, Яссы) is a river in Özgön District, Osh Region, Kyrgyzstan, and a major right tributary of the Kara Darya. It is 122 km (76 mi) long and has a drainage basin of 2,620 km^{2} (1,010 sq mi).

== Geography ==
The Jazy rises on the southwestern slopes of the Fergana Range. Its tributaries include the Baybiche, Karatöbö, Beshterek, Uluuchat, Zyndansuu, Salamalik, Kichi Koshbulak, Köldük, Doñuzsuu, Zerger and Jylandy rivers.

The river flows through or near Özgön, Myrza-Ake, Jylandy, Ilyich and Ak-Terek. It flows into the Andijan Reservoir, through which the Kara Darya flows.

== Hydrology ==
The mean annual discharge of the Jazy is 34.2 m^{3}/s (1,210 cu ft/s), with recorded discharges ranging from a minimum of 6.4 m^{3}/s (230 cu ft/s) to a maximum of 418 m^{3}/s (14,800 cu ft/s).

The river has a strongly seasonal flow regime. The high-water period begins in late March and continues until August. For the period 1980–2010, the mean annual discharge at the Salamalik gauging station was 22.2 m^{3}/s (780 cu ft/s). Mean monthly discharge increased from 8.8 m^{3}/s (310 cu ft/s) in March to 39.9 m^{3}/s (1,410 cu ft/s) in April, reaching 71.1 m^{3}/s (2,510 cu ft/s) in May. It remained high in June at 61.1 m^{3}/s (2,160 cu ft/s), before declining to 29.6 m^{3}/s (1,050 cu ft/s) in July and 15.1 m^{3}/s (530 cu ft/s) in August.

The river is used for irrigation.

== History ==
The valley of the Jazy formed part of an ancient route connecting the eastern Fergana Valley with the Inner Tian Shan. The archaeological site of Shorobashat, situated along the river, was a major fortified settlement in eastern Fergana, principally occupied during the 4th–1st centuries BC.

During the medieval period, a caravan route from Özgön followed the Jazy valley across the Fergana Range towards At-Bashy. Medieval Arab and Persian geographical accounts, including those of Qudama ibn Ja'far and Ibn Khordadbeh, contain descriptions of this route. The route continued through the Jazy Pass towards the Inner Tian Shan and formed part of the network linking Fergana with the regions of At-Bashy, southern Issyk-Kul and further east towards China.
