= Andijan Dam =

Dam in Andijan, Uzbekistan

- Location within Uzbekistan
- Country: Uzbekistan
- Location: Andijan, Andijan Region
- Coordinates: 40°46′9.18″N 73°3′45.95″E
- Purpose: Irrigation, power
- Status: Operational
- Construction began: 1969
- Opening date: 1974; 52 years ago
- Owner: Ministry of Agriculture and Water Resources

Dam and spillways
- Type of dam: Buttress
- Impounds: Kara Darya
- Height: 115 m (377 ft)
- Length: 1,115 m (3,658 ft)

Reservoir
- Creates: Andijan Reservoir
- Total capacity: 1,900,000,000 m^{3} (1,500,000 acre⋅ft)
- Surface area: 57.28 km^{2} (22.12 sq mi)

Power Station
- Commission date: Andijan 1:1974-1984; Andijan 2:2010
- Type: Conventional
- Hydraulic head: Andijan 1: 83 m (272 ft); Andijan 2: 82 m (269 ft)
- Turbines: Andijan 1: 4 x 35 MW; Andijan 2: 2 x 25 MW Francis-type
- Installed capacity: Andijan 1: 140 MW; Andijan 2: 50 MW; Total: 190 MW

The Andijan Dam is a buttress dam on the river Kara Darya near Andijan in Andijan Region, Uzbekistan. Its reservoir, known as the Andijan Reservoir in Uzbekistan and Kempir-Abad Reservoir in Kyrgyzstan, covers 56 km^{2} (22 sq mi) and stretches into the neighboring Osh Region of Kyrgyzstan.

The dam serves several purposes including irrigation in the Fergana Valley and hydroelectric power production. Water released from the dam can enter a canal on either side of the river downstream. The dam has two power stations located at its base, Andijan 1 and Andijan 2. The former contains four 35 MW turbine-generators and the latter contains two 25 MW Francis turbine-generators for a total installed capacity of 190 MW.

Construction on the dam began in 1969 and the generators at Andijan 1 were commissioned between 1974 and 1984. Construction at Andijan 2 began in 2007 and it was commissioned on 2 September 2010. It cost US$28.5 million of which US$15.93 million was provided by the Exim Bank of China.

The artificial lake created by this dam, the Andijan Reservoir, is fed by the Kara Darya and its tributaries Kurshab and Jazy.
