= Dzhangi =

Dzhangi may refer to:

- Vardablur, Aragatsotn, Armenia, formerly Dzhangi
- Cəngi, Azerbaijan
- Dzhangi-Dzhol, Kyrgyzstan
