= Kurshab =

Kurshab Куршаб
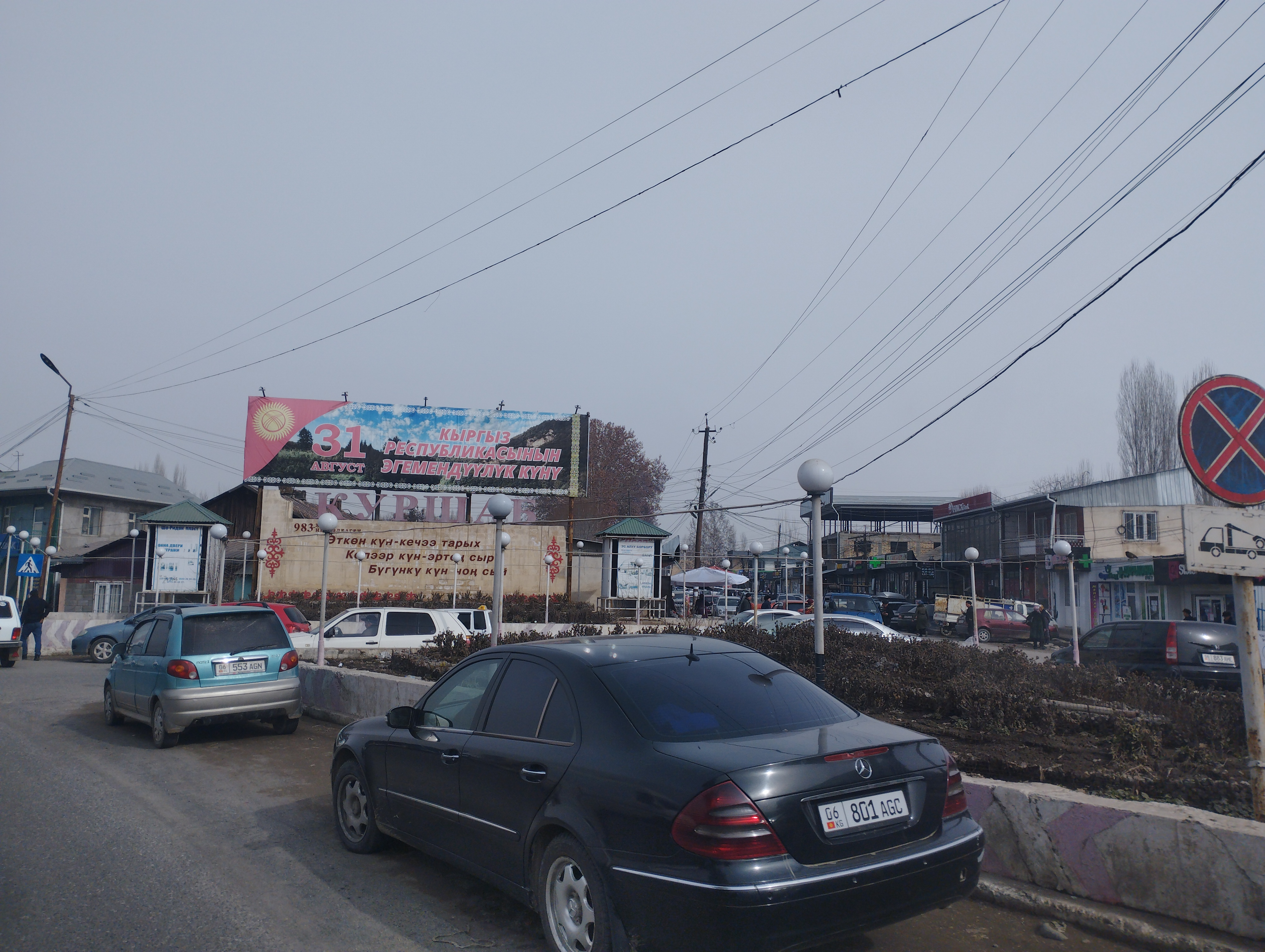

- Location within Kyrgyzstan
- Coordinates: 40°41′30″N 73°11′20″E
- Country: Kyrgyzstan
- Region: Osh
- District: Özgön
- Pokrovskoye: 1893

Population (2021)
  - Total: 20,471
- Time zone: UTC+6

Kurshab (established as Pokrovskoye, before 2004: Leninskoye) is a large village in Osh Region of Kyrgyzstan. It is part of the Özgön District. Its population was 20,471 in 2021. It is situated near the river Kurshab, between the cities Osh and Özgön.

The settlement was established as Pokrovskoye by settlers from majorly Kiev Governorate of Russian Empire in 1893. By 1900s Pokrovskoye amounted to 186 households.

== Population ==
Historical population
Year	Pop.	±% p.a.
2009	16,364	—
2021	20,471	+1.88%
Note: resident population; Sources:
