= Kyzyl-Bayrak =

Kyzyl-Bayrak may refer to the following places in Kyrgyzstan:

- Kyzyl-Bayrak, Chuy, village in Kemin District, Chuy Region
- Kyzyl-Bayrak, Kara-Suu, village in Kara-Suu District, Osh Region
- Kyzyl-Bayrak, Özgön, Özgön District, Osh Region
