= Dzhetyasar culture =

Central Asian archaeological culture

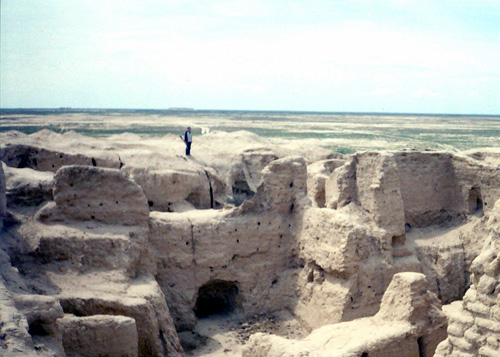
- Geographical range: Southwestern Kazakhstan
- Period: Iron Age
- Dates: c. 200 BC – 800
- Preceded by: Chirik-Rabat culture
- Followed by: Swamp fort culture Kerder culture

Dzhetyasar culture (Jeti-Asar, Zhetiasar, from kaz. Seven (a lot of) fortresses) is a group of settlements (possibly up to 100) belonging from the end of the 1st millennium BC - 8th century AD. These settlements are located in the northern part of the ancient Syrdarya and Kuandarya deltas, north of the so-called Protokuvandari (the system of dry river beds called Eskidaryalyk, Old Syrdaryas). The majority of the settlements are located between 45 – 90 km south of the modern city of Baikonur and the village of Dzhusaly in the Kyzylorda region of Kazakhstan. An important caravan route from the Tien Shan Mountains to Itil in the Volga estuary passed through the Dzhetyasar settlement area.

The most significant forts are Altynasar (17 hectares), Kuraylyasar, Karaasar, Bazarasar, Tompakasar and Zhalpakasar. The tells (mounds of settlement debris) rise two to ten meters above the surrounding plain.

All settlements of the Dzhetyasar culture are located at the ancient river course, and they are well fortified, with one or more two- to three-storey towers each – apparently like community buildings. The economy was based on animal husbandry, irrigation farming, and fishing.

Archaeologists associate the Dzhetyasar culture with the culture of the ancient Tocharians and Hephthalites, or with the culture of the Kangar tribes.

Dzhetyasar sites were first excavated in 1946-51 by the Khorezmian Archaeological and Ethnographic Expedition of the Academy of Sciences of the USSR (known for short as the Chorasmian Expedition) under the leadership of S.P. Tolstov. In 1973-1993 excavations resumed under the leadership of L.M. Levina. The most significant rescue excavations of the Altynasar settlement and surrounding cemeteries were done in the second half of 1980s and the early 1990s because of water pipeline construction to bring artesian water from the Kyzylkum desert to Baikonur.

== Literature ==
- Tolstov S.P., The ancient deltas of Oxsus and Jaxartes, Moscow, 1962 (In Russian)
- Tolstov S.P., Following ancient Horesm civilization, Part 2. Ch. 6 http://www.opentextnn.ru/history/archaeology/expedetion/Tolstov/?id=1635 (In Russian)
- S. P. Tolstov - Il Paese degli antichi canali . Milano, 1961.
- S.P. Tolstov - Les Scythes de l' Aral et le Khorezm . Leiden, Brill, 1961.
- Levina L.M., Dzhetyasar culture, Parts 3-4. Altynasar necropolises 4 / Lower Syrdarya in antiquity, Vol. 4, Moscow, IEA RAN, 1994, ISBN 978-5-201-00815-4 http://www.iea.ras.ru/books/nizovyasirdari1994.zip (In Russian)
- Levina L.M., Ethno-cultural history of Eastern Aral Sea region. 1st millennium BCE - 1st millennium CE // Moscow, 1996, ISBN 978-5-02-017901-1 https://web.archive.org/web/20090131121316/http://kronk.narod.ru/library/levina-lm-1996.htm (Table of contents, Introduction, In Russian)
- Akishev K.A., Baipakov K.M., Problems of Kazakhstan archaeology, Alma-Ata, 1979 (In Russian)
