= Chorasmian Expedition =

The Chorasmian Archaeological-Ethnographic Expedition of the Academy of Sciences of the USSR (also known as Choresmian Expedition, Khorezmian Expedition) explored a large area of Central Asia, where between 1937 and 1991 its members found and recorded almost a thousand archaeological sites. It was the biggest and longest-lasting of all archaeological expeditions of the Soviet Union.

== History of the Chorasmian Expedition (1937–1991) ==
The expedition was founded in 1937 by Sergey Tolstov, initially with the intention of doing ethnographic studies in Central Asia. Tolstov switched to archaeology when his initial work in the Kyzylkum and Karakum deserts revealed extensive ruins and finds. He spent the rest of his life exploring the archaeology of Chorasmia (Khorezm, Khwarazm), the region southeast of the Aral Sea and between the rivers Amu-Darya and Syr-Darya which today is part of the post-Soviet republics of Uzbekistan, Turkmenistan and Kazakhstan.

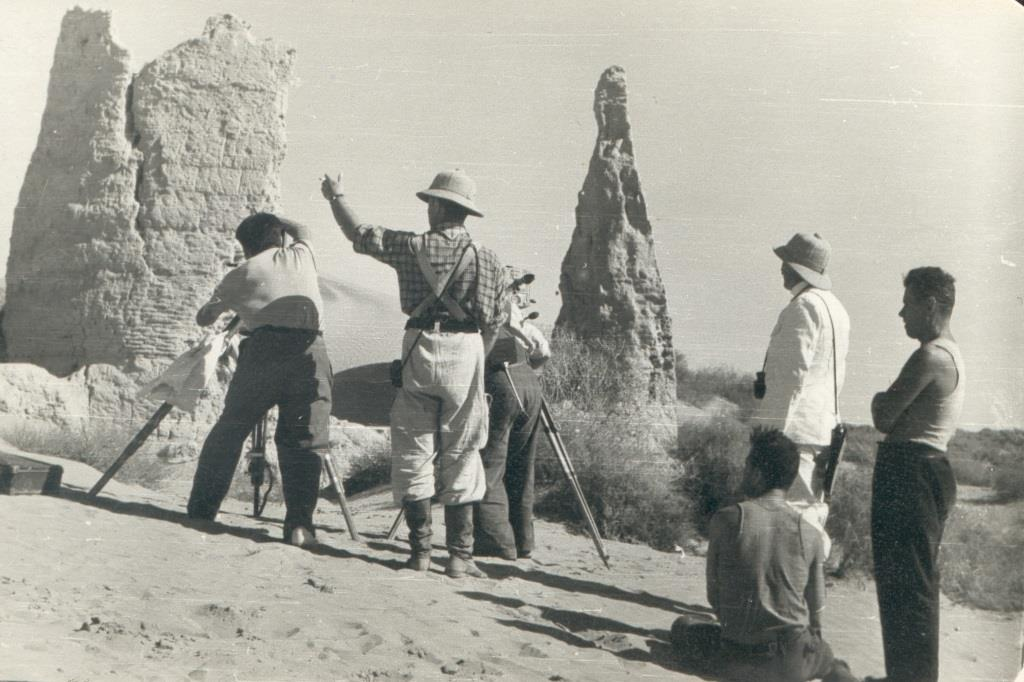
Chorasmian Expedition surveying an archaeological monument in Khwarazm, Central Asia, 1950

For his expedition, he collected a team made up mainly of current and former students of the Archaeology Department at Moscow State University (MGU) where Tolstov himself had graduated. These included A.I. Terenozhkin (specialized in the Saka-Scythian period), M.A. Orlov (an architect) and Ya.G. Gulyamov (a local archaeologist from Tashkent) before the Second World War. After that conflict, he recruited N.N. Vakturskaya (a pottery specialist), Yu.A. Rappoport (a specialist on cult and religion), O.A. Vishnevskaya, M.A. Itina (specializing in the Bronze Age and Iron Ages), E.E. Nerasik (an early medieval settlement specialist), L.M. Levina, B.I. Vajnberg (a numismatist), A.V. Vinogradov (a Palaeolithic specialist), and B.A. Andrianov (a specialist on ancient irrigation, and a pioneer in the use of aerial photography).

Tolstov remained the director of the Chorasmian Expedition until his death in December 1976; he was succeeded by Vinogradov and Itina. The expedition was based at the Academy of Sciences of the USSR where Tolstov worked, and where he was also director of the Institute of Ethnography and Anthropology (later renamed Institute of Ethnology and Anthropology) in 1942–1965.

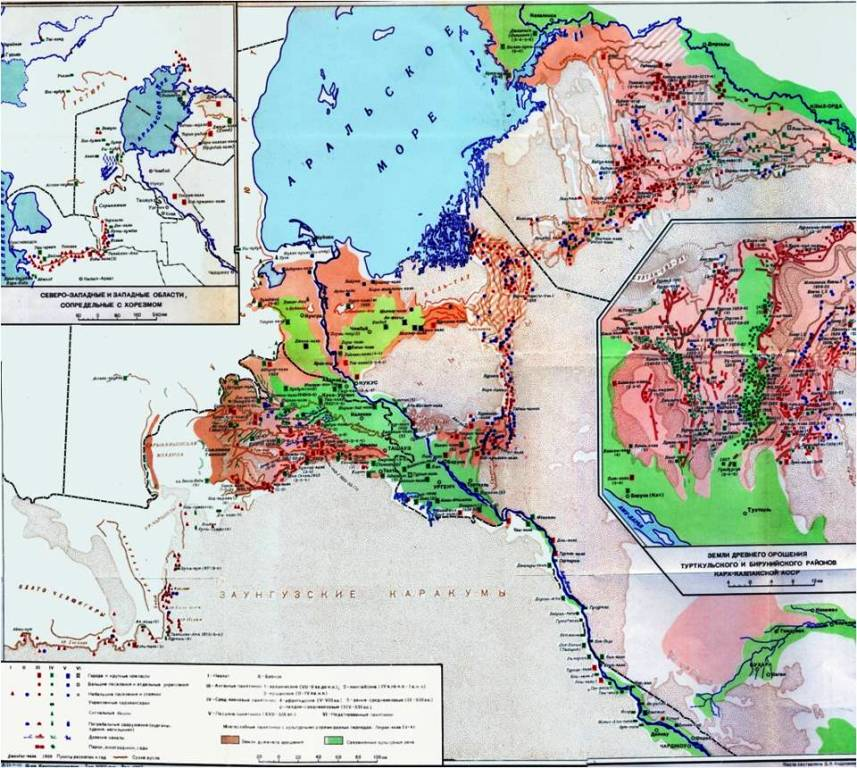
Map of fieldwork activities of the Chorasmian Expedition (up to 1962)

Before the Second World War, the main activities of the expedition consisted of preliminary survey work and small-scale excavations. After the war, work progressed to surveys of extensive areas of Chorasmia, and large-scale excavations of key sites in the region. The latter included the famous site of Toprak-kala (a palace of the 2nd/3rd century AD, with wall paintings, archive etc.); Dzhanbas-kala (a Neolithic settlement and Achaemenid fortress); Koi Krylgan Kala (a circular fortress, dated 4th century BC – 4th century AD); several sites of the Dzhetyasar culture (1st millennium AD); and the medieval town of Kunya-Urgench (10–14th centuries AD). While settlements made up the bulk of the sites which were explored in detail, the expedition also excavated many cemeteries and mausolea, including the rich and important cemeteries of Tagisken and Uigarak which belong to the Saka-Scythian period.

The Chorasmian Expedition pioneered multi-disciplinary work, using a wide range of methods and techniques. In addition to the standard archaeological methods of field survey and excavation, the expedition systematically used aerial photography, with at least two biplanes from 1946 onwards. This resulted in the biggest archive anywhere in Eurasia of aerial photographs taken specifically for archaeological purposes. The Chorasmian Expedition also included architects, physical anthropologists, soil scientists and topographers; the latter drew up a map of the ancient irrigation systems across the region.

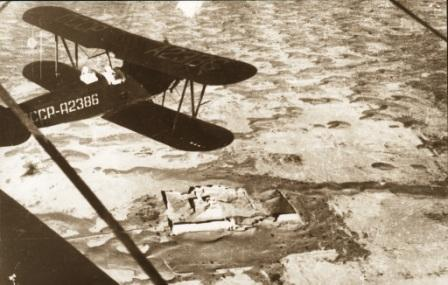
An aircraft of the Chorasmian Expedition in 1949 above the early medieval site of Adamli-kala (Uzbekistan)

Fieldwork was conducted every year (interrupted only during the years of the Soviet Union’s involvement in the Second World War), with up to eight or nine separate teams each year working on different sites or routes. The key result was the exploration of the archaeological remains of the Chorasmian civilization and its nomad neighbours. Earlier, this civilization had been known only from ancient written sources (Greek, Persian, Chinese), and from short reports by early explorers of the area. The Chorasmian Expedition had a huge impact on the discipline; it influenced several generations of Soviet archaeologists who worked on the expedition or were inspired by it; and it trained the first indigenous archaeologists from Central Asia. Its work ended with the disintegration of the Soviet Union, and the independence of the former Soviet republics of Uzbekistan, Turkmenistan and Kazakhstan.

== Background and political context ==
Tolstov was, and remained throughout his life, a Communist believer although he was aware of the political pitfalls of aspects of his work (particularly in ethnography). His Chorasmian Expedition enjoyed extremely generous support and research funding from the Soviet government and the authorities of constituent republics. This appears to have happened for two main reasons: the work of the Expedition suited the Soviet ‘imperial’ agenda in Central Asia; and its work tied in with the large-scale building projects and industrialization of the region. These projects (canals, irrigation networks, hydroelectric power stations and roads, and the partial diversion of the flow of Siberian rivers to Central Asia) necessitated previous archaeological work which was supported by a Soviet type of ‘developer funding’ legally required since 1934.

During Stalin’s anti-Semitic campaign in the late 1940s/early 1950s, the expedition became a safe haven for Jewish archaeologists and ethnographers. Tolstov offered them refuge in spite of his Communist beliefs and his privileged relationship with the Soviet leadership. Formozov has argued that Tolstov, by accepting the framework of Soviet ideology and rule for his work, achieved official acceptance for archaeology which, in turn, facilitated the establishment and development of the discipline as a whole in the USSR.

== The Expedition archive ==
The complete archive of the Chorasmian Expedition is located at Moscow, in the Institute of Ethnology and Anthropology (IEA) of the Russian Academy of Sciences (RAN). The archive consists of:

- Field diaries; some hand-written, others typed (approximately 15 metres (49 ft) of shelves).
- Topographic maps and plans, site plans, section drawings, and architectural drawings, including isometric drawings (several thousand items).
- Drawings of finds, copies of wall paintings and of frescoes of medieval mausolea (about 500 items).
- Prints and negatives of aerial photographs of archaeological sites (about 5,000 items).

From 2012 to 2015, the archive was digitized in an international project led by Zh. Kurmankulov (Almaty, Kazakhstan), I. Arzhantseva (Moscow) and H. Härke (Tübingen, Germany); this project was funded by the German Gerda Henkel Foundation. The outcome has been an extensive database and a website with scanned documents.
