= Staraya Pokrovka =

Staraya Pokrovka may refer to:

- Staraya Pokrovka, Osh, a village in Osh Region, Kyrgyzstan
- the former name of Chuy, Kyrgyzstan, a village in Chuy Region, Kyrgyzstan
