= Vardablur =

Vardablur or Vartablur or Verdablur may refer to:

- Vardablur, Aragatsotn, Armenia
- Vardablur, Lori, Armenia
