= Kulun Lake =

Lake in Kyrgyzstan

- Location within Kyrgyzstan Location within Asia
- Location: Osh Region
- Coordinates: 40°32′34″N 74°19′06″E
- Catchment area: 144 km^{2} (56 sq mi)
- Basin countries: Kyrgyzstan
- Max. length: 4.6 km (2.9 mi)
- Max. width: 0.7 km (0.43 mi)
- Surface area: 3.25 km^{2} (1.25 sq mi)
- Water volume: 118×10^{6} m^{3} (96,000 acre⋅ft)
- Surface elevation: 2,856 m (9,370 ft)

Kulun Lake (Kyrgyz: Кулун көлү) is a rock-dammed mountain lake on the southwestern slope of Fergana Range, located in Kara-Kulja District, Osh Region of Kyrgyzstan. It lies at the head of the Kulun River, a right tributary of the Tar River. The lake is 4.6 km (2.9 mi) long and 0.7 km (0.43 mi) wide. Its basin is situated at an elevation of 2,856 m (9,370 ft) above sea level. The water is clear and fresh. The lake was formed as a result of a landslide damming the Kulun Valley. The dam is 120 m (390 ft) high, 500 m (1,600 ft) wide, and 200 m (660 ft) long. The northern and southern slopes are steep (60°), surrounded by rugged cliffs. The surroundings are very picturesque: pine forests grow on the northern slopes of the surrounding mountains, while juniper forests cover the southern slopes.
