= List of rivers of Uzbekistan =

This is a list of rivers located in or flowing through Uzbekistan.

== Rivers ==
- Aksarsay River
- Amu Darya
- Angren River
- Chatkal River
- Chirchiq River
- Kara Darya
- Karatag River
- Naryn River
- Qashqadaryo River
- Sokh River
- Surxondaryo River
- Syr Darya
- Zeravshan River

== See also ==
- Geography of Uzbekistan#Topography and drainage
- Great Fergana Canal
