= Kyzyl-Too =

- Location within Kyrgyzstan
- Coordinates: 40°49′40″N 73°31′20″E
- Country: Kyrgyzstan
- Region: Osh
- District: Özgön

Population (2021)
  - Total: 4,690
- Time zone: UTC+6

Kyzyl-Too is a village in Osh Region of Kyrgyzstan. It is part of the Özgön District. Its population was 4,690 in 2021.
