= Tuz-Bel =

- Location within Kyrgyzstan
- Coordinates: 40°33′36″N 73°21′0″E
- Country: Kyrgyzstan
- Region: Osh
- District: Özgön
- Elevation: 1,959 m (6,427 ft)

Population (2021)
  - Total: 2,248
- Time zone: UTC+6

Tuz-Bel is a village in Osh Region of Kyrgyzstan. It is part of the Özgön District. Its population was 2,248 in 2021.
