= Üngkür =

Üngkür Үңкүр
- Location within Kyrgyzstan
- Coordinates: 40°30′36″N 73°16′48″E
- Country: Kyrgyzstan
- Region: Osh
- District: Özgön
- Elevation: 1,848 m (6,063 ft)

Population (2021)
  - Total: 681
- Time zone: UTC+6

Üngkür is a village in Osh Region of Kyrgyzstan. It is part of the Özgön District. Its population was 681 in 2021.
