= Kara Darya =

River in Kyrgyzstan and Uzbekistan

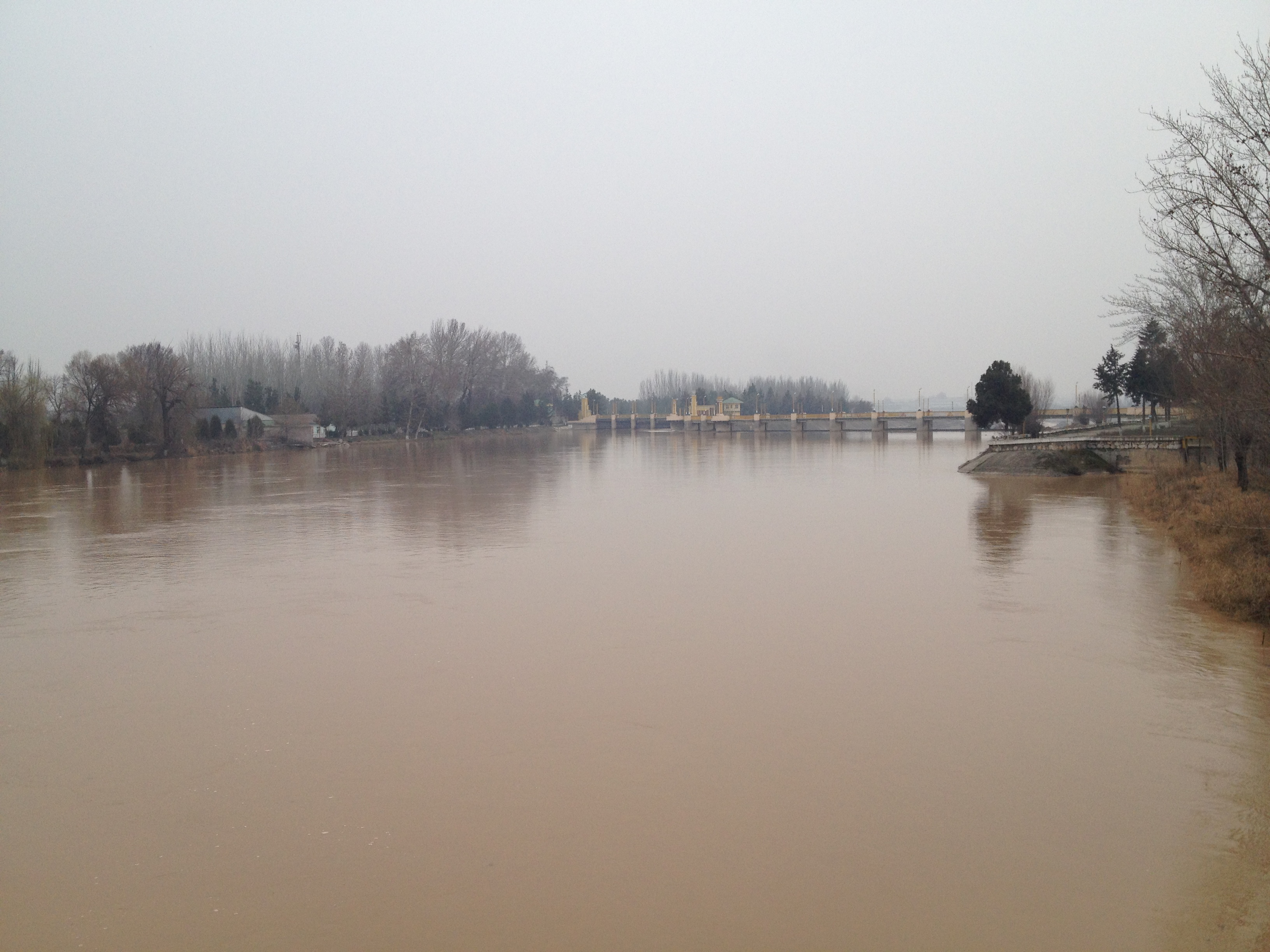
- Kara Darya near Andijan city
- Etymology: From Proto-Turkic kara 'black' and from Persian daryā 'river'
- Native name: Кара-Дарыя (Kyrgyz); Qoradaryo (Uzbek); Карадарья (Russian)

Location
- Country: Kyrgyzstan, Uzbekistan

Physical characteristics
- Source: Confluence of Tar and Kara-Kulja
  - location: Kara-Kulja District, Osh Region, Kyrgyzstan
  - coordinates: 40.6487°N 73.4228°E
- Mouth: Syr Darya
  - coordinates: 40.9°N 71.75°E
- Length: 177 km (110 mi)
- Basin size: 30,100 km^{2} (11,600 sq mi)
- Discharge
  - location: Uchtepa
  - average: 136 m^{3}/s (4,800 cu ft/s)
  - minimum: 68.4 m^{3}/s (2,420 cu ft/s)
  - maximum: 265 m^{3}/s (9,400 cu ft/s)

Basin features
- Progression: Syr Darya→ North Aral Sea
- Tributaries
  - left: Kurshab, Aravansay
  - right: Jazy, Kögart, Kara-Üngkür

The Kara Darya (Kyrgyz: Кара-Дарыя; Uzbek: Qoradaryo; lit. 'Black River') is a major river in southern Kyrgyzstan and eastern Uzbekistan located in the eastern part of Fergana Valley. It is one of the two source rivers of the Syr Darya (the second largest river of Central Asia), the other source being the Naryn. Its length is 177 kilometres (110 mi), and watershed area 30,100 square kilometres (11,600 mi^{2}). The Kara Darya is formed by the confluence of the rivers Kara-Kulja, which rises on the southwestern slopes of the Fergana Range, and Tar.

== Course ==
The river's upper course flows through narrow valleys, while the middle and lower courses pass through broad valleys. The upper Kara Darya flows northwest across eastern Osh Region southwest of and parallel to the Fergana Range. It enters the Fergana Valley and Uzbek territory a few kilometres west of Özgön.

== Hydrology ==
The basin contains about 40 lakes, including Chong Kulun, Kichi Kulun, Chong Köl, Kichi Köl, Kabylandköl, Karaköl, and Kutmanköl. Average annual discharge near Kempirabad (about 140 km upstream from the mouth) is 121 m^{3}/s (4,300 cu ft/s), with seasonal maxima of 676 m³/s and minima of 28.9 m³/s (February). The flow regime is sustained by approximately 32% snowmelt, 16% glacier meltwater, and 52% groundwater.

== Irrigation and infrastructure ==
In its lower course through the Fergana Valley the Kara Darya is extensively harnessed for irrigation. Major hydraulic works include a dam at Kuyganyor (north of Andijan) where part of its water is diverted into the Great Fergana Canal. The Andijan Dam, built in 1973, created the Andijan Reservoir. Numerous irrigation canals branch from the river and its tributaries, such as the Kochkorata, Otuzadyr, Uval, Altybay, and Naiman.

== Tributaries ==
Right-bank

Jazy, Kögart, Kara-Üngkür, Mailuu-Suu

Left-bank

Kurshab, Aravansay

In total, the Kara Darya has more than 200 tributaries.

== Settlements ==
Settlements along the river include the city of Uzgen and numerous villages on both the Kyrgyz and Uzbek banks.

== See also ==
- Syr Darya
- Naryn (river)
- Fergana Valley
- List of rivers of Kyrgyzstan
- List of rivers of Uzbekistan

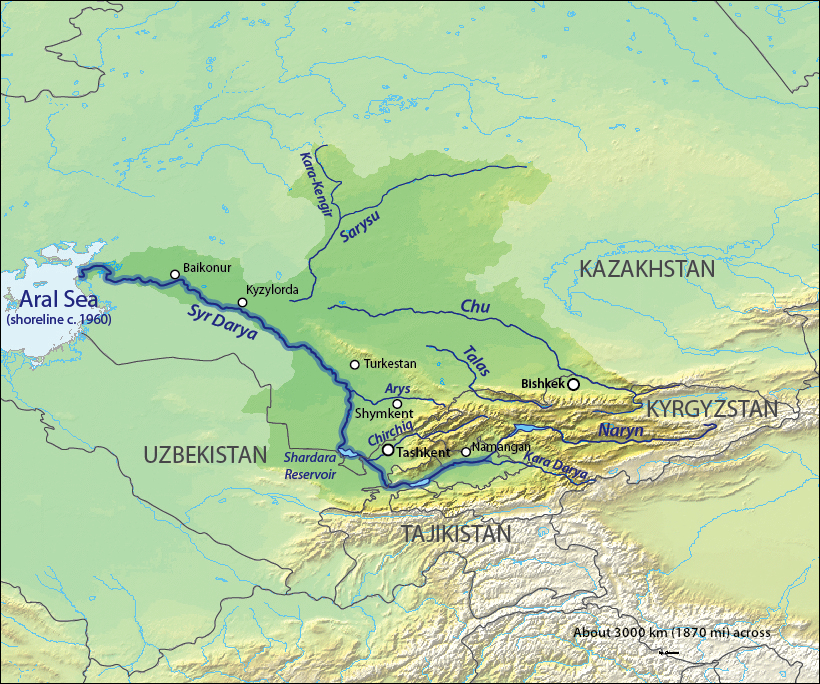
Map including Kara Darya
