= Jylandy =

Jylandy Жыланды
- Location within Kyrgyzstan
- Coordinates: 40°49′30″N 73°18′50″E
- Country: Kyrgyzstan
- Region: Osh
- District: Özgön
- Elevation: 945 m (3,100 ft)

Population (2021)
  - Total: 4,548
- Time zone: UTC+6

Jylandy is a village in Osh Region of Kyrgyzstan. It is part of the Özgön District. Its population was 4,548 in 2021.
