= Kyzyl-Senggir =

Kyzyl-Senggir Кызыл-Сеңгир
- Location within Kyrgyzstan
- Coordinates: 40°38′30″N 73°8′20″E
- Country: Kyrgyzstan
- Region: Osh
- District: Özgön
- Elevation: 957 m (3,140 ft)

Population (2021)
  - Total: 5,077
- Time zone: UTC+6

Kyzyl-Senggir (Kyrgyz: Кызыл-Сеңгир) is a village in Osh Region of Kyrgyzstan. It is part of the Özgön District. Its population was 5,077 in 2021.

== Population ==
Historical population
Year	Pop.	±% p.a.
2009	3,782	—
2021	5,077	+2.48%
Note: resident population; Sources:
