= Sasyk-Bulak =

Sasyk-Bulak Сасык-Булак
- Etymology: Kyrgyz: Сасык-Булак ("stinky spring")
- Location within Kyrgyzstan
- Coordinates: 40°42′30″N 73°36′50″E
- Country: Kyrgyzstan
- Region: Osh
- District: Özgön

Population (2021)
  - Total: 565
- Time zone: UTC+6

Sasyk-Bulak is a village in the Osh Region of Kyrgyzstan. It is part of the Özgön District. Its population was 565 in 2021.
