= Ara-Köl, Osh =

Ara-Köl Ара-Көл
- Location within Kyrgyzstan
- Coordinates: 40°53′10″N 73°46′10″E
- Country: Kyrgyzstan
- Region: Osh
- District: Özgön

Population (2021)
  - Total: 1,044
- Time zone: UTC+6

Ara-Köl is a village in Osh Region of Kyrgyzstan. It is part of the Özgön District. Its population was 1,044 in 2021.
