= Donguz-Too =

Donguz-Too Доңуз-Тоо
- Location within Kyrgyzstan
- Coordinates: 40°51′50″N 73°33′30″E
- Country: Kyrgyzstan
- Region: Osh
- District: Özgön
- Elevation: 1,172 m (3,845 ft)

Population (2021)
  - Total: 570
- Time zone: UTC+6

Donguz-Too (Kyrgyz: Доңуз-Тоо) is a village in Osh Region of Kyrgyzstan. It is part of the Özgön District. Its population was 570 in 2021.
