= Kara-Dyykan =

Kara-Dyykan Кара-Дыйкан
- Location within Kyrgyzstan
- Coordinates: 40°47′20″N 73°22′0″E
- Country: Kyrgyzstan
- Region: Osh
- District: Özgön
- Elevation: 1,031 m (3,383 ft)

Population (2021)
  - Total: 7,492
- Time zone: UTC+6

Kara-Dyykan (before 2004: Ilyichevka)) is a village in Osh Region of Kyrgyzstan. It is part of the Özgön District. Its population was 7,492 in 2021.

== Population ==
Historical population
Year	Pop.	±% p.a.
2009	5,892	—
2021	7,492	+2.02%
Note: resident population; Sources:
