= Chalk-Öydö =

Chalk-Öydö Чалк-Өйдө
- Location within Kyrgyzstan
- Coordinates: 40°43′48″N 73°39′0″E
- Country: Kyrgyzstan
- Region: Osh
- District: Özgön
- Elevation: 1,820 m (5,970 ft)

Population (2021)
  - Total: 1,445
- Time zone: UTC+6

Chalk-Öydö is a village in the Osh Region of Kyrgyzstan. It is part of the Özgön District. Its population was 1,445 in 2021.
