= Kuturgan =

- Location within Kyrgyzstan
- Coordinates: 40°55′0″N 73°30′20″E
- Country: Kyrgyzstan
- Region: Osh
- District: Özgön
- Elevation: 1,535 m (5,036 ft)

Population (2021)
  - Total: 1,856
- Time zone: UTC+6

Kuturgan is a village in Osh Region of Kyrgyzstan. It is part of the Özgön District. Its population was 1,856 in 2021.
