= Ak-Jar, Özgön =

Ak-Jar
- Location within Kyrgyzstan
- Coordinates: 40°48′0″N 73°27′0″E
- Country: Kyrgyzstan
- Region: Osh
- District: Özgön
- Elevation: 1,271 m (4,170 ft)

Population (2021)
  - Total: 2,221
- Time zone: UTC+6

Ak-Jar is a village in Osh Region of Kyrgyzstan. It is part of the Özgön District. Its population was 2,221 in 2021.
