= Zerger =

Zerger Зергер
- Location within Kyrgyzstan
- Coordinates: 40°53′50″N 73°28′40″E
- Country: Kyrgyzstan
- Region: Osh
- District: Özgön
- Elevation: 1,250 m (4,100 ft)

Population (2021)
  - Total: 1,030
- Time zone: UTC+6

Zerger (Kyrgyz: Зергер, also Заргер Zarger) is a village in Osh Region of Kyrgyzstan. It is part of the Özgön District. Its population was 1,030 in 2021.
