= Shoro-Bashat =

Shoro-Bashat Шоро-Башат
- Location within Kyrgyzstan
- Coordinates: 40°50′30″N 73°16′10″E
- Country: Kyrgyzstan
- Region: Osh
- District: Özgön

Population (2021)
  - Total: 5,808
- Time zone: UTC+6

Shoro-Bashat (Kyrgyz: Шоро-Башат) is a village in Osh Region of Kyrgyzstan. It is part of the Özgön District. Its population was 5,808 in 2021.

== Population ==
Historical population
Year	Pop.	±% p.a.
2009	4,764	—
2021	5,808	+1.66%
Note: resident population; Sources:
