= Koi Krylgan Kala =

Archaeological site in Uzbekistan

- Koi Krylgan Kala
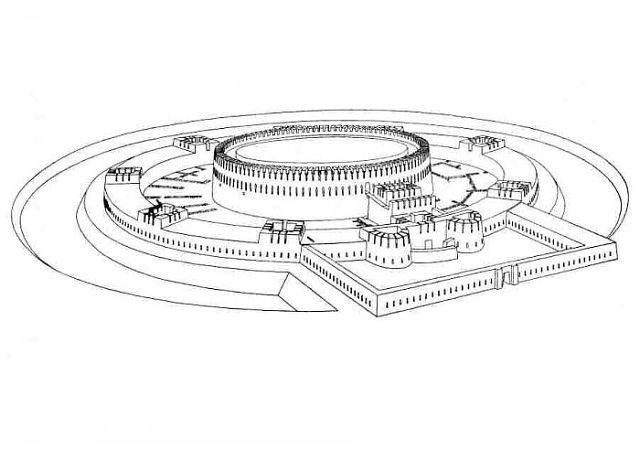
- Koi Krylgan Kala (reconstruction)

- Location within West and Central Asia Location within Uzbekistan Location within Karakalpakstan
- 41°45′18.77″N 61°7′1.22″E
- Type: Settlement
- Periods: Parthian, Sasanian
- Location: Karakalpakstan, Uzbekistan

Site notes
- Excavation dates: 1938
- Condition: Ruined

Koi Krylgan Kala (Uzbek: Qoʻyqirilgan qalʼa; Russian: Кой-Крылган-Кала) is an archaeological site located outside the village of Taza-Kel'timinar in the Ellikqal'a District (Uzbek: Ellikqalʼa tumani; Russian: Элликкалинский район) in the Republic of Karakalpakstan, an autonomous republic of Uzbekistan. In ancient times, it was sited along a canal in the Oxus delta region.

There is some relationship between Koi Krylgan Kala and Toprak-Kala, 30 km to the northwest. It is a temple complex of the Chorasmian Dynasty, an Iranian people who ruled the area of Khwarezm. It was built in the 4th-3rd century BCE. The Apa-Saka tribe destroyed it c. 200 BCE, but later it was rebuilt into a settlement, which lasted until c. 400 CE. It was discovered in 1938 by Sergey Pavlovitch Tolstov, leader of the Chorasmian Archaeological-Ethnological Expedition. It contained a Mazdian fire temple and was decorated with frescoes of wine consumption.

The explorer Sergey Tolstov drew a reconstruction of the ancient fortress.

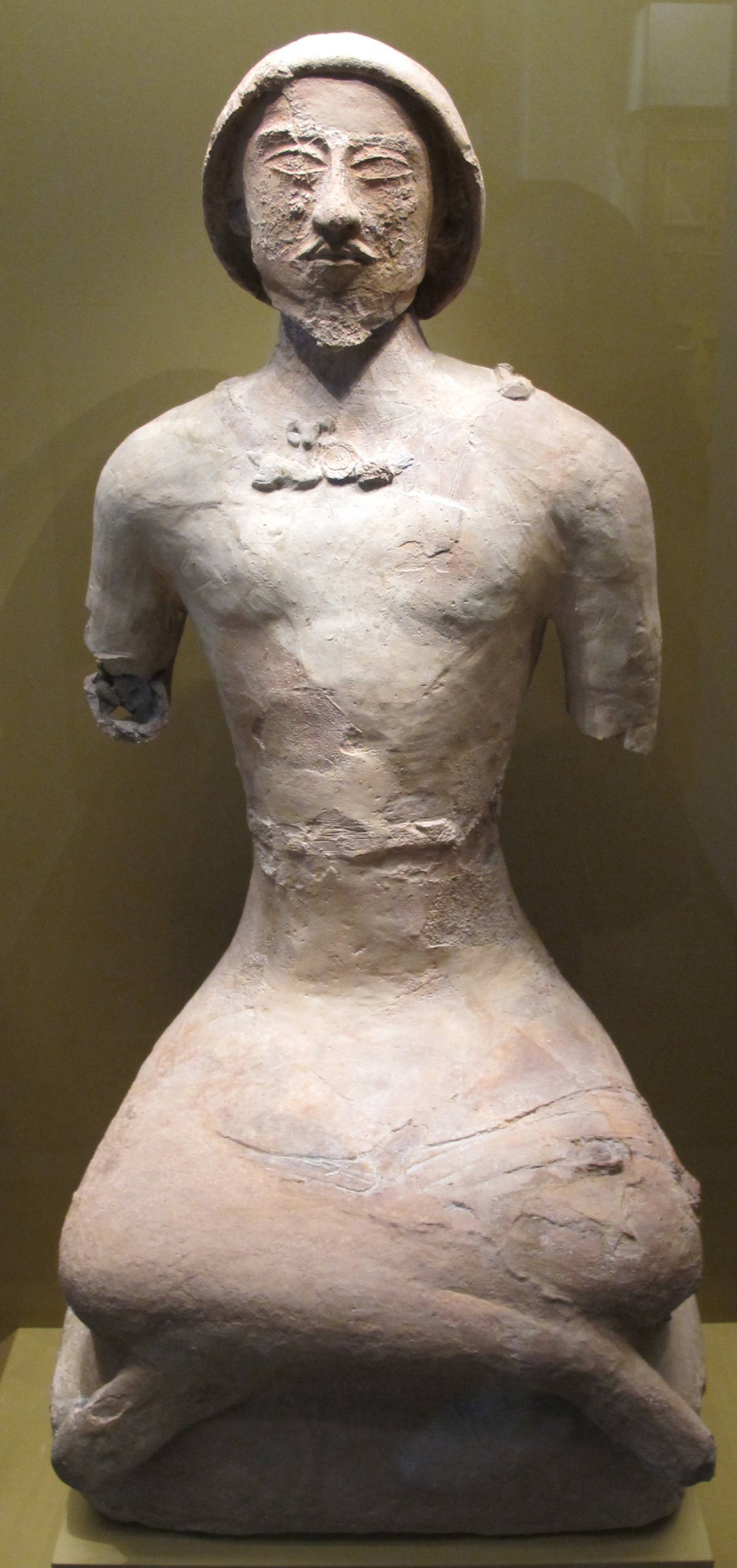
Statue of a man-ossuary from Koi Krylgan Kala, first centuries A.D., Hermitage Museum

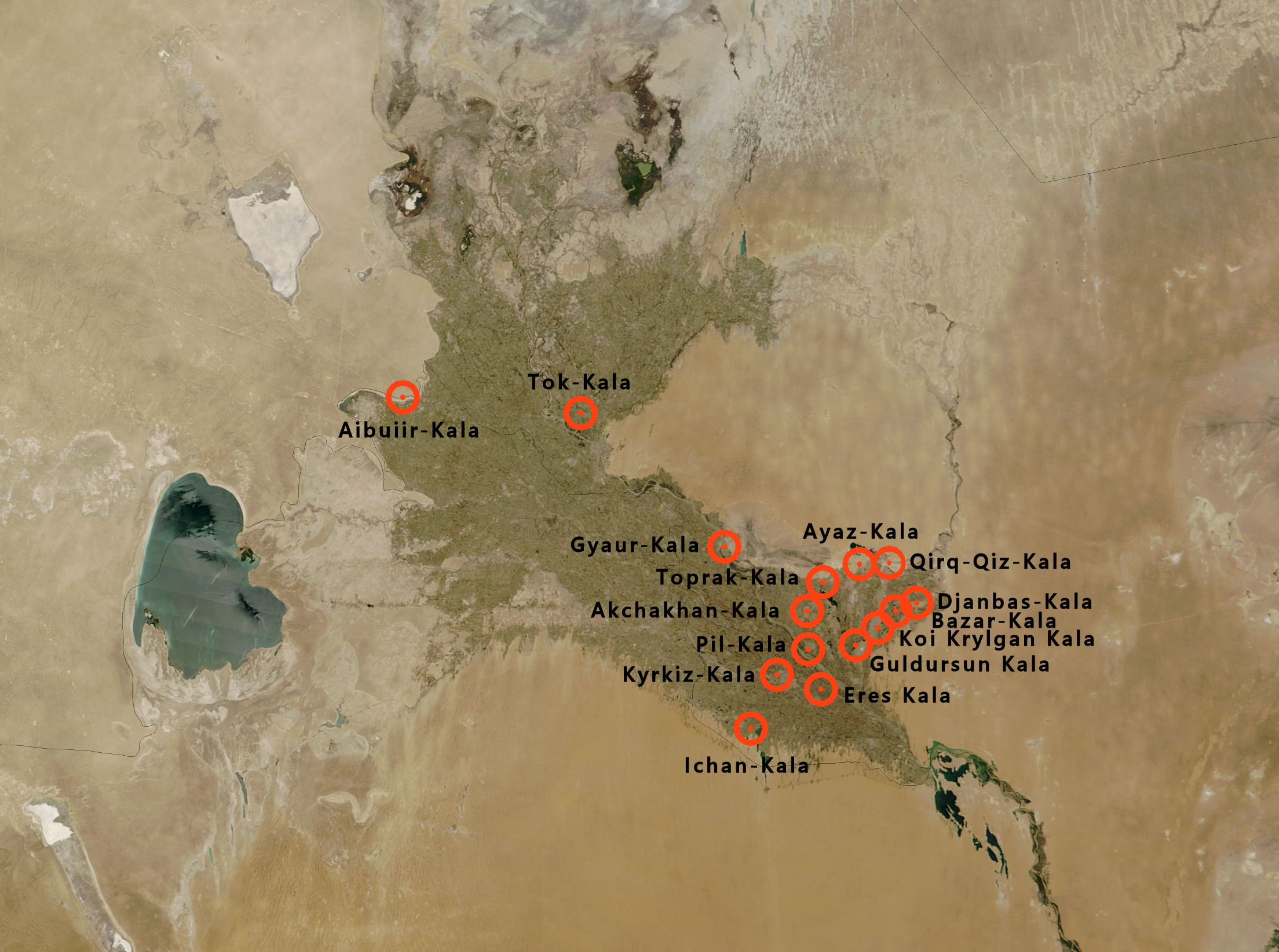
Location of the Koi Krylgan Kala fortress in the Chorasmian oasis, in relation to other main fortresses
