= Josholu =

Location
- Country: Kyrgyzstan

Physical characteristics
- Mouth: Kurshab
  - coordinates: 40.3172°N 73.4211°E
- Length: 40 km (25 mi)
- Basin size: 285 km^{2} (110 sq mi)

Basin features
- Progression: Kurshab→ Kara Darya→ Syr Darya→ North Aral Sea

The Josholu (Kyrgyz: Жошолу) is a river in Alay District, Osh Region, Kyrgyzstan. It is a right tributary of the Kurshab, which it joins near Gulcha. It is 40 kilometres (25 mi) long, and has a drainage basin of 285 square kilometres (110 sq mi).
