= Oogon-Talaa =

Oogon-Talaa Оогон-Талаа
- Location within Kyrgyzstan
- Coordinates: 41°15′50″N 73°01′20″E
- Country: Kyrgyzstan
- Region: Jalal-Abad
- District: Bazar-Korgon
- Elevation: 1,204 m (3,950 ft)

Population (2021)
  - Total: 3,274
- Time zone: UTC+6

Oogon-Talaa (Kyrgyz: Оогон-Талаа) is a village in Jalal-Abad Region of Kyrgyzstan. It is part of the Bazar-Korgon District. Its population was 3,274 in 2021. It lies on the river Kara-Üngkür.
