= 15 Jash =

- Location within Kyrgyzstan
- Coordinates: 40°52′48″N 73°48′0″E
- Country: Kyrgyzstan
- Region: Osh
- District: Özgön
- Elevation: 1,596 m (5,236 ft)

Population (2021)
  - Total: 685
- Time zone: UTC+6

15 Jash (Kyrgyz: 15 Жаш, meaning "15 Years", before 2004: им.15-летия Октября im. 15-letiya Oktyabrya) is a village in Osh Region of Kyrgyzstan. It is part of the Özgön District. Its population was 685 in 2021.
