= Kandava, Kyrgyzstan =

Kandava Кандава
- Location within Kyrgyzstan
- Coordinates: 40°42′10″N 73°32′10″E
- Country: Kyrgyzstan
- Region: Osh
- District: Özgön
- Elevation: 1,344 m (4,409 ft)

Population (2021)
  - Total: 861
- Time zone: UTC+6

Kandava is a village in Osh Region of Kyrgyzstan. It is part of the Özgön District. Its population was 861 in 2021.
