= Sheraly =

Sheraly Шералы
- Location within Kyrgyzstan
- Coordinates: 40°45′10″N 73°16′50″E
- Country: Kyrgyzstan
- Region: Osh
- District: Özgön

Population (2021)
  - Total: 5,200
- Time zone: UTC+6

Sheraly (Kyrgyz: Шералы) is a village in Osh Region of Kyrgyzstan. It is part of the Özgön District. Its population was 5,200 in 2021.

== Population ==
Historical population
Year	Pop.	±% p.a.
2009	4,357	—
2021	5,200	+1.48%
Note: resident population; Sources:
