= Guzar =

Guzar Гузар
- Location within Kyrgyzstan
- Coordinates: 40°40′10″N 73°9′40″E
- Country: Kyrgyzstan
- Region: Osh
- District: Özgön

Population (2021)
  - Total: 1,030
- Time zone: UTC+6

Guzar is a village in Osh Region of Kyrgyzstan. It is part of the Özgön District. Its population was 1,030 in 2021.
