= Kosh-Eter =

Kosh-Eter Кош-Этер
- Location within Kyrgyzstan
- Coordinates: 40°52′50″N 73°42′40″E
- Country: Kyrgyzstan
- Region: Osh
- District: Özgön

Population (2021)
  - Total: 1,074
- Time zone: UTC+6

Kosh-Eter is a village in Osh Region of Kyrgyzstan. It is part of the Özgön District. Its population was 1,074 in 2021.
