= Tar (Kyrgyzstan) =

- Native name: Тар (Kyrgyz)

Location
- Country: Kyrgyzstan
- Region: Osh Region
- District: Kara-Kulja District

Physical characteristics
- Source: Alay Range
  - coordinates: 40°20′41″N 74°54′24″E
  - elevation: 3,958 m (12,986 ft)
- Mouth: Kara Darya
  - coordinates: 40°38′43″N 73°25′29″E
- Length: 192 km (119 mi)
- Basin size: 4,420 km^{2} (1,710 sq mi)
- Discharge
  - average: 45.7 m³/s
  - minimum: 8.9 m³/s
  - maximum: 214 m³/s

Basin features
- Progression: Kara Darya→ Syr Darya→ North Aral Sea
- Tributaries
  - right: Terek, Kulun

The Tar (Kyrgyz: Тар Tar, in its upper course Alaykuu Kyrgyz: Алайкуу) is a river in the Kara-Kulja District of the Osh Region of Kyrgyzstan. It originates on the northern slopes of the Alay Range (Pamir-Alay) and on the southwestern slopes of the Fergana Range. At its confluence with the river Kara-Kulja, east of Uzgen, it forms the Kara Darya. The section of the Tar upstream from the mouth of the Terek river is known as Alaykuu.

The Tar is 192 kilometres (119 mi) long and drains a basin of 4,420 square kilometres (1,710 sq mi).

== Course ==
In its middle course, the river flows through small valleys and deep (1–2 km) narrow gorges; in the lower course, it flows through the Alaykuu Valley.

== Hydrology ==
The river’s average annual discharge is 45.7 m^{3}/s (1,610 cu ft/s), with peak flows of up to 214 m^{3}/s (7,600 cu ft/s) in June–July and a minimum discharge of about 8.9 m^{3}/s (310 cu ft/s) in January–February. It is fed mainly by snowmelt, glacial meltwater, and springs. The flow begins to rise in April and decreases in October. The Tar is an important source of irrigation water in the region.

== See also ==
- Osh Oblast Encyclopedia. Chief Editorial Board of Kyrgyz Soviet Encyclopedia. Frunze, 1987 (in Russian).
