= Myrza-Aryk =

Myrza-Aryk Мырза-Арык
- Location within Kyrgyzstan
- Coordinates: 40°43′30″N 73°13′30″E
- Country: Kyrgyzstan
- Region: Osh
- District: Özgön

Population (2021)
  - Total: 7,013
- Time zone: UTC+6

Myrza-Aryk (Kyrgyz: Мырза-Арык) is a village in Osh Region of Kyrgyzstan. It is part of the Özgön District. Its population was 7,013 in 2021.

== Population ==
Historical population
Year	Pop.	±% p.a.
2009	5,065	—
2021	7,013	+2.75%
Note: resident population; Sources:
