= Shamal-Terek =

Shamal-Terek Шамал-Терек
- Location within Kyrgyzstan
- Coordinates: 40°47′40″N 73°34′40″E
- Country: Kyrgyzstan
- Region: Osh
- District: Özgön
- Elevation: 1,462 m (4,797 ft)

Population (2021)
  - Total: 3,901
- Time zone: UTC+6

Shamal-Terek is a village in Osh Region of Kyrgyzstan. It is part of the Özgön District. Its population was 3,901 in 2021.
