= Jangy-Jol =

Jangy-Jol (or Dzhangi-Dzhol) may refer to the following places in Kyrgyzstan:

- Jangy-Jol, Chüy, a village in Chüy District, Chüy Region
- Jangy-Jol, Kemin, a village in Kemin District, Chüy Region
- Jangy-Jol, Aksy, a village in Aksy District, Jalal-Abad Region
- Jangy-Jol, Toktogul, a village in Toktogul District, Jalal-Abad Region
- Jangy-Jol, Naryn, a village in Kochkor District, Naryn Region
- Jangy-Jol, Aravan, a village in Aravan District, Osh Region
- Jangy-Jol, Özgön, a village in Özgön District, Osh Region
