= Erkin-Too =

Erkin-Too Эркин-Тоо
- Location within Kyrgyzstan
- Coordinates: 40°49′0″N 73°35′30″E
- Country: Kyrgyzstan
- Region: Osh
- District: Özgön

Population (2021)
  - Total: 2,389
- Time zone: UTC+6

Erkin-Too is a village in Osh Region of Kyrgyzstan. It is part of the Özgön District. Its population was 2,389 in 2021.
