= Andijan Reservoir =

Reservoir in Kyrgyzstan and Uzbekistan

Andijan / Kempir-Abad Reservoir
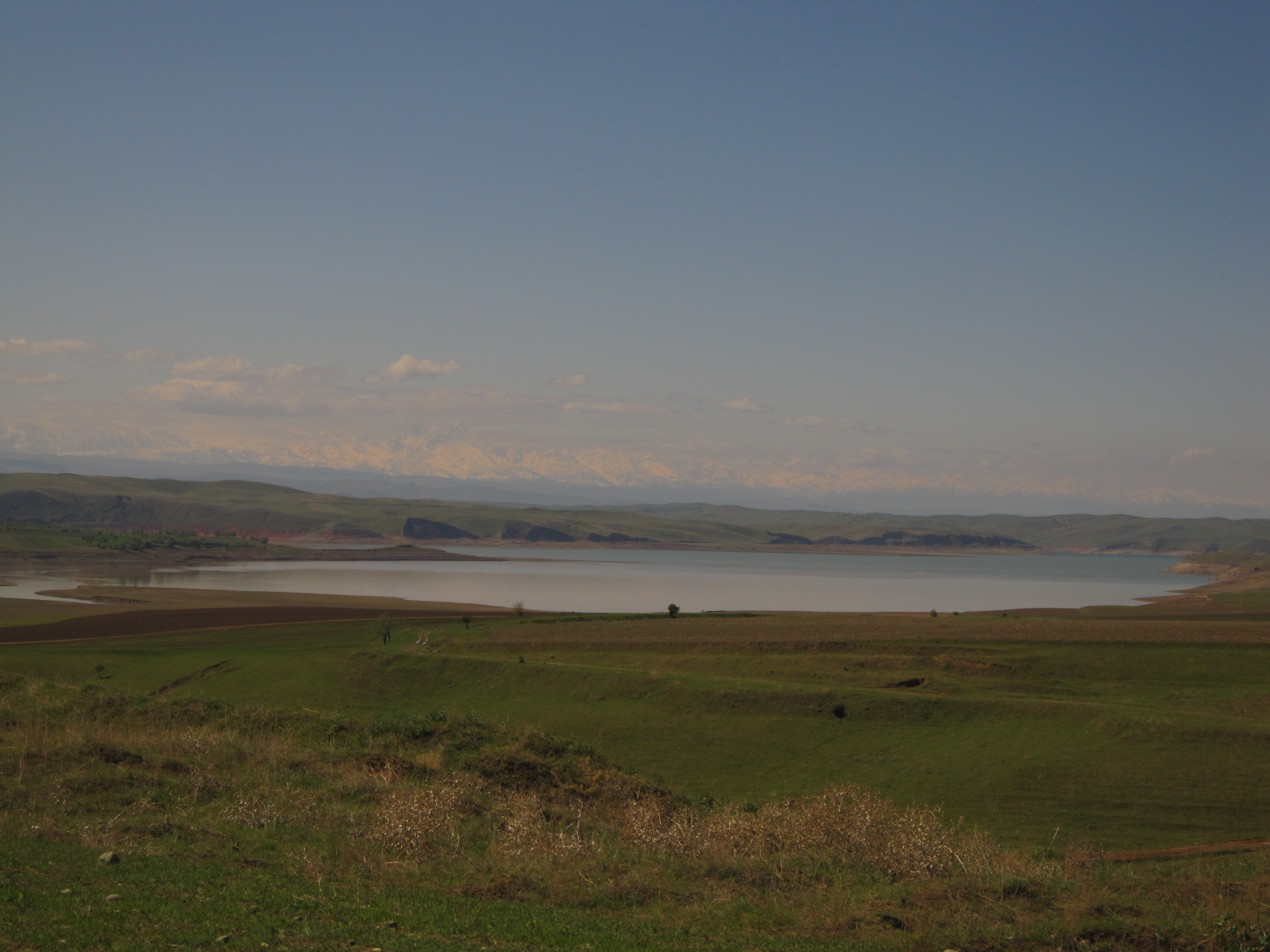

- Location within Kyrgyzstan
- Location: Andijan Region, Uzbekistan / Osh Region, Kyrgyzstan
- Coordinates: 40°46′29″N 73°07′19″E
- Primary inflows: Kara Darya River
- Primary outflows: Kara Darya River
- Built: 1969–1983
- First flooded: 1983
- Surface area: 56 km^{2} (22 sq mi)
- Max. depth: 98 m (322 ft)
- Water volume: 1,900×10^{6} m^{3} (1,500,000 acre⋅ft)

The Andijan Reservoir, known as the Kempir-Abad Reservoir in Kyrgyzstan (Uzbek: Andijon suv ombori; Kyrgyz: Кемпир-Абад суу сактагычы, romanized: Kempir-Abad suu saktagychy), is a reservoir formed by the Andijan Dam on the Kara Darya River in the Ferghana Valley. Following the dissolution of the USSR, the reservoir became a source of dispute between Kyrgyzstan and Uzbekistan, with each country claiming ownership. In 2022, the two countries signed a border demarcation deal, according to which Kyrgyzstan reportedly ceded control of the reservoir in exchange for agricultural land elsewhere in Uzbekistan. The agreement sparked protests in Kyrgyzstan, which were clamped down by the Kyrgyz government.

The Andijan reservoir has a maximum surface area of 56 square kilometres (22 sq mi), and an estimated volume of 1.9 cubic kilometres (0.46 cu mi).

== Name ==
The reservoir is known as Andijan Reservoir in Uzbekistan and as Kempir-Abad Reservoir in Kyrgyzstan. The predominant Kyrgyz spelling is an incorrect revision of the word "kampirravot" (Uzbek: Kampirravot; Kyrgyz: Кампыр-Рават; in some English sources spelled Kampyr-Ravatsk), which is the name of the gorge in which the reservoir is formed. On the Kara Darya, there also exists a village named Kampirravot, which is part of Xonobod City in Andijan Region of Uzbekistan.

Count K. K. Pahlen, who conducted an inspection tour of Central Asia on behalf of the Russian Tsar in 1908–1909, mentions in his memoirs a major dam on the Kara Darya River known as "Kampyr-Aravat." The dam was damaged during severe flooding in the spring of 1921. A dam called the Kampirravot Dam was built on the Kara Darya by the Uzbek SSR in 1937—1940.

== 2022 border deal ==
In October 2022, Kyrgyzstan and Uzbekistan reached a border demarcation deal. It was reported that as part of the deal Kyrgyzstan had relinquished its claim on the Andijan Reservoir in exchange for 19,000 hectares of agricultural land elsewhere in Uzbekistan. In November 2022, Kyrgyz President Sadyr Japarov and Uzbek President Shavkat Mirziyoyev signed the deal into law shortly after lawmakers in both countries approved it.

=== Kempir-Abad protests ===
While the details of the border deal were not fully disclosed, the agreement sparked protests across Kyrgyzstan. Prominent activists and politicians who supported and organized the protests were accused of plotting a coup. A total of 27 activists, journalists, and politicians who took part in or supported the protests were detained and prosecuted in high-profile cases. Women activists played a major role in the protests, including Rita Karasartova.

Human rights organizations stated the clampdown was politically motivated and called for releasing the protesters. They pointed out that prosecutors failed to produce evidence that the protesters incited mass riots or were planning to seize power. Kyrgyzstan's ombudswoman at the time, Adyr Abdrakhmatova, expressed concern that the protesters had been mistreated in custody.

== See also ==
- Kasan-Sai Reservoir
