= Salam-Alik =

Salam-Alik Салам-Алик
- Location within Kyrgyzstan
- Coordinates: 40°51′0″N 73°37′48″E
- Country: Kyrgyzstan
- Region: Osh
- District: Özgön
- Elevation: 1,288 m (4,226 ft)

Population (2021)
  - Total: 1,898
- Time zone: UTC+6

Salam-Alik (Kyrgyz: Салам-Алик) is a village in Osh Region of Kyrgyzstan. It is part of the Özgön District. Its population was 1,898 in 2021.
