= Jangy-Jol, Özgön =

Jangy-Jol Жаңы-Жол
- Location within Kyrgyzstan
- Coordinates: 40°46′20″N 73°13′20″E
- Country: Kyrgyzstan
- Region: Osh
- District: Özgön
- Elevation: 879 m (2,884 ft)

Population (2021)
  - Total: 257
- Time zone: UTC+6

Jangy-Jol is a village in Osh Region of Kyrgyzstan. It is part of the Özgön District. Its population was 257 in 2021.
