= Kara-Üngkür =

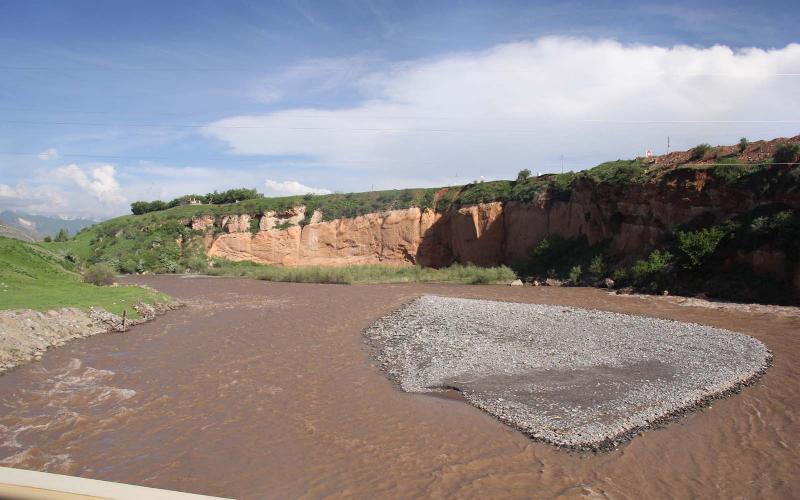

- Location within Kyrgyzstan
- Native name: Кара-Үңкүр (Kyrgyz); Tentaksoy (Uzbek)

Location
- Country: Kyrgyzstan, Uzbekistan

Physical characteristics
- Mouth
  - location: Kara Darya
  - coordinates: 40°52′35″N 72°19′39″E
- Length: 127 km (79 mi)
- Basin size: 4,130 km^{2} (1,590 sq mi)

Basin features
- Progression: Kara Darya→ Syr Darya→ North Aral Sea

The Kara-Üngkür (Kyrgyz: Кара-Үңкүр), in its lower course Tentaksoy (Uzbek: Tentaksoy, Kyrgyz: Тентек-Сай) is a river in Kyrgyzstan and Uzbekistan. It is a large right tributary of the Kara Darya. The river is formed at the confluence of the rivers Kyzyl-Üngkür and Arstanbap, which originate in the Fergana Range and Babash-Ata Range.

== Hydrology ==
The river's length is 127 km, and its basin size 4,130 km^{2}. Within its basin lie naturally scenic regions with wild walnut and fruit forests—the Kyzylünkür and Arstanbap valleys. At the village of Charbak, the average annual flow is 29.6 m³/s, with a maximum of 85.7 m³/s in May and a minimum of 9.64 m³/s in January. It discharges into the Kara Darya near the town of Kuyganyor, north of Andijan.

== Irrigation and Infrastructure ==
The Kara-Üngkür is used for irrigation. To fully utilize its water, the Bazarkorgon reservoir (capacity 22 million m³) was built in 1962.

== Settlements ==
The river flows along the villages Kyzyl-Üngkür, Oogon-Talaa, Charbak and Bazar-Korgon in Kyrgyzstan, and Paxtaobod in Uzbekistan.

== Tributaries ==
Main tributaries are Arstanbap, Shaydansay, Kyzylünkür, Jazkechüü, and others.
