= Kurshab (river) =

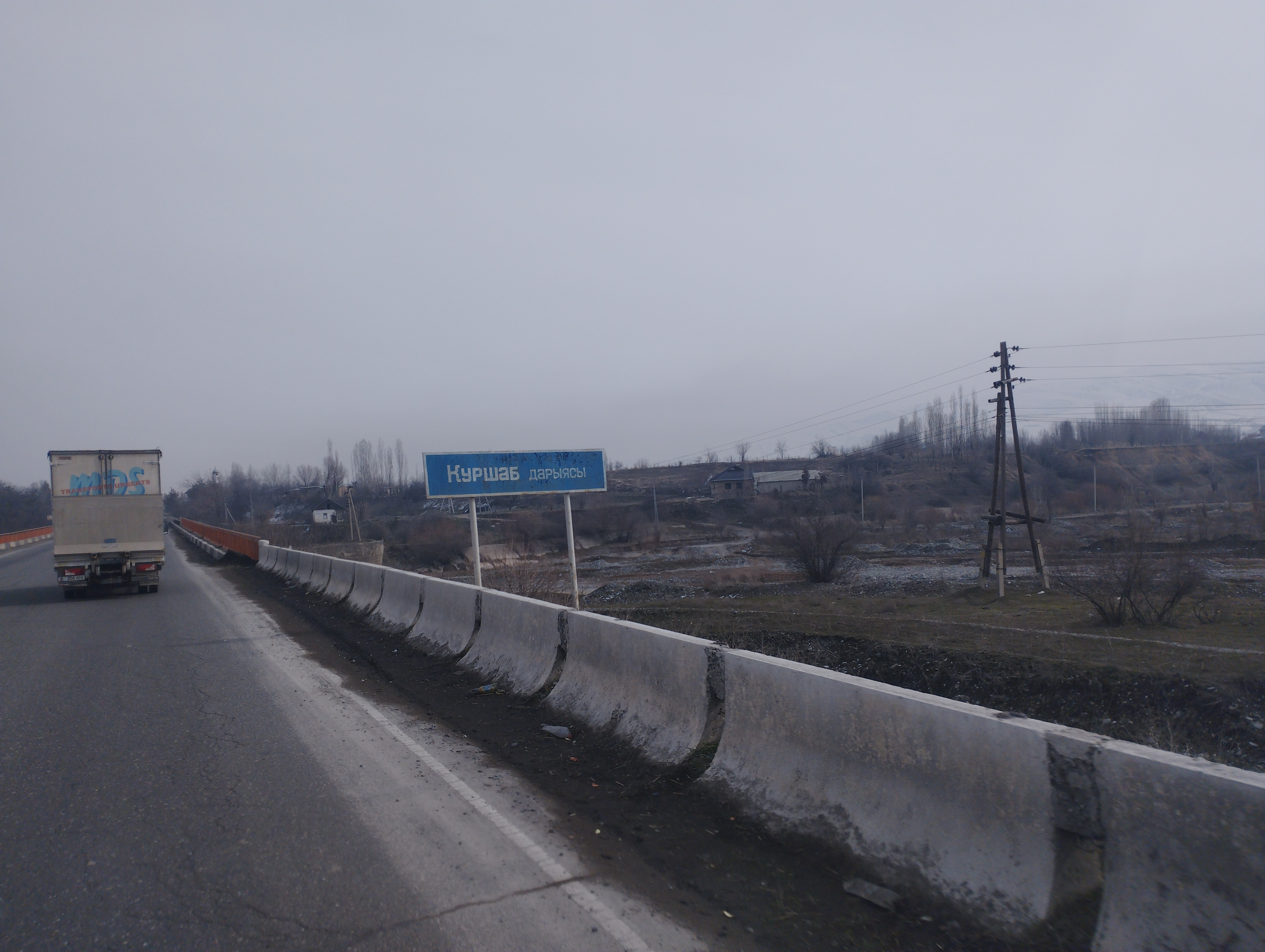
- Native name: Куршаб (Kyrgyz)

Location
- Country: Kyrgyzstan
- Region: Osh Region

Physical characteristics
- Mouth: Kara Darya
  - location: Andijan Reservoir
  - coordinates: 40°43′54″N 73°07′17″E
- Length: 157 km (98 mi)
- Basin size: 3,750 km^{2} (1,450 sq mi)
- Discharge
  - location: mouth
  - average: 24.6 m^{3}/s (870 cu ft/s)
  - minimum: 10.9 m^{3}/s (380 cu ft/s)
  - maximum: 58.6 m^{3}/s (2,070 cu ft/s)

Basin features
- Progression: Kara Darya→ Syr Darya→ North Aral Sea
- Tributaries
  - right: Josholu

The Kurshab (Kyrgyz: Куршаб [q͡χʊɾɕɑ́p]), in its upper course known as the Gülchö (Гүлчө [kʏlt͡ɕʰǿ]), is a river in southwestern Kyrgyzstan. It discharges into Andijan Reservoir, which is drained by the Kara Darya. The river is formed at the north slope of the Alay Mountains. The length of the river is 157 kilometres (98 mi) with a catchment area of 3,750 square kilometres (1,450 sq mi), and normal average discharge of 24.6 cubic metres per second (870 cu ft/s) at Kochkorata hydrologic post. The river is fed by a combination of snow (23%) and ice (11%) meltwater, and springs (66%). The maximum flow of 58.6 cubic metres per second (2,070 cu ft/s) was recorded in June and the minimum - 10.9 cubic metres per second (380 cu ft/s) in February. The river is used for irrigation. Several settlements are located near the river Kurshab, including Gülchö and Kurshab.
