= Kyzyl-Bayrak, Özgön =

Kyzyl-Bayrak Кызыл-Байрак
- Location within Kyrgyzstan
- Coordinates: 40°52′48″N 73°44′11″E
- Country: Kyrgyzstan
- Region: Osh
- District: Özgön

Population (2021)
  - Total: 1,008
- Time zone: UTC+6

Kyzyl-Bayrak is a village in Osh Region of Kyrgyzstan. It is part of the Özgön District. Its population was 1,008 in 2021.
