= 2024 Bishkek riots =

Xenophobic riots in Bishkek

- Location: Bishkek, Kyrgyzstan
- Date: May 17–18, 2024
- Target: Foreigners, especially ones from SWANA and South Asia
- Attack type: Mob violence
- Deaths: 4
- Injuries: At least 29
- Perpetrator: Kyrgyz nationalist mobs
- No. of participants: Over 100 (initially); 500–700
- Motive: Xenophobia

The 2024 Bishkek riots were attacks on foreigners by ethnic Kyrgyz mobs in Bishkek, the capital of Kyrgyzstan. The clashes lasted from May 17th to the 18th, with four reported deaths.

Foreign governments with citizens in the country took a deep concern, with the Pakistani government successfully evacuating 3000+ Pakistani students.

== Background ==
Kyrgyzstan is a common destination for medical students, given its cheap costs of education and internationally recognized medical degrees. It had more than 60,000 foreign students in 2021, including 14,500 Indian students and 10,000 Pakistani students.

== Trigger ==
The trigger of the clashes was a brawl between four or five young local citizens and Egyptian students in a dormitory on May 13th at about 02:00. Kyrgyzstani young men demanded cigarettes, which Egyptians refused. An existing video footage depicts Egyptian students attacking Kyrgyzstani men. The Kyrgyz police arrested three or four Egyptian citizens and placed them in the temporary detention center of the Central Internal Affairs Directorate in Bishkek over suspicion of hooliganism. After the original problem was resolved, the video was published on May 17th, spread across social media channels and the issue escalated. Later, it sparked retaliation by Kyrgyz mobs against foreigners in the country. Initially, over 100 Kyrgyz gathered "to take revenge on the foreigners who beat up residents."

== Main events ==
The Kyrgyz mobs began targeting anyone with a similar appearance to the Arabs they had fought. Pakistanis became the most targeted, and Indians and Bangladeshi were attacked too. The attacks were initially in universities, although they later spread to the streets, with Kyrgyz mobs attacking anyone perceived as foreign, whether they were male or female. Foreigners were instructed not to leave their homes and to close their curtains and to hide as the Kyrgyz mobs were severely beating people without any exceptions. The Kyrgyz mobs began going on a manhunt around the city for foreigners. 500–700 more Kyrgyz youth aged between 18 and 25 gathered in the city center.

After midnight, police recorded a video of the detained Egyptians, in which they apologized to the Kyrgyz people, expressed regret for what had happened, pledged that this will not happen again, and affirmed their determination to respect Kyrgyz law.

Four Pakistani students were reported killed, according to a news network from Srinagar, India. However, Pakistan and Kyrgyzstan both reported that no Pakistani students were killed.

On Kyrgyz social media, rioters sent messages calling on locals to come out and attack foreigners. Streets were extremely dangerous as hundreds of Kyrgyz rioters were mercilessly beating any foreigner they saw.

Mobs surrounded universities, workplaces, houses, and hostels where Pakistanis, Indians, and Bangladeshis were located, and dragged them out to beat. They also chanted racist slogans. Local streets were closed by authorities, although it did not have much effect.

By May 18, the violence had died down and the authorities declared the riot over. One-hundred-eighty Pakistanis, including 140 students, left Kyrgyzstan.

== Reactions and response ==
=== Egyptian government ===
On May 22nd, the Egyptian embassy in Kazakhstan stated that the issue of Egyptian students in Kyrgyzstan is solved. All detained students were released.

=== Pakistani government ===
The Pakistani government was commended for its quick response to ensure the safety of Pakistani students. The Kyrgyz government ensured provision of foolproof security to Pakistani students. Standard medical services were provided to the injured students. The government announced plans to operate special flights to bring back Pakistanis from Bishkek. A committee was also constituted to investigate the matter.

Deputy Prime Minister and Foreign Minister Muhammad Ishaq Dar announced that three special planes will bring back a total of 540 Pakistani students from Bishkek.

Pakistan Tehreek-e-Insaf, a major opposition party, Sindh’s region President Haleem Adil Sheikh criticized the government's response and said that the government did nothing but issue statements. Shaikh called for immediate start of emergency flight operations and opening of a Green Corridor to ensure safe return of Pakistani nationals.

Both the Indian and Pakistani embassies in Bishkek recommended that their nationals in Bishkek should stay indoors.

=== Kyrgyz government ===
On 22 May the Kyrgyz Ministry of Internal Affairs announced that ten people, six Kyrgyz nationals and four foreigners, had been detained in connection with the violent riots. According to the ministry, nine investigations were launched into hooliganism, robbery, mass disorder, and inciting ethnic hatred.
