= Aksarsoy =

River in Uzbekistan

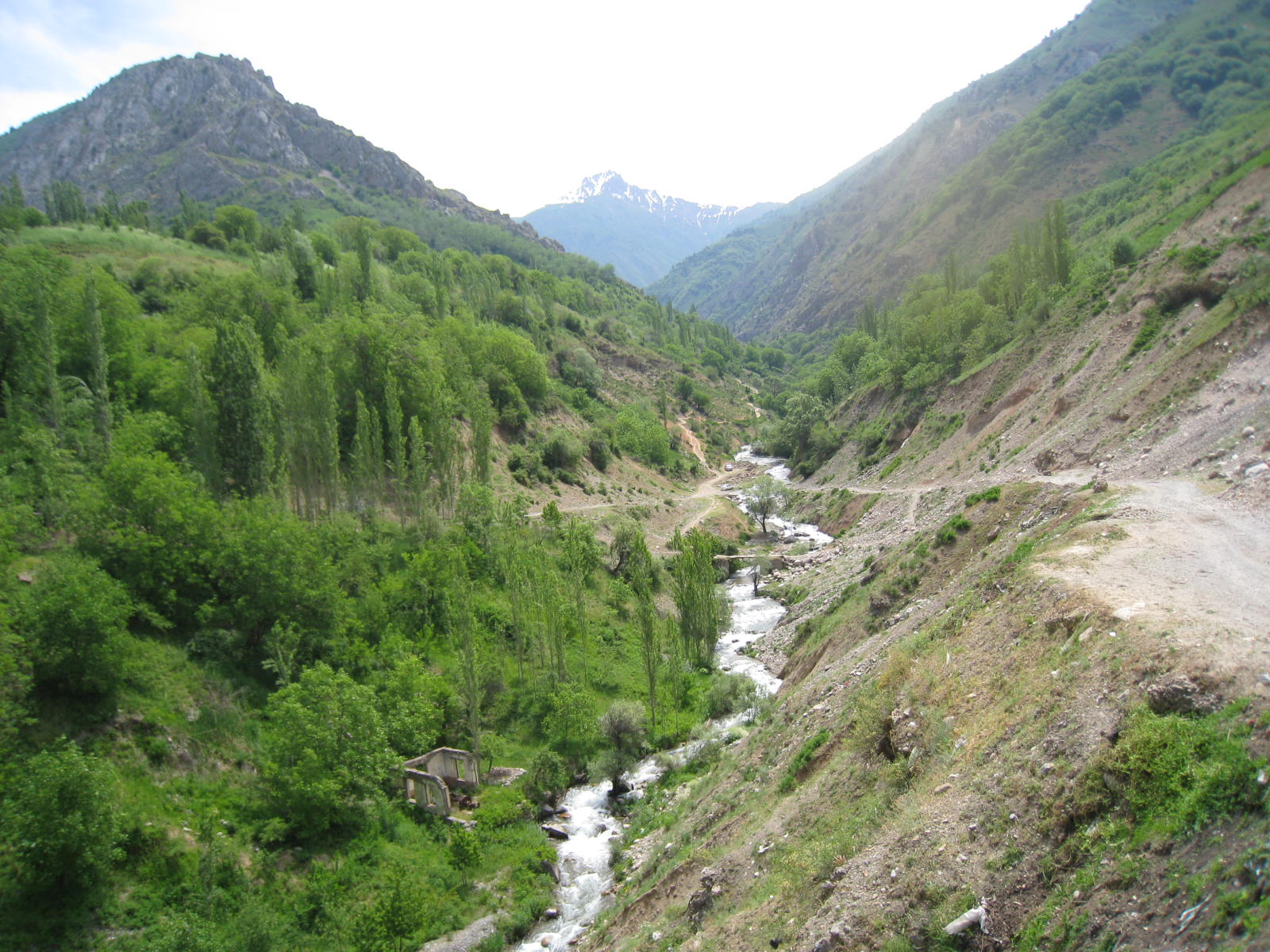

Location
- Country: Uzbekistan

Physical characteristics
- Mouth: Pskem
  - location: Lake Charvak
  - coordinates: 41.7181°N 70.1137°E

Basin features
- Progression: Pskem→ Chirchiq→ Syr Darya→ North Aral Sea

The Aksarsoy is a river in the northeast area of Tashkent Region, Uzbekistan. It originates in the Pskem Range of the Tianshan Mountains and flows into the river Pskem, at the bridge over the Pskem near the water level of Lake Charvak.

The river Aksarsoy has recently become a popular tourist destination.
