= Staraya Pokrovka, Osh =

Staraya Pokrovka Старая Покровка
- Location within Kyrgyzstan
- Coordinates: 40°41′15″N 73°9′10″E
- Country: Kyrgyzstan
- Region: Osh
- District: Özgön
- Elevation: 905 m (2,969 ft)

Population (2021)
  - Total: 2,203
- Time zone: UTC+6

Staraya Pokrovka is a village in Osh Region of Kyrgyzstan. It is part of the Özgön District. Its population was 2,203 in 2021.
