= Sergey Tolstov =

Russian and Soviet archaeologist and ethnographer

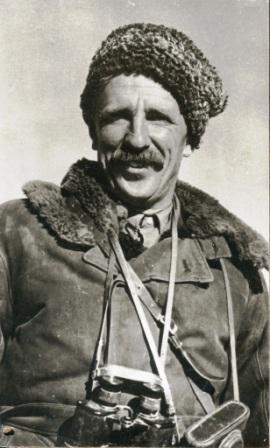
Tolstov in 1951

Sergey Pavlovich Tolstov (Russian: Сергей Павлович Толстов; 7 February 1907 – 28 December 1976) was a Russian and Soviet archaeologist and ethnographer. Tolstov was the organizer and the first director (between 1937 and 1969) of the Chorasmian Expedition credited with discovery and investigation of archeological monuments of Khwarezm. He is also the author of the book Old Khwarezm, the seminal work in the field. In 1953, Tolstov was elected the corresponding member of the Academy of Sciences of the Soviet Union.

Tolstov was born in Saint Petersburg, his father was a military officer. In 1930, he graduated from Moscow State University, where he studied at two faculties simultaneously: Physics and mathematics, and History and ethnology. Between 1929 and 1936 he was a researcher at the Museum of Peoples of the Soviet Union.

In 1939, Tolstov was appointed the head of the newly created Department of Ethnography at Moscow State University, and in 1942 he became the director of the Ethnography Institute of the Academy of Sciences of the Soviet Union. This made him the highest ranked ethnographer in the Soviet Union.
