= Özgön District =

Coordinates: 40°46′N 73°17′E

Özgön Өзгөн району Uzgen
- District
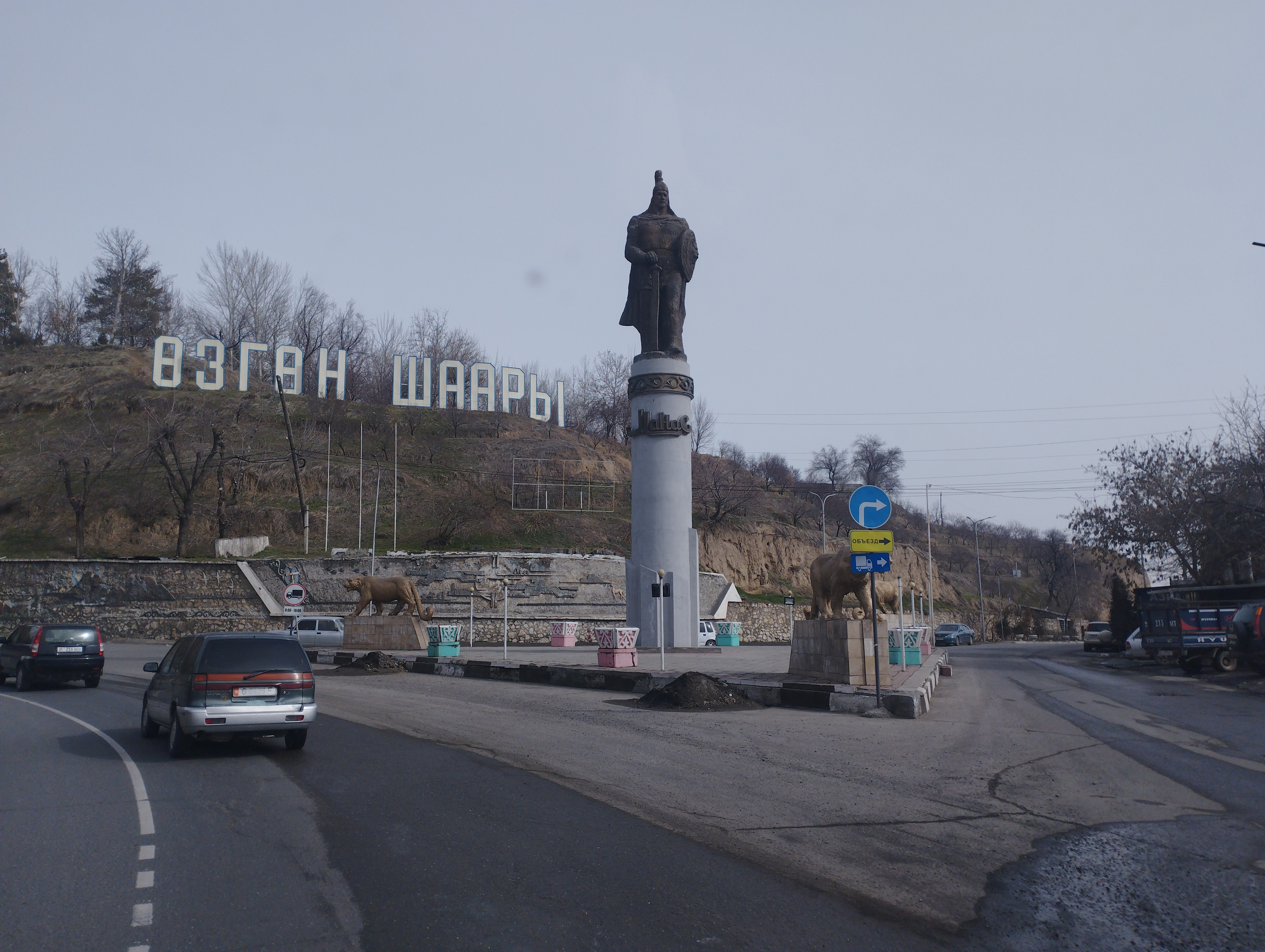

- Flag Coat of arms

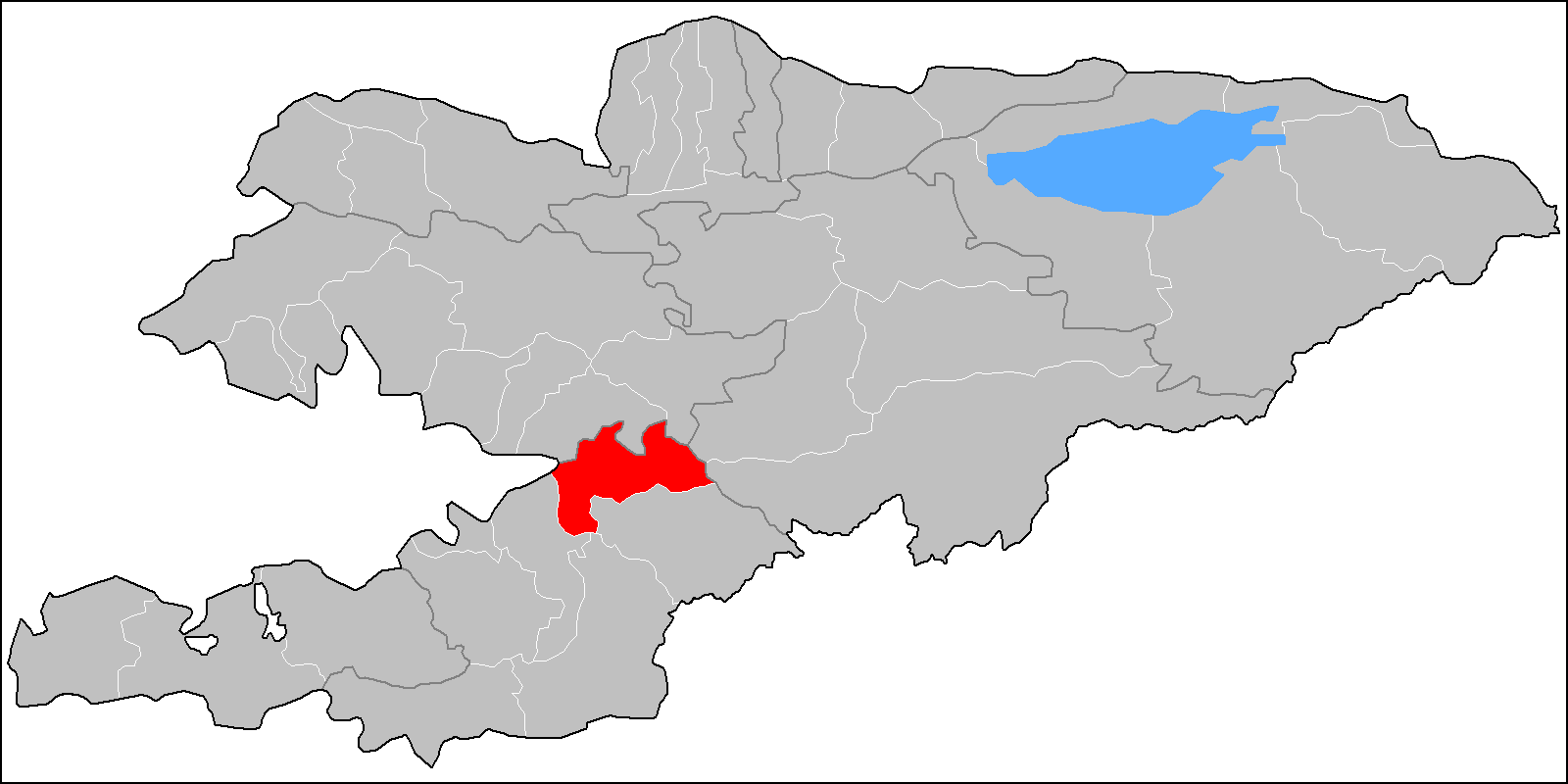
- Country: Kyrgyzstan
- Region: Osh Region

Area
  - Total: 3,308 km^{2} (1,277 sq mi)

Population (2021)
  - Total: 282,981
  - Density: 85.54/km^{2} (221.6/sq mi)
- Time zone: UTC+6 (KGT)

Özgön or Uzgen (Kyrgyz: Өзгөн району) is a district of Osh Region in south-western Kyrgyzstan. Its area is 3,308 square kilometres (1,277 sq mi), and its resident population was 282,981 in 2021. The capital lies at Özgön (Uzgen).

== Demographics ==
As of 2009, Özgön District included 1 town, and 19 villages. Its population, according to the Population and Housing Census of 2009, was 228,114. Of them, 49,410 people live in urban areas, and 178,704 in rural ones.

Historical populations in Özgön District
Year	Pop.	±% p.a.
1970	102,024	—
1979	120,980	+1.91%
1989	151,806	+2.30%
1999	193,766	+2.47%
2009	228,114	+1.65%
2021	282,981	+1.81%
Note: resident population; Sources:

=== Ethnic composition ===
According to the 2009 Census, the ethnic composition of the Özgön District (de jure population) was:

Ethnic group	Population	Proportion of Özgön District population
Kyrgyzs	168,277	73.8%
Uzbeks	50,666	22.2%
Turks	7,210	3.1%
Russians	707	0.3%
Uygurs	595	0.3%
Tatars	254	0.1%
Tadjiks	124	0.1%
other groups	281	0.1%

== Towns, rural communities and villages ==
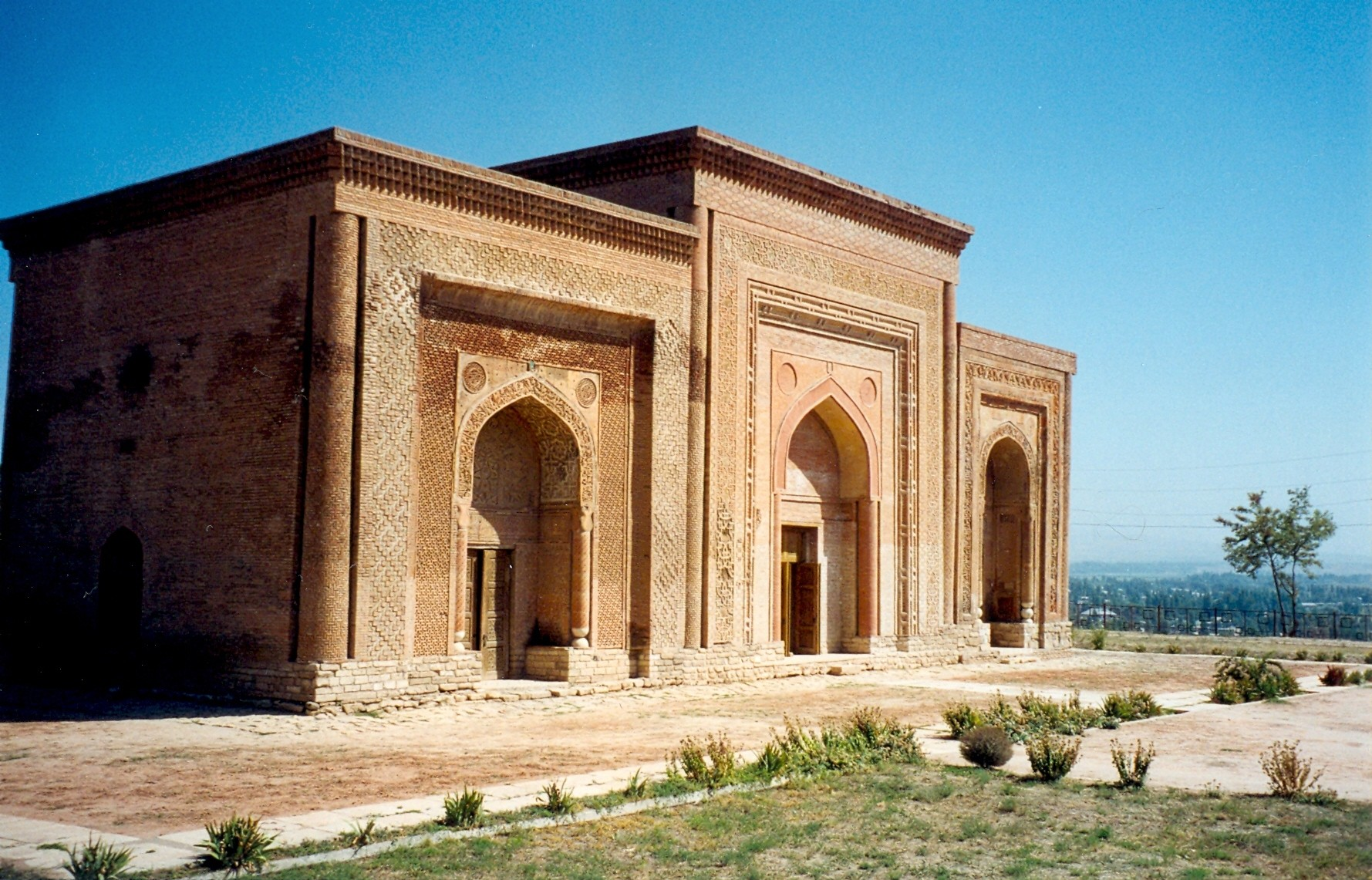
Mausoleum in Özgön

In total, Özgön District include 1 town and 107 settlements in 19 rural communities (ayyl aymagy). Each rural community can consist of one or several villages. The rural communities and settlements in the Özgön District are:

1. town Özgön
2. Ak-Jar (seat: Ak-Jar; incl. Kakyr, Semiz-Köl and Bolshevik)
3. Altyn-Bulak (seat: Altyn-Bulak; incl. Chechebay, Tash-Bashat, Sasyk-Bulak, Kara-Batkak and Kandava)
4. Bash-Döbö (seat: Kengesh; incl. Jangy-Jol, Kosh-Korgon, Kyzyl-Kyrman and Kashka-Terek)
5. Changget (seat: Changget; incl. Östürüü)
6. Deng-Bulak (seat: Bakmal; incl. Babash-Uulu, Böksö-Jol, Jangy-Abat, Deng-Bulak, Kara-Daryya, Michurin, Özgörüsh, Töölös and Chymbay)
7. Iyri-Suu (seat: Jiyde; incl. Ak-Terek, Janggakty, Kara-Kolot, Kors-Etti, Kyrgyzstan and Orkazgan)
8. Jalpak-Tash (seat: Kurbu-Tash; incl. Ak-Terek, Karl Marks, Kenjebay, Kysyk-Alma, Tuz-Bel, Üch-Kaptal, Kara-Taryk, Alcha-Bashat and Boz-Ala)
9. Jazy (seat: Kara-Dyykan; incl. Kyzyl-Dyykan, Jeerenchi and Jazy)
10. Jylandy (seat: Jylandy; incl. Kalta, Krasny Mayak, Progress, Yassy and Botomoynok)
11. Kara-Tash (seat: Iyrek; incl. Korgon, Üngkür, Yntymak and Elchibek)
12. Karool (seat: Karool; incl. Jan-Shoro, Myrza-Aryk, Orto-Aryk and Sheraly)
13. Köldük (seat: Shamal-Terek; incl. Chalk-Öydö)
14. Kurshab (seat: Kurshab; incl. Erdik and Shagym)
15. Kyzyl-Oktyabr (seat: Staraya Pokrovka; incl. Alga, Besh-Abyshka, Guzar, Kochkor-Ata, Kreml, Kurshab, Kyzyl-Oktyabr, Kyzyl-Senggir and Yntymak)
16. Kyzyl-Too (seat: Kyzyl-Too; incl. Donguz-Too, Ak-Kyya, Karchabek and Erkin-Too)
17. Myrza-Ake (seat: Myrza-Ake; incl. Adyr and Babyr)
18. Salam-Alik (7: center - village: Salam-Alik; and also villages Ak-Terek, Ara-Köl, Kosh-Eter, Kyzyl-Bayrak, Kyzyl-Charba and 15 Jash)
19. Tört-Köl (seat: Shoro-Bashat; incl. villages Ana-Kyzyl, Boston, Kyymyl and Makarenko)
20. Zerger (seat: Tosoy; incl. Ayuu, Jangy-Ayyl, Zerger, Kayrat, Kuturgan, Nichke-Say and Toktogul)
Settlements of the Özgön District.
Abbreviations: DB - Deng-Bulak, JA - Jangy-Abat, M - Michurin, P - Progress.
