= Vardablur, Aragatsotn =

Vardablur Վարդաբլուր
- Location within Armenia Location within Aragatsotn
- Coordinates: 40°41′46″N 44°13′48″E
- Country: Armenia
- Province: Aragatsotn
- Municipality: Tsaghkahovit
- Elevation: 2,000 m (6,600 ft)

Population (2011)
  - Total: 466
- Time zone: UTC+4
  - Summer (DST): UTC+5

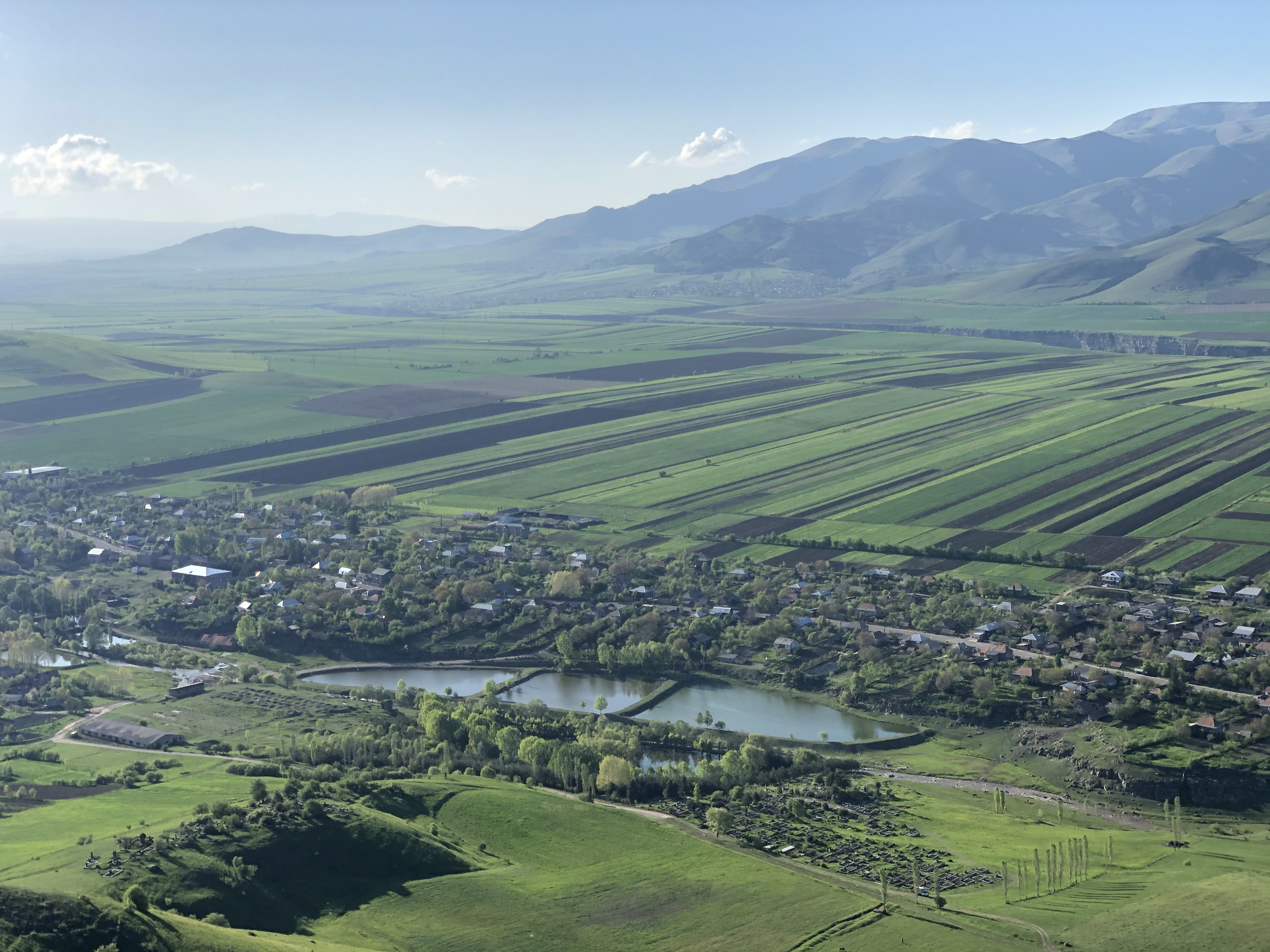

Vardablur (Armenian: Վարդաբլուր) is a village in the Tsaghkahovit Municipality of the Aragatsotn Province of Armenia.
