= Özgön =

Özgön Өзгөн Uzgen
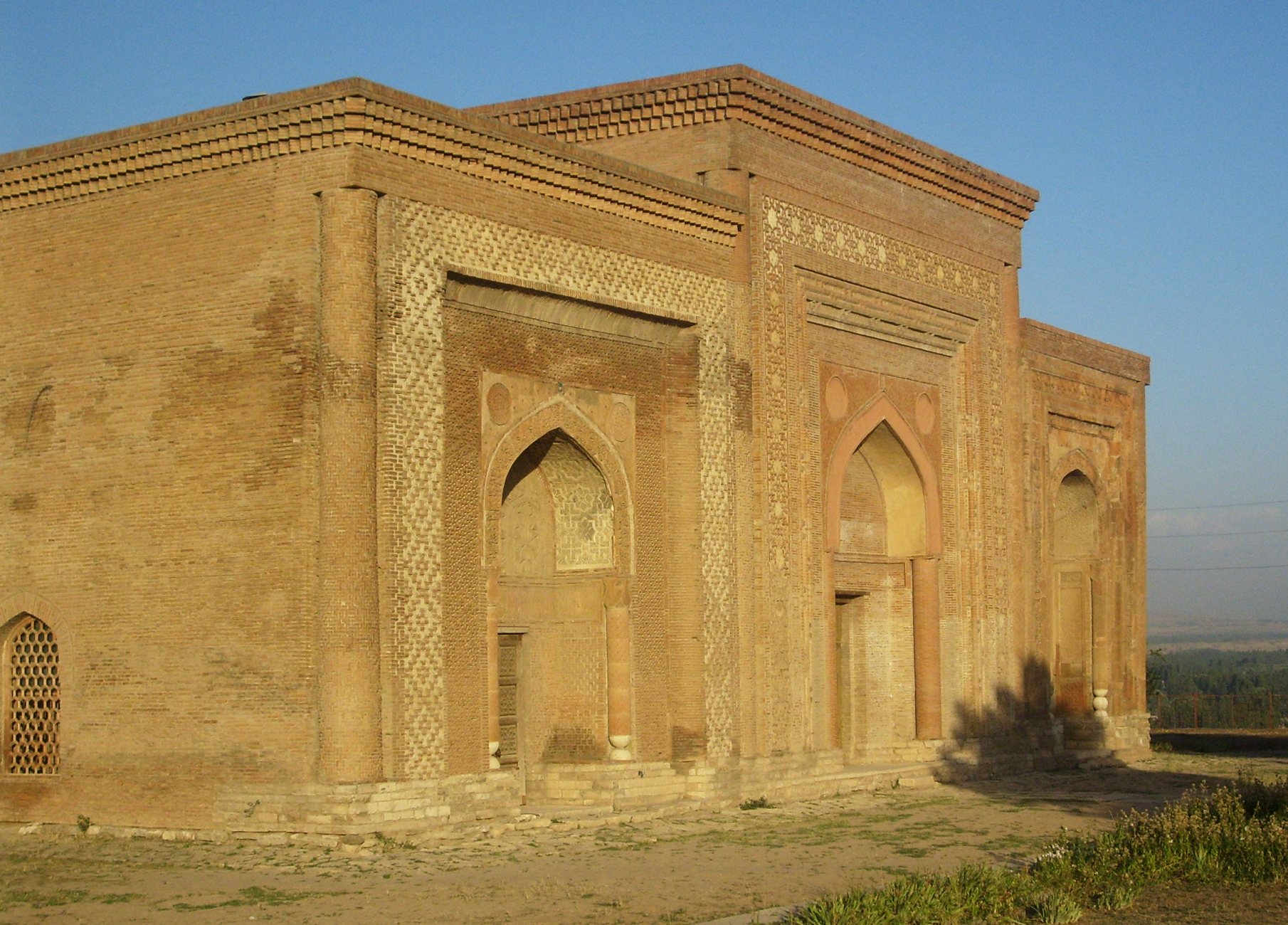
- 12th century Karakhanid mausoleum in Özgön

- Location in Kyrgyzstan Özgön (West and Central Asia) Özgön (Asia)
- Coordinates: 40°46′N 73°18′E
- Country: Kyrgyzstan
- Region: Osh Region
- District: Özgön
- Elevation: 1,029 m (3,375 ft)

Population (2021)
  - Total: 62,802
- Time zone: UTC+6 (KGT)
- Postal code: 715520

Map of Central Asia in the 8th century C.E., showing the city of Uzkand (top right, at the Eastern extremity of Farghana)

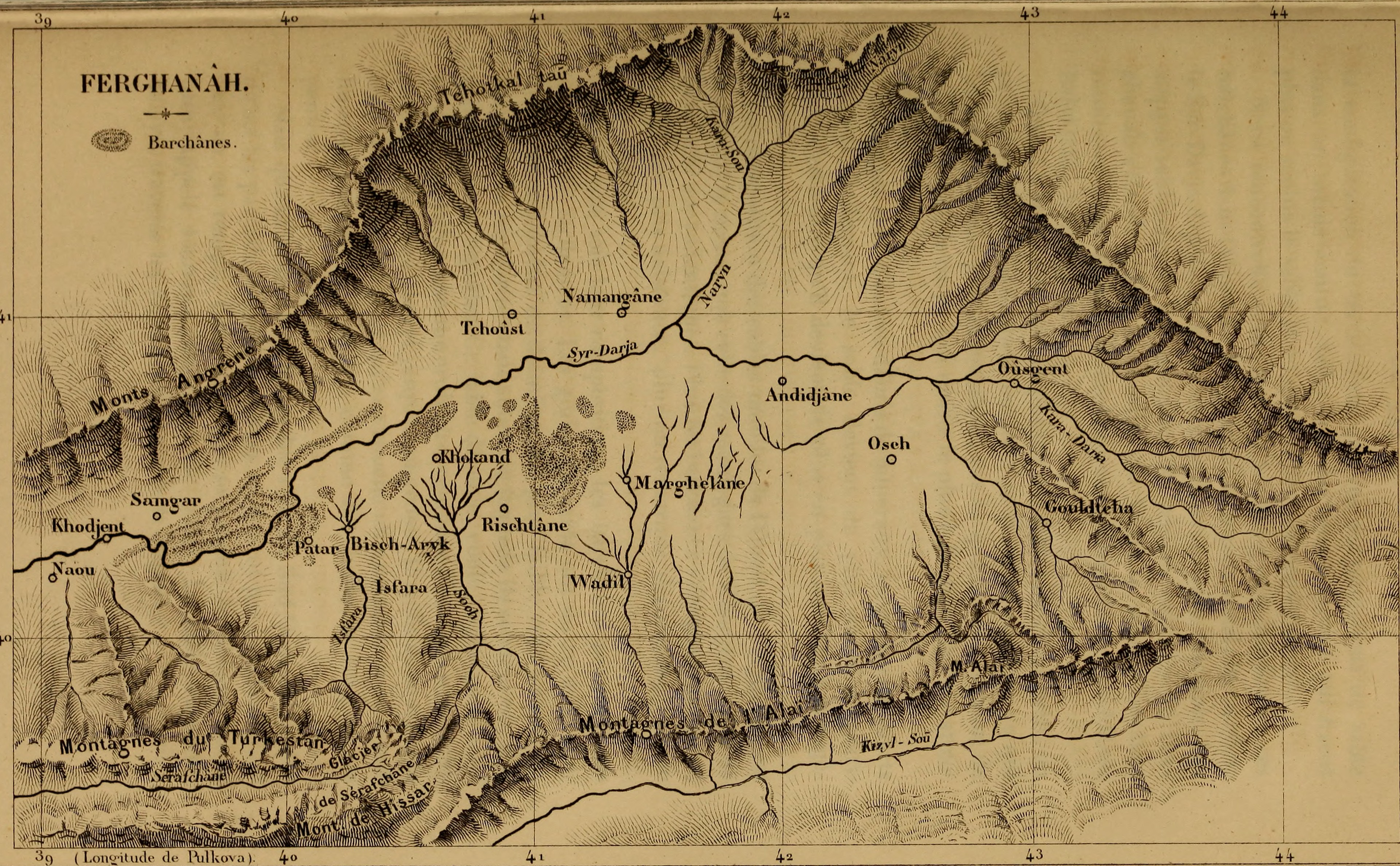
French map (1882) of the Fergana valley, showing the city (centre right) under the name of Oûsgent

Özgön (Kyrgyz: Өзгөн) or Uzgen (Russian: Узген) is a town in Osh Region, Kyrgyzstan. It is a city of district significance and the seat of Özgön District. Its population was 62,802 in 2021.

== History ==
The town is mentioned in Chinese annals of the second century BC. It was one of the capitals of the Karakhanids, who called it Mavarannahr and left three well-preserved mausolea. Özgön became the abode of Muhammad b. Nasr during the Kara-Khanid split into two branches.

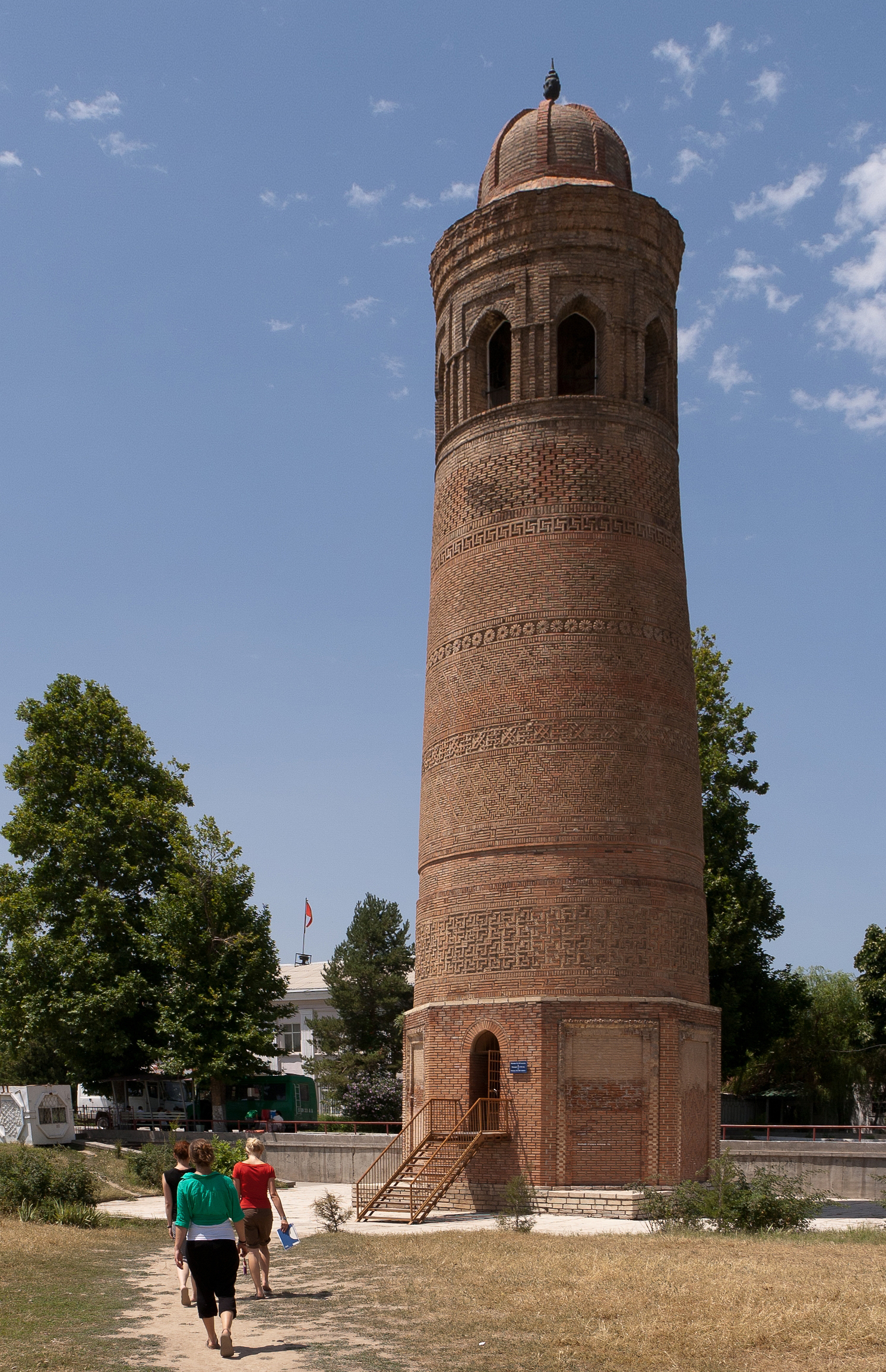
Uzgen Minaret tower.

Accounts of Özgön were found in the works of Arab writers like Al-Muqaddasi and Ibn Hawqal in the 10th century.

== Population ==
Historical population
Year	Pop.	±% p.a.
1970	23,113	—
1979	29,214	+2.64%
1989	34,167	+1.58%
1999	41,497	+1.96%
2009	49,410	+1.76%
2021	62,802	+2.02%
Note: resident population; Sources:

== Geography ==
Özgön is located at the far eastern end of the Ferghana Valley, upstream of the point where the Kara-Darya enters the valley. It is 30 miles northeast of Osh, and 20 miles southeast of Jalal-Abad on the banks of the Kara-Darya, on its right side.

=== Climate ===
Özgön has a hot summer Mediterranean continental climate (Köppen climate classification Dsa). Summers are hot and dry. Precipitation occurs mostly in winter and its adjacent months.

Climate data for Özgön (1991-2020)
Month	Jan	Feb	Mar	Apr	May	Jun	Jul	Aug	Sep	Oct	Nov	Dec	Year
Daily mean °C (°F)	−1.2 (29.8)	0.9 (33.6)	7.5 (45.5)	13.7 (56.7)	18.2 (64.8)	22.4 (72.3)	24.7 (76.5)	23.7 (74.7)	19.2 (66.6)	12.4 (54.3)	6.0 (42.8)	0.6 (33.1)	12.3 (54.2)
Average precipitation mm (inches)	40.9 (1.61)	51.2 (2.02)	77.8 (3.06)	86.3 (3.40)	71.9 (2.83)	38 (1.5)	19.6 (0.77)	10.9 (0.43)	12.6 (0.50)	54.9 (2.16)	54.6 (2.15)	40.7 (1.60)	559.4 (22.02)
Average precipitation days (≥ 0.1 mm)	7	7.4	8.6	8.1	8.7	6.4	4.4	3.1	2.9	4.9	5.7	6.1	73.3
Average relative humidity (%)	77.3	74.9	66.6	56.8	51.8	44.6	46.1	50	52.8	60.2	69	77.9	60.7
Source 1: NOAA
Source 2: "The Climate of Uzgen". Weatherbase.

== Famous people ==
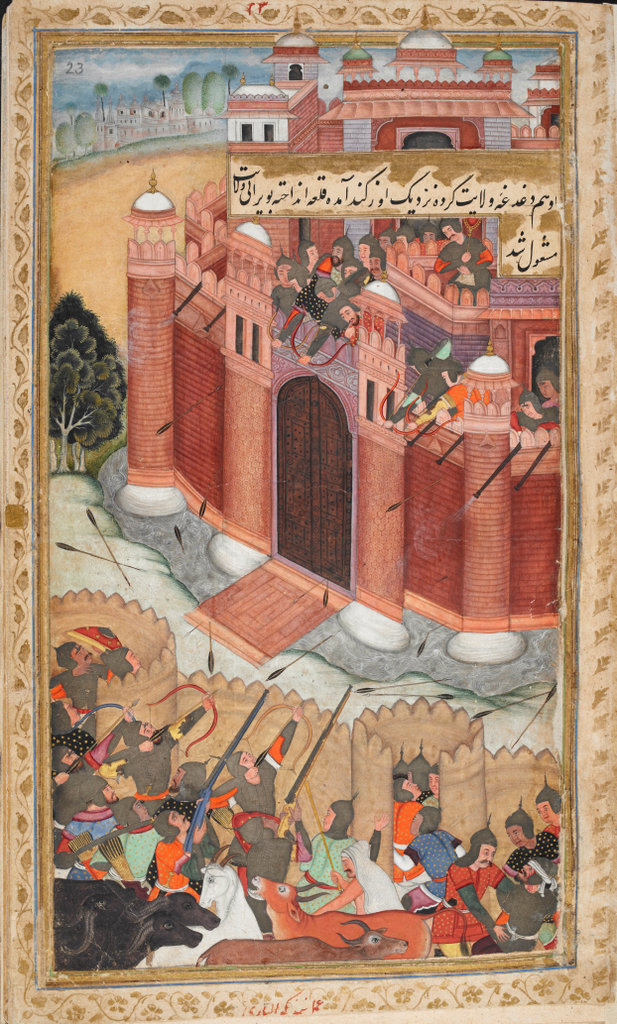
Mirza Abu Bakr Dughlat's unsuccessful attempt to capture Özgön (from the Baburnama).

- Salizhan Sharipov, born in 1964, astronaut

One of the middle/high schools of Özgön was named after him.
