= Fergana Range =

Mountain range in Kyrgyzstan

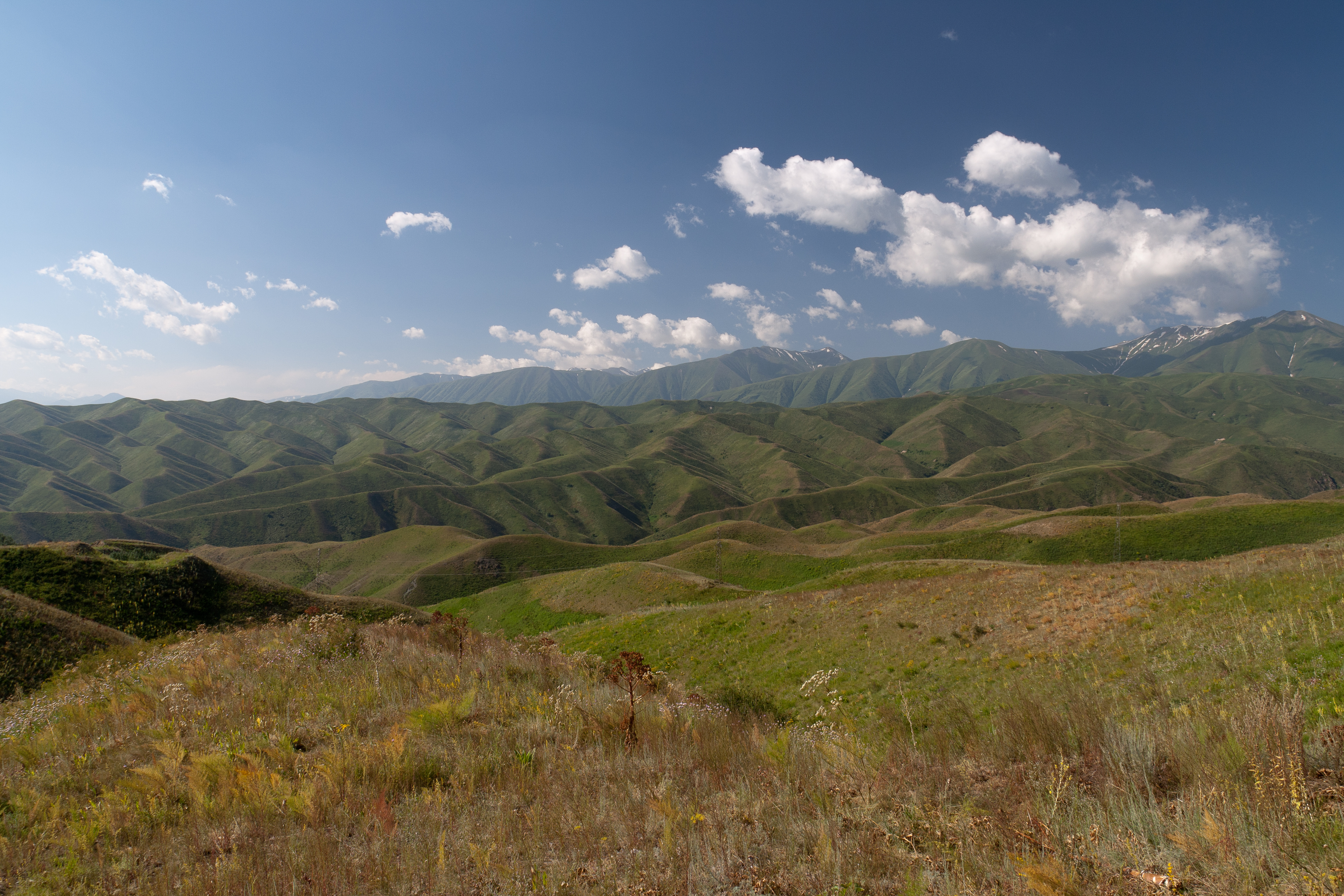

Highest point
- Elevation: 4,893 m (16,053 ft)

Dimensions
- Length: 206 km (128 mi) NW-SE
- Width: 62 km (39 mi) NE-SW

Naming
- Native name: Фергана тоо кыркасы (Kyrgyz)

Geography
- Location within Kyrgyzstan
- Country: Kyrgyzstan
- Region(s): Naryn Region, Osh Region, Jalal-Abad Region
- Range coordinates: 41°0.25′N 73°56.25′E

Geology
- Rock type(s): Composed of sandstones, limestones, and schists

The Fergana Range (Kyrgyz: Фергана тоо кыркасы; Russian: Ферганский хребет) is a mountain range of the Tian Shan in Kyrgyzstan. The length of the range is 206 km, and the average height is 3,600 m above sea level. The highest mountain is 4,893 m above sea level.

== Geography ==
The Fergana Range stretches from north-west to south-east, separating the Fergana Valley and the inner Tian Shan. The south-east section of the range is higher. It joins the Torugart Range and the Alaykuu Ridge via the Söök Pass (4024 m). The South-west slope is long and low-sloped, the north-east - short and steep. Mountain ranges southwest are denoted by collective term: Pamir-Alay system.

== Geology ==
The Fergana Range is composed of schist, sandstone, limestone, and other sedimentary metamorphic formations ruptured by intrusions of gabbro and diabase.
