= Besh-Badam =

Besh-Badam Беш-Бадам
- Location within Kyrgyzstan
- Coordinates: 41°08′30″N 72°53′10″E
- Country: Kyrgyzstan
- Region: Jalal-Abad
- District: Bazar-Korgon
- Elevation: 1,082 m (3,550 ft)

Population (2021)
  - Total: 1,720
- Time zone: UTC+6

Besh-Badam is a village in Jalal-Abad Region of Kyrgyzstan. Its population was 1,720 in 2021. Formerly a village within the rural community (ayyl aymagy) of Bazar-Korgon, it was merged into the new city of Bazar-Korgon in January 2021.

The town of Karacha is 5 miles (8 km) to the southwest, and Kyzyl-Oktyabr is 5 miles (8 km) to the west.
