= Besh-Jygach =

Besh-Jygach Беш-Жыгач
- Location within Kyrgyzstan
- Coordinates: 41°02′10″N 72°37′20″E
- Country: Kyrgyzstan
- Region: Jalal-Abad Region
- District: Nooken District
- Elevation: 645 m (2,116 ft)

Population (2021)
  - Total: 659
- Time zone: UTC+6

Besh-Jygach is a village in Jalal-Abad Region of Kyrgyzstan. It is part of Nooken District. Its population was 659 in 2021.

The town of Masy is 2.3 km (1.4 mi) to the northeast, and Bögöt is 3.4 km (2.1 mi) to the east.
