= Azimzhan Askarov =

Kyrgyz activist and journalist (1951–2020)

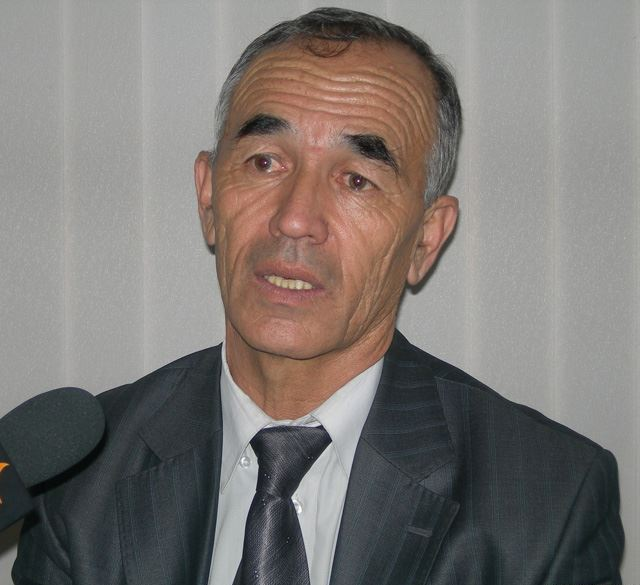
- Askarov in 2013
- Born: 17 May 1951; Bazar-Korgon, Kyrgyz SSR
- Died: 25 July 2020 (aged 69); Bishkek, Kyrgyzstan
- Occupation: Journalist
- Known for: Human rights activism, allegedly political imprisonment
- Awards: Homo Homini Award (2011); CPJ International Press Freedom Award (2012); 2014 Human Rights Defender Award (2015)

Azimzhan Askarov (Uzbek: Azimjon Asqarov, Азимжон Асқаров; 17 May 1951 – 25 July 2020) was a Kyrgyzstani political activist who founded the group Vozduh in 2002 to investigate police brutality. Of ethnic Uzbek descent, during the 2010 South Kyrgyzstan ethnic clashes, which primarily targeted people of the Uzbek nationality, Askarov worked to document the violence.

He was subsequently arrested and prosecuted on charges of creating mass disturbances, incitement of ethnic hatred, and complicity in murder. Following a trial protested by several international human rights groups for irregularities—including alleged torture and the courtroom intimidation of witnesses by police—Askarov was given a life sentence, which he was serving. In November 2010, Askarov's health was reported to be rapidly deteriorating as a result of his confinement. Numerous groups advocated on his behalf, including Human Rights Watch, Reporters Without Borders, People In Need, the Committee to Protect Journalists, and Amnesty International, the latter of which designated him a prisoner of conscience.

In 2015, the U.S. conferred the 2014 Human Rights Defender Award on Askarov. The Kyrgyz government protested this decision and formally terminated a 1993 agreement on cooperation between the U.S. and Kyrgyzstan. On 12 July 2016, the Supreme Court of Kyrgyzstan revoked the life sentence against Askarov and sent his case to the Chui Oblast Court for review. He was resentenced for life on 24 January 2017. Following amendments to Kyrgyzstan's Criminal Code in 2017, which came into force in 2019, Askarov's lawyers applied for a review of his sentence. However, on 30 July 2019, the Chui regional court upheld the life sentence of Askarov. He died in prison in 2020.

== Personal life ==
Askarov was born on 17 May 1951, in the village Bazar-Korgon, Kyrgyzstan. He attended an arts college in Tashkent. After getting his degree, Askarov worked as a painter and decorator for 15 years. In the early 1990s, he began writing about human rights issues in a local newspaper. He was married to Hadicha Askarova and they had three sons.

== Human rights work ==
Askarov worked as a human rights activist since the mid-1990s. In 2002, he founded the group Vozduh ("Air") to monitor the conditions of Kyrgyz prisons. Working primarily in the area of Bazar-Korgon, Askarov directed this group until the time of his arrest and was able to initiate new investigations of several cases of police brutality and torture. Several police officers were dismissed from their posts as a result of Askarov's investigations. Askarov has stated that in 2006, a prosecutor's investigator sued Askarov following an article he wrote publicizing torture allegations; the six-month court case ended with a verdict in Askarov's favor. As a result, Askarov claimed, "Enemies in the law enforcement community were constantly looking for an opportunity to shut me down."

== Arrest and trial ==
In July 2010, Kyrgyzstan saw an outbreak of ethnic violence in which as many as 400 people, both Kyrgyz and Uzbek, were killed, and hundreds of thousands of Uzbeks displaced. Following the violence, dozens of Uzbek community and religious leaders were arrested by the Kyrgyzstani government and accused of inciting ethnic violence, among them Azimzhan Askarov, who had been filming killings and arson attacks during the riots. Askarov then distributed the video to international media and accused the Kyrgyz military of complicity in the killings.

He was arrested on 15 June 2010 in Bazar-Korgon. Kyrgyzstan's human rights ombudsman, Tursunbek Akun, protested the arrest shortly after.

Askarov was tried along with other human rights activists before a court in the Nooken District of the Jalal-Abad Province. An observer from Human Rights Watch stated that both the defendants and the witnesses evidenced fresh bruises and appeared to have been tortured. The observer also stated that members of the trial's audience openly threatened and assaulted Askarov, other defendants, and their lawyers inside the courtroom, and that local law enforcement refused to intervene. Askarov's lawyer, Nurbek Toktagunov, stated that he was also approached by the relatives of a police officer and threatened with violence if he continued to defend Askarov, leading Amnesty International to issue an appeal for the safety of both Toktagunov and Askarov.

Askarov himself testified that he had been beaten and tortured while in police custody, and his lawyer reported that Askarov had further bruises on his back. On 4 November 2010, however, the prosecutor's office held a press conference to deny any beatings had taken place.

== Imprisonment and health ==
On 10 November 2010, Askarov's sentence was upheld by an appellate court. Two days later, Amnesty International reported that Askarov's health was failing rapidly; he was soon moved from his prison hospital to a hospital in Bishkek. Members of his family expressed concern that he was receiving inadequate care from prison authorities.

On 8 February 2011, the Kyrgyzstani Supreme Court agreed to hear new evidence in Askarov's case; however, his hearing was suspended. On 11 April 2011, his appeal hearing was postponed for the second time. On 20 December 2011, the Kyrgyzstani Supreme Court upheld Askarov's sentence.

Askarov's lawyer then said he would protest the Supreme Court's decision in the UN Human Rights Council; however, Askarov himself was against this, fearing not being able to survive until the day of decision. Askarov insisted on the review of his case in the Kyrgyz legislature.

On 24 January 2017, a Kyrgyz court found Askarov guilty and sentenced him to life in prison. Following amendments to Kyrgyzstan's Criminal Code in 2017, which came into force in 2019, Askarov's lawyers applied for a review of his sentence. However, on 30 July 2019, the Chui regional court upheld the life sentence of Askarov.

== International attention ==
Amnesty International, Human Rights Watch, the Committee to Protect Journalists, Front Line, International Partnership for Human Rights (IPHR), and the International Federation for Human Rights have all denounced the charges against Askarov. The Committee to Protect Journalists called for him and fellow detainee Ulugbek Abdusalomov to be released, and for the officers who arrested them to be investigated for "abuse of office". His cause has also been championed by American actor Martin Sheen. The US Embassy in Bishkek also put pressure on the Kyrgyz government to hold "impartial hearings" on Askarov's appeal. Reporters Without Borders called for his immediate release.

On 8 March 2011, People In Need awarded him the Homo Homini Award "in recognition of a dedication to the promotion of human rights, democracy and non-violent solutions to political conflicts." In an acceptance speech written from prison, Askarov responded, "I cried like a baby. There are no words to express my heartfelt joy. After much suffering, torture and humiliation, I realized once again the high social value of fighting for human rights and justice!"

In May 2011, an exhibition of Askarov's paintings opened in Bishkek, organized by his wife and various Kyrgyz human rights organizations. The paintings focus on "the inhabitants of the Fergana valley and scenes from their everyday lives."

In 2012, Askarov won the International Press Freedom Award of the Committee to Protect Journalists. The award recognizes journalists who show courage in defending press freedom despite facing attacks, threats, or imprisonment.

In 2015, the U.S. conferred the 2014 Human Rights Defender Award on Askarov and Foro Penal, a Venezuelan non-governmental organization. In a press release announcing the award, the United States Department of State stated that Askarov had "documented acts of death and destruction during the interethnic violence in June 2010, before being himself arrested on charges connected to those events." The Kyrgyz government protested this decision and formally terminated a 1993 agreement on cooperation between the U.S. and Kyrgyzstan.

== Death ==
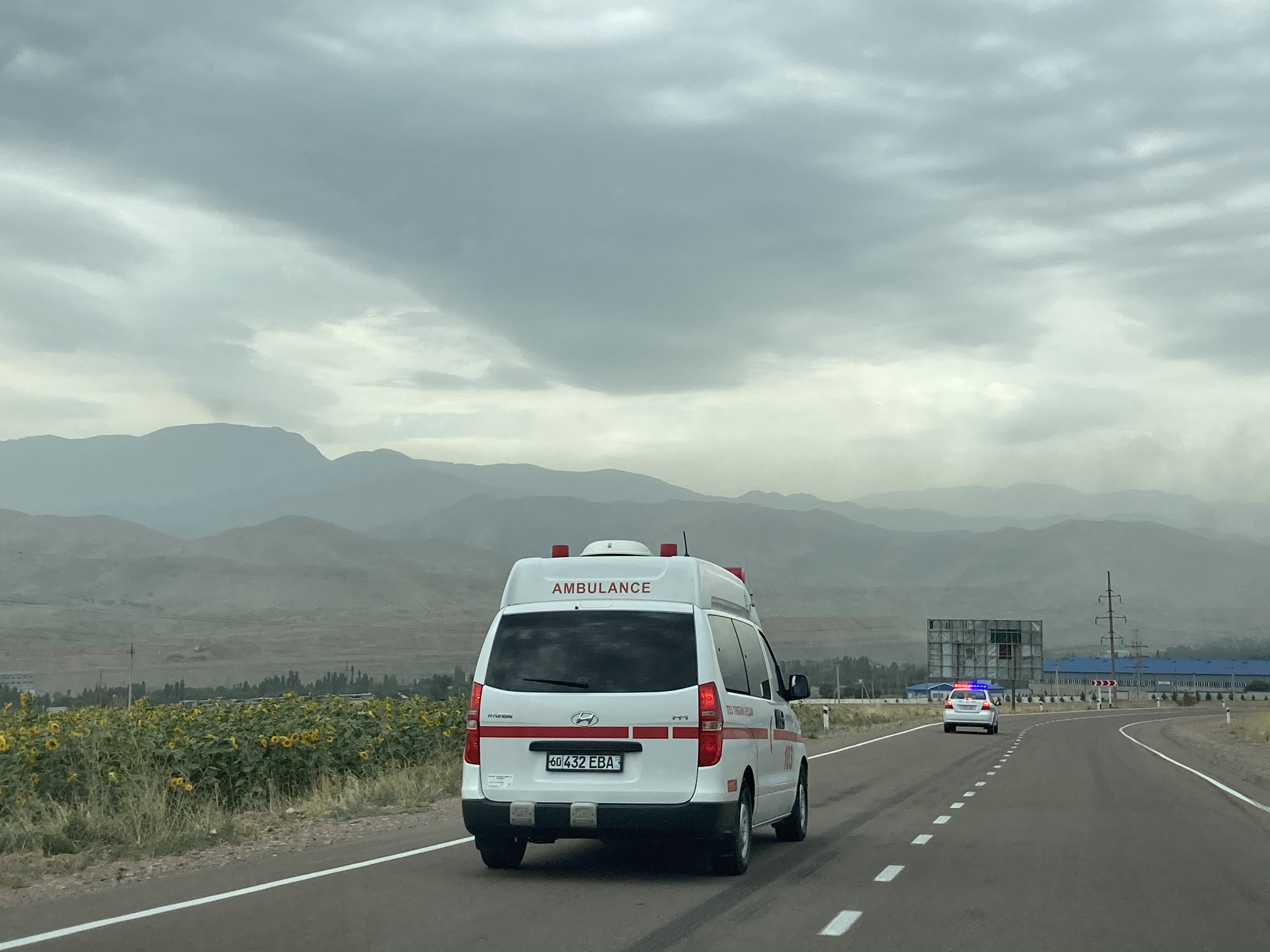
Askarov's body was transported from Kyrgyzstan to Uzbekistan for burial.

Askarov died on 25 July 2020, one day after being hospitalized with pneumonia. He was 69, and suffered from a heart condition and other chronic illnesses in the time leading up to his death. He was buried in Tashkent Region, Uzbekistan, on 31 July. Prior to his death Askarov had requested to be buried in Uzbekistan. Moreover, his relatives feared that in Kyrgyzstan his grave would be a target for vandalism by Kyrgyz nationalists.

In 2022, Human Rights Watch raised concerns that an investigation into his death had not yet been concluded, stating that his death "remains a dark stain on Kyrgyzstan's human rights record, further marred by new deaths in custody in the Kyrgyz prison system."
