= Kök-Tash =

Kök-Tash may refer to the following places in Kyrgyzstan:

- Kök-Tash, Batken, a village in Batken District, Batken Region
- Kök-Tash, Leylek, a village in Leylek District, Batken Region
- Kök-Tash, Mayluu-Suu, a town in the city of Mayluu-Suu, Jalal-Abad Region
- Kök-Tash, Ala-Buka, a village in Ala-Buka District, Jalal-Abad Region
- Kök-Tash, Nooken, a village in Nooken District, Jalal-Abad Region
- Kök-Tash, Toktogul, a village in Toktogul District, Jalal-Abad Region
- Kök-Tash, Osh, a village in Alay District, Osh Region
- Kök-Tash, Talas, a village in Bakay-Ata District, Talas Region
