= Kyrgyz-Gava Botanical Reserve =

- IUCN category IV (habitat/species management area)
- Location within Kyrgyzstan
- Location: Bazar-Korgon District, Jalal-Abad Region, Kyrgyzstan
- Coordinates: 41°12′N 72°51′E
- Area: 50 ha (120 acres)
- Established: 1975

The Kyrgyz-Gava Botanical Reserve (Kyrgyz: Кыргыз-Гава ботаникалык заказниги, also Кыргызкаба Kyrgyzkaba) is located in Bazar-Korgon District of Jalal-Abad Region of Kyrgyzstan. It was established in 1975 with a purpose of conservation of endemic Juno magnifica. The botanical reserve occupies 50 hectares. It is located near the village Sary-Jayyk (formerly Kyrgyzkaba).
