= Kyzyl-Üngkür =

Kyzyl-Üngkür Кызыл-Үңкүр
- Location within Kyrgyzstan
- Coordinates: 41°21′36″N 73°3′36″E
- Country: Kyrgyzstan
- Region: Jalal-Abad
- District: Bazar-Korgon
- Elevation: 1,241 m (4,072 ft)

Population (2021)
  - Total: 500
- Time zone: UTC+6

Kyzyl-Üngkür (Kyrgyz: Кызыл-Үңкүр) is a village in Jalal-Abad Region, Kyrgyzstan. It is part of the Bazar-Korgon District. Its population was 500 in 2021. A road runs from the village southwest down the Kyzyl-Ünkür valley 60 km (37 mi) or more to Bazar-Korgon on the main M41 highway near the Uzbek border. From the valley, a branch road goes northwest to Arslanbob.
