= Alatay Nature Park =

Nature park in Jalal-Abad Region, Kyrgyzstan

Alatay State Nature Park
- Алатай мамлекеттик жаратылыш паркы
- IUCN category II (national park)
- Landscape of Alatay Nature Park

- Location within Kyrgyzstan
- Location: Toktogul District, Jalal-Abad Region, Kyrgyzstan
- Coordinates: 41°57′N 72°15′E
- Area: 56,826.4 ha (568.264 km^{2})
- Established: January 26, 2016

Alatay Nature Park (Kyrgyz: Алатай мамлекеттик жаратылыш паркы), officially Alatay State Nature Park, is a protected area in Toktogul District, Jalal-Abad Region, Kyrgyzstan. It was established on 26 January 2016 to conserve natural complexes and biodiversity and protect rare and endangered plants and animals. The park covers 56,826.4 ha (568.264 km^{2}) in the western Tian Shan.

== History ==
Nature protection in the area predates the establishment of the park. In 1975, the Council of Ministers of the Kirghiz SSR established the Uzun-Akmat Forest Reserve, covering 14,771 ha (147.71 km^{2}), under Resolution No. 567. Its purpose was to protect natural stands of Semenov's fir and rare and endangered plants and animals.

On 27 May 1992, the Government of the Republic of Kyrgyzstan adopted Resolution No. 253 on the establishment of the reserve and approved its regulations. These confirmed its area of 14,771 ha (147.71 km^{2}) and divided it into the Uzun-Akmat and Alatay sectors.

Alatay State Nature Park was subsequently established on 26 January 2016 under Government Resolution No. 27.

== Geography ==
The park encompasses mountain valleys around the Alatay and Uzun-Akmat rivers, northwest of the Toktogul Reservoir. It lies at the junction of the Talas Alatau and Chatkal Range. Sary-Chelek Nature Reserve is to the west and Besh-Tash Nature Park to the northwest. At its establishment, the park incorporated land from the Cholpon-Ata and Üch-Terek rural communities and the state forest fund.

The park's management planning document distinguishes two separate areas: the main Alatay sector and the water surface of Kara-Suu Lake. The boundary of the lake sector follows the outline of the lake's water surface.

Kara-Suu Lake lies between the Takhtalyk and Ken-Kel ranges, at an elevation of about 2,022 m (6,634 ft). Formed by a natural rock barrier, it is connected with Kapka-Tash Lake and drains into the Kara-Suu River, a left tributary of the Naryn. The lake generally freezes in late December and thaws in April.

=== Relief ===
The park contains three main types of mountain relief: dissected low mountains, rounded mountain massifs and rugged rocky high mountains. The low mountains generally lie at elevations of 1,700–2,000 m (5,600–6,600 ft) and have flat summits and steep-sided valleys. Rounded massifs with dome-shaped summits and deep valleys predominate across the park. The high mountains have pointed peaks, rocky ridges and narrow gorges, locally forming canyons with sheer walls and extensive scree slopes.

=== Soils ===
The park extends across low-, middle- and high-mountain soil belts within the Western Tian Shan soil province of southern Kyrgyzstan. Its soils include calcareous brown mountain soils, dark forest soils, chernozem-like mountain meadow soils, meadow-steppe soils and alpine turf-peat soils. Their distribution varies with elevation, slope aspect and vegetation: forest soils occur beneath walnut-fruit and spruce woodland, while meadow and meadow-steppe soils characterise the subalpine and alpine belts.

== Flora ==
An inventory conducted in 2018 by scientists from the Institute of Biology of the National Academy of Sciences of Kyrgyzstan recorded 518 species of vascular plants. The park's woody flora includes 56 species of trees and shrubs, among them Schrenk's spruce, walnut, junipers, birches and maples.

Plants listed in the Red Data Book of Kyrgyzstan include Semenov's fir, Tulipa anadroma, Sievers's apple and Sorbus persica. Endemic plants reported from the park include Exochorda tianschanica, Abelia corymbosa and Allium pseudowinklerianum.

== Fauna ==
The 2018 inventory recorded 111 species of birds and 30 species of mammals. Mammals include the snow leopard, Eurasian lynx, brown bear, wolf, stone marten and Siberian ibex. Birds include the black stork, golden eagle, bearded vulture and Egyptian vulture. Several of these species are listed in the Red Data Book of Kyrgyzstan.

Native fish inhabit the Uzun-Akmat river and Kara-Kulja river and their tributaries. Kara-Suu Lake supports four native fish species and three introduced species, including peled and trout.

== Management and zoning ==
According to the park's management planning document, functional zoning was carried out in 2016 by the Department of Forest and Hunting Inventory together with park staff. Four zones were identified:

Functional zones of Alatay Nature Park
Zone	Area (ha)
Strict protection	13,891.8
Ecological stabilisation	1,963.4
Tourism and recreation	1,384.6
Limited economic activity	39,586.6
Total	56,826.4

== Conservation ==
A 2022 UNDP publication identified overgrazing as a major pressure on the park's vegetation, with plants avoided by livestock gradually replacing forage plants. It also reported that introduced trout had adversely affected native fish in the area's rivers through predation.

In January 2024, UNDP reported the establishment of the Chatkal ecological corridor and the Kabak buffer quiet zone, covering a combined 89,000 ha (890 km^{2}). These link Alatay, Sary-Chelek and Padysha-Ata protected areas to facilitate wildlife migration.
