= Komintern, Kyrgyzstan =

Komintern Коминтерн
- Location within Kyrgyzstan
- Coordinates: 41°02′30″N 72°35′10″E
- Country: Kyrgyzstan
- Region: Jalal-Abad
- District: Nooken
- Elevation: 604 m (1,982 ft)

Population (2021)
  - Total: 4,498
- Time zone: UTC+6

Komintern (Kyrgyz: Коминтерн, formerly Nooken or Naukent) is a village in Jalal-Abad Region of Kyrgyzstan. It is part of Nooken District. Its population was 4,498 in 2021. It lies along the M41 highway (Bishkek–Osh), between Masy and Kochkor-Ata. It lies about 9 km from the Uzbek border, about 40 kilometres (25 mi) northeast of Andijon, Uzbekistan. It was part of Fergana Oblast in the Russian Empire. Historically it had a citadel due to its strategical location, which was taken by Shahbaz.
