= Itsay =

- Location within Kyrgyzstan

Location
- Country: Kyrgyzstan

Physical characteristics
- Mouth: Naryn
  - coordinates: 41°34′39″N 72°32′04″E

Basin features
- Progression: Naryn→ Syr Darya→ North Aral Sea

The Itsay (Kyrgyz: Итсай) is a right tributary of the Naryn in Jalal-Abad Region, Kyrgyzstan. Its source is in the Atoynok Kyrka Toosu range, western Tian Shan mountains. It discharges into the Naryn southwest of Kara-Köl.
