= Jangy-Aryk, Nooken =

Jangy-Aryk Жаңы-Арык
- Location within Kyrgyzstan
- Coordinates: 41°03′05″N 72°19′34″E
- Country: Kyrgyzstan
- Region: Jalal-Abad
- District: Nooken

Population (2021)
  - Total: 5,859
- Time zone: UTC+6

Jangy-Aryk (Kyrgyz: Жаңы-Арык) is a village in Jalal-Abad Region of Kyrgyzstan. It is part of the Nooken District. Its population was 5,859 in 2021.

== Population ==
Historical population
Year	Pop.	±% p.a.
2009	5,861	—
2021	5,859	−0.00%
Note: resident population; Sources:
