= Arimjan =

Arimjan Аримжан
- Location within Kyrgyzstan
- Coordinates: 41°1′48″N 72°33′36″E
- Country: Kyrgyzstan
- Region: Jalal-Abad Region
- District: Nooken District
- Elevation: 586 m (1,923 ft)

Population (2021)
  - Total: 2,141
- Time zone: UTC+6

Arimjan is a village in Jalal-Abad Region of Kyrgyzstan. It is part of Nooken District. Its population was 2,141 in 2021.
