= Mogol-Korgon =

Mogol-Korgon Могол-Коргон
- Location within Kyrgyzstan
- Coordinates: 41°2′20″N 72°42′30″E
- Country: Kyrgyzstan
- Region: Jalal-Abad
- District: Bazar-Korgon

Population (2021)
  - Total: 1,469
- Time zone: UTC+6

Mogol-Korgon is a village in Jalal-Abad Region of Kyrgyzstan. It is part of the Bazar-Korgon District. Its population was 1,469 in 2021.
