= Kayyrma, Jalal-Abad =

Kayyrma Кайырма
- Location within Kyrgyzstan
- Coordinates: 40°59′20″N 72°48′0″E
- Country: Kyrgyzstan
- Region: Jalal-Abad
- District: Bazar-Korgon

Population (2021)
  - Total: 2,554
- Time zone: UTC+6

Kayyrma is a village in Jalal-Abad Region of Kyrgyzstan. It is part of the Bazar-Korgon District. Its population was 2,554 in 2021.
