= Kyzyl-Jyldyz =

Kyzyl-Jyldyz may refer to the following places in Kyrgyzstan:

- Kyzyl-Jyldyz, Jalal-Abad, a village in Nooken District, Jalal-Abad Region
- Kyzyl-Jyldyz, Jumgal, a village in Jumgal District, Naryn Region
- Kyzyl-Jyldyz, Naryn, a village in Naryn District, Naryn Region
- Kyzyl-Jyldyz, Talas, a village in Manas District, Talas Region
