= Birinchi May =

Birinchi May (Kyrgyz for "First of May") may refer to the following places in Kyrgyzstan:

- Birinchi May District, Bishkek, a district of the capital Bishkek
- Birinchi May, Jayyl, a village in Jayyl District, Chuy Region
- Birinchi May, Panfilov, a village in Panfilov District, Chuy Region
- Birinchi May, Jalal-Abad, a village in Jalal-Abad Region
- Birinchi May, Naryn, a village in Naryn Region
- Birinchi May, Alay, a village in Alay District, Osh Region
- Birinchi May, Kara-Kulja, a village in Kara-Kulja District, Osh Region
