= Tegerek Waterfall =

Waterfall and protected area in Kyrgyzstan

- Тегерек шаркыратмасы
- Location: Bazar-Korgon District, Jalal-Abad Region, Kyrgyzstan
- Designation: Geological reserve
- Established: 1975

Tegerek Waterfall (Kyrgyz: Тегерек шаркыратмасы) is a waterfall and natural monument in Bazar-Korgon District, Jalal-Abad Region, Kyrgyzstan. It is located in the upper course of the Kara-Üngkür and is formed in Paleozoic limestone. The waterfall is surrounded by wild walnut and fruit forest. Tegerek Waterfall has been protected as a geological reserve since 1975.
