= Arslanbob =

Arslanbob Арсланбоб
- Village
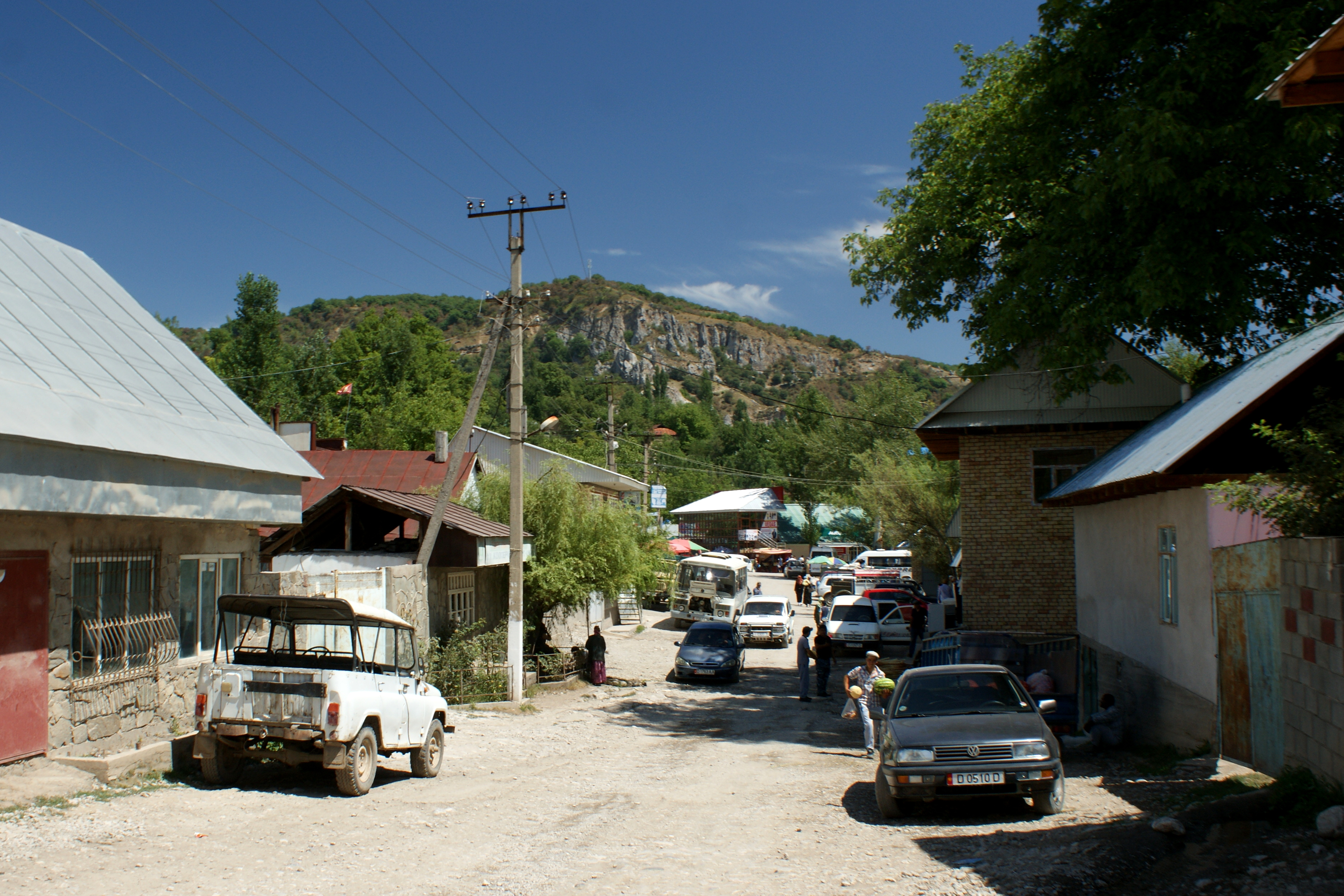
- Main market of Arslanbob

- Location in Kyrgyzstan
- Coordinates: 41°20′N 72°56′E
- Country: Kyrgyzstan
- Region: Jalal-Abad
- District: Bazar-Korgon
- Elevation: 1,600 m (5,200 ft)

Population (2021)
  - Total: 11,291
- Time zone: UTC+6

Arslanbob (Kyrgyz: Арсланбоб) is a village in the Jalal-Abad Region of Kyrgyzstan. Kyrgyzstan's first known export to Europe was the Arslanbob walnut.

The population of Arslanbob was 15,196 in 2021.

== Etymology ==
Arslanbob is named after an 11th-century figure, Arslanbob-Ata (alternate: Arstanbap-Ata). The suffix -bob (or -bab) is a traditional practice used in the village, which denotes 'traveler' or 'explorer'.

== History ==
According to legend, Alexander the Great took the walnuts from the forest of Arslanbob, and these formed the European plantations. For this reason, the walnut is known as the Greek nut in Russian. Scientific research however shows that the walnut forests around Arslanbob are probably around 1000 years old, and were planted. This corresponds with another local story, that says the forest was planted under the leadership of Arystanbop, who founded the village in his name, and died around 1120 CE.

Historical population
Year	Pop.	±% p.a.
2009	11,291	—
2021	15,196	+2.51%
Note: resident population; Sources:

== Geography ==
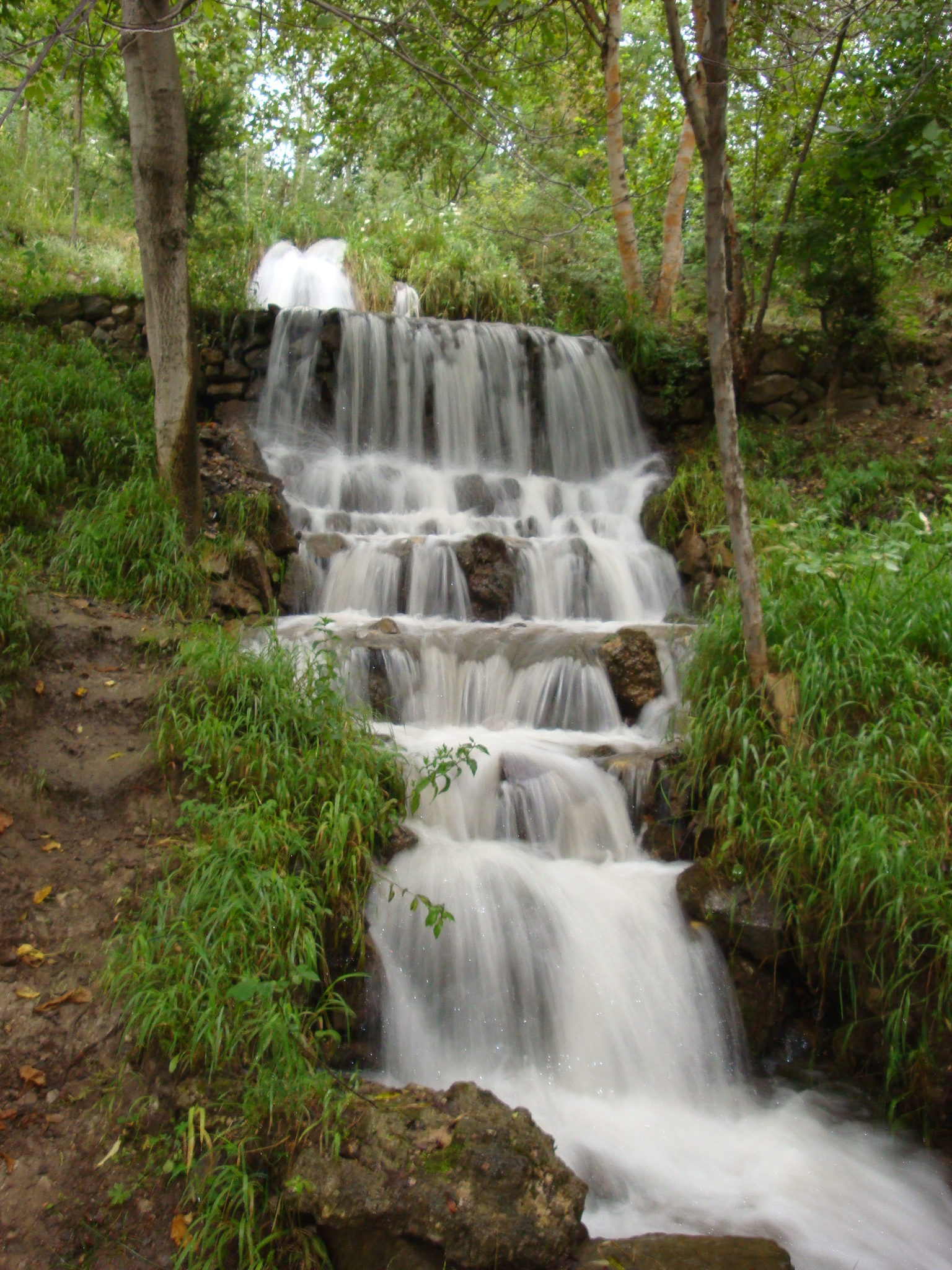
Artificial waterfall near Arslanbob.

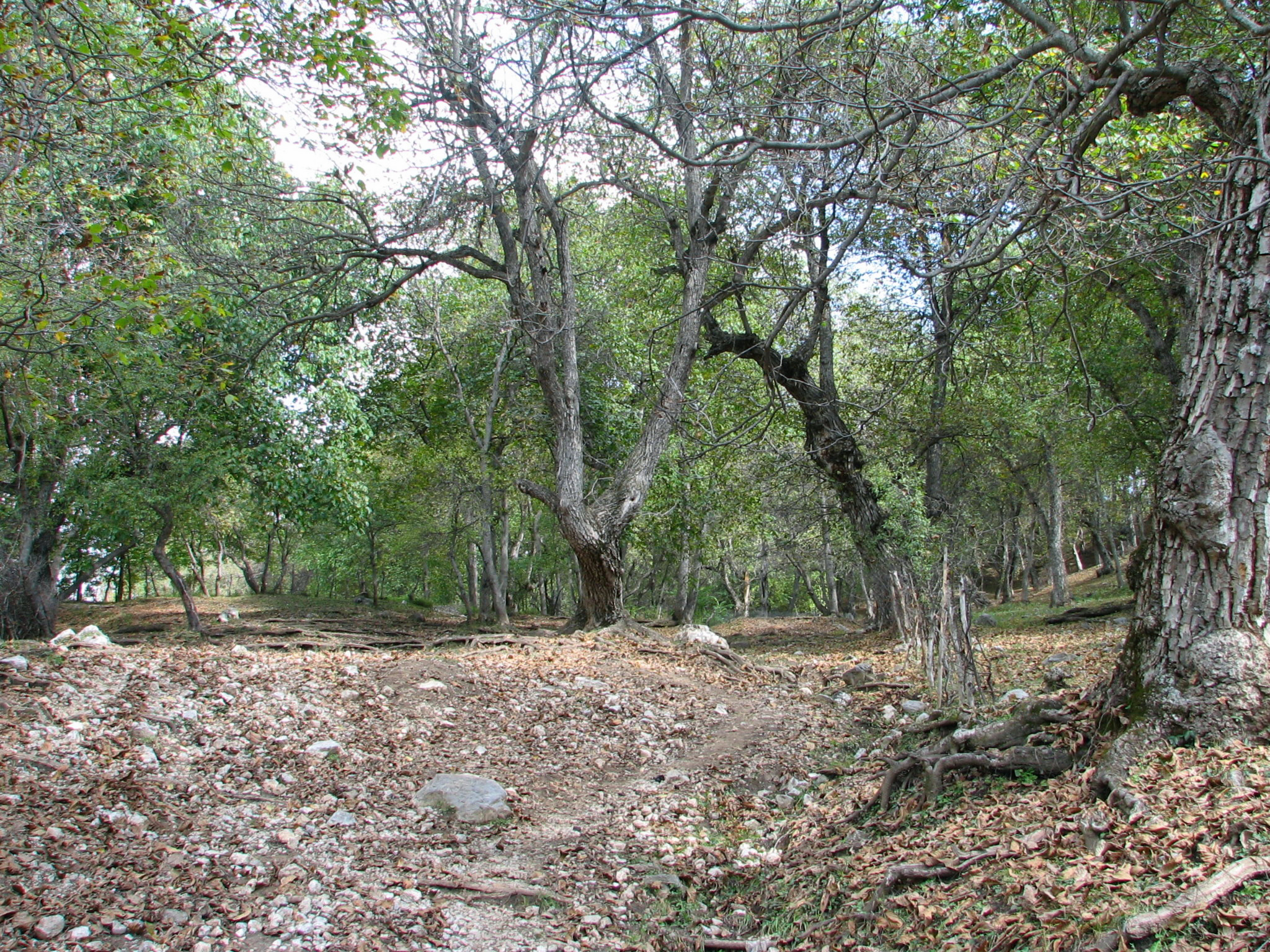
Walnut forest in Arslanbob

Arslanbob is reached from Jalal-Abad via Bazar-Korgon. Kyzyl-Üngkür is 15 kilometres (9.3 mi) away, reachable via Oogon-Talaa, which is situated in the Kara-Üngkür valley.

The walnut forest is within the 60,000 hectares (150,000 acres) forest situated between the Fergana and Chatkal Mountains. The walnut forest is located at altitudes varying between 1,500 metres (4,900 ft) and 2,000 metres (6,600 ft) above sea level on the Fergana range's south-facing slopes. At 11,000 hectares (27,000 acres), the Arslanbob woodland is the largest walnut grove on Earth.

Behind the town of Arslanbob are the Babash-Ata Mountains. There are two waterfalls nearby. One measures 80 metres (260 ft) high and has a slippery scree slope; it is situated in a cliff face north of the village. Another, to the east, is 23 metres (75 ft) in height and has two prayer caves, one of which is known as the Cave of the 40 Angels. Within walking distance is the Dashman Forest Reserve, another walnut forest.

== Flora and fauna ==
Flora

The main issues threatening the forest are cattle grazing and haymaking, but collecting nuts, hunting, gathering firewood and timber, as well as climate change all reduce the ability of the forest to regenerate.

World Conservation Union (IUCN) held a workshop in September 1995 at Arslanbob to specifically discuss "an exceptional botanical garden" of walnut fruit trees found in Kyrgyzstan distributed over the two large forest ranges of Arslanbob Kugart and Khoja Ata running east–west, which in the past covered an area of 630,900 hectares (1,559,000 acres). However, over the decades of exploitation, the area under walnut trees was reduced. These forests are dense and large with particular species composition that have high economic value. Subsequent to World War II, in 1945, an experimental forest research station was reorganized at Arslanbob under the jurisdiction of the Forest Institute of the Academy of Sciences of the then USSR. The research was aimed at the establishment of commercial walnut plantations and maximizing production of fruit, valuable timber and other forest plantations. Reports indicated good results of walnut-fruit cultivation as a result of the joint research efforts.

Various wild forms of other fruit-bearing species including apple (Malus siversiana), pear (Pyrus korshinsky), and plum (Prunus sogdiana).

Fauna

Raccoons were introduced into the Arslanbob forest, now inhabiting an area of about 12,000–15,000 hectares (30,000–37,000 acres) in the western part of Achinsk district in Jalal-Abad Region.

== Culture ==
A shrine (tomb) to Ibn Abbas, now in ruins, is near the forest. The 16th century mazar (shrine or tomb) to Arslanbob-Ata is near the center of the village. A new brick building, painted white, surrounds it and was built in the 20th century. The entrance to this tomb is made of a walnut wood door frame and decorated with ram's horns. There is also a new mosque adjoining the tomb which has an impressive ceiling. The center of the tariqat of the indigenous Sufi order of the Hairy Ishans, and offshoot of Yasawiya is in the city of Arslanbob.

Legends

A legend has it that a disciple of Prophet Mohamed, on a voyage in search of a heavenly place on earth, found such a place in a scenic valley in Kyrgyzstan. However, as the place lacked any kind of vegetation, he appraised Prophet Mohamed of the situation. The Prophet Mohamed then sent him seeds of many trees to plant there which included walnut. The disciple, Arslanbob, then went up a mountain and scattered the seeds which grew into a garden of trees which he tended. Because of this association with the Prophet Mohamed, Muslims consider this place as sacred. According to local legend, it is said that Arslanbob-Ata's wife "betrayed" him to his enemies which resulted in his death. It is also stated that his footprints, hand prints and bloodstains are also seen here.

Other legends include that Alexander the Great planted the first walnut trees in Arslanbob; and that he carried several sacks of walnuts with him which he had used to pay boatmen to ferry his troops.

Another legend attributes walnut distribution to the Silk Road.

== Economy ==
The economic activity of the town centers around the walnut. In the walnut season, which lasts for one month during September, the villagers of Arslanbob and other neighboring villages engage themselves in collecting the nut. For this purpose, they hire a small plot of land for a fee on a five-year lease from the Forest Department. They collect the nuts, fruits and the wood. It is also an occasion of social rejoicing. Walnuts are priced high as they are a source of "oil, protein, anti-oxidants and omega 3 fatty acids." The walnut has served as barter trade in exchange for essential services. The barter practice is still observed in some cases in the villages here to pay fees to the teacher or to travel by bus.

Other crops include maize, potatoes and sunflowers.

== Tourism ==
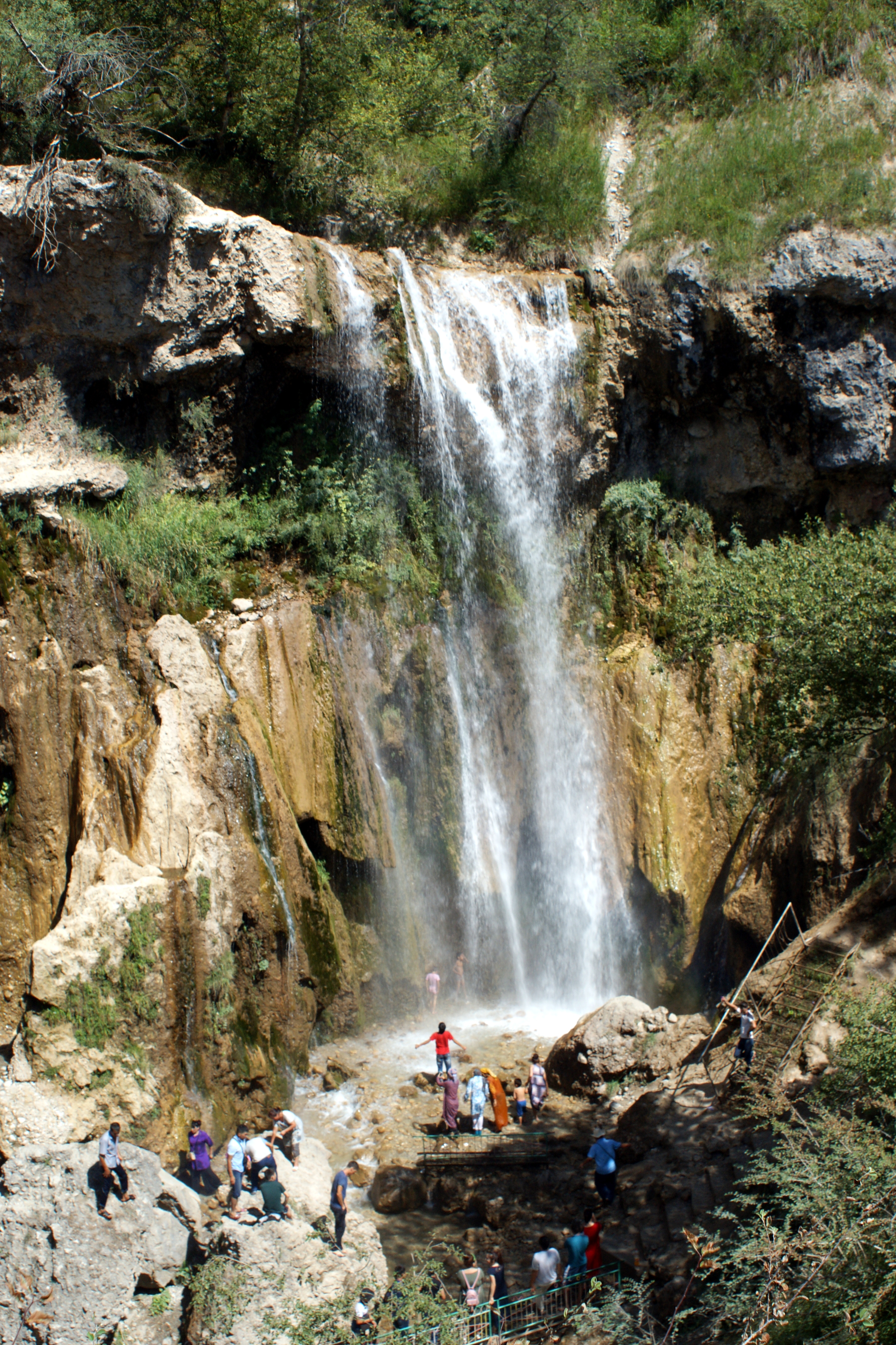
The smaller of two waterfalls in Arslanbob

Tourism is being developed in and around the Arslanbob city. While trekking is a fairly well established activity to the nearby hills and valleys, skiing as an adventure sport is under initial stages of development near the Jailoos mountains. Visiting the walnut wood land by walking through the village up to the red cliffs is also a popular tourist attraction during the season.

There are two water falls which are frequented by visitors seeking holy blessings, magical and spiritual powers. The area around the falls is adorned with prayer flags and wish rags; one was frequented by a holy woman.
