= Baymunduz =

Baymunduz Баймундуз
- Village
- Location in Kyrgyzstan
- Coordinates: 41°02′43″N 72°49′17″E
- Country: Kyrgyzstan
- Region: Jalal-Abad Region
- District: Bazar-Korgon District

Population
  - Total: 3,921

Baymunduz (Kyrgyz: Баймундуз, before 2004: Интернационал Internatsional) is a village in Jalal-Abad Region, Kyrgyzstan. It is part of the Bazar-Korgon District. Its population was 3,921 in 2021.
