= Jangy-Akman =

Jangy-Akman Жаңы-Акман
- Location within Kyrgyzstan
- Coordinates: 41°00′40″N 72°48′50″E
- Country: Kyrgyzstan
- Region: Jalal-Abad
- District: Bazar-Korgon
- Elevation: 716 m (2,349 ft)

Population (2021)
  - Total: 3,789
- Time zone: UTC+6

Jangy-Akman is a village in Jalal-Abad Region of Kyrgyzstan. It is part of the Bazar-Korgon District. Its population was 3,789 in 2021.
