= Dashman Nature Reserve =

Nature reserve in Kyrgyzstan

- IUCN category Ia (strict nature reserve)
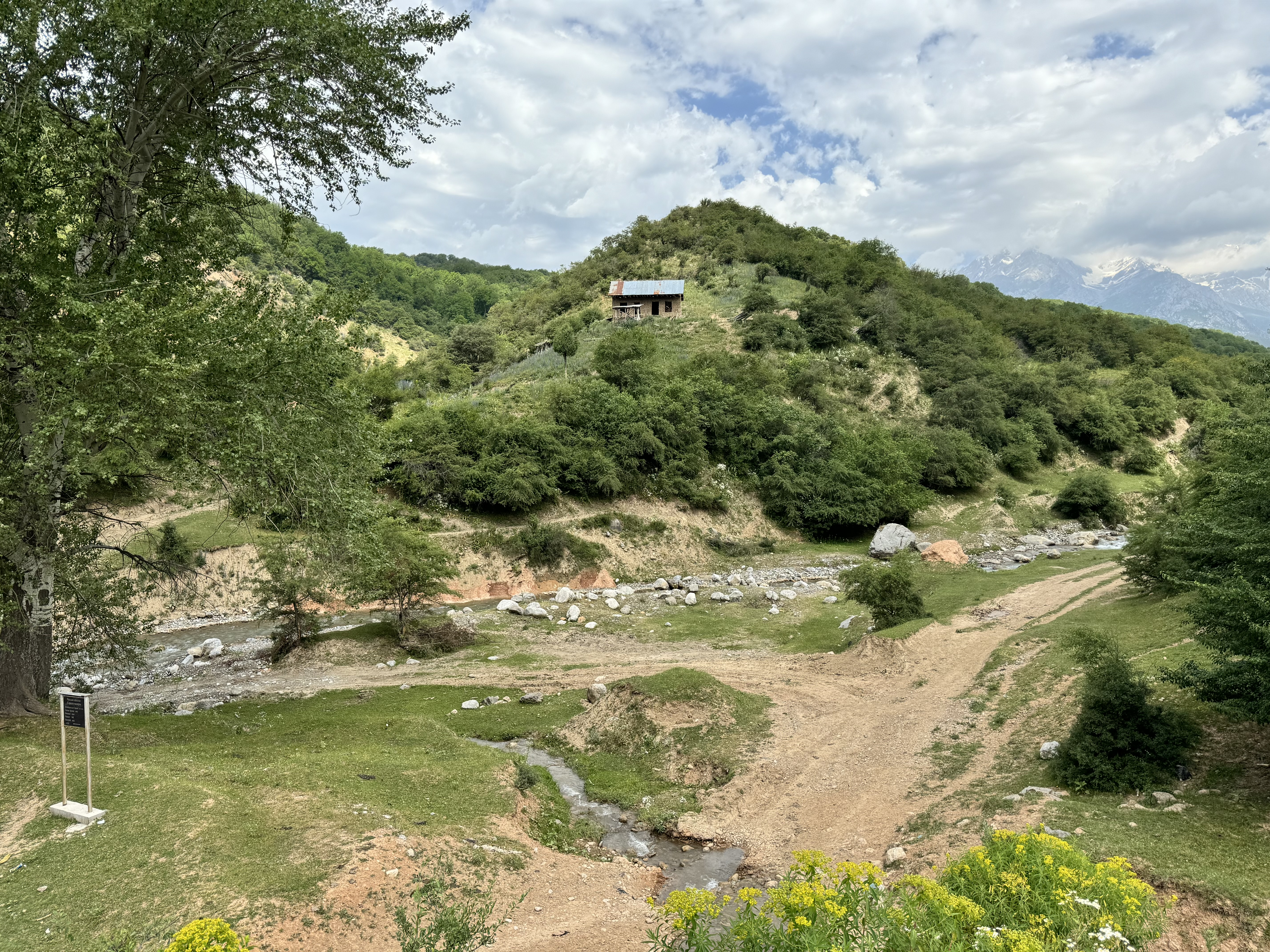

- Location within Kyrgyzstan
- Location: Bazar-Korgon District, Jalal-Abad Region, Kyrgyzstan
- Nearest city: Arstanbap
- Coordinates: 41°20′N 73°01′E
- Area: 7,958 ha (19,660 acres)
- Established: 1975

The Dashman Nature Reserve (Kyrgyz: Дашман мамлекеттик жаратылыш коругу, Russian: Дашманский государственный природный заповедник) is located in Bazar-Korgon District of Jalal-Abad Region of Kyrgyzstan. It was established in 1975 as a forest reserve with a purpose of conservation of natural forests composed of walnut trees (Juglans regia), apple trees (Malus spp), alycha (Prunus divaricata) and other species. It was converted to a stricter nature reserve in 2012. The nature reserve occupies 7,958 hectares (19,660 acres). It lies within the Arstanbap rural community.
