= Shydyr =

Shydyr Шыдыр
- Location within Kyrgyzstan
- Coordinates: 41°6′40″N 72°43′20″E
- Country: Kyrgyzstan
- Region: Jalal-Abad
- District: Bazar-Korgon
- Elevation: 787 m (2,582 ft)

Population (2021)
  - Total: 2,533
- Time zone: UTC+6

Shydyr is a village in Jalal-Abad Region of Kyrgyzstan. It is part of the Bazar-Korgon District. Its population was 2,533 in 2021.
