= Beshik-Jon =

Beshik-Jon Бешик-Жон
- Location within Kyrgyzstan
- Coordinates: 41°02′40″N 72°47′40″E
- Country: Kyrgyzstan
- Region: Jalal-Abad
- District: Bazar-Korgon

Population (2021)
  - Total: 5,342
- Time zone: UTC+6

Beshik-Jon (Kyrgyz: Бешик-Жон) is a village in Jalal-Abad Region of Kyrgyzstan. It is part of the Bazar-Korgon District. Its population was 5,342 in 2021.

== Population ==
Historical population
Year	Pop.	±% p.a.
2009	4,373	—
2021	5,342	+1.68%
Note: resident population; Sources:
