= Chkalov, Kyrgyzstan =

Chkalov Чкалов
- Location within Kyrgyzstan
- Coordinates: 41°12′50″N 72°57′0″E
- Country: Kyrgyzstan
- Region: Jalal-Abad
- District: Bazar-Korgon
- Elevation: 817 m (2,680 ft)

Population (2021)
  - Total: 1,489
- Time zone: UTC+6

Chkalov (Kyrgyz: Чкалов) is a village in Jalal-Abad Region of Kyrgyzstan. It is part of the Bazar-Korgon District. Its population was 1,489 in 2021.
