= Tash-Bulak, Bazar-Korgon =

Tash-Bulak
- Location within Kyrgyzstan
- Coordinates: 41°9′36″N 72°55′48″E
- Country: Kyrgyzstan
- Region: Jalal-Abad
- District: Bazar-Korgon
- Elevation: 1,273 m (4,177 ft)

Population (2021)
  - Total: 707
- Time zone: UTC+6

Tash-Bulak is a village in Jalal-Abad Region of Kyrgyzstan. It is part of the Bazar-Korgon District. Its population was 707 in 2021.
