= Kolot, Kyrgyzstan =

Kolot
- Location within Kyrgyzstan
- Coordinates: 40°59′0″N 72°46′30″E
- Country: Kyrgyzstan
- Region: Jalal-Abad
- District: Bazar-Korgon
- Elevation: 684 m (2,244 ft)

Population (2021)
  - Total: 2,668
- Time zone: UTC+6

Kolot is a village in Jalal-Abad Region of Kyrgyzstan. It is part of the Bazar-Korgon District. Its population was 2,668 in 2021.
