= Beget =

To beget means in English 'to sire (a child)', 'to cause or produce' through reproduction.

Beget may refer to:

- Bögöt, Kyrgyzstan, a village in Kyrgyzstan
- Beget, Spain, a village in the Province of Girona, Spain

== See also ==
- Becket
