= Kyzyl-Ay =

Kyzyl-Ay Кызыл-Ай
- Location within Kyrgyzstan
- Coordinates: 40°59′50″N 72°41′20″E
- Country: Kyrgyzstan
- Region: Jalal-Abad
- District: Bazar-Korgon

Population (2021)
  - Total: 5,846
- Time zone: UTC+6

Kyzyl-Ay (Kyrgyz: Кызыл-Ай) is a village in Jalal-Abad Region of Kyrgyzstan. It is part of the Bazar-Korgon District. Its population was 5,846 in 2021.

== Population ==
Historical population
Year	Pop.	±% p.a.
2009	4,591	—
2021	5,846	+2.03%
Note: resident population; Sources:
