= Aral, Nooken =

Aral Арал
- Location within Kyrgyzstan
- Coordinates: 40°59′20″N 72°38′20″E
- Country: Kyrgyzstan
- Region: Jalal-Abad Region
- District: Nooken District
- Elevation: 660 m (2,170 ft)

Population (2021)
  - Total: 1,896
- Time zone: UTC+6

Aral is a village in Jalal-Abad Region of Kyrgyzstan. It is part of Nooken District. Its population was 1,896 in 2021.
