= Alash =

Alash may be a transliteration from various Turkic languages into English of the following terms:

- "Alash", the second name for the Kazakhs and the national motto of the Kazakhs
  - Alash Autonomy (1917-1920), unrecognized state
  - Alash Orda, Kazakh government of the Alash Autonomy (1917-1920)
  - Alash National Patriotic Party, party in Kazakhstan
  - Alash (party), Kazakh democratic political party (1917-1920)
- Alash, Kyrgyzstan a village
- Alash (river), a tributary of the Khemchik in Tuva
  - Alash (ensemble), a throat singing group from Tuva
