= Besh-Aral Nature Reserve =

Nature reserve in Kyrgyzstan

- IUCN category Ia (strict nature reserve)
- Location within Kyrgyzstan
- Location: Chatkal District, Jalal-Abad Region, Kyrgyzstan
- Coordinates: 41°36′N 70°29′E
- Area: 1,124.63 km^{2} (434.22 sq mi)
- Established: 1979

Besh-Aral Nature Reserve (Kyrgyz: Беш-Арал мамлекеттик коругу, Russian: Беш-Аральский государственный заповедник) is a nature reserve in Chatkal District, Jalal-Abad Region, western Kyrgyzstan. It is located on the northwestern slope of the Chatkal Range, in the basin of the Ters, and lies at an altitude of 950 to 2,300 meters above sea level. The reserve was established in 1979 with the aim of protecting many rare and endangered animals of Western Tien Shan, especially the Menzbier's marmot, which is listed in the IUCN Red List of Threatened Species. The reserve currently covers an area of 112,463 hectares. This is a mountainous region with untouched wild landscapes, turbulent rivers, vast meadows, and great biodiversity.

== History ==
Besh-Aral Nature Reserve was established on March 21, 1979, to preserve the unique natural complex and forests of the Chatkal valley, as well as to protect the habitat of the Menzbier's Marmot and to protect the natural habitat of vegetation of Greig's and Kaufmann's tulips. The area of the reserve amounted to 116,700 hectares. In 1994, in regard with the establishment of Chatkal Forestry the boundaries of the reserve were changed and area reduced to 63,200 hectares (Government Decree No 573 of August 1, 1994). On July 16, 2002, the habitats of Menzbir's marmot (Marmota menzbieri) and other areas were re-subordinated to the nature reserve, and its area increased to 86,748 hectares (Government Decree No 499 of July 26, 2002). In 2006, extension of the Besh-Aral State Nature Reserve with the Chandalash game reserve area increased the area with 25,715 hectares.

== Landscapes ==
The landscape features include semi-desert and dry steppe zones (up to 2,500 m elevation), shrub-meadow steppe, sparse juniper forests, subalpine (2,000–3,500 m), and alpine meadows, as well as glacial-nival zones. The territory of the reserve also includes savanna-like and broad-leaved steppe landscapes and various grassy meadows. Forests and sparse woodland cover about 30,000 hectares.

== Ecology ==
=== Flora ===
There are about 300 species of plants in the reserve, 30 of which are rare or endangered. In the meadows, dominant species include wild onion (Allium), shashyr (possibly Ferula), and others. Tulips, shybak, Pskem onion, chekende, kyzylot, and kymyzdyk also grow here. Tree species include juniper and pine (in Karatoko). Among shrubs: pistachio, and in the floodplains of the Chatkal River and its tributaries — poplar, willow, birch, barberry, rosehip, tabylgy (local name for Spiraea or Cotoneaster), izirik, hawthorn, shylby, yrgai, sea buckthorn, and others. In the lower (western) part of the valley are walnut, apple, cherry, and wild pear groves. Mountain slopes are covered by feather grass, akkylkan, and other steppe vegetation.

=== Fauna ===
The reserve is rich in wildlife. It is home to foxes, argali sheep, mountain goats, deer, lynx, black marmot, red wolf, brown bear, beaver, snow leopard, marten, ermine, and sable. Among birds are the golden eagle, upland buzzard, falcon, saker falcon, and bearded vulture.
