= Sary-Kamysh, Jalal-Abad =

Sary-Kamysh Сары-Камыш
- Location within Kyrgyzstan
- Coordinates: 41°19′50″N 72°15′50″E
- Country: Kyrgyzstan
- Region: Jalal-Abad Region
- District: Nooken District

Population (2021)
  - Total: 48
- Time zone: UTC+6

Sary-Kamysh is a village in Jalal-Abad Region of Kyrgyzstan, near the town Tashkömür. It is part of Nooken District. Its population was 48 in 2021.
