= Khajir-Abad =

Khajir-Abad Хажир-Абад
- Location within Kyrgyzstan
- Coordinates: 40°56′40″N 72°37′0″E
- Country: Kyrgyzstan
- Region: Jalal-Abad
- District: Bazar-Korgon

Population (2021)
  - Total: 3,317
- Time zone: UTC+6

Khajir-Abad is a village in Jalal-Abad Region of Kyrgyzstan. It is part of the Bazar-Korgon District. Its population was 3,317 in 2021.
