= Chek, Bazar-Korgon =

Chek
- Location within Kyrgyzstan
- Coordinates: 40°55′10″N 72°35′10″E
- Country: Kyrgyzstan
- Region: Jalal-Abad
- District: Bazar-Korgon
- Elevation: 639 m (2,096 ft)

Population (2021)
  - Total: 1,178
- Time zone: UTC+6

Chek is a village in Jalal-Abad Region of Kyrgyzstan. It is part of the Bazar-Korgon District. Its population was 1,178 in 2021.
