= Alma, Kyrgyzstan =

Alma
- Location within Kyrgyzstan
- Coordinates: 41°5′30″N 72°41′0″E
- Country: Kyrgyzstan
- Region: Jalal-Abad Region
- District: Nooken District

Population (2021)
  - Total: 3,154
- Time zone: UTC+6

Alma is a village in Jalal-Abad Region of Kyrgyzstan. It is part of Nooken District. Its population was 3,154 in 2021.
