= Chychkan Game Reserve =

Protected area in Kyrgyzstan

- IUCN category IV (habitat/species management area)
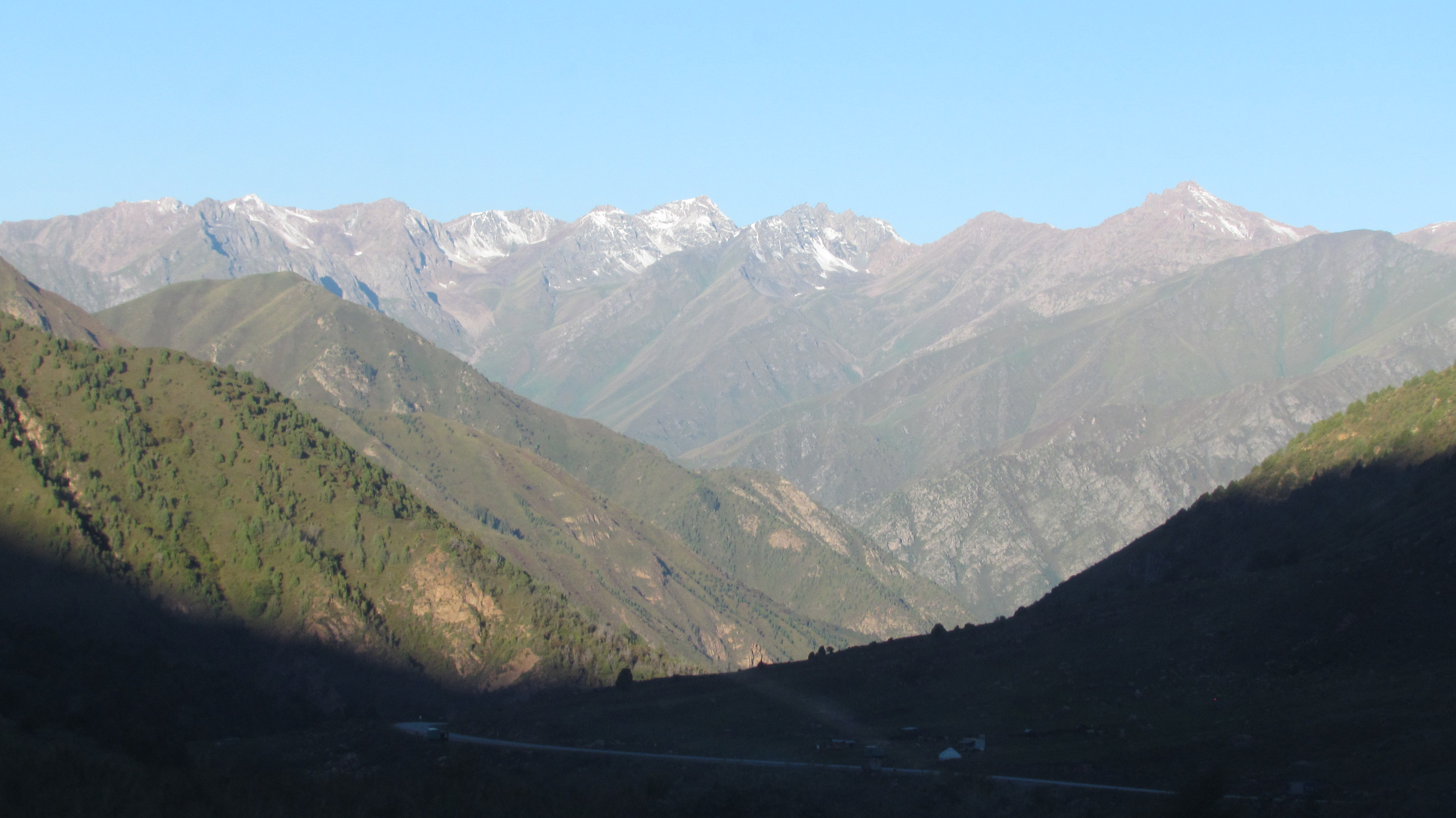

- Location within Kyrgyzstan
- Location: Toktogul District, Kyrgyzstan
- Nearest city: Toktogul
- Coordinates: 42°04′N 72°47′E
- Area: 36,000 ha (89,000 acres)
- Established: 1974

Chychkan Game Reserve (Kyrgyz: Чычкан зоологиялык (аң уулоочу) заказниги) is a protected area in Toktogul District, Jalal-Abad Region, Kyrgyzstan. Established in 1973, it covers 36,000 hectares.
