= Kosh-Tektir Botanical Reserve =

Tulip Garden

- IUCN category IV (habitat/species management area)
- Location within Kyrgyzstan
- Location: Ala-Buka District, Jalal-Abad Region, Kyrgyzstan
- Coordinates: 41°21′N 71°05′E
- Area: 30 ha (74 acres)
- Established: 1975

The Kosh-Tektir Botanical Reserve (Kyrgyz: Кош-Тектир ботаникалык заказниги) is located in Ala-Buka District of Jalal-Abad Region of Kyrgyzstan. It was established in 1975 with a purpose of conservation of the key habitat of the Chatkal Yellow Tulip (Tulipa anadroma Botschantz.) - the most beautiful species of yellow-flowering tulips growing in Kyrgyzstan. The botanical reserve occupies 30 hectares.
