= Ketmen-Töbö =

Ketmen-Töbö Кетмен-Төбө
- Urban-type settlement
- Location within Kyrgyzstan
- Coordinates: 41°37′55″N 72°41′0″E
- Country: Kyrgyzstan
- Region: Jalal-Abad Region
- Alekseevka: 1905
- Elevation: 803 m (2,635 ft)

Population (2021)
  - Total: 2,080
- Time zone: UTC+6

Ketmen-Töbö (Kyrgyz: Кетмен-Төбө) is an urban-type settlement in Jalal-Abad Region of Kyrgyzstan. It is reported that the settlement was established as Alekseevka on own authority of political suspects from Krasnoyarsk of the Russian Empire in 1905. It was recognized by the authorities only in 5-6 years, and the permit to settle was granted. In 1912-1914 the settlement amounted to 124 households. Administratively, it is part of the city of Kara-Köl. Its population was 2,080 in 2021.

== Population ==
Historical population
Year	Pop.	±% p.a.
1999	2,029	—
2009	1,901	−0.65%
2021	2,080	+0.75%
Note: resident population; Sources:
