= Toskool =

Toskool Тоскоол
- Location within Kyrgyzstan
- Coordinates: 41°12′10″N 72°41′30″E
- Country: Kyrgyzstan
- Region: Jalal-Abad Region
- District: Nooken District

Population (2021)
  - Total: 2,180
- Time zone: UTC+6

Toskool is a village in Jalal-Abad Region of Kyrgyzstan. It is part of Nooken District. Its population was 2,180 in 2021.
