= Kuru-Köl Forest Reserve =

Forest reserve in Kyrgyzstan

- IUCN category IV (habitat/species management area)
- Location within Kyrgyzstan
- Location: Ala-Buka District, Jalal-Abad Region, Kyrgyzstan
- Coordinates: 41°36′N 71°22′E
- Area: 348 ha (860 acres)
- Established: 1975

The Kuru-Köl Forest Reserve (Kyrgyz: Куру-Көл токой заказниги, also Курукол Kurukol) is located in the Ala-Buka rural community, Ala-Buka District, Jalal-Abad Region, Kyrgyzstan. It was established in 1975 with a purpose of conservation of Schrenk's Spruce (Picea schrenkiana). Among other trees growing in the forest reserve are wild ash, maple, hawthorn, barberry, etc. The forest reserve occupies 348 hectares.
