= Kapka Tash Lake =

Lake in Kyrgyzstan

Kapkatash Lake (Kapkatash Kölü)
- Location in Kyrgyzstan Kapkatash Lake (Kapkatash Kölü) (Asia)
- Location: Toktogul District, Jalal-Abad Region, Kyrgyzstan
- Coordinates: 41°31′19″N 73°19′56″E
- Lake type: Dammed lake
- Primary inflows: Seven streams
- Primary outflows: Karasuu Lake
- Basin countries: Kyrgyzstan
- Max. length: 1.5 km (0.93 mi)
- Max. width: 0.7 km (0.43 mi)
- Surface area: 0.96 km^{2} (0.37 sq mi)
- Average depth: 50 m (160 ft)
- Max. depth: 50 m (160 ft)
- Water volume: 2.6×10^{6} m^{3} (92×10^{6} cu ft)
- Surface elevation: 2,305 m (7,562 ft)

Kapkatash Lake or Kapka-Tash Lake (Kyrgyz: Капкаташ көлү) is a dammed lake in Toktogul District, Jalal-Abad Region, Kyrgyzstan. It lies in the Kapkatash valley, between Kengkol and Taktalyk in the northwestern spurs of the Fergana Range, at an elevation of 2,305 m (7,562 ft) above sea level.

The lake has an area of 0.96 km^{2} (0.37 sq mi), a volume of 2.6×10^{6} m^{3} (92×10^{6} cu ft), and a depth of 50 m (160 ft). Its water transparency is about 3 m (9.8 ft). Seven streams flow into the lake, and its outflow feeds Kara-Suu Lake.
