= Karacha =

- Location within Kyrgyzstan
- Coordinates: 41°5′0″N 72°48′30″E
- Country: Kyrgyzstan
- Region: Jalal-Abad
- District: Bazar-Korgon
- Elevation: 803 m (2,635 ft)

Population (2021)
  - Total: 3,586
- Time zone: UTC+6

Karacha is a village in Jalal-Abad Region of Kyrgyzstan. It is part of the Bazar-Korgon District. Its population was 3,586 in 2021.
