= Kyzyl-Oktyabr, Jalal-Abad =

Kyzyl-Oktyabr Кызыл-Октябрь
- Location within Kyrgyzstan
- Coordinates: 41°6′10″N 72°47′20″E
- Country: Kyrgyzstan
- Region: Jalal-Abad
- District: Bazar-Korgon
- Elevation: 870 m (2,850 ft)

Population (2021)
  - Total: 3,641
- Time zone: UTC+6

Kyzyl-Oktyabr is a village in Jalal-Abad Region of Kyrgyzstan. It is part of the Bazar-Korgon District. Its population was 3,641 in 2021.
