= Baltyr-Khan Forest Reserve =

- IUCN category IV (habitat/species management area)
- Location within Kyrgyzstan
- Location: Aksy District, Jalal-Abad Region, Kyrgyzstan
- Coordinates: 41°48′N 71°50′E
- Area: 304 ha (750 acres)
- Established: 1975

The Baltyr-Khan Forest Reserve (Kyrgyz: Балтыр-Хан токой заказниги, also Балтыркан Baltyrkan, Russian: Лесной заказник Батраханский) is located in the Avletim rural community, Aksy District, Jalal-Abad Region, Kyrgyzstan. Established in 1975, it covers 304 hectares. Its purpose is conservation of Siberian Fir (Abies sibirica var. semenovii). Among other trees growing in the forest reserve are Schrenk's Spruce (Picea schrenkiana subsp. tianshanica), Persian walnut (Juglans regia), maple (Acer tataricum ssp. semenovii), wild apple (Malus sieversii), etc.
