= Kara-Jygach Rocks =

Natural Monument in Kyrgyzstan

- IUCN category III (natural monument or feature)
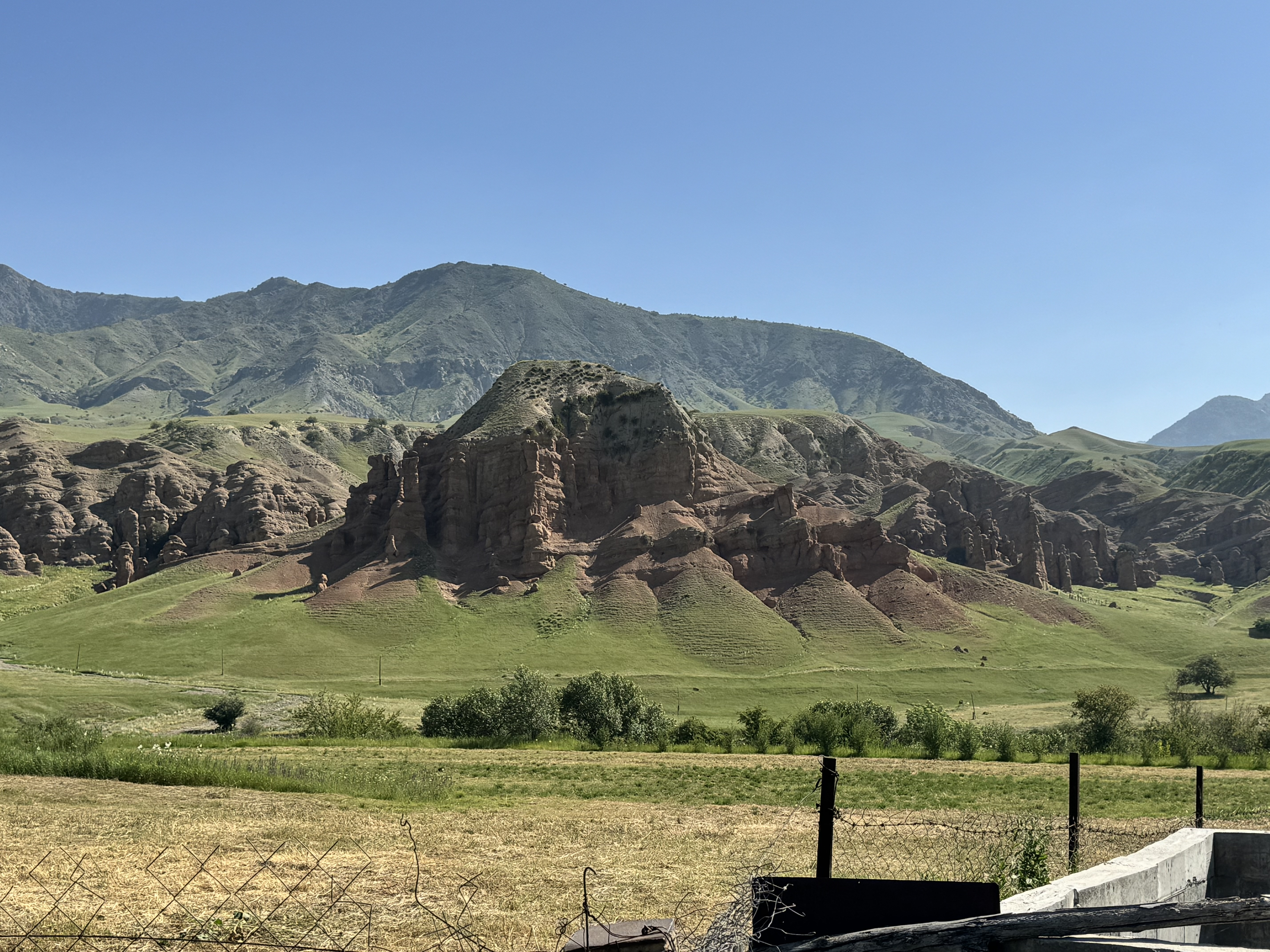

- Location within Kyrgyzstan
- Location: Aksy District, Jalal-Abad Region, Kyrgyzstan
- Coordinates: 41.619°N 72.101°E
- Established: 1975

The Kara-Jygach Rocks (Kyrgyz: Кара-Жыгач аскалары) is a nature monument located in Aksy District of Jalal-Abad Region of Kyrgyzstan. The outstanding feature of the monument is its striking series of numerous cliffs and pillars of red sandstone, which were formed as a result of wind erosion. In 1975, the monument was declared a geological protected area. The rocks are situated on the left bank of the river Kara-Suu, near the village Jangy-Jol. They reach up to 50 m height, and stretch over a distance of 1 km.
