= Birinchi May, Jalal-Abad =

Birinchi May Биринчи Май
- Location within Kyrgyzstan
- Coordinates: 41°05′30″N 72°45′50″E
- Country: Kyrgyzstan
- Region: Jalal-Abad
- District: Bazar-Korgon

Population (2021)
  - Total: 5,518
- Time zone: UTC+6

Birinchi May (Kyrgyz: Биринчи Май, Russian: Первое Мая, romanized: Pervoye Maya) is a village in Jalal-Abad Region of Kyrgyzstan. It is part of the Bazar-Korgon District. Its population was 5,518 in 2021.

== Population ==
Historical population
Year	Pop.	±% p.a.
2009	4,022	—
2021	5,518	+2.67%
Note: resident population; Sources:
