= Padysha-Ata Nature Reserve =

Nature reserve in Kyrgyzstan

Padysha-Ata State Nature Reserve
- Gorge in Padysha-Ata State Nature Reserve
- Location: Aksy District, Jalal-Abad Region, Kyrgyzstan
- Coordinates: 41°43′28″N 71°34′42″E
- Area: 15,846 ha (39,160 acres)
- Established: 3 July 2003
- Location in Kyrgyzstan

Padysha-Ata State Nature Reserve (Kyrgyz: Падыша-Ата мамлекеттик коругу, Russian: Падышатинский государственный природный заповедник) is a nature reserve in Aksy District, Jalal-Abad Region, Kyrgyzstan, in the central part of the Chatkal Range in the western Tian Shan. It was established on 3 July 2003 to protect juniper forests, Semenov's fir and the area's biodiversity. It forms part of the Western Tien-Shan World Heritage Site, inscribed in 2016.

== Historical and cultural background ==
The area contains the Padysha-Ata mazar, a pilgrimage site. The Western Tien-Shan nomination dossier dates the shrine to the sixth–seventh centuries.

Before the establishment of the reserve, the area's forests were managed for timber and nut harvesting. The Western Tien-Shan nomination dossier reports extensive felling of coniferous trees during the 1930s and 1940s.

== History and conservation ==
The reserve was established by Government Resolution No. 405 on land belonging to the Padysha-Ata forestry district of the Avletim forestry enterprise. The resolution designated 15,846 ha (39,160 acres) as the reserve and established a separate protective zone of 14,714 ha (36,360 acres).

UNESCO lists the Padysha-Ata component of the Western Tien-Shan World Heritage Site as covering 16,010.6 ha (39,563 acres), with a buffer zone of 14,545.8 ha (35,943 acres).

Padysha-Ata is included in a landscape conservation initiative involving the Chatkal ecological corridor, intended to connect it with Sary-Chelek Nature Reserve and Alatay Nature Park and facilitate wildlife movement.

In September 2025, the Ilbirs Foundation provided 23 camera traps to support wildlife monitoring and conservation in the reserve.

== Geography ==
The reserve lies in the basin of the Padysha-Ata River, which flows from the Muztor ridge. Smaller rivers include the Kashka-Suu, Olzhoke, Kaman-Arka and Zhylandy. The Padysha-Ata waterfall is situated in the Minzhylky valley.

== Climate ==
The Padysha-Ata hydrometeorological station records a mean January temperature of −3.4 °C (25.9 °F) and a mean July temperature above 18.6 °C (65.5 °F). Annual precipitation at an elevation of 1,530 m (5,020 ft) is reported as 356 mm (14.0 in), with about 90% falling between February and July. Snow cover lasts approximately three months.

== Flora and fauna ==
Vegetation includes spruce-fir, juniper and small-leaved forests, subalpine and alpine meadows, and tall-grass communities. Trees include Schrenk's spruce (Picea schrenkiana), Semenov's fir, junipers and walnut (Juglans regia). Plants listed in the Red Data Book of Kyrgyzstan include Semenov's fir, Sievers' apple (Malus sieversii), Niedzwetzky's apple (Malus niedzwetzkyana), Sorbus persica and Tulipa anadroma. The two apple species occur mainly in the buffer zone.

A 2022 UNDP publication lists 78 bird species and 32 mammal species in the reserve. Mammals include the snow leopard, Eurasian lynx, brown bear, Siberian ibex, Siberian roe deer, wild boar and Indian crested porcupine. Birds include the black stork, golden eagle, saker falcon, cinereous vulture and bearded vulture. Fish, amphibians and reptiles remain poorly studied.

== Gallery ==
Padysha-Ata River

Spring in the reserve

Raspberries in the reserve

Globe thistle in the reserve
