= Jel-Tiybes Botanical Reserve =

- IUCN category IV (habitat/species management area)
- Location within Kyrgyzstan
- Location: Kyrgyzstan
- Nearest city: Tash-Kömür
- Coordinates: 41°30′N 72°08′E
- Area: 800 ha (2,000 acres)
- Established: 1975

Jel-Tiybes Botanical Reserve (Kyrgyz: Жел-Тийбес ботаникалык заказниги) is a reserve located in Aksy District of Jalal-Abad Region of Kyrgyzstan to the northwest of Tash-Kömür. Its purpose is to conserve a reference section of semi-desert. Sporadic bushes of Caragana and pistachio grow in the area. Established in 1975, the reserve occupies 800 hectares.
