= Miskin-Say Forest Reserve =

- IUCN category IV (habitat/species management area)
- Location within Kyrgyzstan
- Location: Ala-Buka District, Jalal-Abad Region, Kyrgyzstan
- Coordinates: 41°38′N 71°23′E
- Area: 483 ha (1,190 acres)
- Established: 1975

The Miskin-Say Forest Reserve (Kyrgyz: Мискин-Сай токой заказниги, also Мескинсай Meskinsay) is located in the Ala-Buka rural community, Ala-Buka District, Jalal-Abad Region, Kyrgyzstan. It was established in 1975 with a purpose of conservation of the largest spruce forest in Ala-Buka District. The forest reserve occupies 483 hectares.
