= Uzun-Akmat Forest Reserve =

Protected area in Kyrgyzstan

- IUCN category IV (habitat/species management area)
- Location within Kyrgyzstan
- Location: Toktogul District, Jalal-Abad Region, Kyrgyzstan
- Coordinates: 42°06′N 72°12′E
- Area: 14,771 ha (36,500 acres)
- Established: 1992

The Uzun-Akmat Forest Reserve (Kyrgyz: Узун-Акмат токой заказниги) is located in the Cholpon-Ata rural community, Toktogul District, Jalal-Abad Region, Kyrgyzstan. It was established in 1992, with a purpose of conservation of rare and endangered flora species including Greig's tulip, Semenov's Fir, elecampane, and Sorbus persica. The forest reserve occupies 14,771 hectares.

The natural attractions of this reserve include unnamed waterfalls, several caves, the mysterious mountains of Korgonata, alpine lakes, beautiful and rich flora and fauna. This place is a true and peaceful wilderness that is difficult to access.
