= Sary-Jayyk =

Sary-Jayyk Сары-Жайык
- Location within Kyrgyzstan
- Coordinates: 41°09′30″N 72°53′10″E
- Country: Kyrgyzstan
- Region: Jalal-Abad
- District: Bazar-Korgon

Population (2021)
  - Total: 749
- Time zone: UTC+6

Sary-Jayyk (Kyrgyz: Сары-Жайык, formerly Кыргызкаба Kyrgyzkaba or Kirgizgava) is a village in Jalal-Abad Region of Kyrgyzstan. It is part of the Bazar-Korgon District. Its population was 749 in 2021.
