= Kyzyl-Jyldyz, Jalal-Abad =

Kyzyl-Jyldyz Кызыл-Жылдыз
- Location within Kyrgyzstan
- Coordinates: 41°01′40″N 72°31′15″E
- Country: Kyrgyzstan
- Region: Jalal-Abad Region
- District: Nooken District

Population (2021)
  - Total: 802
- Time zone: UTC+6

Kyzyl-Jyldyz is a village in Jalal-Abad Region of Kyrgyzstan. It is part of Nooken District. Its population was 802 in 2021.
