= Kara-Suu Lake =

Lake in Kyrgyzstan

- Location within Kyrgyzstan Location within Asia
- Coordinates: 41°33′28″N 73°15′30″E
- Basin countries: Kyrgyzstan
- Max. length: 6.6 km (4.1 mi)
- Max. width: 1.3 km (0.81 mi)
- Surface area: 4.2 km^{2} (1.6 sq mi)
- Max. depth: 153 m (502 ft)
- Water volume: 223×10^{6} m^{3} (7.9×10^{9} cu ft)
- Surface elevation: 1,998 m (6,555 ft)

Kara-Suu Lake (Kyrgyz: Кара-Суу көлү) is a rock-dammed mountain lake in Toktogul District of Jalal-Abad Province of Kyrgyzstan. It is located at an elevation of 1,998 m (6,555 ft) between the Kengkol and Taktalyk mountains, northwestern spurs of the Fergana Range, at the headwaters of the Karasuu River, a left tributary of the Naryn River. An elevation of 2,022 m (6,634 ft) has also been reported for the lake in other sources. The lake has an area of 4.2 km^{2} (1.6 sq mi), a volume of approximately 223.5×10^{6} m^{3} (7.89×10^{9} cu ft), and a maximum depth of 153 m (502 ft). It was formed when a large landslide blocked an ancient tectonic fracture, creating a natural dam through which water continues to seep. Ten streams flow into the lake, the largest being the outlet from the upstream Kapkatash Lake.

== Geology and formation ==
Karasuu Lake originated when a large landslide dammed an ancient tectonic fault zone following fault displacement. The resulting natural dam impounds the lake waters.

== Hydrology ==
Water from the lake seeps through the landslide dam and re-emerges approximately 280 to 300 m (920 to 980 ft) lower downstream. As a consequence, the lake's water level may fluctuate by up to 20 to 25 m (66 to 82 ft).

== Environmental issues ==
The shoreline meadows are used as seasonal grazing grounds and overnight camps for livestock, mainly cattle. This has led to contamination of the lake by parasitic organisms. According to local reports, fish inhabiting the lake have been affected by disease associated with this contamination.
