= Kan-Achuu Nature Park =

Protected area in Kyrgyzstan

- IUCN category II (national park)
- Location within Kyrgyzstan
- Location: Toguz-Toro District, Jalal-Abad Region, Kyrgyzstan
- Coordinates: 41°29′N 73°39′E
- Area: 30,496.5 ha (75,358 acres)
- Established: 2015

Kan-Achuu Nature Park is in Toguz-Toro District of Jalal-Abad Region of Kyrgyzstan established in September 2015. The purpose of the park is conservation of the unique nature complexes and biodiversity, conservation of rare and endangered flora and fauna species, and extending network of specially protected areas of Kyrgyz Republic. It currently covers 30,496.5 hectares. The park is situated in the eastern spurs of the Fergana Range, in the basin of the rivers Baydamtal, Kan-Achuu and Kökirim.
