= Kara-Köl =

- Flag

- Location within Kyrgyzstan
- Coordinates: 41°37′52″N 72°40′7″E
- Country: Kyrgyzstan
- Region: Jalal-Abad

Area
  - Total: 1,050 km^{2} (410 sq mi)
- Elevation: 930 m (3,050 ft)

Population (2021)
  - Total: 26,901
- Time zone: UTC+6
- Website: karakulgov.kg

Kara-Köl (Kyrgyz: Кара-Көл; Russian: Кара-Куль Kara-Kulʼ) is a city in Jalal-Abad Region of Kyrgyzstan. It is a city of regional significance, not part of a district. Its area is 1,050 square kilometres (410 sq mi), and its resident population was 26,901 in 2021. Kara-Köl consists of the town proper, the urban-type settlement Ketmen-Töbö and the village Jazy-Kechüü.

Located on the river Naryn, downstream (southwest) of the Toktogul Dam, the city was built in the 1960s to house the construction workers for the dam, and granted city status in 1977. Currently, it is home to the staff of the hydroelectric plant. From the reservoir to Tash-Kömür the river flows through a gorge with a series of dams (the 'Lower Naryn Cascade').

The city is on the M41, near the Bishkek-Osh highway.

== Population ==
Historical population
Year	Pop.	±% p.a.
1970	12,453	—
1979	17,080	+3.57%
1989	22,225	+2.67%
1999	21,478	−0.34%
2009	22,502	+0.47%
2021	26,901	+1.50%
Note: resident population; Sources:
