= Mailuu-Suu =

Town in Jalal-Abad Region, Kyrgyzstan

Mailuu-Suu Майлуу-Суу
- Seal

- Location in Kyrgyzstan
- Coordinates: 41°14′45″N 72°26′53″E
- Country: Kyrgyzstan
- Region: Jalal-Abad Region
- City Status: 1946

Area
  - Total: 120 km^{2} (46 sq mi)
- Elevation: 1,300 m (4,300 ft)

Population (2021)
  - Total: 25,892
  - Density: 220/km^{2} (560/sq mi)
- Postal code: 721100
- Area code: (+996) 3744

Mailuu-Suu (Kyrgyz: Майлуу-Суу, Russian: Майли-Сай Mayli-Say) is a mining town in the Jalal-Abad Region of southern Kyrgyzstan. It is a city of regional significance, and is not part of any particular district. Its area is 120 square kilometres (46 sq mi), and its resident population was 25,892 in 2021. It has been economically depressed since the fall of the Soviet Union. From 1946 to 1968 the Zapadnyi Mining and Chemical Combine in Mailuu-Suu mined and processed more than 10,000 short tons (9,100 t) of uranium ore for the Soviet nuclear program. By the early 1990s, uranium markets were facing hardships due to low demand and oversupply, and much of the uranium deposits in Mailuu-Suu had been depleted. These factors left much of the local population without meaningful work. The town was classified as one of the Soviet government's secret cities, officially known only as "Mailbox 200". Mailuu-Suu consists of the town proper, the urban-type settlement Kök-Tash and the villages Sary-Bee, Kögoy and Kara-Jygach.

== Population ==
Historical population
Year	Pop.	±% p.a.
1970	22,963	—
1979	27,424	+1.99%
1989	32,422	+1.69%
1999	23,008	−3.37%
2009	22,853	−0.07%
2021	25,892	+1.05%
Note: resident population; Sources:

== Uranium mills ==
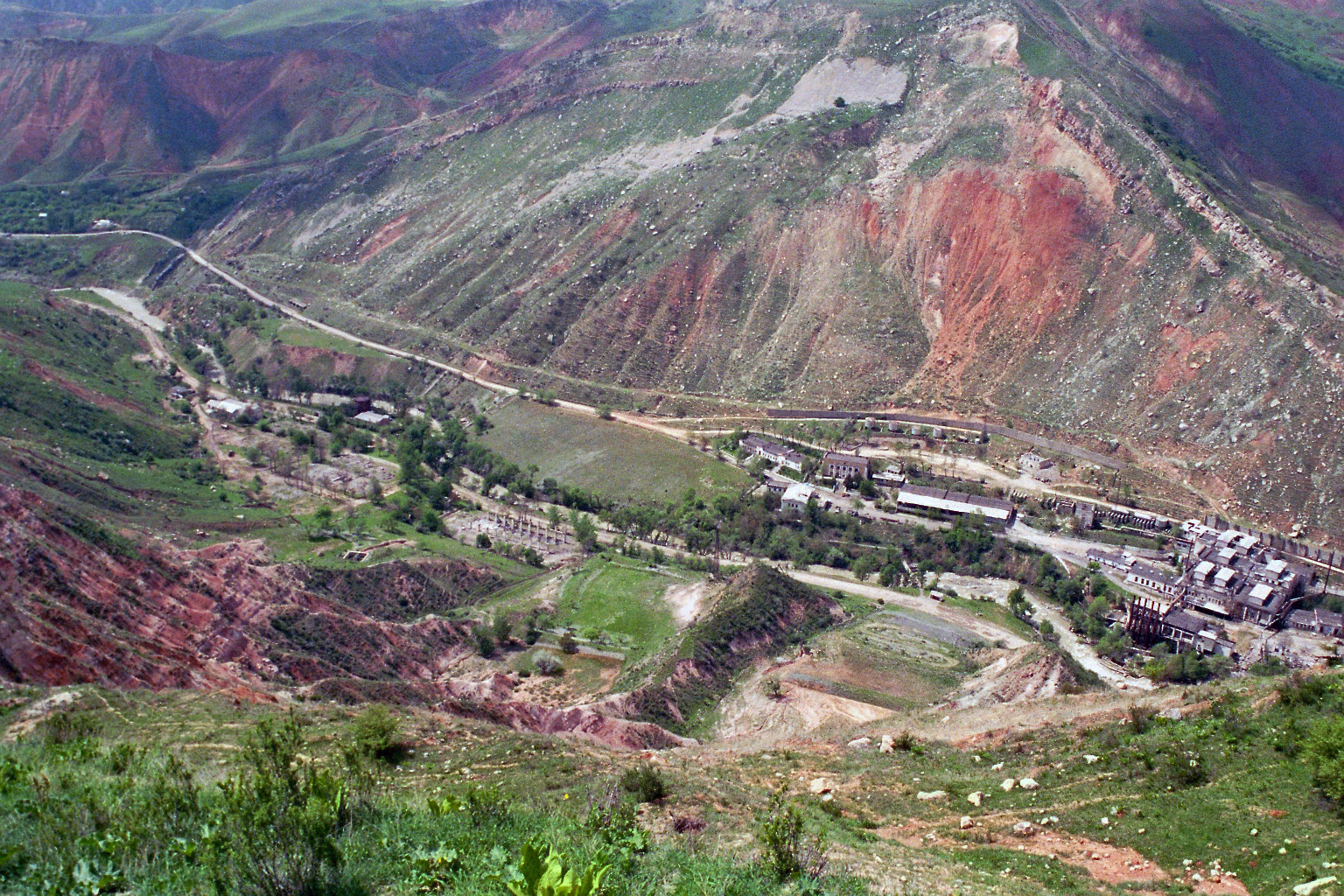
View of Mailuu-Suu uranium tailing sites, 2010

Uranium was initially found in the area in 1933, and in 1946, the uranium deposit opened. By the early 1950s, Mailuu-Suu had produced 10,000 tonnes of uranium oxide.

The USSR left 23 unstable uranium tailings pits on the tectonically unstable hillside above the town. Unsecured uranium tailings on unstable slopes near Mailuu-Suu pose major health and environmental risks due to landslide threats. Radioactive waste on the Mailuu-Suu River also endangers the environment and population of the Fergana Valley. The site's heavily polluted rivers and farmland severely affects the health and economy of communities in both Kyrgyzstan and Uzbekistan. A breached tailings dam in April 1958 released 600,000 cubic metres (21,000,000 cu ft) of radioactive tailings into the river Mailuu-Suu. In 1992, a landslide blocked the river, which flowed over its banks and flooded another waste reservoir. A flood caused by a mudslide nearly submerged a tailings pit in 2002.

Mailuu-Suu is considered to be the most radioactive region in Central Asia, and faces severe environmental challenges. Ranked by the Blacksmith Institute in 2006 as one of the 10 most polluted cities globally, its crisis stems from uranium waste left by decades of mining. In 2014, the Institute reported that adolescents had elevated cancer rates and weakened immune systems. The World Bank approved a US$5 million grant to reclaim the tailings pits in 2004, and approved an additional $1 million grant for the project in 2011. However, grave threats still persist.
