= Nooken District =

Coordinates: 41.0620°N 72.6321°E

Nooken Ноокен району
- District
- Coat of arms

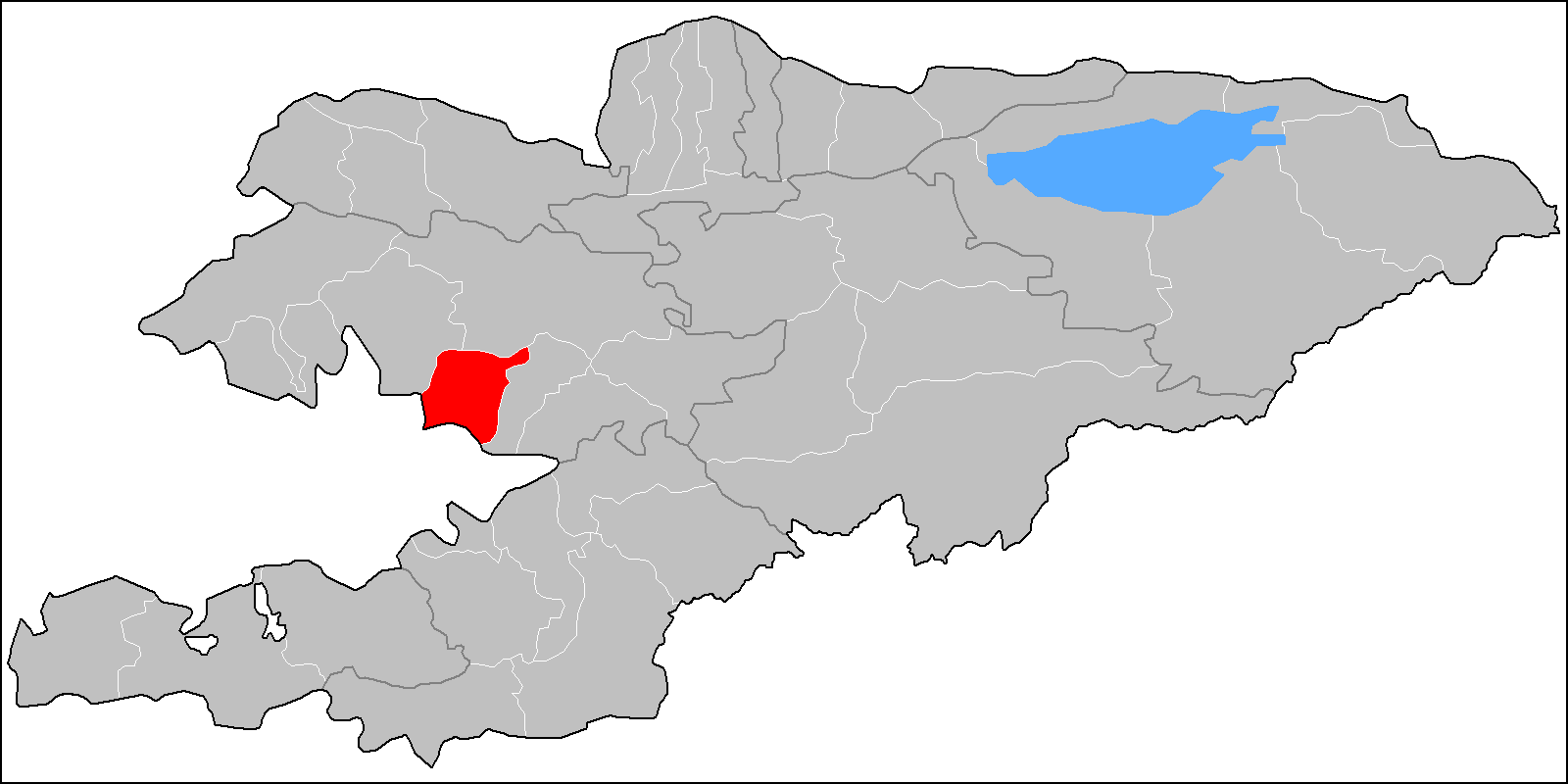
- Country: Kyrgyzstan
- Region: Jalal-Abad Region

Area
  - Total: 2,336 km^{2} (902 sq mi)

Population (2021)
  - Total: 145,187
  - Density: 62.15/km^{2} (161.0/sq mi)
- Time zone: UTC+6 (Kyrgyzstan Time)

Nooken District (Kyrgyz: Ноокен району), known before 1992 as Lenin District, is a district of Jalal-Abad Region in western Kyrgyzstan. The administrative seat lies at Masy. Its area is 2,336 square kilometres (902 sq mi), and its resident population was 145,187 in 2021.

== Population ==
Historical population
| Year | Pop. | ±% p.a. |
|---|---|---|
| 1970 | 54,296 | — |
| 1979 | 63,858 | +1.82% |
| 1989 | 81,515 | +2.47% |
| 1999 | 101,519 | +2.22% |
| 2009 | 117,055 | +1.43% |
| 2021 | 145,187 | +1.81% |
Note: resident population; Sources:

== Towns, rural communities and villages ==
In total, Nooken District includes 1 town and 55 settlements in 8 rural communities (ayyl aymagy). Each rural community can consist of one or several villages. The rural communities and settlements in the Nooken District are:

1. town Kochkor-Ata
2. Aral (seat: Aral; incl. Internatsional, Rassvet, Chertak-Tash and Cheremushki)
3. Bürgöndü (seat: Bürgöndü; incl. Jangy-Aryk, Jengish, Kichi-Bürgöndü, Kokonduk, Kurama, Kyzyl-Kyya, Nooshken and Uuru-Jar)
4. Dostuk (seat: Shamaldy-Say; incl. Dostuk, Kuduk, Kyzyl-Tuu, Sary-Kamysh and Shyng-Say)
5. Masy (seat: Masy; incl. Apyrtan, Besh-Jygach, Bögöt and Kyzyl-Tuu)
6. Mombekov (seat: Mombekov; incl. Boston, Jazgak, Jangy-Kyshtak, Kök-Tash, Kochkor-Ata, Kurulush and Chek)
7. Nooken (seat: Komintern; incl. Kara-Bulak, Kirov, Kurulush, Kyzyl-Jyldyz, Parakanda and Rakhmanjan)
8. Sakaldy (seat: Sakaldy; incl. Arimjan, Böbüy, Kagazdy, Kyzyl-Kyrgyzstan, Chek, Chong-Bagysh and Say-Boyu)
9. Shaydan (seat: Alma; incl. Birdik, Jangy-Aryk, Jon-Aryk, Kök-Ajdar, Toskool and Eski-Masy)

Note: Mayluu-Suu is a town of regional significance of Jalal-Abad Region, and is not part of the Nooken District.

Settlements of the Nooken District.
