= Masy =

Masy Масы
- Village
- Location within Kyrgyzstan
- Coordinates: 41°03′39″N 72°37′58″E
- Country: Kyrgyzstan
- Region: Jalal-Abad
- District: Nooken

Population (2021)
  - Total: 19,774
- Time zone: UTC+6

Masy (Kyrgyz: Масы), previously known since 1937 until 1991 as Leninzhol, is a large village in Jalal-Abad Region, Kyrgyzstan. Its population was 19,774 in 2021. It is the seat of the Masy ayyl aymagy (village community) and Nooken District. The Bishkek - Osh highway passing through Massy goes west to Kochkor-Ata and east to Bazar-Korgon and Jalal-Abad city.

== Population ==
Historical population
Year	Pop.	±% p.a.
2009	13,880	—
2021	19,774	+2.99%
Note: resident population; Sources:
