= Bögöt, Kyrgyzstan =

Bögöt Бөгөт
- Location within Kyrgyzstan
- Coordinates: 41°4′10″N 72°35′40″E
- Country: Kyrgyzstan
- Region: Jalal-Abad Region
- District: Nooken District
- Elevation: 646 m (2,119 ft)

Population (2021)
  - Total: 1,753
- Time zone: UTC+6

Bögöt (Kyrgyz: Бөгөт) is a village in the Jalal-Abad Region of Kyrgyzstan. It is part of the Nooken District. Its population was 1,753 in 2021.
