= Uzbeks in Kyrgyzstan =

Largest minority group in Kyrgyzstan

Qirg'iziston O'zbeklari Қирғизистон Ўзбеклари Узбекхои Киргизистон

Total population
- 1,000,000

Languages
- Uzbek, Russian, Kyrgyz

Religion
- Islam (sunni, hanafi)

Related ethnic groups
- Turkic peoples (Uyghurs, Kyrgyzs, Kazakhs)

Uzbeks are an ethnic group native to Kyrgyzstan, where they are the largest minority group, comprising about 15% of the population. They have a long history in the region and have played a significant role in the culture and economy of Kyrgyzstan. Many Uzbeks in Kyrgyzstan live in the southern part of the country, particularly in the cities of Osh, Jalal-Abad and Özgön.

== See also ==
- Kyrgyzstan–Uzbekistan relations
- Uzbek diaspora
- Ethnic groups in Kyrgyzstan
