= Kök-Tash, Mayluu-Suu =

Kök-Tash Көк-Таш
- Location within Kyrgyzstan
- Coordinates: 41°11′N 72°24′E
- Country: Kyrgyzstan
- Region: Jalal-Abad Region
- City: Mayluu-Suu
- Elevation: 820 m (2,690 ft)

Population (2021)
  - Total: 3,451
- Time zone: UTC+6

Kök-Tash (Kyrgyz: Көк-Таш) is an urban-type settlement in Jalal-Abad Region of Kyrgyzstan. Administratively, it is part of the city Mayluu-Suu. Its population was 3,451 in 2021.

== Population ==
Historical population
Year	Pop.	±% p.a.
1970	2,377	—
1979	2,828	+1.95%
1989	2,793	−0.12%
1999	2,643	−0.55%
2009	2,654	+0.04%
2021	3,451	+2.21%
Note: resident population; Sources:
