= Chandalash Game Reserve =

Wildlife refuge in Kyrgyzstan

- IUCN category IV (habitat/species management area)
- Interactive map of Chandalash Game Reserve
- Location: Kyrgyzstan
- Coordinates: 42°02′N 71°06′E
- Area: 252.7 km^{2} (97.6 sq mi)
- Established: 1975

Chandalash Game Reserve (Kyrgyz: Чандалаш заказниги, also Сандалаш Sandalash) is a wildlife refuge in Kyrgyzstan. Established in 1975, it covers 252.7 km^{2} (97.6 sq mi). It is situated on the upper course of the river Chandalash, in Chatkal District.
