= Bazar-Korgon District =

Coordinates: 41°01′41″N 72°44′37″E

Bazar-Korgon Базар-Коргон району
- District
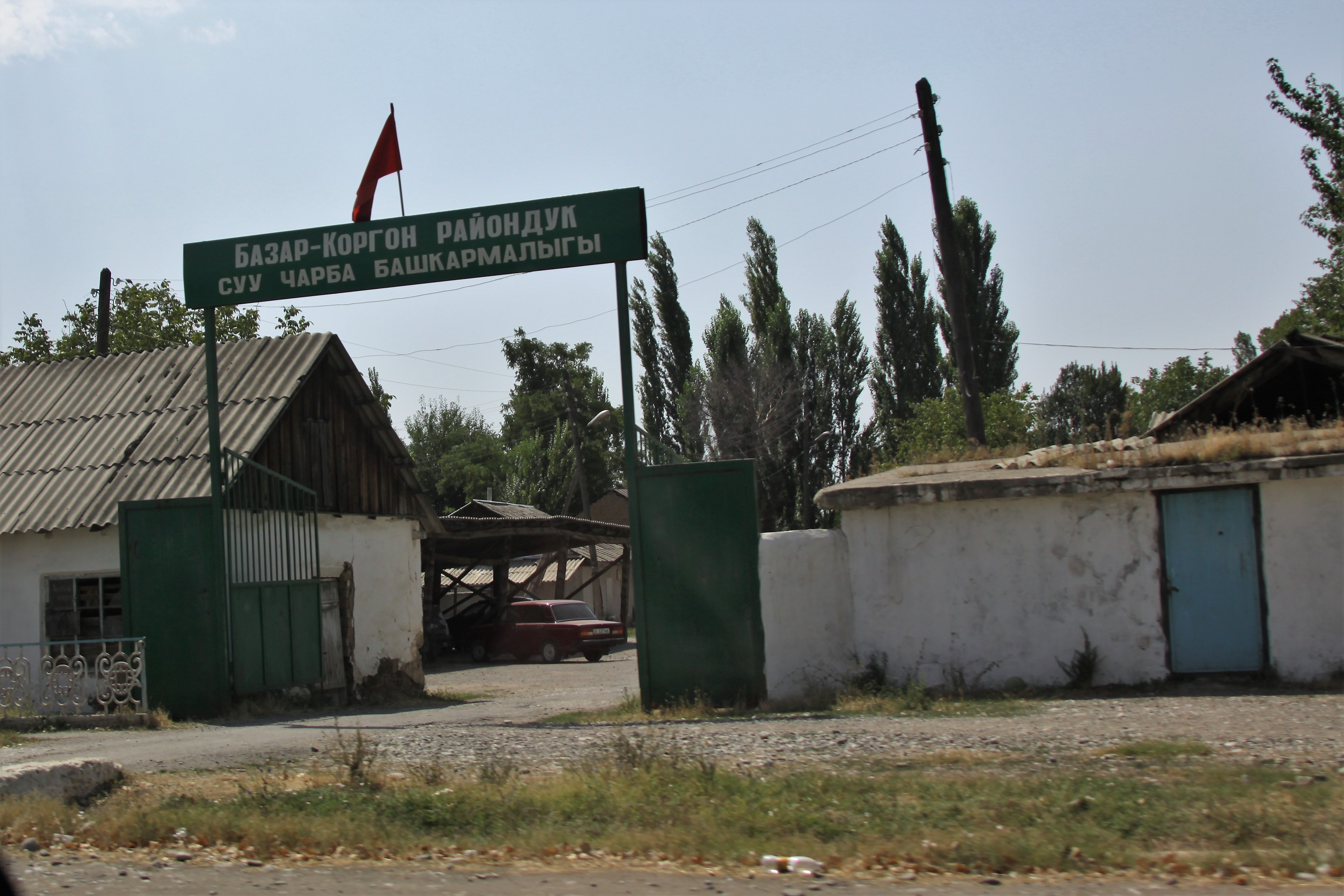

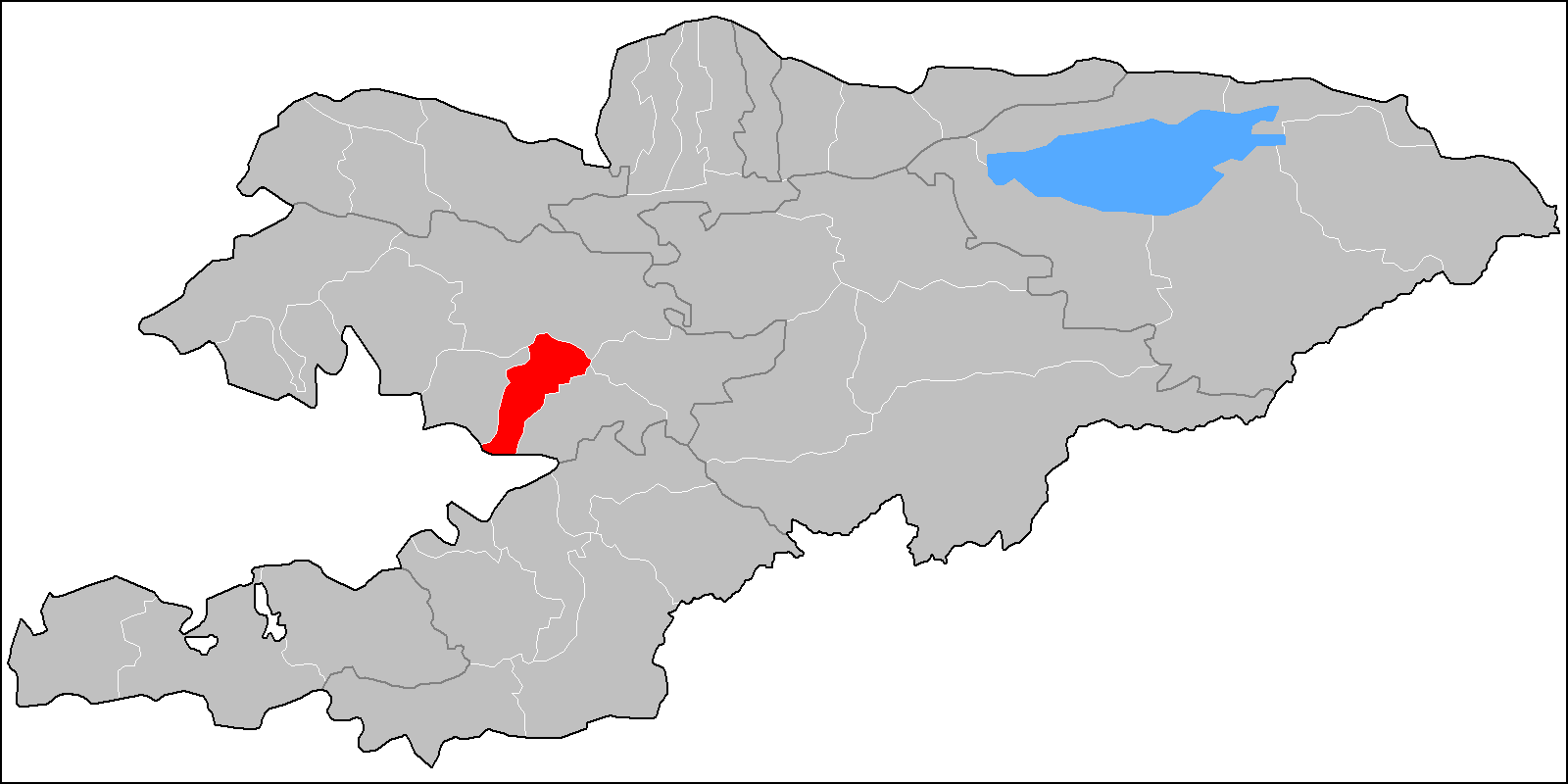
- Country: Kyrgyzstan
- Region: Jalal-Abad

Area
  - Total: 1,965 km^{2} (759 sq mi)

Population (2021)
  - Total: 183,908
  - Density: 93.59/km^{2} (242.4/sq mi)
- Time zone: UTC+6

Bazar-Korgon (Kyrgyz: Базар-Коргон району) is a district of Jalal-Abad Region in western Kyrgyzstan. The seat lies at the town Bazar-Korgon. Its area is 1,965 square kilometres (759 sq mi), and its resident population was 183,908 in 2021.

== Population ==
Historical population
Year	Pop.	±% p.a.
1970	53,496	—
1979	67,357	+2.59%
1989	86,576	+2.54%
1999	119,007	+3.23%
2009	142,951	+1.85%
2021	183,908	+2.12%
Note: resident population; Sources:

== Rural communities and villages ==
In total, Bazar-Korgon District includes 1 town and 62 settlements in 8 rural communities (ayyl aymagy). Each rural community can consist of one or several villages. The rural communities and settlements in the Bazar-Korgon District are:

1. City of Bazar-Korgon
2. Akman (seat: Jangy-Akman; incl. Jarake, Kayyrma, Kolot, Korgon-Jar, Kosh-Korgon and Tash-Bulak)
3. Arstanbap (seat: Arslanbob (Arstanbap); incl. Ak-Terek, Bel-Terek, Gava, Gumkana, Dashman, Jay-Terek and Jaradar)
4. Beshik-Jon (seat: Beshik-Jon; incl. Jon, Baymunduz, Karacha and Kök-Alma)
5. Kengesh (seat: Auk; incl. Kara-Jygach, Kyzyl-Oktyabr, Mogol-Korgon, Birinchi May, Seyitkazy, Shydyr and Kotkor)
6. Kyzyl-Üngkür (seat: Kyzyl-Üngkür; incl. Ak-Bulak, Jaz-Kechüü, Katar-Janggak and Kösö-Terek)
7. Mogol (seat: Oogon-Talaa; incl. Buvakol, Kaynar, Kara-Oy, Kyzyl-Suu, Köktongdu, Charbak and Chkalov)
8. Saydykum (seat: Saydykum; incl. Arkalyk, Jangy-Abad, Jash-Lenin, Tösh, Dukur, Kyrgyz-Kaba, Kyzyl-Ay, Toychubek-Chek, Turpak-Korgon, Khajir-Abad, Chek and Chong-Kurulush)
9. Talduu-Bulak (seat: Kaba; incl. Sary-Jayyk, Katar-Janggak, Ak-Tyt, Üch-Bulak, Ak-Terek, Kök-Alma and Kyrgoo)
Settlements of the Bazar-Korgon District.
