= Bazar-Korgon =

Bazar-Korgon Базар-Коргон
- Town
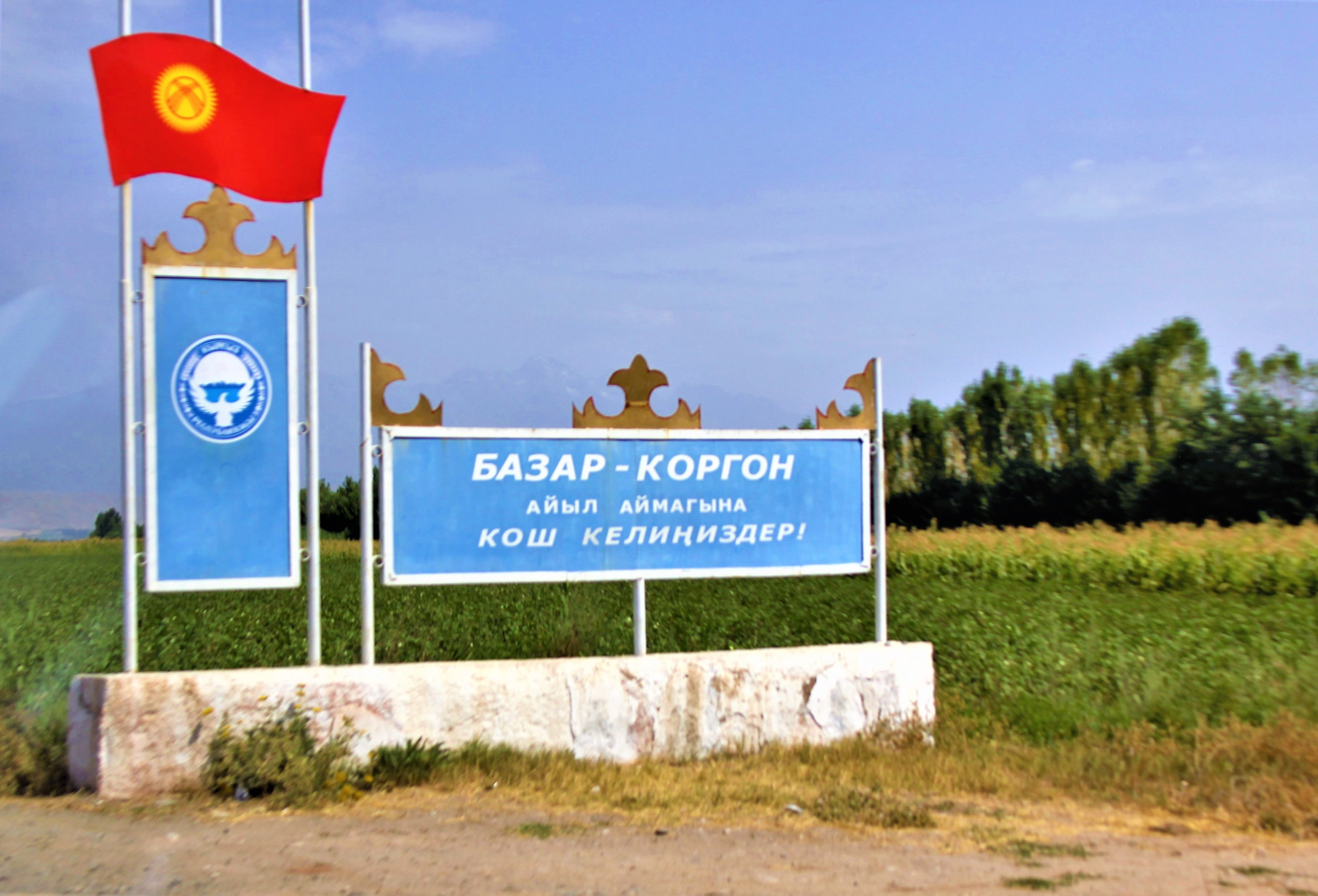

- Location within Kyrgyzstan
- Coordinates: 41°02′30″N 72°44′50″E
- Country: Kyrgyzstan
- Region: Jalal-Abad
- District: Bazar-Korgon
- Town: 2021
- Elevation: 728 m (2,388 ft)

Population (2021)
  - Total: 41,011
- Time zone: UTC+6 (KGT)

Bazar-Korgon (Kyrgyz: Базар-Коргон) is a town in the Jalal-Abad Region of Kyrgyzstan. It was officially established as a city in January 2021. Its population was 41,011 as of 2021, approximately 80% of whom were ethnic Uzbeks.

== Population ==
Historical population
Year	Pop.	±% p.a.
2009	33,359	—
2021	41,011	+1.74%
Note: resident population; Sources:

== Notable people ==
- Azimzhan Askarov
