= Jalal-Abad Region =

Region of Kyrgyzstan

Jalal-Abad Region Жалал-Абад облусу (Kyrgyz) Джалал-Абадская область (Russian)
- Region
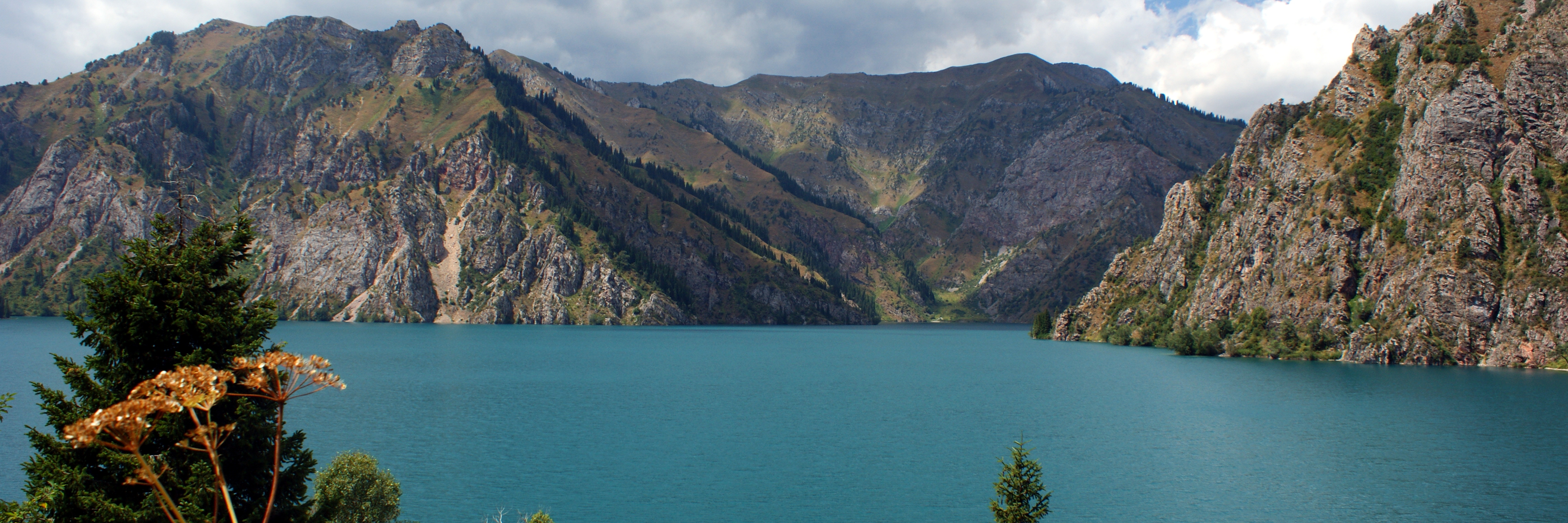
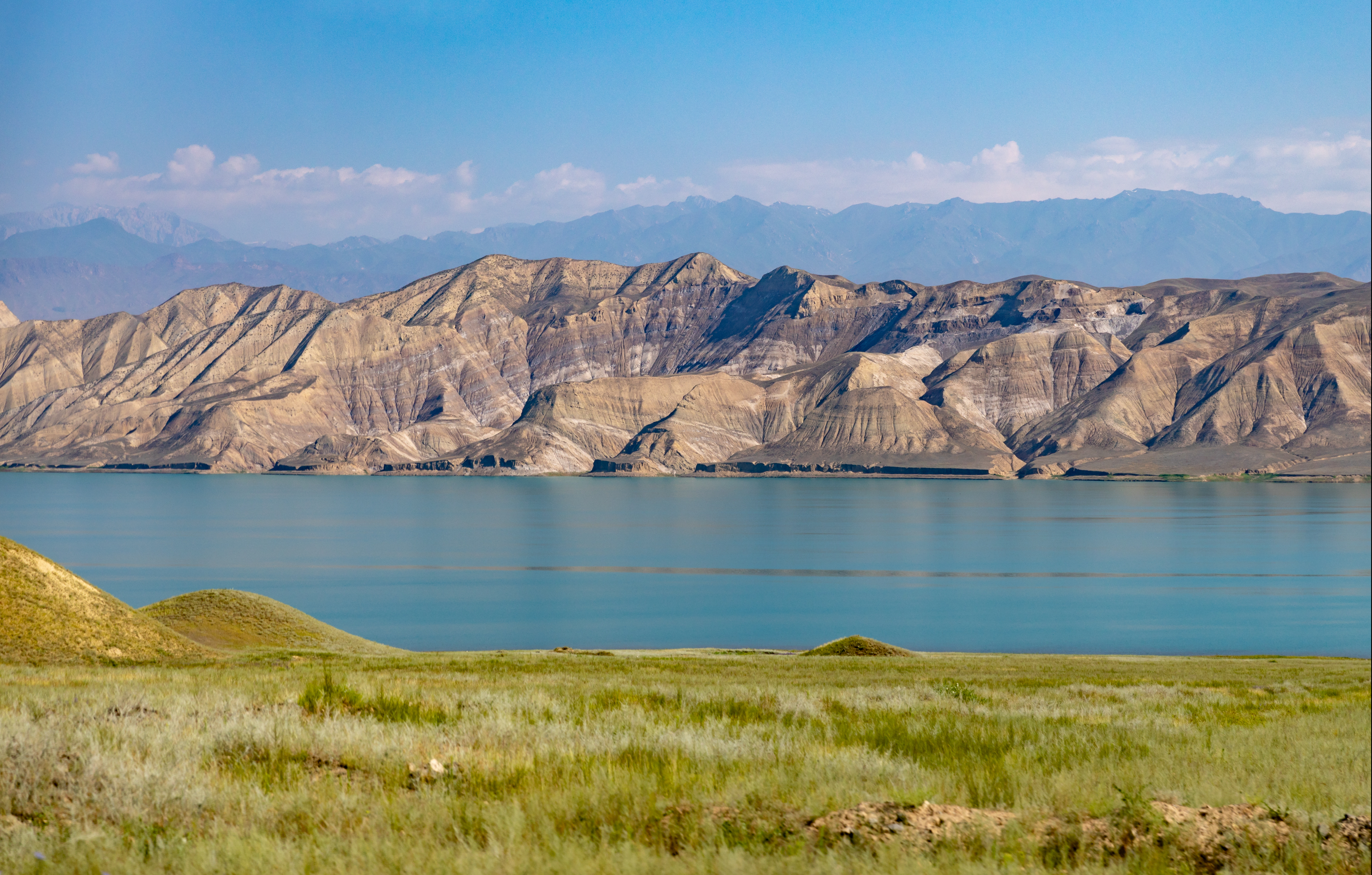
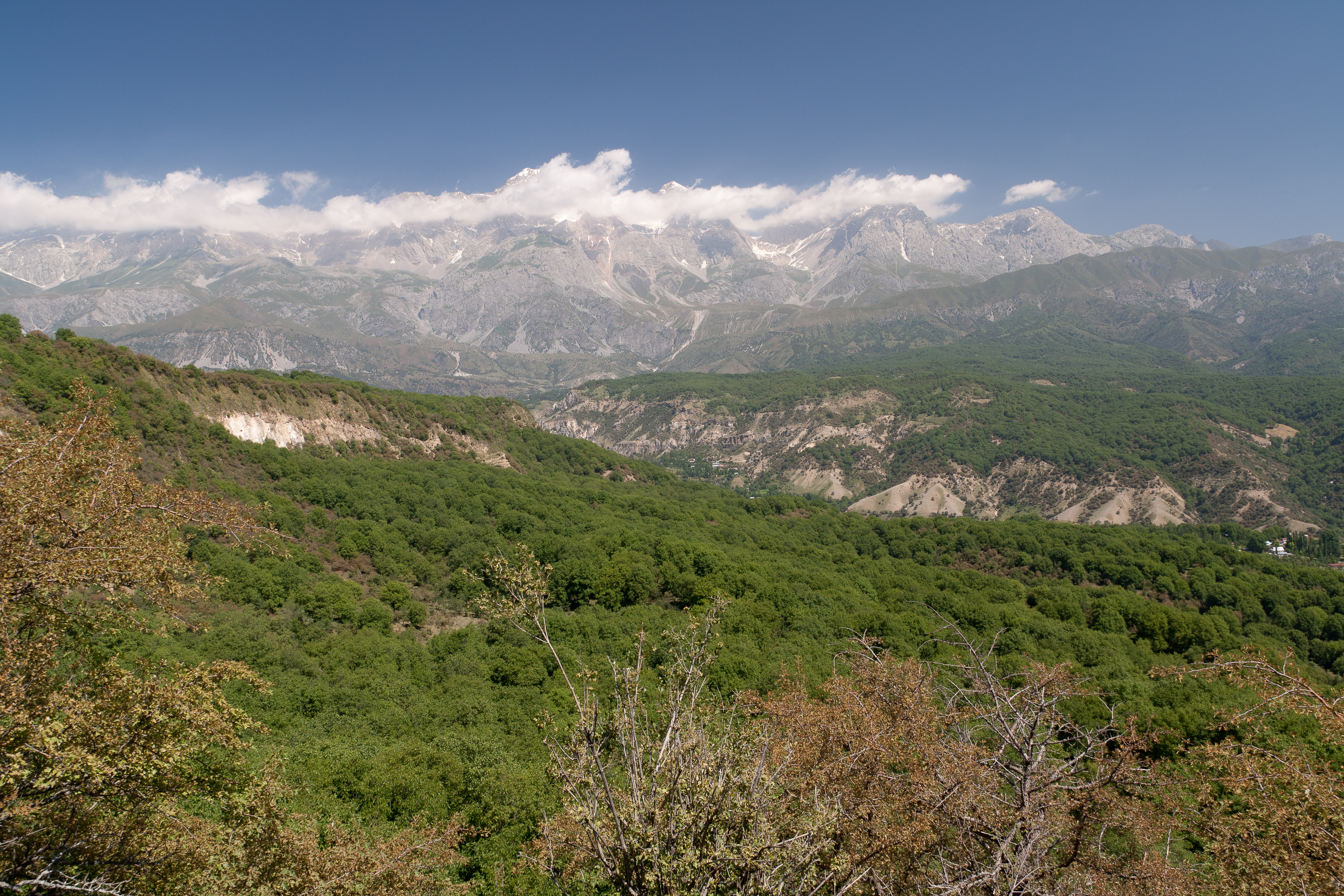
- From the top, Sary-Chelek Lake, Toktogul Reservoir, Walnut Forest

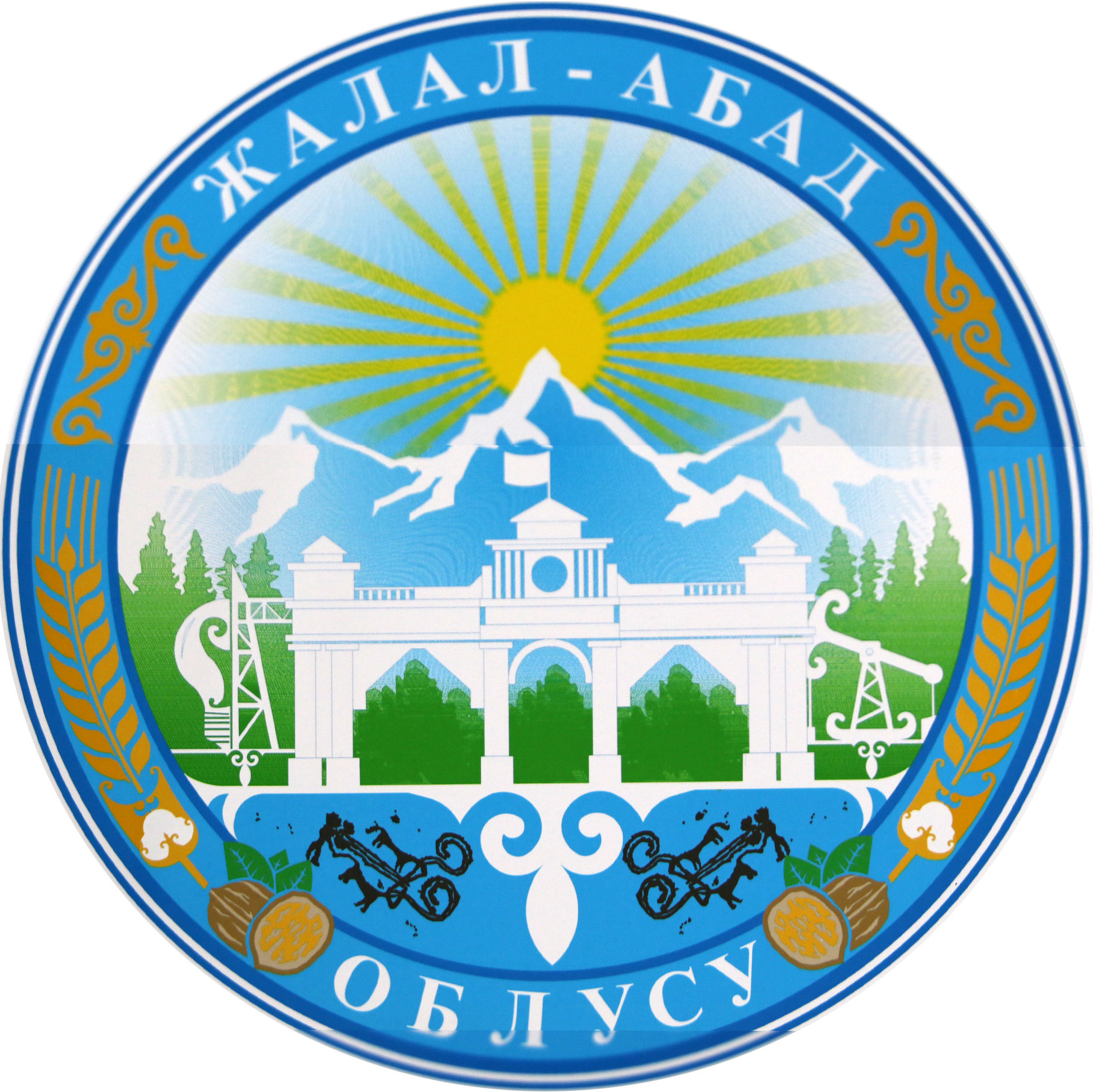
- Flag Coat of arms

- Map of Kyrgyzstan, location of Jalal-Abad Region highlighted
- Coordinates: 41°15′N 72°15′E
- Country: Kyrgyzstan
- Capital: Manas

Government
  - Gubernator: Zhusupbek Sharipov

Area
  - Total: 32,418 km^{2} (12,517 sq mi)

Population (2023-01-01)
  - Total: 1,311,007
  - Density: 40.441/km^{2} (104.74/sq mi)
- Time zone: UTC+6 (Kyrgyzstan Time)
- ISO 3166 code: KG-J
- Districts: 8
- Cities: 9
- Towns: 4
- Villages: 415

Jalal-Abad (/dʒəˈlɑːl əˈbɑːd/; Kyrgyz: [dʒɑˌɫɑɫɑˈbɑt]) is a region (oblus) of Kyrgyzstan. Its capital is Manas. It is surrounded by (clockwise from the north) Talas Region, Chüy Region, Naryn Region, Osh Region, and Uzbekistan. Jalal-Abad Region was established on 21 November 1939. On 27 January 1959 it became a part of Osh Region, but regained its old status as a region on 14 December 1990. Its total area is 32,418 km^{2} (12,517 sq mi). The resident population of the region was 1,260,617 as of January 2021. The region has a sizeable Uzbek (24.8% in 2009) minority.

== Geography ==
Jalal-Abad Region covers 32,418 km^{2} (12,517 sq mi) (16.2% of total country's area) in central-western Kyrgyzstan.

The southern edge of the region is part of the Ferghana Valley. The rest of the region is mountainous. M41, the main north-south highway from Bishkek to Osh, takes a very crooked route down the center of the region. Another road follows the south border almost to the western tip and then turns northeast up the Chatkal valley to Kyzyl-Adyr in Talas Region. Another road (closed in winter and requiring a jeep from the Ferghana range to Kazarman) goes east to Kazarman and Naryn.

An integral part of the country's power system is Toktogul hydroelectric power station, which supplies electricity and water to both Kyrgyzstan and neighboring countries.

== Ecology and environment ==
The area has several mountain lakes, walnut forests, and mineral waters. It has also the world's largest natural growing walnut forest, called Arslanbob, about 40 kilometres (25 mi) north of Jalal-Abad city. Jalal-Abad Region is rich in ecological resources. Strictly protected areas (IUCN category Ia) located in the region are Sary-Chelek, Besh-Aral, Dashman and Padysha-Ata. There are three nature parks (IUCN category II): Alatay, Kan-Achuu and Saymaluu-Tash. Natural monuments (IUCN category III) include: Tegerek Waterfall located in the upper reaches of the river Kara-Üngkür, Sogon-Tash Cave, and the Kara-Jygach Rocks, composed of red sandstone, in Aksy District. Among other protected areas are:

- Forest reserves (Kuru-Köl, Miskin-Say, Dashman, Baltyr-Khan, Uzun-Akmat)
- Botanical reserves (Chanach, Kosh-Tektir, Chatkal, Ryazan-Say, Jel-Tiybes, Kyrgyz-Gava)
- Game reserves (Toguz-Toro, Chychkan, Chandalash)

== Divisions ==
The Jalal-Abad Region is divided administratively into five cities of regional significance (Jalal-Abad, Kara-Köl, Kök-Janggak, Mayluu-Suu and Tash-Kömür) and eight districts:

| District | Seat | Location |
|---|---|---|
| Aksy District | Kerben | |
| Ala-Buka District | Ala-Buka | |
| Bazar-Korgon District | Bazar-Korgon | |
| Chatkal District | Kanysh-Kyya | |
| Nooken District | Masy | |
| Suzak District | Suzak | |
| Toguz-Toro District | Kazarman | |
| Toktogul District | Toktogul | |

Bazar-Korgon, Kerben, Kochkor-Ata and Toktogul are cities of district significance. There are four urban-type settlements in the region: Kyzyl-Jar and Shamaldy-Say (part of Tash-Kömür), Kök-Tash (part of Mayluu-Suu) and Ketmen-Töbö (part of Kara-Köl).

== Economy ==
=== Basic socio-economic indicators ===
The economically active population of Jalal-Abad Region in 2009 was 440,804, of which 401,328 employed and 39,476 (9.0%) unemployed.

- Export: 87.1 million US dollars (2008)
- Import: 111.5 million US dollars (2008)
- Direct Foreign Investments (2008): 16.8 million US dollars

=== Economy ===
Wheat, fruit, vegetables, maize, nuts, tobacco, and silk-worm cocoons are grown in the region. The region also has a few textile plants and hydroelectric stations. Minerals, natural gas, coal, metals, and oil can be found here, notably around the town of Kochkor-Ata, which is home to small scale oil industry. Most of the extraction of minerals, natural gas, coal, metals, and oil of the Soviet era has ceased.

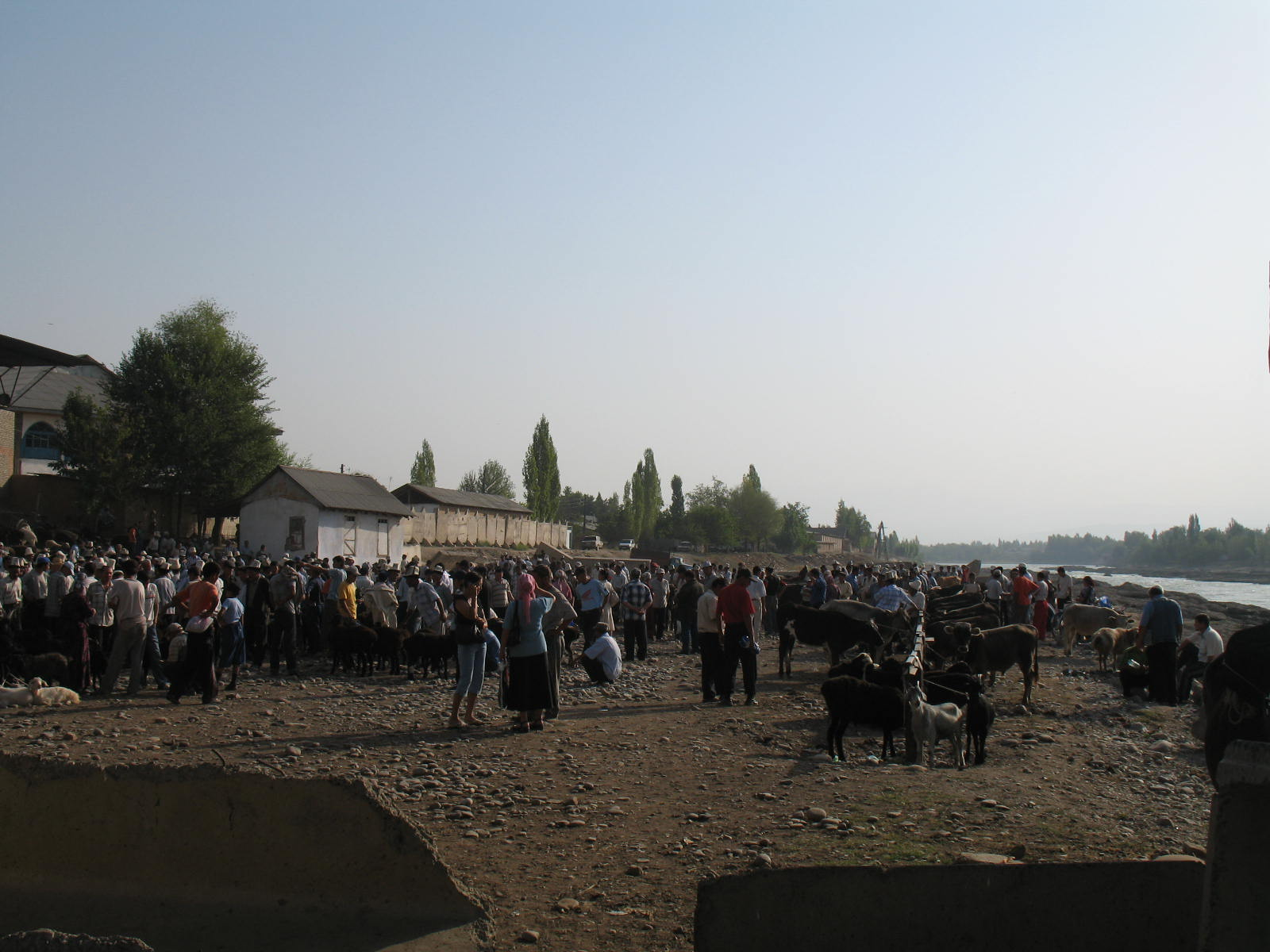
Livestock market in Kyzyl-Jar, Jalal-Abad Region

A pearl of the region is the Sary-Chelek Nature Reserve with Lake Sary-Chelek, surrounded by wild fruit orchards and snow-covered peaks.

A few Soviet-era resorts offer mineral water treatment programs for people with various chronic diseases. A number of companies have succeeded in trading bottled mineral water around the country and abroad.

Except for the small fringes of the Fergana Valley, Jalal-Abad Region is a land of mountains. There are unlimited trekking possibilities in the area, but the lack of infrastructure, except at Arslanbob, poses problems to visitors; a biodiversity conservation program supported by the government and the Global Environment Facility (GEF) is working to protect these natural resources and promote soft tourism.

== Demographics ==
The population of Jalal-Abad Region, according to the Population and Housing Census of 2009, amounted to 930,630 (enumerated de facto population) or 1,009,889 (de jure population). The official population estimate for the beginning of 2021 was 1,260,617.

Historical populations in Jalal-Abad Region
| Year | Pop. | ±% p.a. |
|---|---|---|
| 1970 | 481,691 | — |
| 1979 | 586,602 | +2.21% |
| 1989 | 743,279 | +2.40% |
| 1999 | 869,259 | +1.58% |
| 2009 | 1,009,889 | +1.51% |
| 2021 | 1,260,617 | +1.87% |
Note: resident population; Source:

=== Ethnic composition ===
According to the 2009 Census, the ethnic composition of Zhalal-Abad Region (de jure population) was:

| Ethnic group | Population | Proportion of Jalal-Abad Region population |
|---|---|---|
| Kyrgyzs | 725,321 | 71.8% |
| Uzbeks | 250,748 | 24.8% |
| Russians | 9,120 | 0.9% |
| Turks | 5,842 | 0.6% |
| Tajiks | 5,642 | 0.5% |
| Tatars | 3,694 | 0.4% |
| Uyghurs | 3,271 | 0.3% |
| Kurds | 1,902 | 0.2% |
| Azerbaijanis | 996 | 0.1% |
| Ukrainians | 789 | 0.1% |
| Kazakhs | 692 | 0.1% |
| other groups | 1,872 | 0.2% |
