= Uluk =

- Location within Kyrgyzstan
- Coordinates: 41°24′36″N 71°49′48″E
- Country: Kyrgyzstan
- Region: Jalal-Abad Region
- District: Aksy District
- Elevation: 1,054 m (3,458 ft)

Population (2021)
  - Total: 1,503
- Time zone: UTC+6

Uluk is a village in Jalal-Abad Region of Kyrgyzstan. It is part of the Aksy District. Its population was 1,503 in 2021.

Nearby towns and villages include Xazratishox (Uzbekistan, 4 km), Kerben (10 km), Bospiek (14 km), Munduz (9 km) and Sary-Kashka (5 km).
