= Arkit =

Arkit may refer to:

- ARKit, an iOS developer API
- Arkit, Republic of Dagestan, Russia
- Arkyt, Kyrgyzstan
