= Xazratishox =

Xazratishox Hazratisho
- Location in Uzbekistan
- Coordinates: 41°23′41″N 71°47′07″E
- Country: Uzbekistan
- Region: Namangan Region
- District: Chortoq District
- Elevation: 982 m (3,222 ft)

Population (2016)
  - Total: 5,900

Xazratishox (Uzbek: Xazratishox, Хазратишох or Hazratisho / Ҳазратишо) is an urban-type settlement in far eastern Uzbekistan. It is located in the Chortoq District, Namangan Region. Its population is 5,900 (2016). It is just across the border from Kyrgyzstan.

Nearby towns and villages include Iskavot (13 km), Zarkent (9 km), Uluk (4 km), Sary-Kashka (8 km), Bekobod (13 km) and Kerben (11 km).
