= Sary-Chelek Nature Reserve =

Biosphere reserve in Kyrgyzstan

- IUCN category Ia (strict nature reserve)
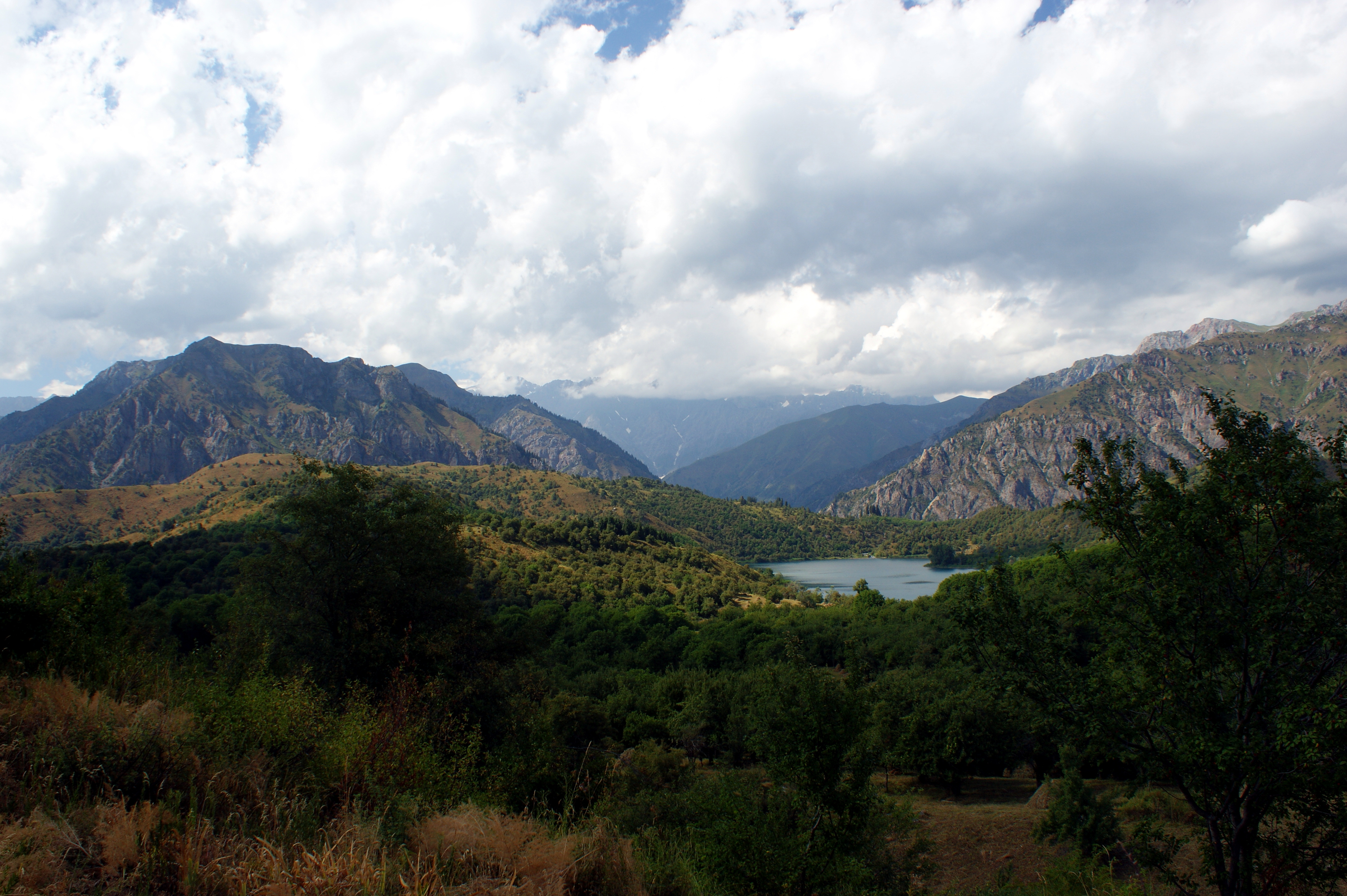
- View of the Sary-Chelek Nature Reserve; The lake in the middle is Kylaaköl

- Location within Kyrgyzstan
- Location: Jalal-Abad Region, Kyrgyzstan
- Coordinates: 41°52′N 71°59′E
- Area: 238.68 km^{2} (92.15 sq mi)
- Established: 1959

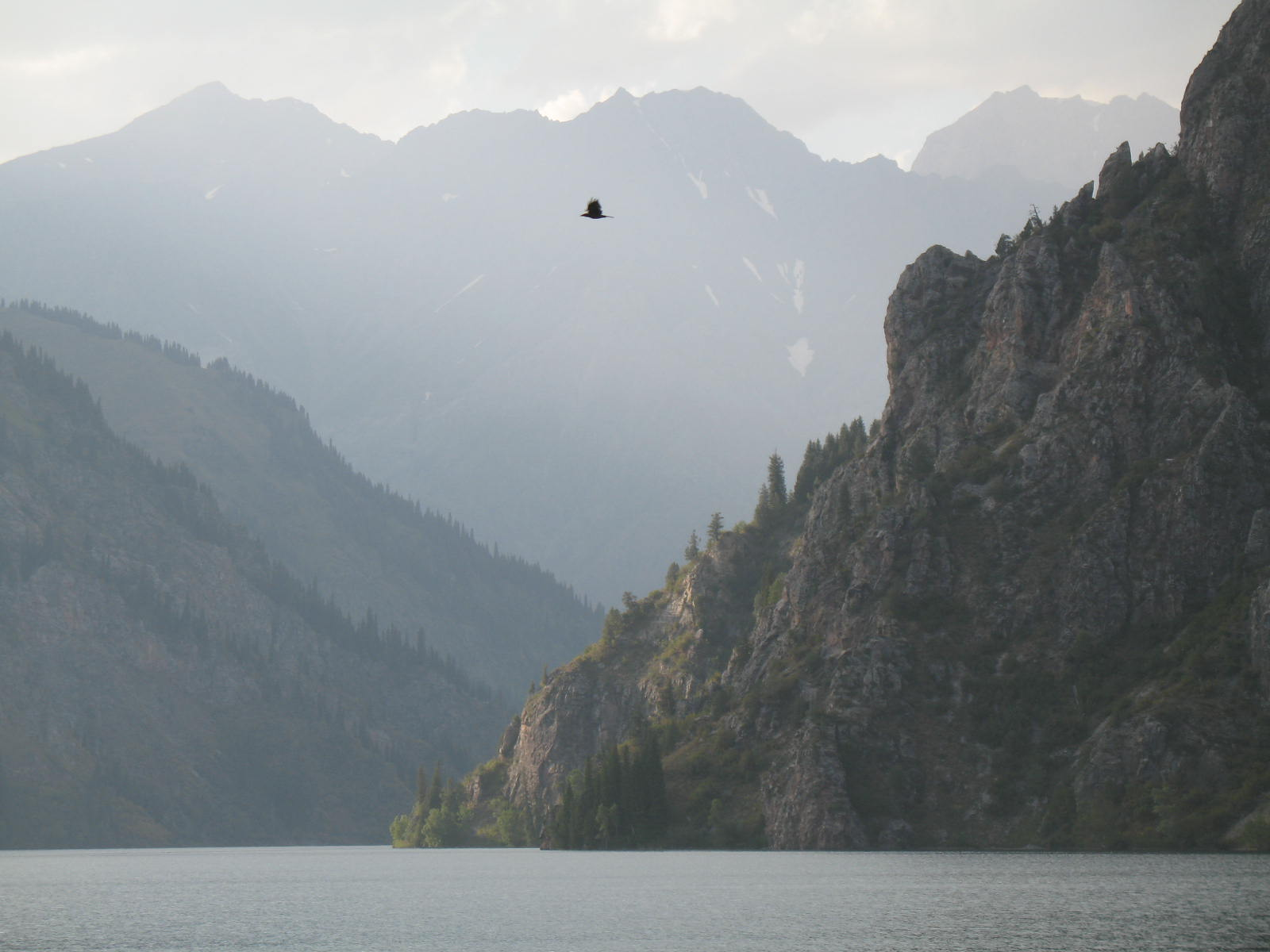
Sary-Chelek Nature Reserve: View north from the southern end of Lake Sary-Chelek.

The Sary-Chelek Nature Reserve (Kyrgyz: Сары-Челек мамлекеттик коругу, Russian: Сары-Челекский государственный заповедник) is located in Aksy District, Jalal-Abad Region in western Kyrgyzstan. Established in 1959, it currently covers 23,868 hectares. In 1978 it was designated as a World Biosphere reserve by UNESCO. The Reserve is located at altitudes from 1,200–4,247 metres (3,937–13,934 ft) above sea level. The name of Sary Chelek translates as "Yellow bucket" from Kyrgyz language.

== Geography ==
Sary-Chelek Nature Reserve is approximately 60 kilometres (37 mi) to the northwest of Tash-Kömür town. The reserve currently occupies 23,868 hectares (58,980 acres), including 18,080 hectares (44,700 acres)s core area, and 2,394 hectares (5,920 acres) transition area. Its headquarters are in the village Arkyt.

== Description ==
The comparatively large Lake Sary-Chelek is the main feature of the nature reserve. In the low hills south of Lake Sary-Chelek there are 6 smaller lakes: Kylaaköl, Iyriköl, Bakalyköl, Aramköl, Chöychökköl, and Chachaköl. The river Kojata divides the nature reserve in an eastern and western part.

Average relative humidity is about 60 percent, and annual rainfall is about 817 millimetres (32.2 in) at the Sary-Chelek Nature Reserve.
