= Kyzyl-Köl =

Kyzyl-Köl Кызыл-Көл
- Location in Kyrgyzstan
- Coordinates: 41°47′N 72°3′E
- Country: Kyrgyzstan
- Region: Jalal-Abad
- District: Aksy
- Elevation: 1,166 m (3,825 ft)

Population (2021)
  - Total: 1,552

Kyzyl-Köl (Kyrgyz: Кызыл-Көл) is a village in Jalal-Abad Region, in Kyrgyzstan. It lies on the river Kara-Suu, approximately 9 km (5.6 mi) north of Chaldybar. It is part of the Aksy District. Its population was 1,552 in 2021.
