= Ak-Jol =

Ak-Jol may refer to:

- Ak-Jol (river), a river in Kyrgyzstan
- Ak-Jol, Chüy, a village in Sokuluk District, Chüy Region, Kyrgyzstan
- Ak-Jol, Jalal-Abad, a village in Aksy District, Jalal-Abad Region, Kyrgyzstan
- Ak Jol, a Kyrgyz political party
