= Naryn (disambiguation) =

Naryn is a city in Kyrgyzstan.

Naryn may also refer to:

== Geography ==
- Naryn (river), a river in Kyrgyzstan and Uzbekistan
- Naryn (Irtysh), a river in northeastern Kazakhstan
- Naryn Region, an administrative division of Kyrgyzstan
- Naryn District, an administrative division of Kyrgyzstan
- Naryn, Jalal-Abad, a village in Jalal-Abad Region, Kyrgyzstan
- Naryn, Dzhidinsky District, Republic of Buryatia, a town in Russia

== Other ==
- Naryn (dish), a dish in Central Asian cuisine
- Naryn castle (Meybod), in Iran
- Naryn castle (Nain), in Iran
