= Mikhail Lukyanov (necrophile) =

Kyrgyzstani murderer and necrophile

- Born: Mikhail Ivanovich Lukyanov; 1949; Frunze, Kirghiz SSR
- Died: 1997 (aged 47–48); SIZO-1, Moldovanovka, Chüy Region, Kyrgyzstan
- Cause of death: Suicide by hanging
- Other names: "The Monster of Bishkek" "The Bishkek Necrophile"
- Convictions: Murder; Desecration of a corpse x46
- Penalty: Murder: 10 years imprisonment (1960s); Desecration of a corpse: 3 or 10 years imprisonment (1996/1997)

Details
- Victims: 1 murder victim 46+ (necrophilia)
- Span of crimes: 1960s (murder); 1967 – 1995 (necrophilia)
- Country: Soviet Union, later Kyrgyzstan, Kazakhstan and Russia
- Date apprehended: 1960s (murder charge); 8 October 1995 (necrophilia)

Mikhail Ivanovich Lukyanov (Russian: Михаил Иванович Лукьянов; 1949 – 1997), known as The Monster of Bishkek (Russian: Бишкекский монстр), was a Soviet–Kyrgyzstani murderer and prolific necrophile. After being paroled for murdering his stepfather in the early 1960s, Lukyanov proceeded to dig up bodies of young girls and women from cemeteries across Kyrgyzstan, Kazakhstan and Russia, which he would sexually abuse until his arrest in 1995.

Lukyanov's case is regarded as one of the most infamous cases of necrophilia in the post-Soviet states, and he is regarded as one of the most well-known criminals in modern Kyrgyzstani history.

== Wandering and acts of necrophilia ==
Soon after this incident, Lukyanov started traveling across the Kyrgyz SSR to avoid detection, working variously as a carpenter, electrician, locksmith, and a plumber.

For a majority of the crimes, Lukyanov frequented three cemeteries in the Chüy Region. As a rule, he would only attempt anything at dusk, and only when sober. He often chose bodies of girls and women who had died no more than a month prior, and were not older than 40. Despite this, police later linked him to two instances in which these rules were broken: the first involved a 3-year girl, while the second was a 69-year-old woman.

Following the dissolution of the Soviet Union, Lukyanov left Kyrgyzstan and went to work first in Kazakhstan before moving on to Russia. While living in these countries, he continued his necrophiliac activities, most actively in Russia's Omsk and Novosibirsk Oblasts.

== Arrest, imprisonment, and suicide ==
What exactly happened to Lukyanov after his arrest is unclear. In one version, he spent some time at a psychiatric clinic in Kyzyl-Jar before being ruled sane to stand trial and eventually sentenced to 10 years imprisonment by the Kemin District Court. Another version claims he was only sentenced to three years imprisonment. After the conclusion of his trial, Lukyanov was incarcerated at the SIZO-1 in Moldovanovka. He spent approximately six months in the facility before ultimately hanging himself due to the constant mockery and abuse at the hands of guards and other inmates.

== In the media and culture ==
In 2025, a film titled 46 Nights (Russian: 46 ночей) was released that was inspired by the Lukyanov case. It caused controversy in Kyrgyzstan, as it sparked debate over its violent and graphic scenes, as well as claims by critics that it might inspire mentally ill copycats. After a wave of public outrage, the film was banned in Kazakhstan.

== See also ==
- Incidents of necrophilia
