= Avletim (river) =

Avletim Aflatun
- Location within Kyrgyzstan
- Native name: Авлетим (Kyrgyz)

Location
- Country: Kyrgyzstan

Physical characteristics
- Mouth: Kara-Suu
  - coordinates: 41°38′29.3″N 72°03′54.3″E
- Length: 35 km (22 mi)
- Basin size: 863 km^{2} (333 sq mi)
- Discharge
  - average: 10.6 m^{3}/s (370 cu ft/s)
  - minimum: 5.6 m^{3}/s (200 cu ft/s)
  - maximum: 20 m^{3}/s (710 cu ft/s)

Basin features
- Progression: Kara-Suu→ Naryn→ Syr Darya→ North Aral Sea

The Avletim (Kyrgyz: Авлетим) is a right tributary of the Kara-Suu in Aksy District of Jalal-Abad Region, Kyrgyzstan. The river takes its rise in the south-east slopes of the Chatkal Range. The Avletim is 35 km (22 mi) long and has a catchment area of 863 km^{2} (333 sq mi).The average yearly discharge is 10.6 m^{3}/s (370 cu ft/s); the maximum and the minimum discharges are 20 m^{3}/s (710 cu ft/s) and 5.6 m^{3}/s (200 cu ft/s) respectfully. The river is used for irrigation.
