= Kyzyl-Tuu, Aksy =

Kyzyl-Tuu Кызыл-Туу
- Location within Kyrgyzstan
- Coordinates: 41°40′30″N 72°1′40″E
- Country: Kyrgyzstan
- Region: Jalal-Abad Region
- District: Aksy District

Population (2021)
  - Total: 2,792
- Time zone: UTC+6

Kyzyl-Tuu is a village in Jalal-Abad Region in the west of Kyrgyzstan. It is part of the Aksy District. Its population was 2,792 in 2021. It lies near the confluence of the rivers Kojata and Kara-Suu.
