= Tologon Kasymbek =

Soviet and Kyrgyz author (1931–2011)

- Касымбек уулу Төлөгөн
- Born: 15 January 1931; Akjol, Aksy District, Jalal-Abad Region, Kirghiz ASSR, Soviet Union
- Died: 16 June 2011 (aged 80); Bishkek, Kyrgyz Republic
- Spouse(s): Adash, Elmira
- Writing career
- Genres: novels, short stories
- Notable work: The Broken Sword

Signature
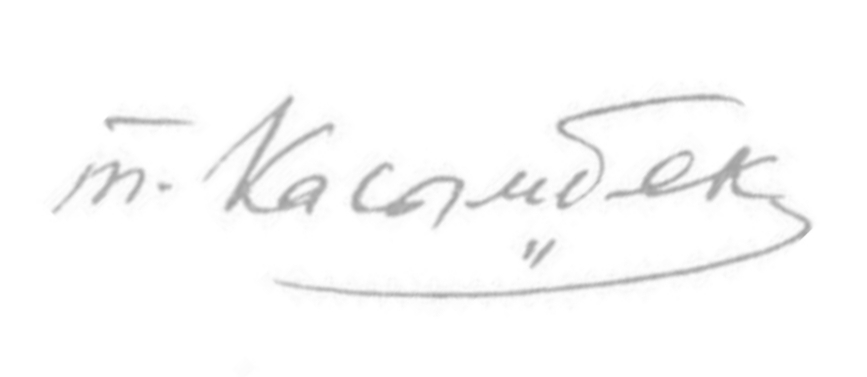

Tölögön Kasymbek (Kyrgyz: Төлөгөн Касымбек) (also, Kasymbekov, also transliterated from Russian as Tolegen Kassymbekov) (15 January 1931 – 16 June 2011) was a Kyrgyz author who mostly wrote historical novels.

== Life ==
He was born in the village of Akjol. His father, a mullah, died when he was about 14 or 15 years old.

In 1952, while he was still a student, he published his fist work "Little Horseman" in the journal "Soviet Kyrgyzstan". The short story "I want to be a man" was published in Russian in 1965.

His first longer work, the historical novel "The Broken Sword" is also his most well known. It was first published in journals, being completed in 1966, and published in book form in 1971. It was translated into English by David Foreman and Sergei Sosinsky and published in 1980.

== Novels ==
- The Broken Sword ("Сынган кылыч", 1966, 1971)
- Mature Age ("Жетилген Курак", 1976)
- Welfare ("Келкел", 1986)
- Invasion ("Баскын", 2000)
- Massacre ("Кыргын", 2004)

== Novellas ==
- I want to be a man
- Orphan
