= Syny =

- Location within Kyrgyzstan
- Coordinates: 41°37′N 72°3′E
- Country: Kyrgyzstan
- Region: Jalal-Abad Region
- District: Aksy District
- Elevation: 851 m (2,792 ft)

Population (2021)
  - Total: 993
- Time zone: UTC+6

Syny is a village in Jalal-Abad Region of Kyrgyzstan. It is part of the Aksy District. Its population was 993 in 2021.
