= Jyl-Kol =

Jyl-Kol Жыл-Кол
- Location within Kyrgyzstan
- Coordinates: 41°10′32″N 72°05′11″E
- Country: Kyrgyzstan
- Region: Jalal-Abad
- District: Aksy

Population (2021)
  - Total: 1,094
- Time zone: UTC+6

Jyl-Kol (Kyrgyz: Жыл-Кол) is a village in Jalal-Abad Region of Kyrgyzstan. It is part of the Aksy District. The village's population was 1,094 in 2021.

== Population ==
Historical population
Year	Pop.	±% p.a.
2009	867	—
2021	1,094	+1.96%
Note: resident population; Sources:
