= Tuyuk-Jar =

Tuyuk-Jar Туюк-Жар
- Location within Kyrgyzstan
- Coordinates: 41°35′51″N 71°39′36″E
- Country: Kyrgyzstan
- Region: Jalal-Abad
- District: Aksy
- Established: 2019

Population (2021)
  - Total: 1,455
- Time zone: UTC+5

Tuyuk-Jar (Kyrgyz: Туюк-Жар) is a village in Jalal-Abad Region of Kyrgyzstan. It is part of the Aksy District. The village was established in the area of Kashka-Suu rural settlement (ayyl ökmötü) in July 2019. Its population was 1,455 in 2021.
