= Koy-Tash, Aksy =

Koy-Tash Кой-Таш
- Location within Kyrgyzstan
- Coordinates: 41°34′36″N 72°06′31″E
- Country: Kyrgyzstan
- Region: Jalal-Abad
- District: Aksy
- Elevation: 950 m (3,120 ft)

Population (2021)
  - Total: 2,016
- Time zone: UTC+6

Koy-Tash (Kyrgyz: Кой-Таш) is a village in Jalal-Abad Region of Kyrgyzstan. It is part of the Aksy District. The village's population was 2,016 in 2021.

== Population ==
Historical population
Year	Pop.	±% p.a.
2009	1,578	—
2021	2,016	+2.06%
Note: resident population; Sources:
