= Tegirmen-Say =

Tegirmen-Say Тегирмен-Сай
- Location within Kyrgyzstan
- Coordinates: 41°38′N 71°51′E
- Country: Kyrgyzstan
- Region: Jalal-Abad
- District: Aksy

Population (2021)
  - Total: 631
- Time zone: UTC+6

Tegirmen-Say (Kyrgyz: Тегирмен-Сай) is a village in Jalal-Abad Region of Kyrgyzstan. It is part of the Aksy District. Its population was 631 in 2021.
