= It-Agar =

It-Agar Ит-Агар
- Etymology: Kyrgyz: Ит Агар ("river that will carry a dog")
- Location within Kyrgyzstan
- Coordinates: 41°37′55″N 71°52′25″E
- Country: Kyrgyzstan
- Region: Jalal-Abad
- District: Aksy
- Elevation: 1,140 m (3,740 ft)

Population (2021)
  - Total: 1,301
- Time zone: UTC+6

It-Agar (Kyrgyz: Ит-Агар) is a village in Jalal-Abad Region of Kyrgyzstan. It is part of the Aksy District. The village's population was 1,301 in 2021.

== Climate ==
Climate data for It-Agar (1991–2020)
Month	Jan	Feb	Mar	Apr	May	Jun	Jul	Aug	Sep	Oct	Nov	Dec	Year
Daily mean °C (°F)	−10.1 (13.8)	−7.1 (19.2)	−0.2 (31.6)	6.6 (43.9)	10.7 (51.3)	13.7 (56.7)	16.1 (61.0)	16.3 (61.3)	12.7 (54.9)	6.0 (42.8)	1.0 (33.8)	−7.8 (18.0)	4.7 (40.5)
Source: NOAA

== Population ==
Historical population
Year	Pop.	±% p.a.
2009	986	—
2021	1,301	+2.34%
Note: resident population; Sources:
