= Chat, Kyrgyzstan =

Chat
- Location within Kyrgyzstan
- Coordinates: 41°44′30″N 72°3′27″E
- Country: Kyrgyzstan
- Region: Jalal-Abad Region
- District: Aksy District
- Elevation: 1,160 m (3,810 ft)

Population (2021)
  - Total: 372
- Time zone: UTC+6

Chat is a village in Jalal-Abad Region of Kyrgyzstan. It is part of the Aksy District. Its population was 372 in 2021.
