= Razan-Say =

- Location within Kyrgyzstan
- Coordinates: 41°28′40″N 72°17′50″E
- Country: Kyrgyzstan
- Region: Jalal-Abad Region
- District: Aksy District

Population (2021)
  - Total: 305
- Time zone: UTC+6

Razan-Say is a village in Jalal-Abad Region of Kyrgyzstan. It is part of the Aksy District. Its population was 305 in 2021.
