= Korgon-Döbö =

Korgon-Döbö Коргон-Дөбө
- Location within Kyrgyzstan
- Coordinates: 41°29′0″N 72°6′10″E
- Country: Kyrgyzstan
- Region: Jalal-Abad Region
- District: Aksy District

Population (2021)
  - Total: 1,785
- Time zone: UTC+6

Korgon-Döbö is a village in Jalal-Abad Region of Kyrgyzstan. It is part of the Aksy District. Its population was 1,785 in 2021.
