= Kara-Suu (Aksy) =

- Native name: Кара-Суу (Kyrgyz)

Location
- Country: Kyrgyzstan

Physical characteristics
- Mouth: Naryn
  - coordinates: 41°24′25″N 72°13′33″E
- Length: 85 km (53 mi)
- Basin size: 2,740 km^{2} (1,060 sq mi)
- Discharge
  - average: 41.2 m^{3}/s (1,450 cu ft/s)

Basin features
- Progression: Naryn→ Syr Darya→ North Aral Sea
- Tributaries
  - left: Ak-Jol, Turduk
  - right: Avletim, Kojata

The Kara-Suu (Kyrgyz: Кара-Суу) or (Kyrgyz: Карасуу) is a right tributary of the Naryn in Aksy District, Jalal-Abad Region, Kyrgyzstan. The river originates in the Chatkal Range, western Tian Shan mountains. It flows through the villages Chaldybar and Jangy-Jol. The river discharges into the Naryn north of Tash-Kömür. It is 85 kilometres (53 mi) long, and the average yearly discharge is 41.2 m^{3}/s (1,450 cu ft/s). The Kara-Suu's peak flow is in May, and the minimum flow in January. The basin area is 2,740 square kilometres (1,060 sq mi). The main tributaries are Ak-Jol, Turduk, Avletim, and Kojata. The lake is located at 2022 meters above sea level.
