= Tor-Kamysh =

Tor-Kamysh Тор-Камыш
- Location within Kyrgyzstan
- Coordinates: 41°36′59″N 72°05′09″E
- Country: Kyrgyzstan
- Region: Jalal-Abad
- District: Aksy
- Elevation: 870 m (2,850 ft)

Population (2021)
  - Total: 875
- Time zone: UTC+6

Tor-Kamysh (Kyrgyz: Тор-Камыш) or Torkamysh is a village in Jalal-Abad Region of Kyrgyzstan. It is part of the Aksy District. The village's population was 875 in 2021.

== Population ==
Historical population
Year	Pop.	±% p.a.
2009	504	—
2021	875	+4.70%
Note: resident population; Sources:
