= Jolborstu =

Jolborstu Жолборсту
- Location within Kyrgyzstan
- Coordinates: 41°36′45″N 72°11′55″E
- Country: Kyrgyzstan
- Region: Jalal-Abad
- District: Aksy
- Elevation: 1,170 m (3,840 ft)

Population (2021)
  - Total: 713
- Time zone: UTC+6

Jolborstu (Kyrgyz: Жолборсту) or Djolborstu is a village in Jalal-Abad Region of Kyrgyzstan. It is part of the Aksy District. The village's population was 713 in 2021.

== Population ==
Historical population
Year	Pop.	±% p.a.
2009	735	—
2021	713	−0.25%
Note: resident population; Sources:
