= Arkyt, Kyrgyzstan =

Arkyt Аркыт
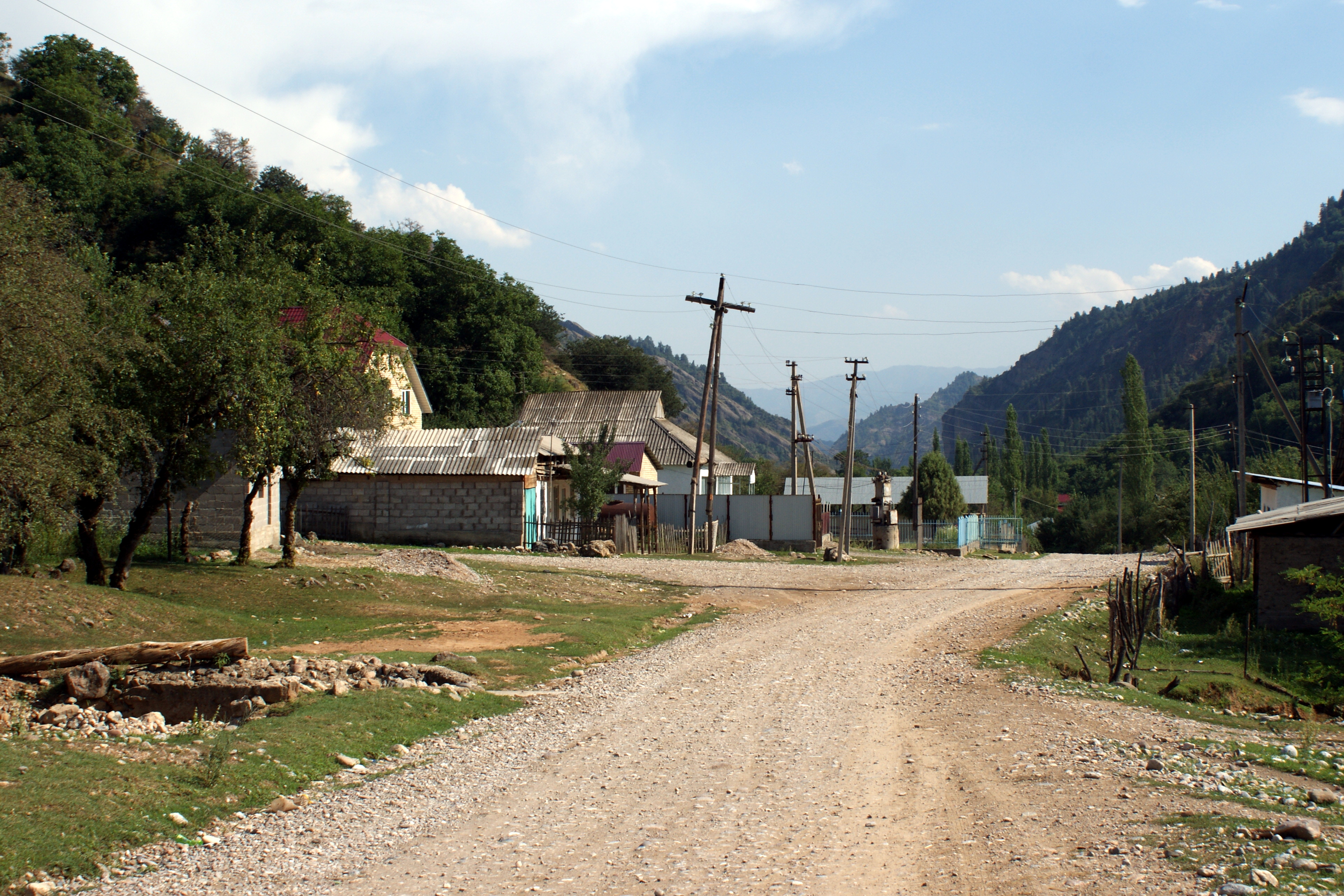

- Location within Kyrgyzstan
- Coordinates: 41°48′20″N 71°57′30″E
- Country: Kyrgyzstan
- Region: Jalal-Abad
- District: Aksy
- Elevation: 1,320 m (4,330 ft)

Population (2021)
  - Total: 1,379
- Time zone: UTC+6

Arkyt (Kyrgyz: Аркыт, Uzbek: Arkit) is a village in Jalal-Abad Region of Kyrgyzstan, located south of Lake Sary-Chelek and north of Kerben. It is part of the Aksy District. It is the headquarters of the Sary-Chelek Nature Reserve. Its population was 1,379 in 2021.
