= Ak-Suu, Jalal-Abad =

Ak-Suu Ак-Суу
- Location within Kyrgyzstan
- Coordinates: 41°27′40″N 72°5′0″E
- Country: Kyrgyzstan
- Region: Jalal-Abad Region
- District: Aksy District
- Elevation: 944 m (3,097 ft)

Population (2021)
  - Total: 3,210
- Time zone: UTC+6

Ak-Suu is a village in Jalal-Abad Region of Kyrgyzstan. It is part of the Aksy District. Its population was 3,210 in 2021.
