= Ölöng-Bulak =

Settlement in Jalal-Abad, Kyrgyzstan

Ölöng-Bulak Өлөң-Булак
- Location within Kyrgyzstan
- Coordinates: 41°33′N 71°41′E
- Country: Kyrgyzstan
- Region: Jalal-Abad
- District: Aksy
- Established: 2019

Population (2021)
  - Total: 1,241
- Time zone: UTC+5

Ölöng-Bulak (Kyrgyz: Өлөң-Булак) is a village in Jalal-Abad Region of Kyrgyzstan. It is part of the Aksy District. The village was established in the area of Kashka-Suu rural settlement (ayyl ökmötü) and was officially assigned to ayyl (village) category in July 2019. Its population was 1,241 in 2021.
