= Kara-Döbö, Jalal-Abad =

Kara-Döbö
- Location within Kyrgyzstan
- Coordinates: 41°30′20″N 71°37′50″E
- Country: Kyrgyzstan
- Region: Jalal-Abad Region
- District: Aksy District

Population (2021)
  - Total: 541
- Time zone: UTC+6

Kara-Döbö is a village in Jalal-Abad Region of Kyrgyzstan. It is part of the Aksy District. Its population was 541 in 2021.
