= Kyzyl-Kapchygay =

Kyzyl-Kapchygay Кызыл-Капчыгай
- Etymology: Kyrgyz: Кызыл Капчыгай ("red gorge")
- Location within Kyrgyzstan
- Coordinates: 41°36′21″N 71°47′35″E
- Country: Kyrgyzstan
- Region: Jalal-Abad
- District: Aksy
- Elevation: 1,465 m (4,806 ft)

Population (2021)
  - Total: 1,522
- Time zone: UTC+6

Kyzyl-Kapchygay (Kyrgyz: Кызыл-Капчыгай) is a village in Jalal-Abad Region of Kyrgyzstan. It is part of the Aksy District. The village's population was 1,522 in 2021.

== Population ==
Historical population
Year	Pop.	±% p.a.
2009	1,194	—
2021	1,522	+2.04%
Note: resident population; Sources:
