= Kyzyl-Beyit =

Kyzyl-Beyit Кызыл-Бейит
- Location within Kyrgyzstan
- Coordinates: 41°32′30″N 72°24′50″E
- Country: Kyrgyzstan
- Region: Jalal-Abad Region
- District: Aksy District
- Elevation: 1,207 m (3,960 ft)

Population (2021)
  - Total: 342
- Time zone: UTC+6

Kyzyl-Beyit (Kyrgyz: Кызыл-Бейит) is a remote village in the Jalal-Abad Region of Kyrgyzstan. It is part of the Aksy District. It is bordered by mountains on one side and the Naryn River on the other. Transportation to and from the village mainly relies on ferries and boats. Its population was 342 in 2021.
