= Raykomol =

Raykomol Райкомол
- Location within Kyrgyzstan
- Coordinates: 41°36′06″N 72°14′19″E
- Country: Kyrgyzstan
- Region: Jalal-Abad
- District: Aksy
- Elevation: 970 m (3,180 ft)

Population (2021)
  - Total: 1,892
- Time zone: UTC+6

Raykomol (Kyrgyz: Райкомол) is a village in Jalal-Abad Region of Kyrgyzstan. It is part of the Aksy District. The village's population was 1,892 in 2021.

== Population ==
Historical population
Year	Pop.	±% p.a.
2009	1,286	—
2021	1,892	+3.27%
Note: resident population; Sources:
