= Jerge-Tal, Jalal-Abad =

Jerge-Tal
- Location within Kyrgyzstan
- Coordinates: 41°34′30″N 71°48′50″E
- Country: Kyrgyzstan
- Region: Jalal-Abad Region
- District: Aksy District
- Elevation: 1,300 m (4,300 ft)

Population (2021)
  - Total: 5,436
- Time zone: UTC+6

Jerge-Tal (Kyrgyz: Жерге-Тал, formerly: Uspenovka) is a village in Jalal-Abad Region of Kyrgyzstan. It is part of the Aksy District. Its population was 5,436 in 2021.

== Population ==
Historical population
Year	Pop.	±% p.a.
2009	4,480	—
2021	5,436	+1.62%
Note: resident population; Sources:
