= Kechüü =

Kechüü Кечүү
- Etymology: Kyrgyz: Кечүү ("ford" or "water crossing")
- Location within Kyrgyzstan
- Coordinates: 41°34′34″N 72°15′56″E
- Country: Kyrgyzstan
- Region: Jalal-Abad
- District: Aksy
- Elevation: 1,190 m (3,900 ft)

Population (2021)
  - Total: 848
- Time zone: UTC+6

Kechüü (Kyrgyz: Кечүү) is a village in Jalal-Abad Region of Kyrgyzstan. It is part of the Aksy District. The village's population was 848 in 2021.

== Population ==
Historical population
Year	Pop.	±% p.a.
2009	677	—
2021	848	+1.89%
Note: resident population; Sources:
