= Semet, Aksy =

Semet Семет
- Location within Kyrgyzstan
- Coordinates: 41°23′45″N 71°52′07″E
- Country: Kyrgyzstan
- Region: Jalal-Abad
- District: Aksy
- Elevation: 1,035 m (3,396 ft)

Population (2021)
  - Total: 971
- Time zone: UTC+6

Semet (Kyrgyz: Семет) is a village in Jalal-Abad Region of Kyrgyzstan. It is part of the Aksy District. The village's population was 971 in 2021.

== Population ==
Historical population
Year	Pop.	±% p.a.
2009	1,426	—
2021	971	−3.15%
Note: resident population; Sources:
