= Jangy-Jol, Aksy =

Jangy-Jol Жаңы-Жол
- Location within Kyrgyzstan
- Coordinates: 41°35′40″N 72°07′20″E
- Country: Kyrgyzstan
- Region: Jalal-Abad
- District: Aksy
- Elevation: 850 m (2,790 ft)

Population (2021)
  - Total: 3,033
- Time zone: UTC+6

Jangy-Jol (Kyrgyz: Жаңы-Жол, formerly Malkaldy) is a village in Aksy District of Jalal-Abad Region of Kyrgyzstan. It is the seat of Jangy-Jol ayyl aymagy (rural community). Its population was 3,033 in 2021. The village lies along the river Malkaldy and its confluence with the Kara-Suu. From 1943 until 1958, the village was the administrative center of the Jangy-Jol District, which was renamed into Aksy District in 1991.

== Main features of the village ==
The village has a small hospital, a big and modern two-store Kyrgyz-language secondary school, a club and a mosque. Absolute majority of the residents are Muslim Kyrgyz. There are some Russians, Uzbeks, etc. The residents of the village are mostly farmers. They also have some summer pastures to breed domestic animals.

== Prominent people from the village ==
Some politicians, like Maten Sydykov, and journalist and publicist Uran Toktonazarovich Botobekov were born in the village.
