= Ak-Jol (river) =

Ak-Jol Akjol
- Location within Kyrgyzstan
- Native name: Ак-Жол (Kyrgyz)

Location
- Country: Kyrgyzstan

Physical characteristics
- Mouth: Kara-Suu
  - coordinates: 41°32′57″N 72°08′21″E
- Length: 29 km (18 mi)
- Basin size: 240 km^{2} (93 sq mi)
- Discharge
  - average: 8 m^{3}/s (280 cu ft/s)

Basin features
- Progression: Kara-Suu→ Naryn→ Syr Darya→ North Aral Sea

The Ak-Jol (Kyrgyz: Ак-Жол) or (Kyrgyz: Акжол) is a left tributary of the Kara-Suu in Aksy District of Jalal-Abad Region, Kyrgyzstan. The river takes its rise in the south-west slopes of the Fergana Range. The Ak-Jol is 29 km (18 mi) long and has a catchment area of 240 km^{2} (93 sq mi). The average yearly discharge is 8 m^{3}/s (280 cu ft/s). The maximum flow is in May–June and the minimum - in January - February. The river is used for irrigation.
