= Atana, Aksy =

Atana Атана
- Location within Kyrgyzstan
- Coordinates: 41°22′06″N 71°51′17″E
- Country: Kyrgyzstan
- Region: Jalal-Abad
- District: Aksy
- Elevation: 960 m (3,150 ft)

Population (2021)
  - Total: 3,335
- Time zone: UTC+6

Atana (Kyrgyz: Атана) is a village in Jalal-Abad Region of Kyrgyzstan. It is part of the Aksy District. The village's population was 3,335 in 2021.

== Population ==
Historical population
Year	Pop.	±% p.a.
2009	2,732	—
2021	3,335	+1.68%
Note: resident population; Sources:
