= Mukur, Kyrgyzstan =

Mukur
- Location within Kyrgyzstan
- Coordinates: 41°37′0″N 71°53′20″E
- Country: Kyrgyzstan
- Region: Jalal-Abad Region
- District: Aksy District

Population (2021)
  - Total: 2,156
- Time zone: UTC+6

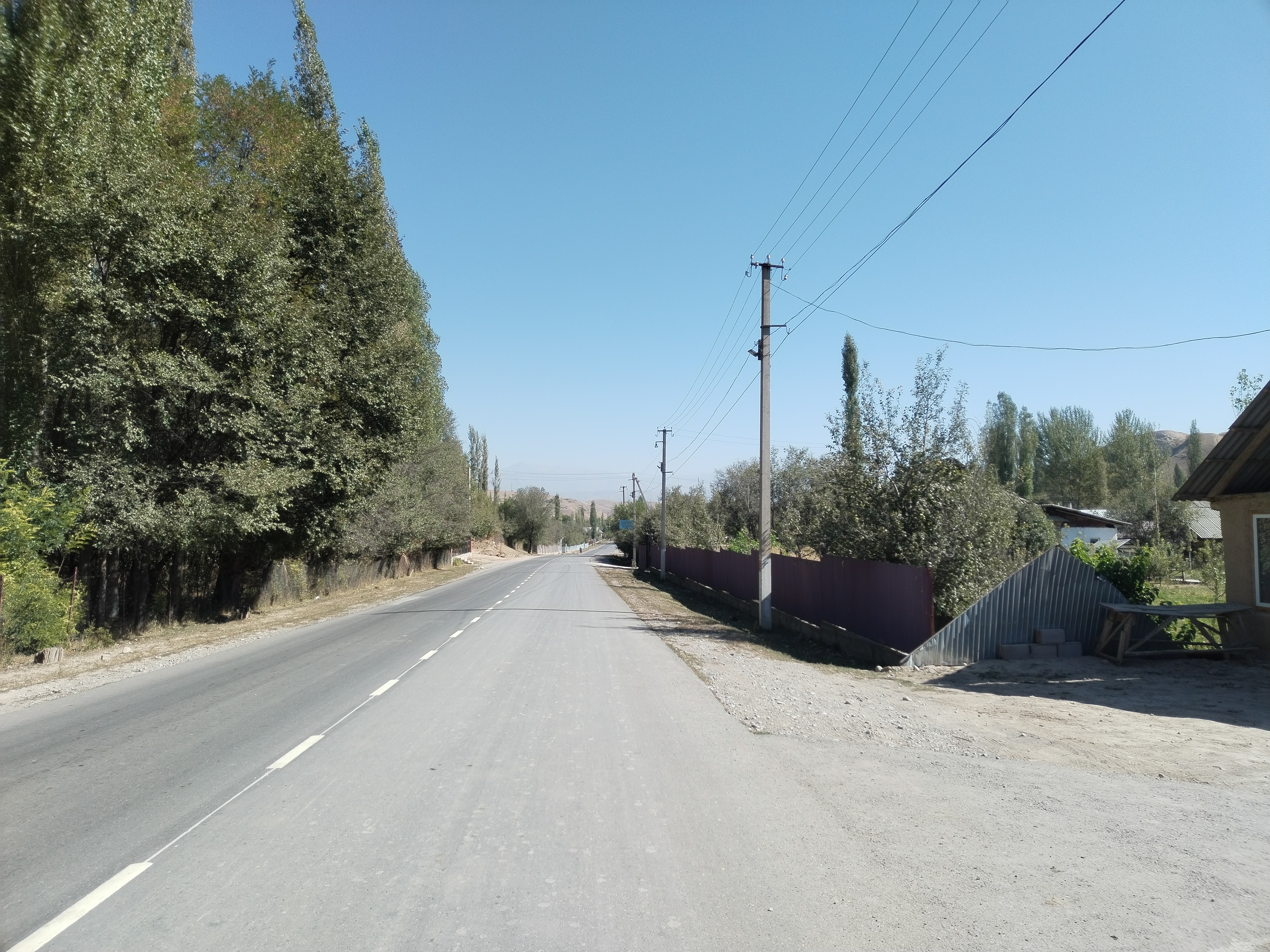
Mumkur

Mukur is a village in Jalal-Abad Region of Kyrgyzstan. It is part of the Aksy District. Its population was 2,156 in 2021.
