= Naryn, Jalal-Abad =

Naryn Нарын
- Location within Kyrgyzstan
- Coordinates: 41°07′50″N 72°04′50″E
- Country: Kyrgyzstan
- Region: Jalal-Abad
- District: Aksy

Population (2021)
  - Total: 11,306
- Time zone: UTC+6

Naryn (Kyrgyz: Нарын) is a village in Jalal-Abad Region of Kyrgyzstan. It is part of the Aksy District. Its population was 11,306 in 2021. It is situated on the right bank of the river Naryn, adjacent to Kyzyl-Jar and across from Uchqoʻrgʻon (Uzbekistan).

== Population ==
Historical population
| Year | Pop. | ±% p.a. |
|---|---|---|
| 2009 | 7,730 | — |
| 2021 | 11,306 | +3.22% |
Note: resident population; Sources:
