= Tegene, Aksy =

Tegene Тегене
- Location within Kyrgyzstan
- Coordinates: 41°31′31″N 72°12′40″E
- Country: Kyrgyzstan
- Region: Jalal-Abad
- District: Aksy
- Highest elevation: 1,035 m (3,396 ft)
- Lowest elevation: 945 m (3,100 ft)

Population (2021)
  - Total: 1,558
- Time zone: UTC+6

Tegene (Kyrgyz: Тегене) is a village in Jalal-Abad Region of Kyrgyzstan. It is part of the Aksy District. The village's population was 1,558 in 2021.

== Population ==
Historical population
Year	Pop.	±% p.a.
2009	934	—
2021	1,558	+4.36%
Note: resident population; Sources:
