= Lake Sary-Chelek =

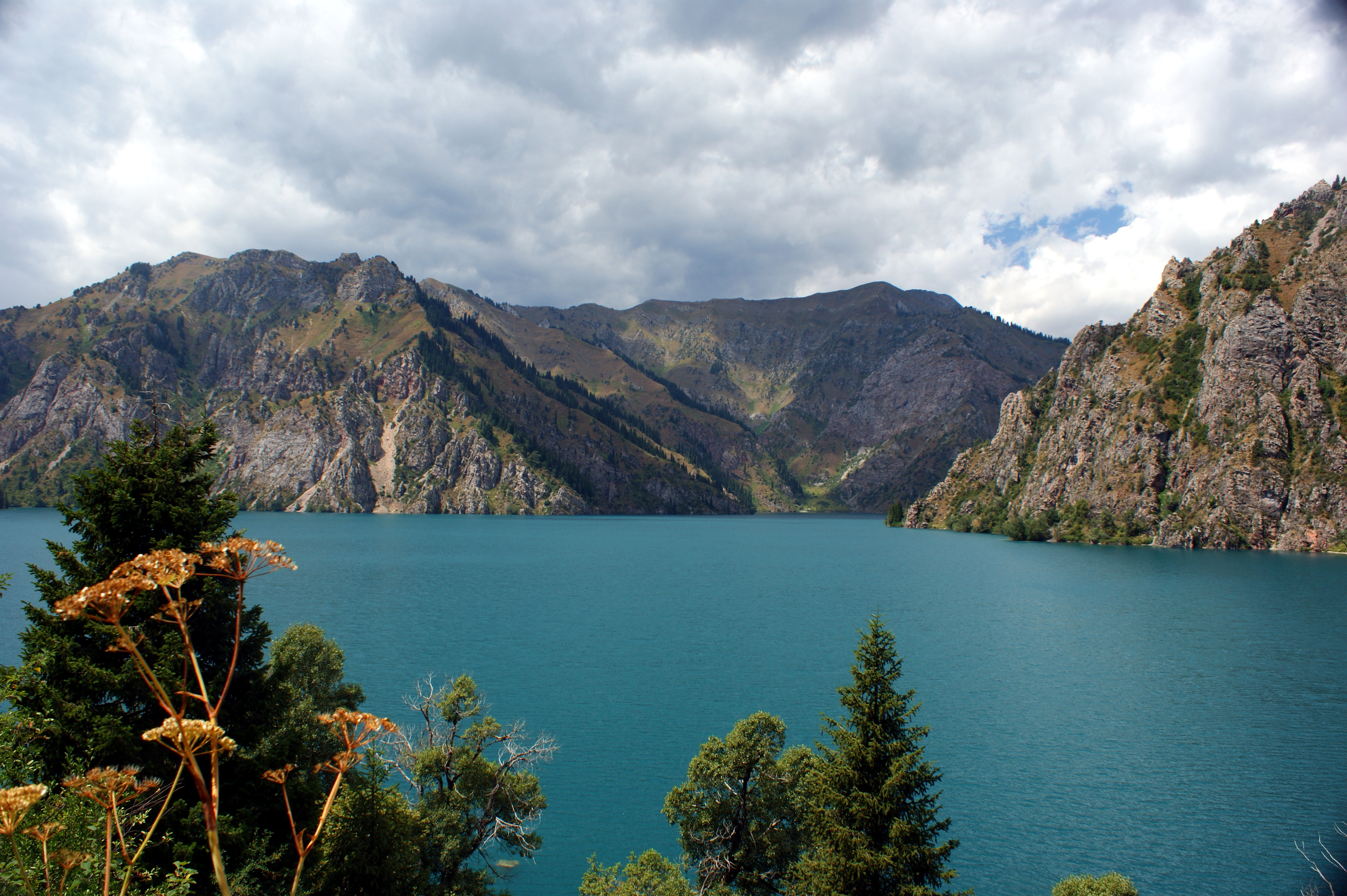
- View from the south end of Sary-Chelek looking north

- Location within Kyrgyzstan Location within Asia
- Interactive map of Lake Sary-Chelek
- Coordinates: 41°54′N 71°57′E
- Type: Mountain lake
- Primary inflows: Glaciers
- Primary outflows: Toskool
- Basin countries: Kyrgyzstan
- Max. length: 7.5 km (4.7 mi)
- Max. width: 650 m (2,130 ft)
- Surface area: 4.92 km^{2} (1.90 sq mi)
- Max. depth: 234 m (768 ft)
- Surface elevation: 1,873 m (6,145 ft)

Sary-Chelek (also Sarychelek, Kyrgyz: Сарычелек; Russian: Сары-Челек) is a mountain lake located in Sary-Chelek Nature Reserve in Jalal-Abad Province in Western Kyrgyzstan. It is north of Arkyt (the park headquarters) at the eastern end of the Chatkal Range. There are a number of smaller lakes in the area. The lake is 7.5 km (4.7 mi) long and its average width is 650 m (2,130 ft). Its area is 4.92 km^{2} (1.90 sq mi) and its maximum depth is 234 m (768 ft). It is drained by the river Toskool, a tributary of the Kojata.
