= Uran Botobekov =

Kyrgyz-American scholar (born 1967)

Uran Toktonazarovich Botobekov
- Born: May 1, 1967; Malkaldy village (formerly Jangy-Jol, Aksy District, Jalal-Abad Region, Kirghiz SSR, Soviet Union)
- Citizenship: Kyrgyzstan
- Education: Kyrgyz National University, Bishkek
- Occupation: Journalist

Uran Toktonazarovich Botobekov (Kyrgyz: Уран Токтоназарович Ботобеков; born May 1, 1967) is a Kyrgyz-American scholar, journalist, diplomat and publicist. He was an opposition activist until 2016 when he emigrated. He is also the author of more than 60 scientific and analytical articles on politics, religion, and economy of the post-Soviet Central Asian states. His scientific works were published in magazines in several countries.

== Early life ==
Botobekov was born on May 1, 1967, in the village of Jangy-Jol (now Malkaldy), in the Aksy District of Osh Region (now Jalal-Abad). His father, Toktonazar Botobekov (born February 15, 1938 – died September 14, 2006), was a farmer. His mother, Tajykan Botobekova (born February 2, 1947), is a pensioner who lives in the village of Malkaldy in the Aksy district of Jalal-Abad. He graduated from secondary school in his home village. In 1984, he enrolled in Kyrgyz State University's (later Kyrgyz National University) Department of Journalism, graduating in 1992.

== Career ==
From 1990 to 1993, he worked as a correspondent, and as the head of the Department of Social and Political Issues at the weekly "Kyrgyzstan Madaniyati" (The Culture of Kyrgyzstan) newspaper, then deputy editor of the educational newspaper "Kut Bilim", in Bishkek. In 1994, he worked as the head of the Press service of the Parliament of Kyrgyzstan.

In November 1994, he joined the diplomatic service. From 1994 to 1996, he worked as the head of the Information and Analytical Department at the Ministry of Foreign Affairs of the Kyrgyz Republic. From 1996 to 1998, he worked as the first secretary at the Kyrgyz Embassy in Ukraine. From 1999 to 2000, he worked as the main expert at the International Institute for Strategic Studies under the President of the Kyrgyz Republic.

From 2000 to 2001, he worked as a freelance analyst based in Bishkek, contributing to the international organization "Internews" (USA), the Carnegie Centre in Moscow (USA), and the Institute for War and Peace Reporting (UK). In 2001, he was invited to work in the Administration of the President of the Kyrgyz Republic.

He then led the President's press service, Askar Akayev, until 2003. From 2003 to 2005, he worked as the Advisor to the Kyrgyz Ambassador in Turkey. From 2006 to 2008, he worked as the head of the State Policy Department at the Agency for Civil Service Affairs of the Kyrgyz Republic.

From 2008 to 2010, he worked as deputy director of Organization and Control of Work at the Presidential Administration of the Kyrgyz Republic.

From the beginning of 2016 he became a contributing writer at The Diplomat as an expert on Political Islam in Central Asia and the Middle East.

From 2007 to 2009, Uran Botobekov was a research associate at the Institute of Philosophy and Political and Legal Studies at the National Academy of Sciences.

From 2010 to 2012, he worked as a Scientific Secretary to the President of the National Academy of Sciences.

In 2011, he successfully defended his PhD thesis in Political Science, "The Political Aspects of Islamic Radicalism in Central Asia".

Since 2016, Uran Botobekov worked as an Expert on Radical Islam, Independent Analyst Author, Scientific Researcher, and Contributor Writer of Modern Diplomacy.

In December 2017 he was elected as a Member of the advisory board of The Modern Diplomacy, a think-tank platform.

His scientific research focuses on the radical ideology of Sunni Wahhabism in Central Asia and the Middle East, as well as the Salafi-Jihadi movements underpinning such groups as al Qaeda and the Islamic State. Uran Botobekov's book "Think like Jihadist: Anatomy of Central Asian Salafi groups' was published by the Modern Diplomacy Platform in May 2019.

== Amongst the Kyrgyz opposition ==
From 2011 until the end of 2015, Botobekov engaged in opposition political activities in Kyrgyzstan.

In 2013, at the congress of the opposition political party Uluttar Birimdigi (The Unity of the Nations) he was elected as a deputy chairman of the party.

From 2012 to 2016, he was a member of the "National Opposition Movement of Kyrgyzstan," a coalition of opposition parties and politicians. Botobekov criticized the Kyrgyz government and the President of Kyrgyzstan for exerting pressure on freedom of speech and persecution of opposition journalists and politicians from 2012 to 2016.

He spoke strongly against seizure attempts of the popular Russian-language newspaper The Evening Bishkek (Vecherniy Bishkek) by people who allegedly had close relationships with government officials. In 2015, due to his active participation in opposition meetings for freedom of speech and human rights, he was shortly detained by the Kyrgyz law enforcement agencies.

The Freedom House report for June 2015 – May 2016: stated:

In June 2015, Uran Botobekov, a journalist for the news portal Kabarordo.kg, was fined KGS 1.8 million (US $28,000), for accusing a former deputy chief of staff of the president's office, of corruption. Botobekov left Kyrgyzstan for Turkey in January 2016, after which he was subject to a smear campaign initiated by Russian state TV, accusing the journalist of having to ties to former Kyrgyz President Bakiev.”

Thus, in January 2016, due to the ongoing political pressure upon him and after receiving some warnings about his possible murder, he temporarily lived in Turkey before moving to the US.

== Recognition ==
- On August 28, 2003, the President of the Kyrgyz Republic (UP No 284) awarded Uran Botobekov a diplomatic rank of "Ambassador Extraordinary and Plenipotentiary of the Kyrgyz Republic".
- On February 17, 2003, the Decree of the President of the Kyrgyz Republic (UP No 53) awarded him the Class rank of "State Counselor of the Kyrgyz Republic of the Third Class".

== Personal life ==
He is married to Aitbu Botobekova; they have a daughter Aruuke and two sons – Aituran and Elturan.

== Works ==
- Uran Botobekov – Academia.edu
- Top Uzbek Jihadist Leader Suffers for Loyalty to Al Qaeda. Modern Diplomacy, 10 July 2020
- Russian-Speaking Foreign Fighters In Iraq And Syria. TNTSITREP. Dec 2017. Archived November 20, 2018, at the Wayback Machine
- Central Asian Jihadi Groups Joined Taliban’s “Al-Fath Jihadi Operations”; Modern Diplomacy; May 18, 2019.
- The book "Think like Jihadist: Anatomy of Central Asian Salafi groups"; Modern Diplomacy; May 15, 2019.
- Uzbek’s Katibat al Tawhid wal Jihad changed its leader; Modern Diplomacy; April 19, 2019.
- Did Central Asia’s Jihadists Challenge Al Qaeda?; Modern Diplomacy; March 31, 2019.
- Al Qaeda and Central Asian Salafi-Jihadi Groups: From Bayat to Global Jihad; BBC World Service; January 28, 2019.
- Central Asian Jihadists Renew its Oath of Allegiance to Al Qaeda Leader; Modern Diplomacy; January 22, 2019.
- What is the Future of Malhama Tactical? Modern Diplomacy; December 29, 2018.
- How Al Qaeda and ISIS Teach Central Asian Children: Different Methods, Common Goals; Modern Diplomacy; December 11, 2018.
- Central Asian Jihadists between Turkey and Hayat Tahrir al-Sham; Modern Diplomacy; November 17, 2018.
- What will happen to the Central Asian jihadists in Idlib after the Sochi Memorandum?; Modern Diplomacy; September 20, 2018;
- Central Asian Jihadists under Al Qaeda’s & Taliban’s Strategic Ties; Modern Diplomacy; August 23, 2018;
- The armed conflict between ISIS and al Qaeda has reached its climax; Modern Diplomacy; August 1, 2018;
- Iran’s military activity strengthens al Qaeda in Syria; Modern Diplomacy; July 2, 2018;
- Al Nusrah Front returns to the embrace of Al Qaeda; Modern Diplomacy; June 11, 2018;
- China`s repression policy against Islam; Modern Diplomacy; May 29, 2018;
- Preventive Measures Against Lone Wolf Attacks During Ramadan; Modern Diplomacy; May 17, 2018;
- Who is a successor of al Qaeda in Central Asia?; BBC World Service; April 30, 2018.
- Katibat al Tawhid wal Jihad: A faithful follower of al-Qaeda from Central Asia; Modern Diplomacy; April 27, 2018;
- Jihadists of Katibat Imam al Bukhari are afraid of the US strike; Modern Diplomacy; April 5, 2018;
- New Ideological Tactics of al-Qaeda To Revive Its Power; Modern Diplomacy; March 13, 2018;
- Salafi-Jihadi group from Central Asia the Katibat Imam al Bukhari renewed its ideological doctrine of the Jihad; Modern Diplomacy; February 23, 2018;
- Central Asian Terrorist Groups Join Jihad Against U.S. After Declaration of Jerusalem as Israel's Capital. The Central Asia-Caucasus Analyst; February 16, 2018;
- Why Turkey is Amicable to Iraqi Kurds Yet Fights with Syrian Kurds; Modern Diplomacy; February 8, 2018;
- Islam Between Fatwa and Suicide Attack; Modern Diplomacy; Modern Diplomacy; January 22, 2018;
- Five Reasons Why Russia Fears Iranian Regime Fall; Modern Diplomacy; January 10, 2018;
- Central Asia’s Terrorist Groups Joined to the Jihad Against the US After Jerusalem Declared; Modern Diplomacy; December 24, 2017;
- China and the Turkestan Islamic Party: From Separatism to World Jihad; Modern Diplomacy; December 9, 2017;
- Silk diplomacy of the Celestial Empire against the Turkistan Islamic Party; Modern Diplomacy; December 2, 2017;
- How to Identify an Islamic Extremist Among the Crowd?; Modern Diplomacy; November 11, 2017;
- Member States of the Eurasian Economic Union Concerned Over Anti-Russian Sanctions of the USA; Modern Diplomacy, August 23, 2017.
- A reverse side of struggle against ISIS in Central Asia; Modern Diplomacy; July 21, 2017.
- "Russia Wants CSTO Allies to Deploy to Syria | Jamestown". Jamestown. July 10, 2017.
- Kyrgyz Court sentenced three participants Chinese Embassy Attack; Modern Diplomacy; July 6, 2017.
- "Kyrgyz court sentenced three participants of Chinese Embassy attack". The Politicon. July 5, 2017.
- Russia wants to use CSTO in Syria; Modern Diplomacy; June 27, 2017.
- "Russia wants to use the CSTO in Syria". The Politicon. June 29, 2017.
- "Taliban: New Challenges for Central Asia". The Diplomat. April 11, 2017.
- "Al-Qaeda and Islamic State Take Aim at China". The Diplomat. March 8, 2017.
- "The Transformation of Central Asian Jihadists in Syria". The Diplomat. February 21, 2017.
- "The Kyrgyz Baptists: A Case Study in Religious Persecution in Central Asia". The Diplomat. February 6, 2017.
- "What's Are China's Stakes in Syria?". The Diplomat. January 27, 2017.
- "The Central Asian Women on the Frontline of Jihad". The Diplomat. January 10, 2017.
- "ISIS Uses Central Asians for Suicide Missions". The Diplomat. December 1, 2016.
- "Russia's Syria Policy Upsets Central Asian Muslims". The Diplomat. October 18, 2016.
- "Al-Qaeda, the Turkestan Islamic Party, and the Bishkek Chinese Embassy Bombing". The Diplomat. September 29, 2016.
- "Central Asian Children Cast as ISIS Executioners". The Diplomat. September 20, 2016.
- "China's Nightmare: Xinjiang Jihadists Go Global". The Diplomat. August 17, 2016.
- "After Istanbul Attacks, Not Much Clarity on Central Asian Involvement". The Diplomat. July 15, 2016.
- "Is Central Asia Ready to Face ISIS?". The Diplomat. July 8, 2016.
- "Kyrgyzstan's Self-Defeating Conflict With Moderate Islam". The Diplomat. June 22, 2016.
- "Kyrgyzstan's Self-Defeating Conflict With Moderate Islam – ViewsWeek". ViewsWeek. June 21, 2016.
- "ISIS and Central Asia: A Shifting Recruiting Strategy". The Diplomat. May 17, 2016.
- "Lost childhood in the "Caliphate"". Fergananews.Com. May 20, 2016.
- The ideology of "Wahhabi dzhaamats" in Kyrgyzstan: stereotypes and adaptation to local conditions. // International scientific Journal "Science of Kazakhstan world." – Astana, 2010. – ed. No. 4 (32). – P. 127–13.
- Salafism in Central Asia. Where does caravan go? // Journal of the Institute of Philosophy and Political-Legal Studies, National Academy of Sciences "The human problems of our time." – Bishkek, 2010. – ed. No. 11. – P. 18–25.
- The causes and roots of Islamic radicalism. // Journal of the Institute of Philosophy and Political and Legal Studies National Academy of Sciences Kyrgyz Republic, “Humanitarian Challenges of our Time”., – Bishkek, 2010, edit. – No. 11. – P. 248–259.
- Religious-extremist party "Hizb ut-Tahrir al-Islami" in Kyrgyzstan. // The Republican scientific-theoretical journal "Science and New Technologies". – Bishkek, 2009. – No. 7 – P. 205–208.
- Interaction of religious in Kyrgyzstan. // Republican scientific-theoretical journal "Science and New Technologies". – Bishkek, 2009. – No. 7. – P. 222–223.
- Religious-extremist parties in Kyrgyzstan. // Scientific journal of KNU named after Jusup Balasagyn, "Social and human sciences." – Bishkek, 2009. – No. 5–6. – P. 121–123.
- Islamic radicalism: practical recommendations and solutions of problems. // Journal of BHU K.Karasaeva "Bulletin of the BHU." – Bishkek, 2010. – No. 2 (17). – P. 46–48.
- “Potential for Conflict in the Fergana Valley: Religious Extremism and Drug Trafficking”. // Multi-Dimensional Borders of Central Asia., Ed. by Martha Brill Olcott and Alexey Malashenko, Carnegie Moscow Center. – Moscow, Gandalf, 2000. – ed. No 2. – P. 44–55.
- Omelicheva, Mariya Y. (March 1, 2010). "The Ethnic Dimension of Religious Extremism and Terrorism in Central Asia" (PDF). International Political Science Review. 31 (2): 167–186. doi:10.1177/0192512110364738. hdl:1808/10499. ISSN 0192-5121. S2CID 155012013.
- How to unite western and Islamic values. // Journal «Dialog of EuroAsia» – Bishkek, publishing house «Basma», 2007. – P. 5–7.
- Kyrgyzstan is under influence of world religions. // Journal «Zamandash», – Bishkek, 2008 – No. 3 (56) March. – P. 6–8.
- What nationality Zaruhuddin Muhammad belongs to? // Journal «Dialog Avrasya». – Bishkek, publishing house «Basma», 2009. – P. 24–25.
- Mevlana that made a famous German poet Goethe Muslim. // Journal «Dialog Avrasya». – Bishkek, publishing house «Basma», 2008. – P. 20–22.
- Islamists Challenge Kyrgyz Authorities. // Magazine IWPR (Institute for War and Pease Reporting). – London, RCA No.44, March 14, 2001,
