= Tostu =

Tostu Тосту
- Location within Kyrgyzstan
- Coordinates: 41°34′43″N 71°40′02″E
- Country: Kyrgyzstan
- Region: Jalal-Abad
- District: Aksy
- Tostu: 2019

Population (2021)
  - Total: 1,665
- Time zone: UTC+6

Tostu (Kyrgyz: Тосту) is a village in Jalal-Abad Region of Kyrgyzstan. It is part of the Aksy District. The village was established in the area of Kashka-Suu rural settlement (aýyl ökmötü) in July 2019. Its population was 1,665 in 2021.
