= Dardak-Döbö =

Dardak-Döbö Дардак-Дөбө
- Location within Kyrgyzstan
- Coordinates: 41°37′58″N 72°04′00″E
- Country: Kyrgyzstan
- Region: Jalal-Abad
- District: Aksy
- Elevation: 880 m (2,890 ft)

Population (2021)
  - Total: 685
- Time zone: UTC+6

Dardak-Döbö (Kyrgyz: Дардак-Дөбө) is a village in Jalal-Abad Region of Kyrgyzstan. It is part of the Aksy District. The village's population was 685 in 2021.

== Population ==
Historical population
Year	Pop.	±% p.a.
2009	460	—
2021	685	+3.37%
Note: resident population; Sources:
