= Chortoq District =

Coordinates: 41.0689°N 71.8153°E

Chortoq
- District
- Chortoq tumani
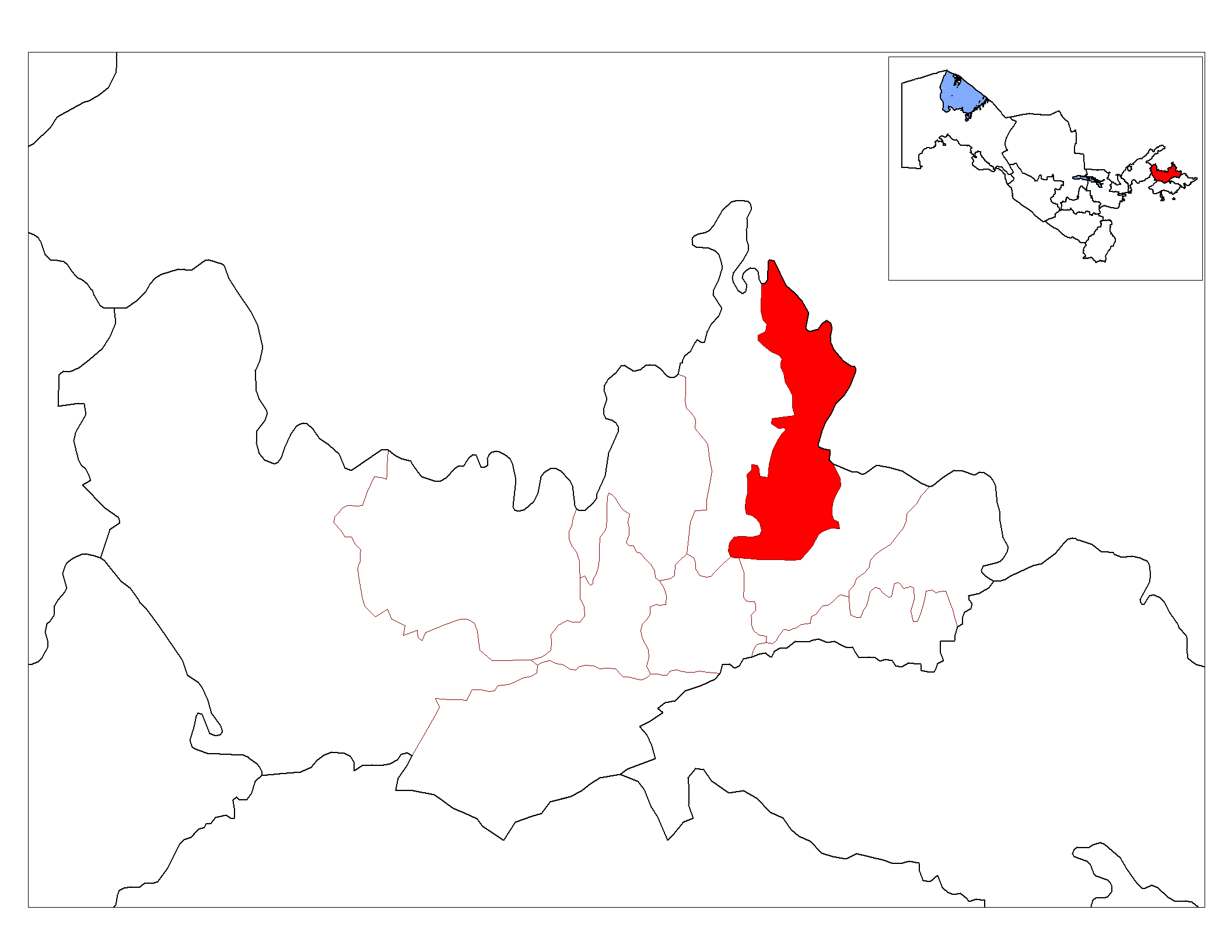
- Country: Uzbekistan
- Region: Namangan Region
- Capital: Chortoq
- Established: 1950

Area
  - Total: 377 km^{2} (146 sq mi)

Population (2021)
  - Total: 202,200
  - Density: 536/km^{2} (1,390/sq mi)
- Time zone: UTC+5 (UZT)

Chortoq is a district of Namangan Region in Uzbekistan. The capital lies at the city Chortoq. Its area is 377 km^{2}. Its population is 202,200 (2021 est.).

The district consists of one city (Chortoq), 12 urban-type settlements (Muchum, Koroskon, Koʻshan, Ayqiron, Alixon, Pastki Peshqoʻrgʻon, Yuqori Peshqoʻrgʻon, Ora ariq, Baliqli koʻl, Xazratishox) and 9 rural communities.
