= Türdük =

Türdük Түрдүк
- Location in Kyrgyzstan
- Coordinates: 41°46′N 72°05′E
- Country: Kyrgyzstan
- Region: Jalal-Abad
- District: Aksy

Population (2021)
  - Total: 215

Türdük (Kyrgyz: Түрдүк) is a mountain village in Jalal-Abad Region, Kyrgyzstan. It lies at the confluence of the rivers Türdük and Jaryk-Tash. It is part of the Aksy District. Its population was 215 in 2021.
