= Kürp =

Kürp Күрп
- Location within Kyrgyzstan
- Coordinates: 41°31′20″N 72°19′50″E
- Country: Kyrgyzstan
- Region: Jalal-Abad Region
- District: Aksy District

Population (2021)
  - Total: 131
- Time zone: UTC+6

Kürp is a village in Jalal-Abad Region of Kyrgyzstan. It is part of the Aksy District. Its population was 131 in 2021.
