= Kashka-Suu, Aksy =

Kashka-Suu Кашка-Суу
- Location within Kyrgyzstan
- Coordinates: 41°34′50″N 71°40′32″E
- Country: Kyrgyzstan
- Region: Jalal-Abad
- District: Aksy

Population (2021)
  - Total: 938
- Time zone: UTC+6

Kashka-Suu (Kyrgyz: Кашка-Суу) is a village in the Jalal-Abad Region of Kyrgyzstan. It is part of the Aksy District. The village's population was 938 in 2021.

== Population ==
Five new settlements: Tostu, Tuyuk-Jar, Ölöng-Bulak, Charbak and Kara-Bashat were established in the area of Kashka-Suu rural settlement (aýyl ökmötü) in July 2019. As a result, the population of Kashka-Suu comprised 938 in 2021 as compared with 4,025 according to the 2009 Census.

Historical population
Year	Pop.	±% p.a.
2009	4,025	—
2021	938	−11.43%
Note: resident population; Sources:
