= Baykashka-Terek =

Baykashka-Terek Байкашка-Терек
- Location within Kyrgyzstan
- Coordinates: 41°39′47″N 71°56′22″E
- Country: Kyrgyzstan
- Region: Jalal-Abad
- District: Aksy
- Elevation: 1,040 m (3,410 ft)

Population (2021)
  - Total: 1,096
- Time zone: UTC+6

Baykashka-Terek (Kyrgyz: Байкашка-Терек) is a village in Jalal-Abad Region of Kyrgyzstan. It is part of the Aksy District. The village's population was 1,096 in 2021.

== Population ==
Historical population
Year	Pop.	±% p.a.
2009	418	—
2021	1,096	+8.36%
Note: resident population; Sources:
