= Chortoq =

Chortoq Uzbek: Chortoq
- City
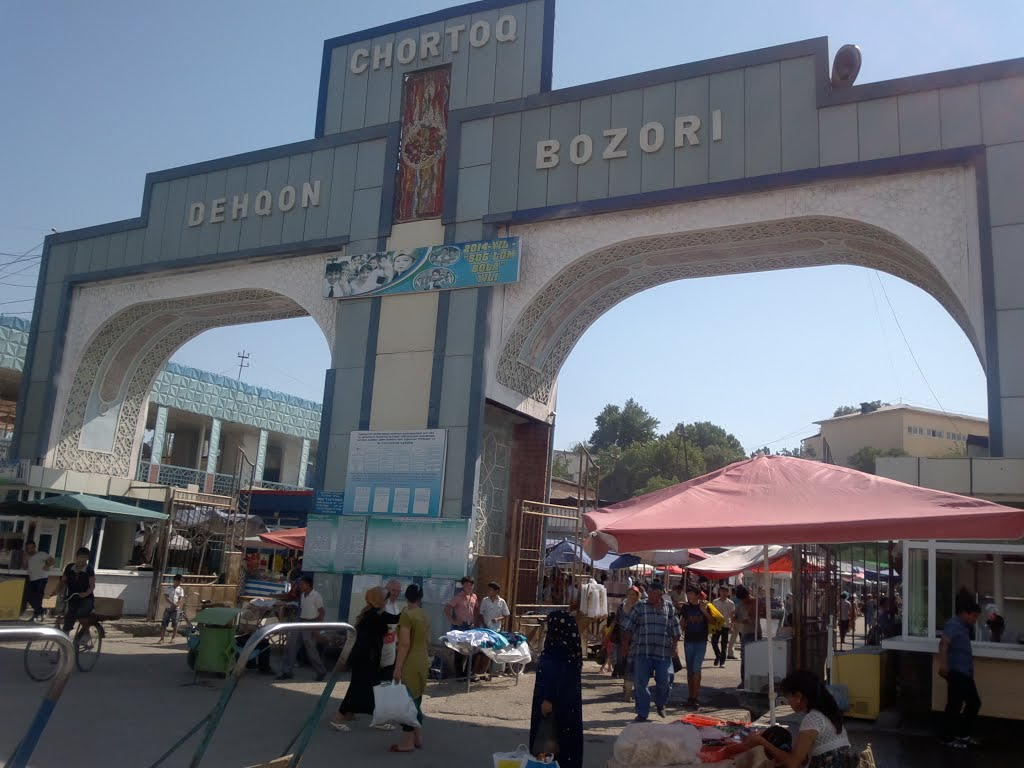
- Chortoq Bazaar

- Location in Uzbekistan
- Coordinates: 41°04′08″N 71°48′55″E
- Country: Uzbekistan
- Region: Namangan Region
- District: Chortoq District
- Town status: 1976 (town status), known from II century

Population (2016)
  - Total: 53,400
- Time zone: UTC+5 (UZT)
- Postal code: 117300
- Area code: +998 69 XX-XX-XXX

Chortoq (Uzbek: Chortoq — 4 hills) is a city in Namangan Region, Uzbekistan. It is the administrative center of Chortoq District.

== Etymology ==
The name "Chortoq" means "4 hills" (from the Persian "chor" - 4 and the Turkic "togh, toq" - hill, mountain), which indicates 4 artificially created hills (hills) in the city, which served at one time for military-defensive and warning purposes.

== Geography ==
Located in northern part of the Ferghana Valley (Fargʻona vodiysi) in eastern Uzbekistan.

== Population ==
Its population is 53,400 (2016).
