= Avletim =

Avletim Авлетим
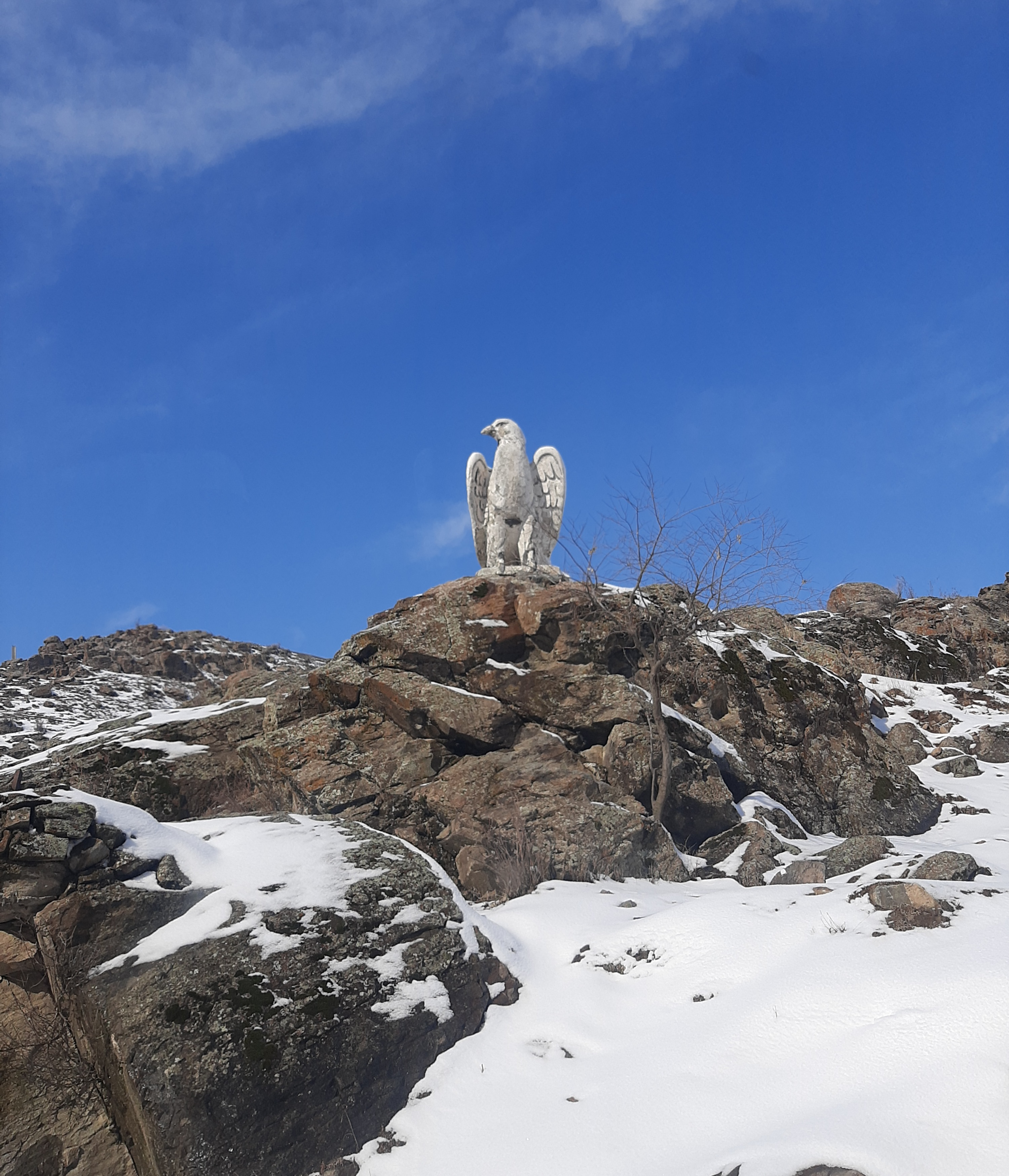
- Eagle monument in Avletim

- Location within Kyrgyzstan
- Coordinates: 41°38′0″N 71°56′0″E
- Country: Kyrgyzstan
- Region: Jalal-Abad Region
- District: Aksy District

Population (2021)
  - Total: 2,732

Avletim (Kyrgyz: Авлетим, also Афлатун - Aflatun) is a village in Jalal-Abad Region of Kyrgyzstan. Its population was 2,732 in 2021.

== Sources ==
- Aflatun Map – Maplandia.com
