= Kojata (river) =

- Location within Kyrgyzstan

Location
- Country: Kyrgyzstan

Physical characteristics
- Mouth: Kara-Suu
  - coordinates: 41°39′50″N 72°02′57″E
- Length: 18 km (11 mi)
- Basin size: 280 km^{2} (110 sq mi)

Basin features
- Progression: Kara-Suu→ Naryn→ Syr Darya→ North Aral Sea

The Kojata (Kyrgyz: Кожата) is a right tributary of the Kara-Suu in Jalal-Abad Region, Kyrgyzstan. Its source is in the Chatkal Range, western Tian Shan mountains, and is fed by the Toskool, which flows out of Lake Sary-Chelek. It is 18 km long and has a drainage basin of 280 km^{2}. It discharges into the Kara-Suu near Kyzyl-Tuu.
