= Bospiek =

Bospiek Kyrgyz: Боспиек
- Location within Kyrgyzstan
- Coordinates: 41°32′54″N 71°49′51″E
- Country: Kyrgyzstan
- Region: Jalal-Abad Region
- District: Aksy District

Population (2021)
  - Total: 1,589
- Time zone: UTC+6

Bospiek (Kyrgyz: Боспиек) is a village in the Jalal-Abad Region of Kyrgyzstan. It is part of the Aksy District. Its population was 1,295 in 2021.
