= Naryn Castle, Nain =

Castle in Nain, Iran

Coordinates: 32.8675°N 53.0896°E

Naryn Castle
- نارین قلعه
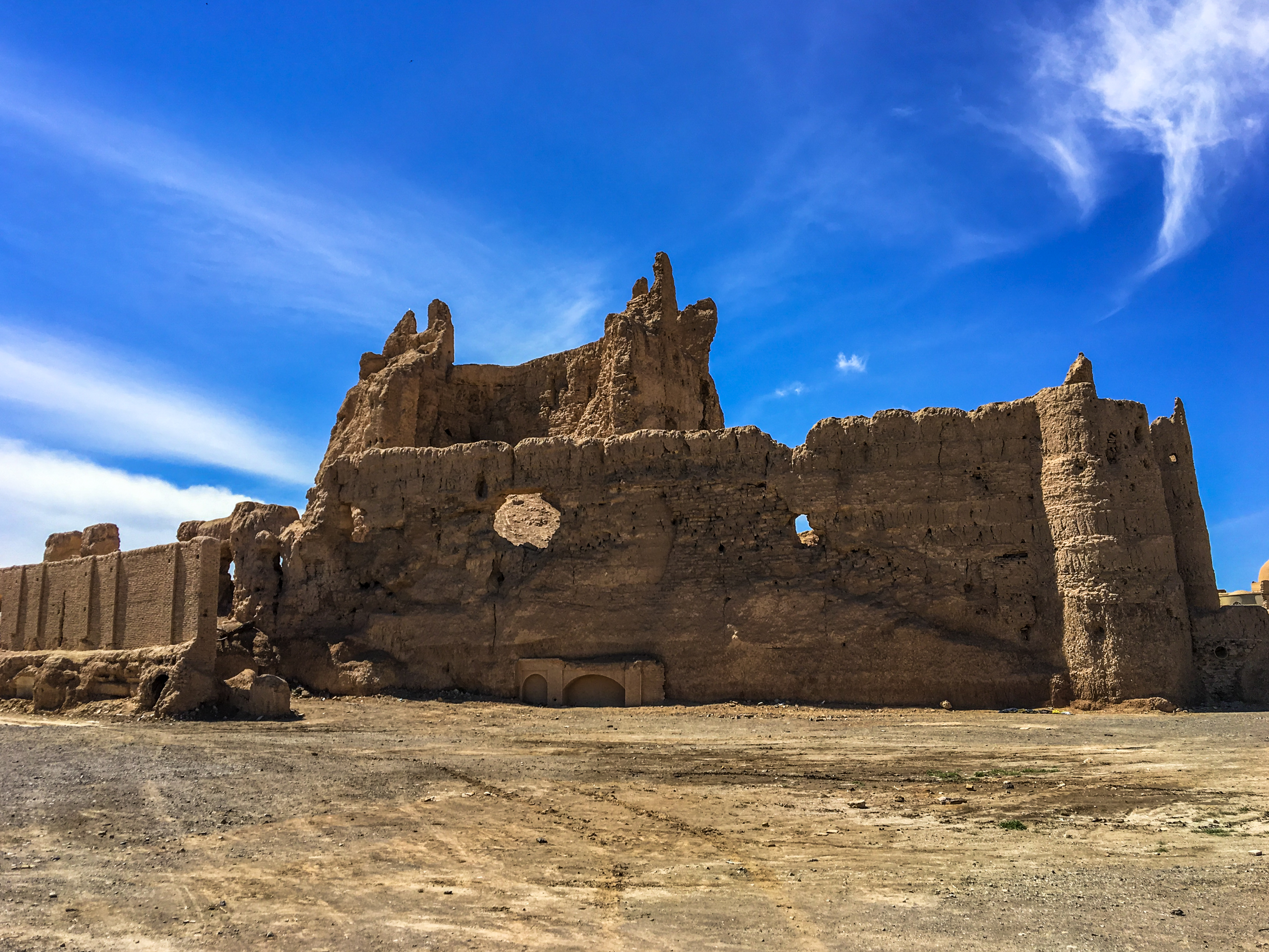
- Interactive map of the Naryn Castle area

General information
- Type: Castle
- Architectural style: Iranian architecture
- Location: Nain, Iran

Naryn Castle or Narenj Castle is a castle in the city of Nain, Iran, and is one of the attractions of Nain County. This castle was built by the Parthian Empire.

== Gallery ==
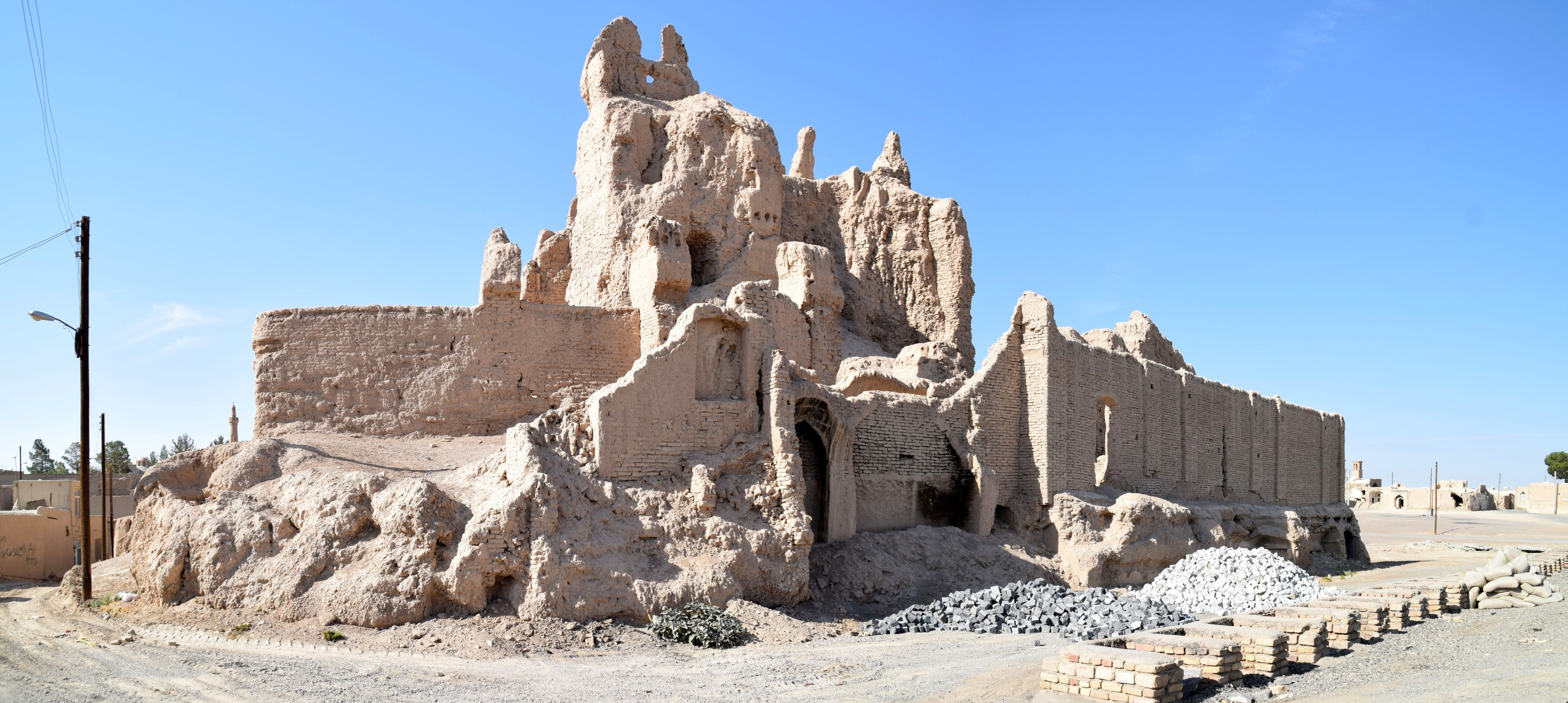

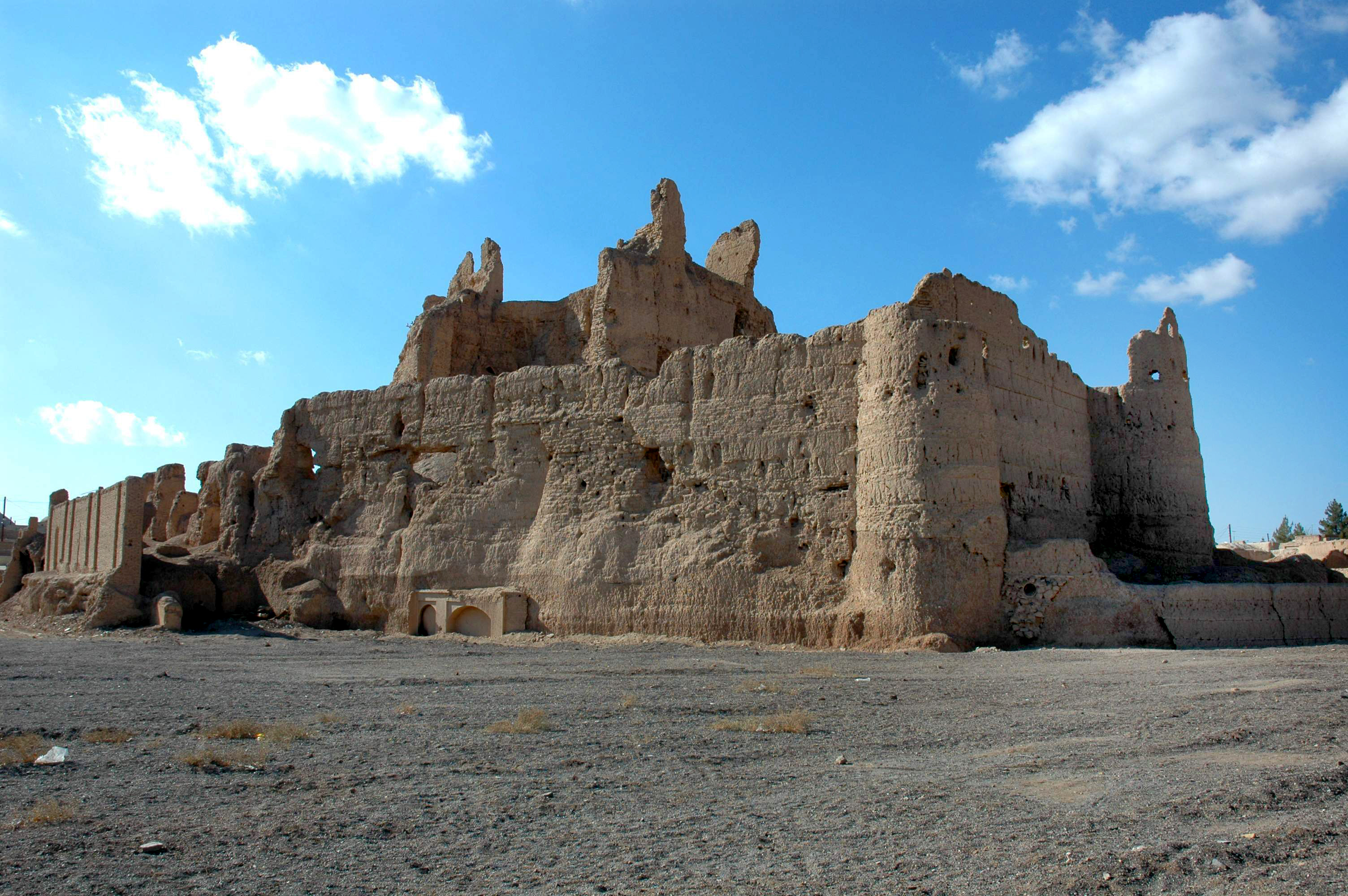

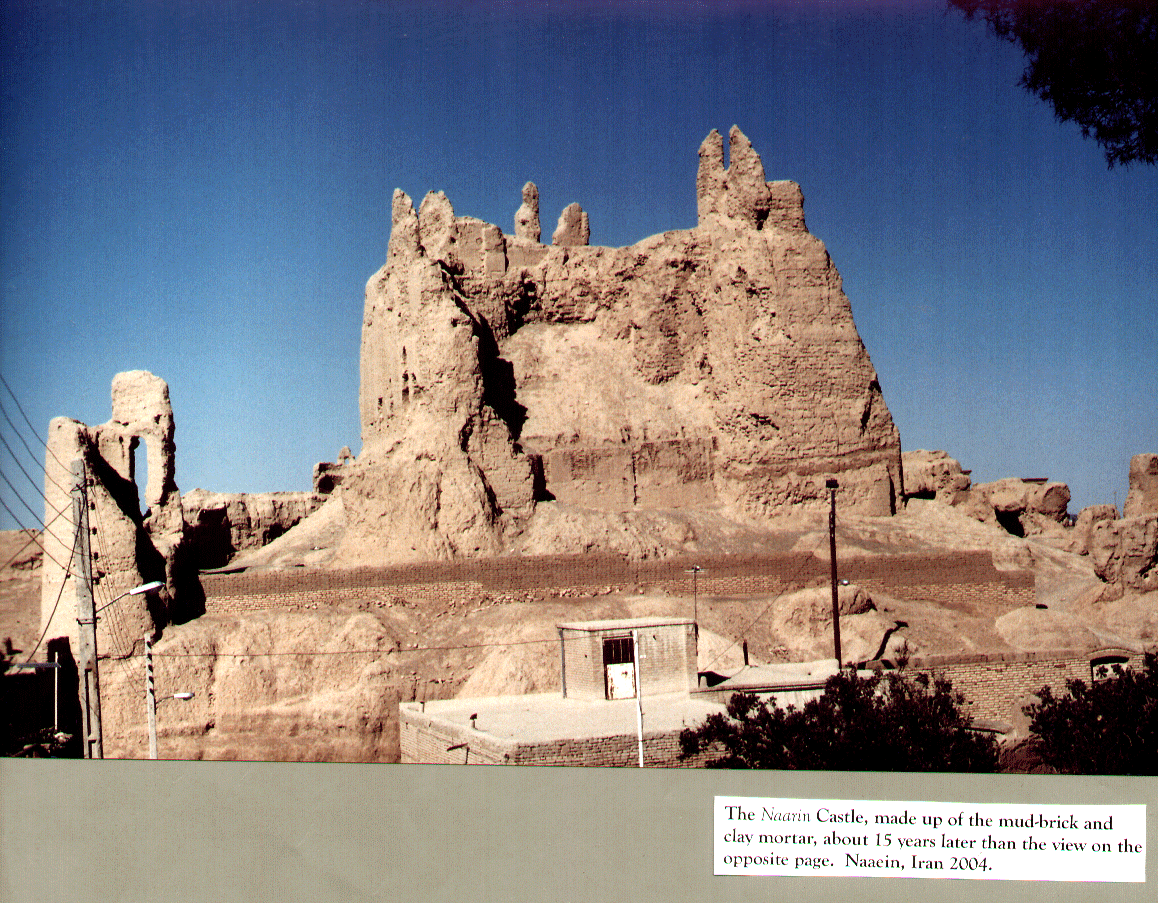

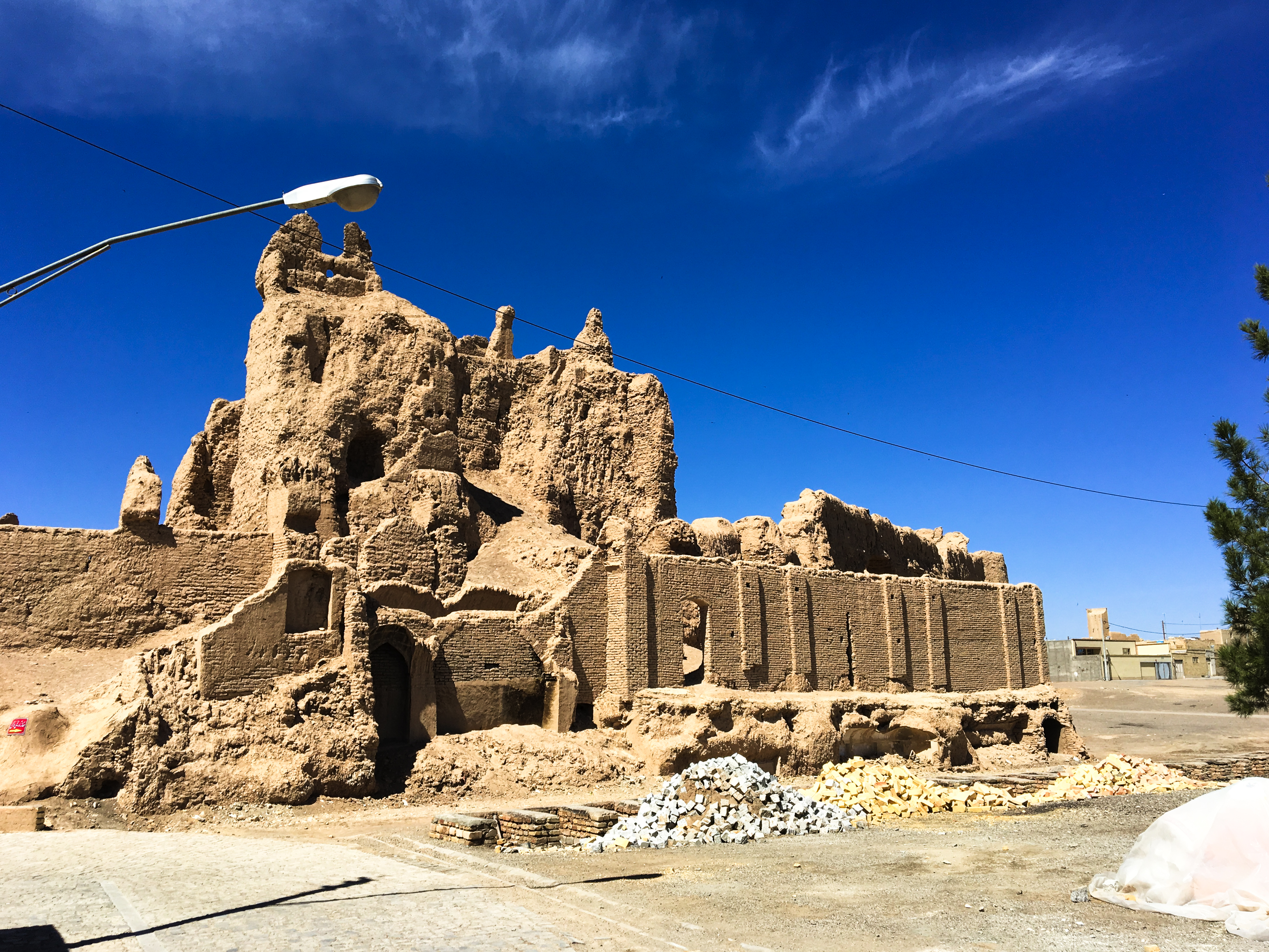

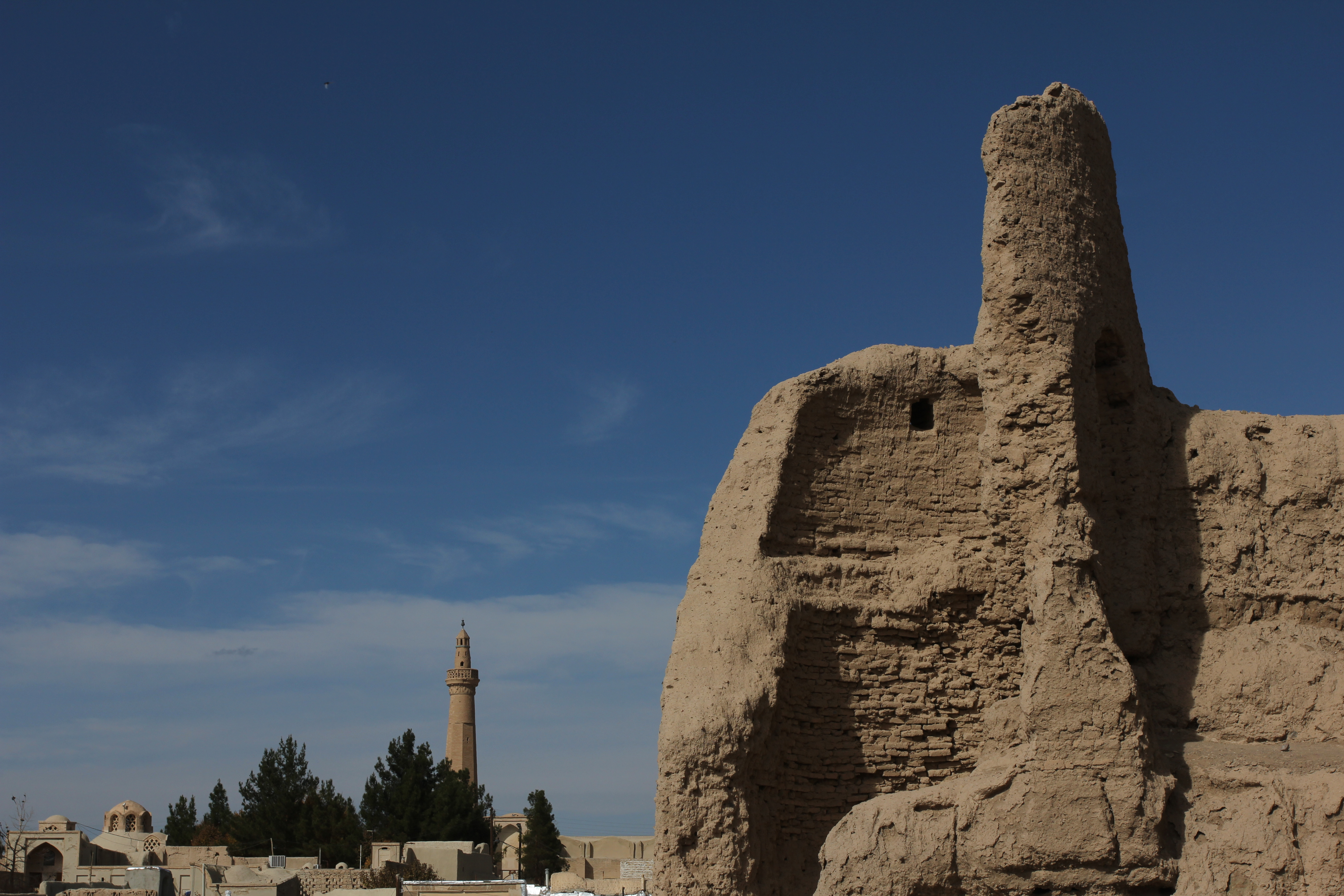

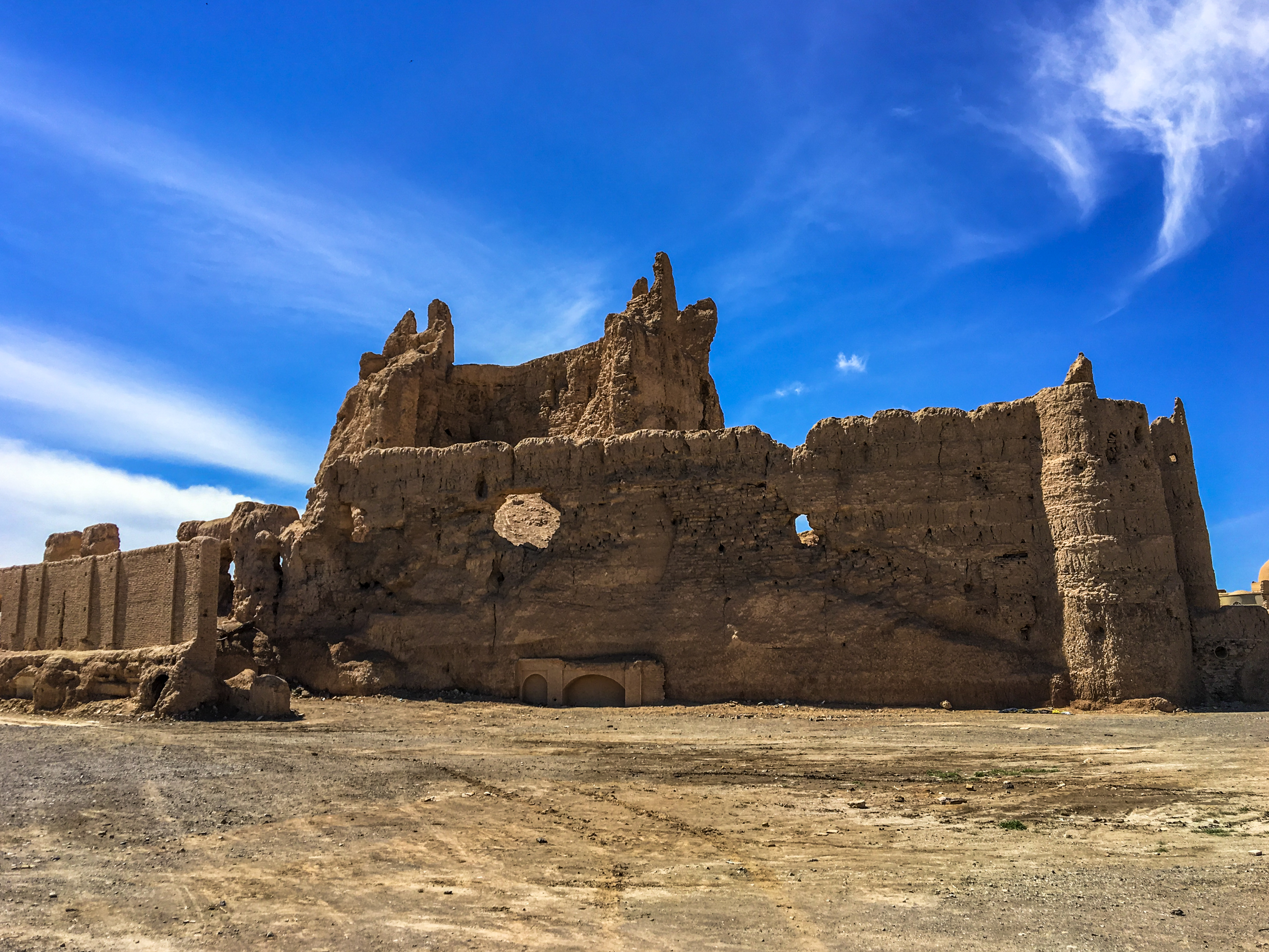

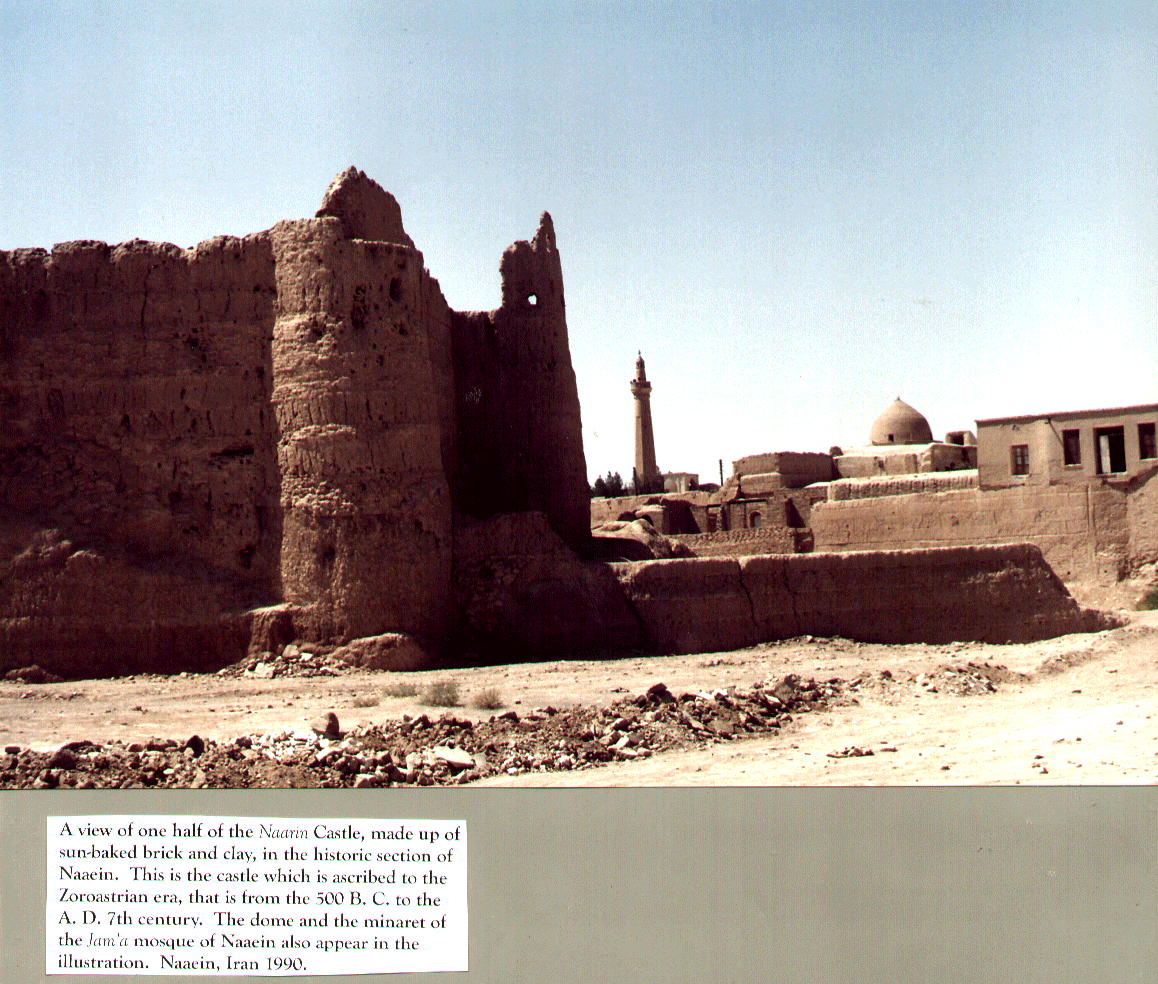

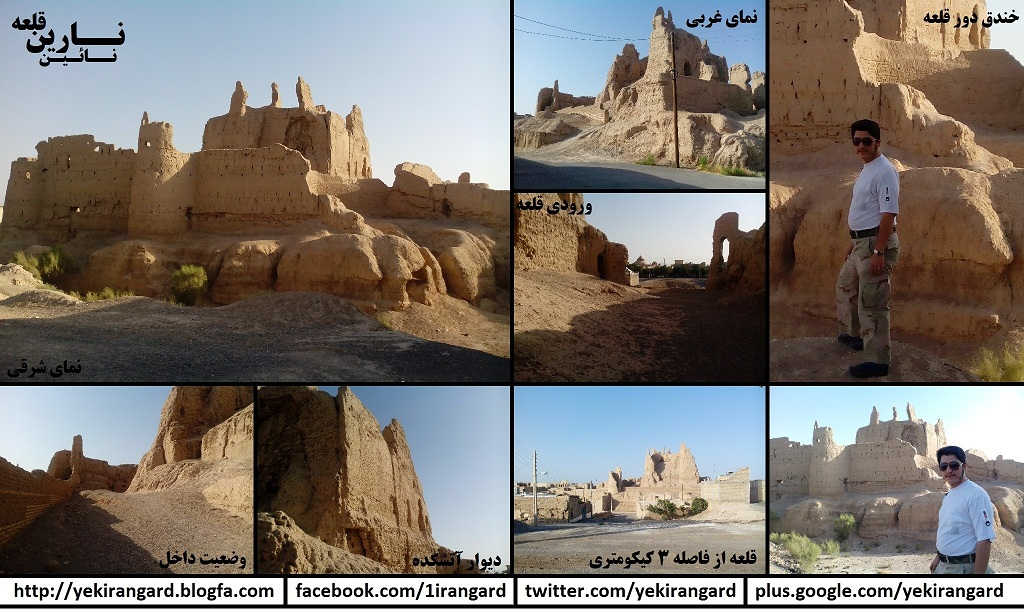
