= Arkit, Republic of Dagestan =

Arkit Аркит Әркит АхьитI
- Selo
- Location within Republic of Dagestan Location within Russia
- Coordinates: 41°56′N 48°00′E
- Country: Russia
- Region: Republic of Dagestan
- District: Tabasaransky District
- Time zone: UTC+3:00

Arkit (Russian: Аркит; Azerbaijani: Әркит, Ərkit; Tabassaran: АхьитI) is a rural locality (a selo) and the administrative centre of Arkitsky Selsoviet, Tabasaransky District, Republic of Dagestan, Russia. Population: 608 (2010 census); 790 (2002 census); 569 (1989 Soviet census).

== Geography ==
Arkit is located 11 km (6.8 mi) east of Khuchni (the district's administrative centre) by road. Rishchul is the nearest rural locality.
