= Munduz =

Manduz Мундуз
- Location within Kyrgyzstan
- Coordinates: 41°27′0″N 71°57′0″E
- Country: Kyrgyzstan
- Region: Jalal-Abad Region
- District: Aksy District
- Elevation: 1,403 m (4,603 ft)

Population (2021)
  - Total: 1,285
- Time zone: UTC+6

Old lady in Munduz village, 2011

Munduz is a village in the Jalal-Abad Region of Kyrgyzstan. It is part of the Aksy District. Its population was 1,285 in 2021.
