= Kyzyl-Jar, Aksy =

Kyzyl-Jar Кызыл-Жар
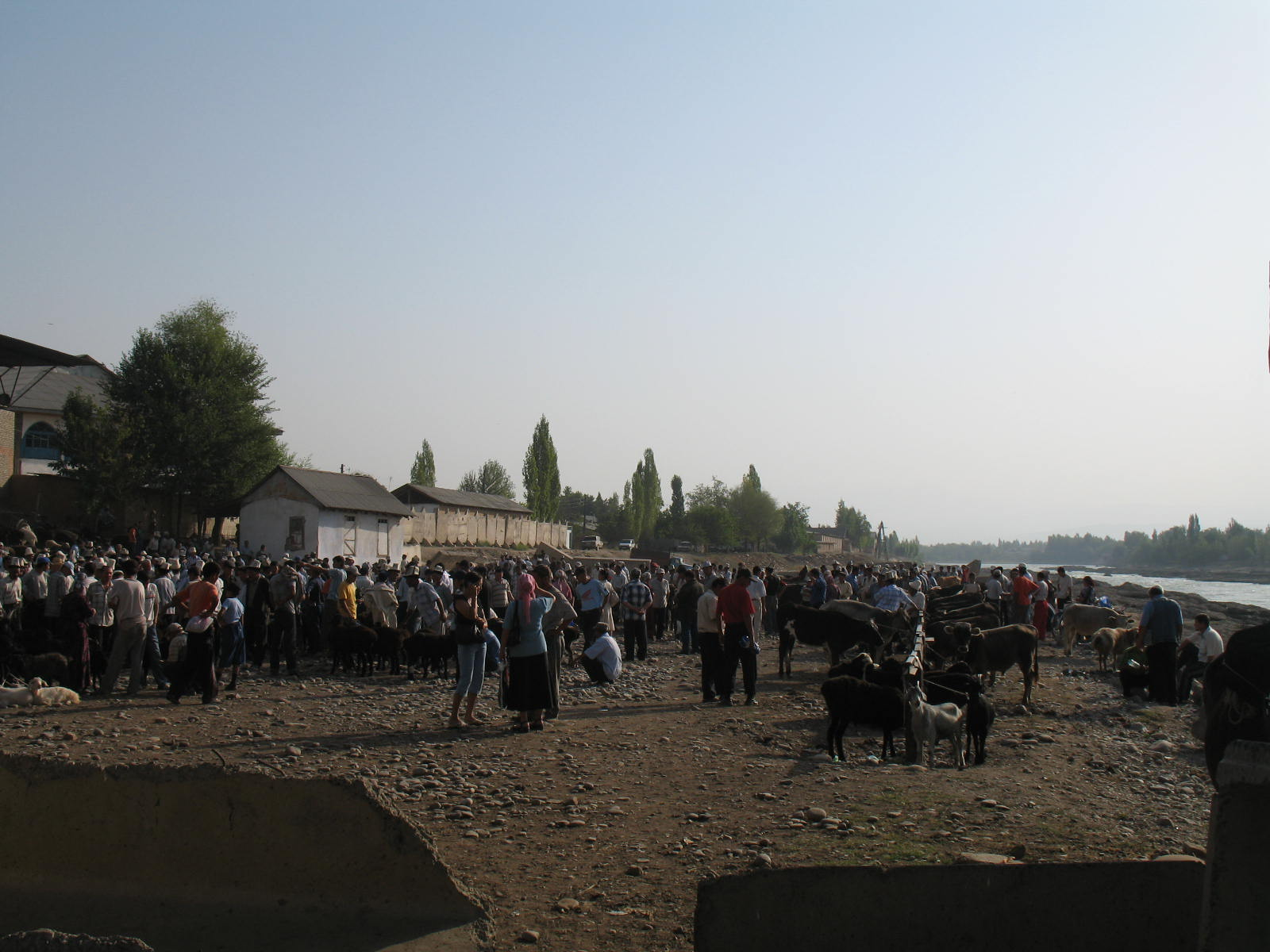
- Animal bazaar in Kyzyl-Jar

- Location within Kyrgyzstan
- Coordinates: 41°08′50″N 72°05′30″E
- Country: Kyrgyzstan
- Region: Jalal-Abad Region
- District: Aksy District

Population (2021)
  - Total: 7,074
- Time zone: UTC+6

Kyzyl-Jar (also Kyzyl-Dzhar, Kyrgyz: Кызыл-Жар, pronounced [qɯzɯld͡ʒɑ́r], literally "Red cliff") is a village in Aksy District of Jalal-Abad Region in Kyrgyzstan. Its population was 7,074 in 2021. The river Naryn separates the village from Uch-Kurgan, Uzbekistan, not far from Namangan. The area and even the village are still sometimes referred to as Uch-Korgon, presumably due to the lumping together of the two villages during Soviet times. Until 2004, the rural community of Nazaraliev, of which Kyzyl-Jar is part, was named Uchkorgon. The village is located on the edge of the Fergana Valley and as such is a heavy watermelon, melon, and cotton-producing area.

== Population ==
Historical population
Year	Pop.	±% p.a.
2009	5,016	—
2021	7,074	+2.91%
Note: resident population; Sources:
