= Sary-Kashka =

Sary-Kashka Сары-Кашка
- Location within Kyrgyzstan
- Coordinates: 41°24′30″N 71°52′53″E
- Country: Kyrgyzstan
- Region: Jalal-Abad
- District: Aksy
- Elevation: 1,090 m (3,580 ft)

Population (2021)
  - Total: 2,979
- Time zone: UTC+6

Sary-Kashka (Kyrgyz: Сары-Кашка) is a village in Jalal-Abad Region of Kyrgyzstan. It is part of the Aksy District. The village's population was 2,979 in 2021.

== Population ==
Historical population
Year	Pop.	±% p.a.
2009	3,310	—
2021	2,979	−0.87%
Note: resident population; Sources:
