= Ak-Jol, Jalal-Abad =

Ak-Jol
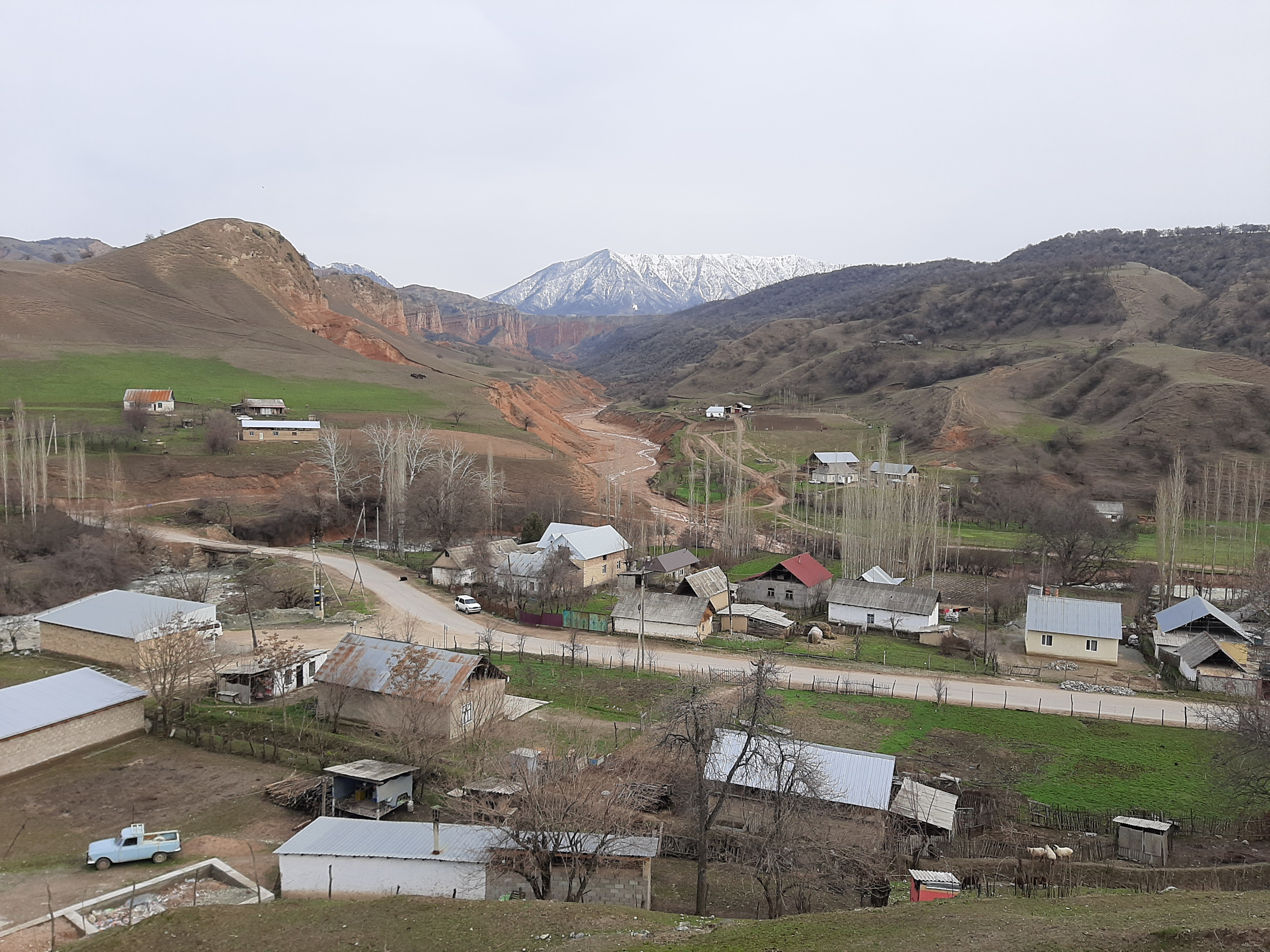

- Location within Kyrgyzstan
- Coordinates: 41°34′0″N 72°11′50″E
- Country: Kyrgyzstan
- Region: Jalal-Abad Region
- District: Aksy District

Population (2021)
  - Total: 3,046
- Time zone: UTC+6

Ak-Jol is a village in Jalal-Abad Region of Kyrgyzstan. It is part of the Aksy District. Its population was 3,046 in 2021.
