= Chaldybar =

Chaldybar Чалдыбар
- Location in Kyrgyzstan
- Coordinates: 41°43′N 72°3′E
- Country: Kyrgyzstan
- Region: Jalal-Abad Region
- District: Aksy District
- Elevation: 1,353 m (4,439 ft)

Population (2021)
  - Total: 1,082

Chaldybar is a village in Jalal-Abad Region, in Kyrgyzstan. Its population was 1,082 in 2021.
