= Kerben, Kyrgyzstan =

Kerben Кербен
- Coat of arms

- Location within Kyrgyzstan
- Coordinates: 41°30′0″N 71°45′0″E
- Country: Kyrgyzstan
- Region: Jalal-Abad Region
- District: Aksy District
- Elevation: 1,296 m (4,252 ft)

Population (2021)
  - Total: 18,695
- Time zone: UTC+6

Kerben (Kyrgyz: Кербен) is a town in Jalal-Abad Region of Kyrgyzstan. Its population was 18,695 in 2021. It is the administrative centre of Aksy District.

Kerben is located in northwestern Kyrgyzstan, some 220 km from the regional centre Jalal-Abad and 60 km from the Tash-Kömür town railway. It is located in the centre of the Aksy region, at a height of 1,200 meters above sea level. To the southwest Kerben borders with the village of Nanai in Uzbekistan.

Kerben Airport has weekly flights to Bishkek, Osh and Jalal-Abad.

== History ==
In 2002, police fired into a crowd of unarmed demonstrators, killing six. The demonstrations were triggered by a political dispute between Azimbek Beknazarov and Askar Akayev over an agreement with China about ceding some territory in the Tien Shan range. Local officials and police officers suspected of being involved in the shootings were later acquitted or pardoned.

== Population ==
Historical population
Year	Pop.	±% p.a.
2009	14,141	—
2021	18,695	+2.35%
Note: resident population; Sources:
