= Aksy District =

Coordinates: 41°30′N 71°45′E

Aksy Аксы району
- District
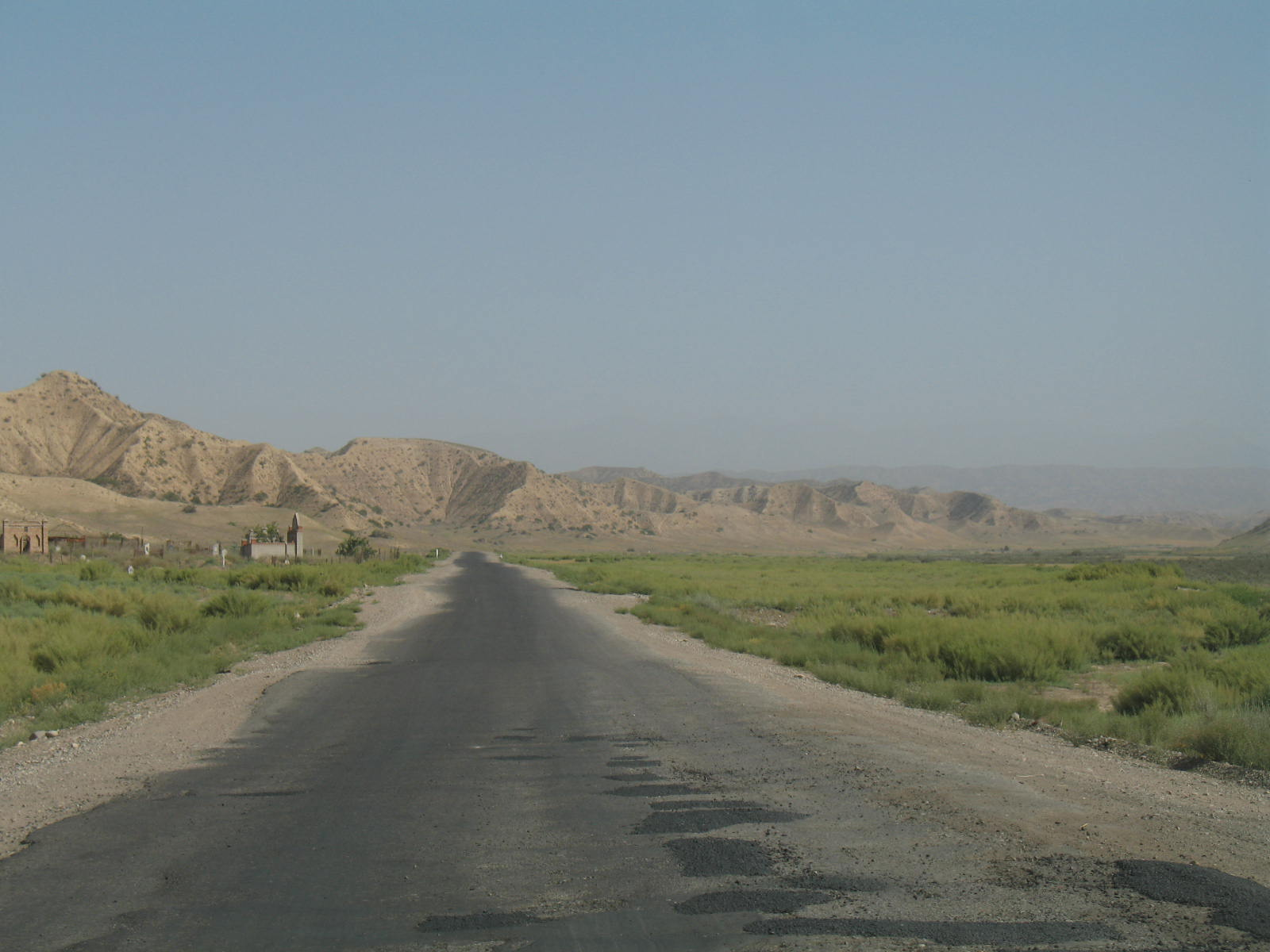

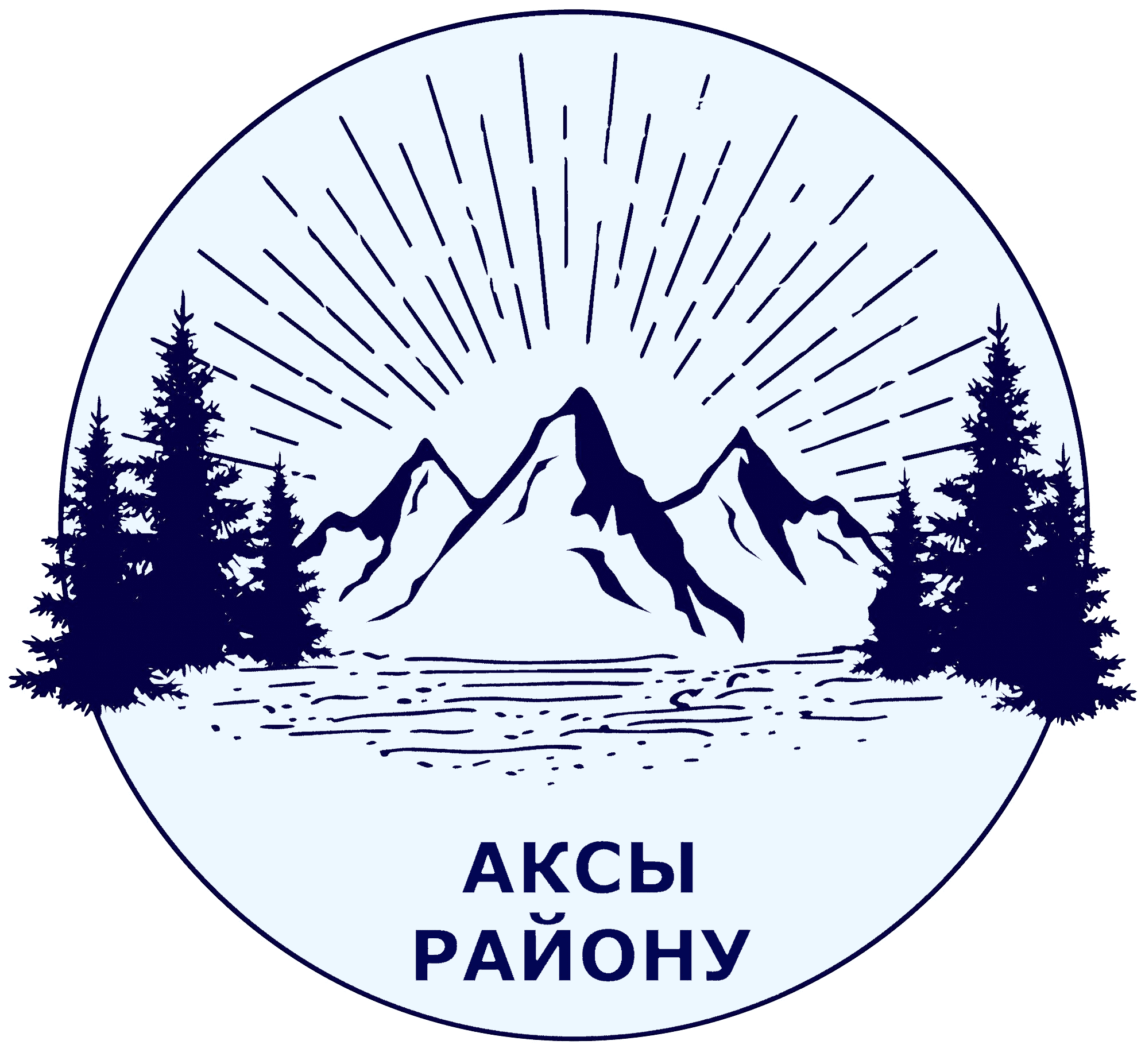
- Coat of arms

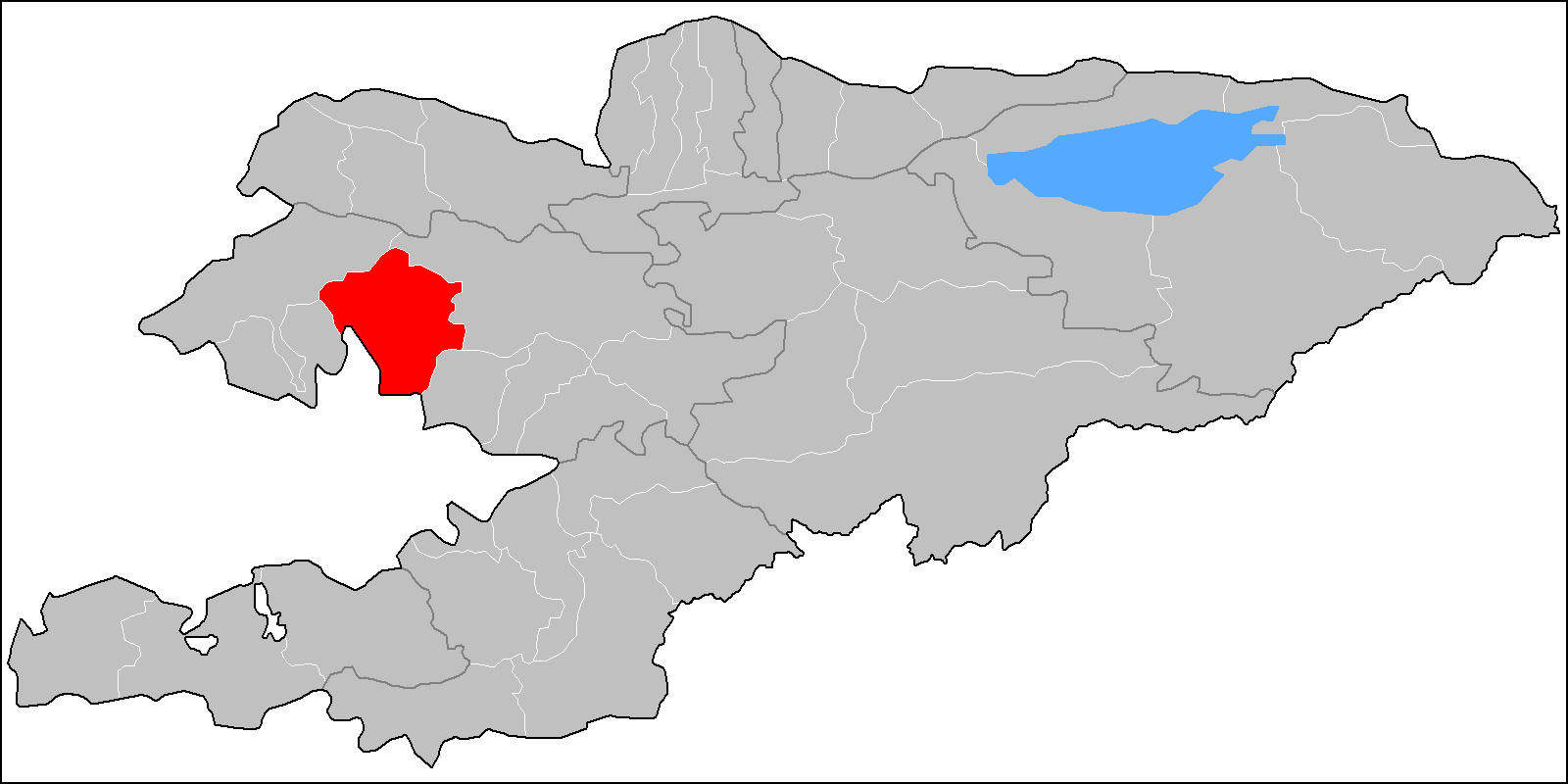
- Country: Kyrgyzstan
- Region: Jalal-Abad Region

Area
  - Total: 4,578 km^{2} (1,768 sq mi)

Population (2021)
  - Total: 137,103
  - Density: 29.95/km^{2} (77.57/sq mi)
- Time zone: UTC+6

Aksy (Kyrgyz: Аксы району) is a district of Jalal-Abad Region in western Kyrgyzstan. The seat lies at Kerben. Its area is 4,578 km^{2} (1,768 sq mi), and its resident population was 137,103 in 2021.

== History ==
Aksy District was established in 1936 as Tash-Kömür District. In 1943, when Tash-Kömür was given city status, the district was renamed Jangy-Jol District, and the administrative seat was moved to the village Jangy-Jol. It absorbed the Kerben District in 1958 (seat moved to Kerben), and Ala-Buka and Chatkal Districts in 1963. Ala-Buka and Chatkal Districts were re-established in 1969. In 1991 Jangy-Jol District was renamed into Aksy District.

== Population ==
Historical population
Year	Pop.	±% p.a.
1970	49,397	—
1979	60,404	+2.26%
1989	75,602	+2.27%
1999	94,631	+2.27%
2009	113,010	+1.79%
2021	137,103	+1.62%
Note: resident population; Sources:

== Populated places ==
In total, Aksy District includes 1 town and 78 villages in 11 rural communities (ayyl aymagy). Each rural community can consist of one or several villages. The rural communities and settlements in the Aksy District are:

1. The town of Kerben (incl. Kurulush, Kuluk-Döbö, Ak-Döbö, Jetigen, Mamay and Ustukan)
2. Ak-Jol (seat: Ak-Jol; incl. Jolborstu, Kara-Tyt, Kechüü, Raykomol, Tegene, Kyzyl-Beyit, Kürp and Razan-Say)
3. Ak-Suu (seat: Ak-Suu; incl. Ak-Say, Korgon-Döbö, Kum-Bulung, Mor-Bulak, Töö-Basty)
4. Avletim (seat: Avletim; incl. Baykashka-Terek, Deres-Say, Janggaktuu-Bulak, It-Agar, Korgon, Mukur, Tegirmen-Say and Tovar-Say)
5. Jangy-Jol (seat: Jangy-Jol; incl. Koy-Tash, Tashtak and Ters)
6. Jerge-Tal (seat: Jerge-Tal; incl. Bospiek and Kyzyl-Kapchygay)
7. Kara-Jygach (seat: Kara-Jygach; incl. Dardak-Döbö, Kara-Oy, Syny, Tor-Kamysh and Charba)
8. Kara-Suu (seat: Top-Janggak; incl. Juzumjan, Kara-Suu, Kezart, Kyzyl-Köl, Say-Bulung, Türdük, Chaldybar and Chat)
9. Kashka-Suu (seat: Kashka-Suu; incl. Jangy-Ayyl, Kara-Döbö, Sogot, Tostu, Tuyuk-Jar, Ölöng-Bulak, Charbak and Kara-Bashat)
10. Kyzyl-Tuu (seat: Kyzyl-Tuu; incl. Arkyt, Jylgyn and Jol-Say)
11. Mavlyanov (seat: Atana; incl. Munduz, Sary-Kashka, Semet, Toruk, Uluk, Chie, Tash-Jar and Janggak)
12. Uch-Korgon (seat: Kyzyl-Jar; incl. Jyl-Kol, Kum and Naryn)
Settlements of the Aksy District.

== Prominent people from the Aksy district ==
There were several prominent people from the Aksy area of the Jalal-Abad region in Kyrgyzstan.

In the 19th century: prominent statesman Nuzup Mingbashy (Yusuf Mingbashi) of the Kokand khanate, poet Jengijok, etc.

In the 20th century: a poet Temirkul Umetaliev, a writer Tologon Kasymbek, etc.

At the end of the 20th century - beginning of the 21st century: politicians Topchubek Turgunaliev, Azimbek Beknazarov, a historian Tashmanbet Kenensariev, a journalist Uran Toktonazarovich Botobekov, etc.
