= Roads in Kyrgyzstan =

A list of roads in Kyrgyzstan.

== Systems ==
The highways in Kyrgyzstan are divided into two groups, based on the level of their significance whose names differ by a code letter.

- ЭМ – highways of international significance (Kyrgyz: Эл аралык магистраль, El aralık magistral); ЭМ-01 to ЭМ-23
- М – highways of national significance (Kyrgyz: Мамлекеттик магистраль, Mamlekettik magistral); М-001 to М-122

== International Highways ==
Road	Direction	Previous Designation	Length
ЭМ-01	Bishkek - Lugovoy - Border of Kazakhstan ( KZ08-06 )	М-39	10.7 km
ЭМ-02	Bishkek Bypass	М-39	24.3 km
ЭМ-03	Kara-Balta ( ЭМ-04 ) - Chaldybar - Border of Kazakhstan ( KZ08-07 )	М-39	31.5 km
ЭМ-04	Bishkek - Kara-Balta ( ЭМ-03 ) - Töö Ashuu Pass ( ЭМ-18 ) - Manas (Jalal-Abad) - Özgön ( ЭМ-19 ) - Osh	М-39/М-41/А-370	650.5 km
ЭМ-05	Osh - Sary-Tash ( ЭМ-06 , ЭМ-07 ) - Irkeshtam - Border of China	М-41/А-371	225 km
ЭМ-06	Sary-Tash ( ЭМ-05 , ЭМ-07 ) - Karamyk - Border of Tajikistan ( РБ07 )	А-372	136 km
ЭМ-07	Sary-Tash ( ЭМ-05 , ЭМ-06 ) - Kyzylart Pass - Border of Tajikistan ( РБ05 )	М-41	44.3 km
ЭМ-08	Tüp ( ЭМ-09 ) - Sary-Tologoy - Border of Kazakhstan ( KZ05-06 )	А-362	75.5 km
ЭМ-09	Balykchy ( ЭМ-11 ) - Anan'yevo - Tüp ( ЭМ-08 ) - Karakol ( ЭМ-10 )	А-363	222 km
ЭМ-10	Balykchy ( ЭМ-11 ) - Bökönbaev - Karakol ( ЭМ-09 )	А-363	218 km
ЭМ-11	Bishkek - Tokmok - ЭМ-20 - Balykchy ( ЭМ-09 , ЭМ-10 ) - Kochkor ( ЭМ-18 ) - Naryn - Torugart Pass - Border of China	А-365	534 km
ЭМ-12	Manas (Jalal-Abad) - Kazarman (Under construction as part of "Alternative North-South Road" Project)	Р-90/Р-200/Р-201	125 km
ЭМ-13	Kazarman - Ak-Tal ( М-081 М-082 ) (Road number М-080 also assigned to the same stretch of route)		128 km
ЭМ-14	Bishkek - Manas International Airport		24.5 km
ЭМ-15	Osh - Border with Uzbekistan ( A373 )	А-373	4.7 km
ЭМ-16	Osh - Kadamjay ( ЭМ-21 ) - Batken ( ЭМ-22 ) - Razzaqov (Isfana) - Kayragach ( М-100 ) - Border to Tajikistan ( РБ12 )	Р-152	394 km
ЭМ-17	ЭМ-01 - Talas - Border with Kazakhstan (Taraz)( KZ08-01 )	А-361	189 km
ЭМ-18	Kochkor ( ЭМ-11 ) - Chaek - Suusamyr - Töö Ashuu Pass ( ЭМ-04 )	А-367	212 km
ЭМ-19	Özgön ( ЭМ-04 ) - Myrza-Ake - Kara-Kulja - Kök-Art (Alaykuu)	А-370	144 km
ЭМ-20	Bishkek ( ЭМ-11 / М-001 ) - Kant - Tokmok - ЭМ-11	А-365	78.4 km
ЭМ-21	Kadamjay ( ЭМ-16 ) - Kuldu - Aydarken - So'x (Exclave of Uzbekistan)	Р-144/Р-149/Р-152	56.2 km
ЭМ-22	Batken ( ЭМ-16 ) - Bujum - Boz-Adyr - So'x (Exclave of Uzbekistan) ( 40V230 )	Р-152	35.2
ЭМ-23	Kök-Moynok-2 ( ЭМ-11 ) - Orto-Tokoy Reservoir ЭМ-11 )		25.6 km

== National Highways ==
Road	Direction	Length
М-001	ЭМ-01 - Bishkek - ЭМ-20	32.7 km
М-002	Osh City Bypass	11.7 km
М-003	Krasnaya Rechka ( ЭМ-20 ) - Ysyk-Ata Resort	44 km
М-004	Bishkek - Koy-Tash - Ysyk-Ata Resort	42.1 km
М-005	Tokmok ( ЭМ-20 , М-034 ) - Döng-Aryk - Rot-Front - Ivanovka ( ЭМ-20 )	44.4
М-006	Kegeti ( М-005 ) - East Karakol River (near Döng-Alysh) ( М-065 , М-087 )	52.6 km
М-007	Manas International Airport ( ЭМ-14 ) - Kamyshanovka ( М-020 )	31.2 km
М-008	Bishkek - Kün-Tuu - Shopokov ( ЭМ-04 ) Branch to Malovodnoye	26.6 km
М-010	Chong-Aryk ( М-013 ) - Ala-Archa Nature Park	31.5
М-011	Lugovoy ( ЭМ-01 - Dacha-Su ( М-007 )	32.0 km
М-012	Mayevka - ЭМ-02 - Ala-Archa Reservoir	11 km
М-013	Chong-Aryk ( М-010 ) - Zarechnoye - Koy-Tash ( М-004 )	20.8 km
М-014	Petrovka ( ЭМ-04 ) - Keper-Aryk ( М-019 ) - Narzan Spring (Ak-Suu)	50.8 km
М-015	Panfilov ( ЭМ-03 ) - Birinchi May	18.8 km
М-016	Kara-Balta ( ЭМ-03 ) - Stepnoye	41.4 km
М-017	Belovodskoye ( ЭМ-04 ) - Tölök	31.7 km
М-018	Belovodskoye ( ЭМ-04 ) - Sugar Factiry	2.6 km
М-019	Sosnovka ( ЭМ-04 ) - Keper-Aryk ( М-014 )	8 km
М-020	Romanovka ( ЭМ-04 ) - Kamyshanovka ( М-007 )	45.4 km
М-021	Petrovka ( ЭМ-04 ) - Oil Storage Facility (Zavodskoye)	2.2 km
М-023	Poltavka ( ЭМ-04 ) - Besh-Terek	23.7 km
М-025	Kemin ( ЭМ-11 ) - Ilyich - Ak-Tüz	33.9 km
М-026	Boroldoy ( М-025 ) - Jol-Bulak - ЭМ-11	13.1 km
М-027	ЭМ-11 - Shabdan - Kok-Oyrok	60.6 km
М-028	Kemin ( ЭМ-11 ) - Orlovka ( М-029 , М-030 )	11.5 km
М-029	Orlovka ( М-028 ) - Madaniyat - Shamshy ( М-034 )	19.6 km
М-030	Orlovka ( М-028 , М-031 ) - Jangy-Alysh ( ЭМ-11 )	8.0 km
М-031	Orlovka ( М-030 ) - Chym-Korgon ( ЭМ-20 )	13.7 km
М-032	Kant ( ЭМ-20 ) - Khun Chi ( ЭМ-11 ) - Border of Kazakhstan	12.3 km
М-033	Kant ( ЭМ-20 ) - Asphalt and Cement Factory	1.5 km
М-034	Tokmok ( ЭМ-20 ) - Shamshy ( М-029 ) - Tuyuk	43.9 km
М-035	Tokmok ( ЭМ-20 , М-005 ) - Koshoy	16.6 km
М-036	Dorozhnoye ( ЭМ-11 ) - Jel-Aryk - Cholok - ЭМ-11	13.8 km
М-037	Kyzyl-Adyr ( ЭМ-17 ) - Kanysh-Kyya ( М-108 )	147 km
М-038	Kyzyl-Adyr ( ЭМ-17 ) - Amanbaev ( М-045 ) - Maymak	28.1 km
М-039	Talas - Besh-Tash Nature Park	41 km
М-040	Talas ( ЭМ-17 ) - Kök-Oy ( М-041 ) - Nyldy - Kayyngdy ( М-046 )	33.3 km
М-041	Kök-Oy ( М-040 ) - Kyzyl-Tuu ( ЭМ-17 , М-043 )	14.4 km
М-042	Talas ( М-039 ) - Yntymak - Bakay-Ata ( М-044 )	31.6 km
М-043	Kyzyl-Tuu ( ЭМ-17 , М-041 ) - Tash-Aryk - Manas Ordo Kyrgyz national complex	3.4 km
М-044	Bakay-Ata ( М-042 ) - Kyzyl-Say ( ЭМ-17 )	6.9 km
М-045	Amanbaev ( М-038 ) - Babakhan River Valley - Tyuz Ashuu Mountain Peak	53 km
М-046	Kayyngdy ( М-040 ) - Pokrovka - ЭМ-17	30.6 km
М-047	Karakol - Ak-Suu (Teploklyuchenka) ( М-055 ) - Ak-Bulung - Sary-Jaz River ( М-050 ) - Engilchek	136 km
М-048	Barskoon ( ЭМ-10 ) - Söök ( М-049 ) - Kara-Sai - Yshtyk - Ak-Shyirak	186 km
М-049	Söök ( М-048 ) - Karakolka - Kubergenty	62 km
М-050	Karkyra ( ЭМ-08 ) - Turuk - Sary-Jaz River valley - Ottuk River ( М-047 )	95 km
М-051	ЭМ-09 - Mikhaylovka ( М-060 ) - Toguz-Bulak - Toktoyan - Sary-Tologoy ( ЭМ-08 )	82.0 km
М-052	Grigor'yevka ( ЭМ-09 ) - Grigor'yevka Pristany (Shore of Issyk-Kul)	7.0 km
М-053	Ak-Bulak - Kürmöntü ( ЭМ-09 ) - Ak-Bulun Monastery	6.5 km
М-054	Ottuk ( ЭМ-10 , М-063 ) - Semiz Bel Pass - Semiz-Bel ( ЭМ-11 )	58 km
М-055	Ak-Suu (Teploklyuchenka) ( М-047 ) - Ak-Suu Hot Springs	6.6 km
М-056	ЭМ-09 - Tepke - Kachybek - Sovetskoye ( М-057 ) - Kök-Jayyk ( ЭМ-08 )	57.5 km
М-057	Boz-Uchuk - Novovoznesenovka ( М-047 ) - Sovetskoye ( М-056 ) - Jyrgalang Coal Mine	31.0 km
М-058	Bökönbaev ( ЭМ-10 ) - Toguz-Bulak - Döng-Talaa - Kara-Talaa ( ЭМ-10 )	96 km
М-059	Bökönbaev ( ЭМ-10 ) - Kajy-Saz - Tosor River Valley - Tosor Pass - Jyluu-Suu River Valley - М-069 (Tamdy-Suu)	130 km
М-060	Karakol ( ЭМ-09 ) - Pristan'-Przheval'sk - Mikhaylovka ( М-051 )	13.2 km
М-061	Koi-Sary Military Base - Lipenka - Jeti-Ögüz ( ЭМ-09 ) - Jeti-Ögüz resort	31.0 km
М-062	Kyzyl-Suu ( ЭМ-09 ) - Pokrovka Pristany	8.0 km
М-063	ЭМ-11 - Ottuk ( ЭМ-10 , М-054 )	12.2 km
М-064	Kochkor - Kara-Too - Kum-Döbö - Kochkor ( М-065 )	41.0 km
М-065	Kochkor ( М-064 ) - Döng-Alysh - East Karakol River Pass ( М-006 , М-087 )	39.0 km
М-066	Char ( ЭМ-11 ) - Ak-Muz	13.9 km
М-067	Sary-Bulak ( ЭМ-11 ) - Tölök - Song-Köl River ( М-082 )	60.9 km
М-068	Naryn ( ЭМ-11 , М-072 ) - Döbölü - Tash-Bashat - Eki-Naryn ( М-078 ) - Örük-Tam ( М-069 )	74.5 km
М-069	Sary-Bulak ( ЭМ-11 ) - Ak-Kyya - Tamdy-Suu ( М-099 ) - Örük-Tam ( М-068 )	118 km
М-070	М-069 - Lakol - Jer-Köchkü	21.0 km
М-071	Baetov ( М-072 , М-074 ) - Terek - ЭМ-11	71 km
М-072	Naryn ( ЭМ-11 , М-068 ) - Ak-Tal ( ЭМ-13 , М-080 ) - Ügüt ( М-073 ) - Baetov ( М-071 , М-074 )	124 km
М-073	Ügüt ( М-072 ) - Kara-Bürgön ( М-074 )	35.5 km
М-074	Baetov ( М-071 , М-072 ) - Kara-Bürgön ( М-073 ) - Kosh-Döbö - Makmal	119 km
М-075	Echki-Bashy (On-Archa) ( ЭМ-11 ) - Jerge-Tal - Ak-Kuduk	70 km
М-076	At-Bashy ( М-083 ) - Ak-Muz - Torugart ( ЭМ-11 )	187 km
М-077	Aral ( ЭМ-18 ) - Sary-Bulung - Ming-Kush	35 km
М-078	Eki-Naryn ( М-068 ) - Keng-Saz	18.5 km
М-080	Kazarman - Ak-Tal ( М-081 М-082 ) (Road number ЭМ-13 also assigned to the same stretch of route)	128 km
М-081	Ak-Tal ( ЭМ-13 М-080 М-082 ) - Kara-Oy - Kadyraly	20 km
М-082	Ak-Tal (Kurtka River) ( ЭМ-13 М-080 М-081 ) - Song-Köl River ( М-067 )	73.5 km
М-083	ЭМ-11 - At-Bashy ( М-076 )	6.9 km
М-085	ЭМ-11 - Tash Rabat	15.0 km
М-086	М-076 (Near Border Outpost) - Müdürüm River Valley - Üzönggükuush River Valley - Orto-Kashka-Suu Border Outpost	162 km
М-087	Suusamyr ( ЭМ-18 ) - Karakol River Valey - East Karakol River (near Döng-Alysh) ( М-006 , М-065 )	94.5 km
М-088	Torkent ( ЭМ-04 ) - Toluk - Kyzyl-Oy ( ЭМ-18 )	149 km
М-089	Toktogul ( ЭМ-04 ) - Ak-Tektir - Besh-Tash - Kara-Künggöy	47.5 km
М-090	Osh - Aravan ( М-095 ) - Köchübaev - Border of Uzbekistan ( D087 )	33.5 km
М-091	Osh - Kashgar-Kyshtak - Kara-Suu - Savay - Border of Uzbekistan ( D102 ) Branch: Kara-Suu - Tash-Aryk ( ЭМ-04 )	32.3 km 17.7 km
М-092	Karavan ( ЭМ-16 ) - Nayman - Kerkidan - Border of Uzbekistan ( D140 )	32.3 km
М-093	Osh ( М-002 ) - Osh Airport - Kashgar-Kyshtak	12.7 km
М-094	Osh - Özgür	11 km
М-095	Nookat ( ЭМ-16 ) - Aravan ( М-090 ) - Tepe-Korgon - Border of Uzbekistan	51.5 km
М-096	Bujum - Batken ( ЭМ-16 , ЭМ-22 ) - Kyzyl-Bel - Border of Tajikistan	16.5 km
М-097	Myrza-Ake ( ЭМ-19 ) - Kara-Shoro Nature Park	68.5 km
М-098	Özgön (Jylandy) ( ЭМ-04 ) - Jiyde (Iyri-Suu) - Boz-Chichkan (Barpi) ( ЭМ-04 )	51 km
М-099	Kurshab ( ЭМ-04 ) - Kurbu-Tash - Tuz-Bel	24 km
М-100	Kayragach ( ЭМ-16 ) - Kulundu - Arka - Border to Tajikistan	36 km
М-101	Osh - Tölöykön	9 km
М-102	Ak-Terek ( ЭМ-16 ) - Papan ( М-105 ) - Kojo-Keleng; Branch:Papan - Kara-Sögöt	72 km 10 km
М-103	Otuz-Adyr ( ЭМ-04 ) - Keng-Say ( М-091 )	14 km
М-104	Ylay-Talaa ( ЭМ-19 ) - Gülchö ( ЭМ-05 )	56 km
М-105	Nookat ( ЭМ-16 ) - Papan ( М-102 )	36 km
М-106	Üch-Korgon ( ЭМ-16 ) - Daroot-Korgon ( ЭМ-06 )	115 km
М-107	Tash-Kömür ( ЭМ-04 ) - Tegene - Kerben ( М-109 )	97 km
М-108	Tash-Kömür - Kyzyl-Jar ( М-109 )	20 km
М-109	Shamaldy-Say ( ЭМ-04 ) - Kerben - Ala-Buka - Kanysh-Kyya ( М-037 )	252 km
М-110	Ala-Buka ( М-109 ) - Baymak - Border of Uzbekistan ( D107 )	12.5 km
М-111	Ak-Tam/Japa-Saldy ( М-109 ) - Ak-Korgon - Bayastan	21.5 km
М-112	Shekaftar - Ayry-Tam - Border of Uzbekistan	16 km
М-113	Yzar ( М-110 ) - Safedbulan - Border of Uzbekistan	18 km
М-114	Taran-Bazar ( ЭМ-12 ) - Kara-Alma	8.8 km
М-115	Taran-Bazar - Kalmak-Kyrchyn (To be replaced along its length by ЭМ-12 "alternative North-South highway")	17 km
М-116	Suzak ( ЭМ-04 ) - Kadu	42 km
М-117	Suzak - Changgyr-Tash ( М-121 ) - Tösh ( М-117 ) (Kara-Daryya)	22 km
М-118	Bazar-Korgon ( ЭМ-04 ) - Charbak - Arslanbob; Branch: Charbak - Kyzyl-Üngkür	45.5 km 17 km
М-119	Bürgöndü ( ЭМ-04 ) - Mayluu-Suu	23 km
М-120	Suzak Ring Road (Concurrent with ЭМ-04 )	4 km
М-121	Changgyr-Tash ( М-117 ) - Uch-Mazar (40.85604, 72.72259) - Aral - Tösh ( М-117 )	
М-122	Jalal-Abad - Bek-Abad ( ЭМ-04 ) - Border of Uzbekistan ( M41 )	13 km

== Asian Highways ==
Several of the highway of the Asian Highway Network cross Kyrgyzstan. These include the following:

- AH5
  - ЭМ-01 ЭМ-01 Road: Border of Kazakhstan - Bishkek
  - ЭМ-02 ЭМ-02 Road: Bishkek Bypass
  - ЭМ-04 ЭМ-04 Road: Bishkek - Kara-Balta
  - ЭМ-03 ЭМ-03 Road: Kara-Balta - Chaldovar - Border of Kazakhstan
- AH7
  - ЭМ-03 ЭМ-03 Road: Border of Kazakhstan - Chaldovar - Kara-Balta
  - ЭМ-04 ЭМ-04 Road: Kara-Balta - Osh
  - ЭМ-15 ЭМ-15 Road: Osh - Border of Uzbekistan
- AH61
  - ЭМ-11 ЭМ-11 Road: Border of China - Torugart Pass - Bishkek
  - ЭМ-01 ЭМ-01 Road: Bishkek - Georgievka - Border of Kazakhstan
- AH65
  - ЭМ-05 ЭМ-05 Road: Border of China - Irkeshtam - Sary-Tash
  - ЭМ-06 ЭМ-06 Road: Sary-Tash - Karamyk - Border of Tajikistan
  - (Branch) ЭМ-05 ЭМ-05 Road: Sary-Tash - Osh

== E-Roads ==
Several of the highway of the International E-road network cross Kyrgyzstan. These include the following:

- E40
  - ЭМ-03 ЭМ-03 Road: Border of Kazakhstan - Chaldovar - Kara-Balta
  - ЭМ-04 ЭМ-04 Road: Kara-Balta - Bishkek
  - ЭМ-02 ЭМ-02 Road: Bishkek Bypass
  - ЭМ-01 ЭМ-01 Road: Bishkek - Border of Kazakhstan
- E60
  - ЭМ-06 ЭМ-06 Road: Border of Tajikistan - Karamyk - Sary-Tash
  - ЭМ-05 ЭМ-05 Road: Sary-Tash - Irkeshtam - Border of China
- E125
  - ЭМ-01 ЭМ-01 Road: Border of Kazakhstan - Georgievka - Bishkek
  - ЭМ-11 ЭМ-11 Road: Bishkek - Torugart Pass - Border of China
- E007
  - ЭМ-15 ЭМ-15 Road: Border of Uzbekistan - Osh (Connects to E010)
  - ЭМ-05 ЭМ-05 Road: Osh - Taldyk Pass - Sary-Tash (Start of concurrency with E60) - Erkeshtam (at the border to China)
- E010
  - ЭМ-04 ЭМ-04 Road: Bishkek - Kara-Balta - Jalal-Abad - Osh
- E011
  - ЭМ-08 ЭМ-08 Road: Tüp - Sary-Tologoy - Border of Kazakhstan

== See also ==
- Roads in Armenia
- Roads in Azerbaijan
- Roads in Georgia (country)
- Roads in Kazakhstan
- Roads in Uzbekistan
- Roads in Tajikistan
