= Kök-Jar =

Kök-Jar may refer to the following places in Kyrgyzstan:

- Kök-Jar, Ak-Talaa, a village in Ak-Talaa District, Naryn Region
- Kök-Jar, Chüy, a village in Alamüdün District, Chüy Region
- Kök-Jar, Kochkor, a village in Kochkor District, Naryn Region
- Kök-Jar, Nookat, a village in Nookat District, Osh Region
