= Jerge-Tal =

Jerge-Tal may refer to the following places in Kyrgyzstan:

- Jerge-Tal, Jalal-Abad, a village in Aksy District, Jalal-Abad Region
- Jerge-Tal, Ak-Talaa, a village in Ak-Talaa District, Naryn Region
- Jerge-Tal, Naryn, a village in Naryn District, Naryn Region
- Jerge-Tal, Osh, a village in Alay District, Osh Region
