= Ak-Jar =

Ak-Jar may refer to the following places in Kyrgyzstan:

- Ak-Jar, At-Bashy, a village in At-Bashy District, Naryn Region
- Ak-Jar, Kochkor, a village in Kochkor District, Naryn Region
- Ak-Jar, Jalal-Abad, a village in Toktogul District, Jalal-Abad Region
- Ak-Jar, Kara-Suu, a village in Kara-Suu District, Osh Region
- Ak-Jar, Özgön, a village in Özgön District, Osh Region
- Ak-Jar, Kara-Buura, a village in Kara-Buura District, Talas Region
- Ak-Jar, Talas, a village in Talas District, Talas Region
