= Kara-Künggöy =

Kara-Künggöy may refer to the following places in Kyrgyzstan:

- Kara-Künggöy, Jalal-Abad, a village in Toktogul District, Jalal-Abad Region
- Kara-Künggöy, Naryn, a village in Kochkor District, Naryn Region
