= Kasymaly Jantöshev =

Kyrgyz novelist and playwright (1904–1968)

- Касымалы Жантөшев
- Born: 15 September 1904; Tengizbay or Tepke, Russian Turkestan, Russian Empire
- Died: 13 August 1968 (aged 63); Frunze, Kirghiz SSR, Soviet Union
- Education: Frunze Pedagogical College
- Occupations: Novelist; Playwright; Translator
- Writing career
- Period: 1926–1963
- Genres: Drama; Folklore
- Literary movement: Socialist realism

Kasymaly Jantöshev (Kyrgyz: Касымалы Жантөшев; 15 September 1904 – 13 August 1968) was a Kyrgyz writer and playwright. Jantöshev is regarded as one of the most important Kyrgyz writers, and is considered to be one of the founders of Kyrgyz drama and theatre. Many of his works portray the transformation of Kyrgyz society during the 20th-century, and contain socialist themes. One of Jantöshev's novels, Kanybek, has become part of Kyrgyzstan's cultural heritage, and remains very popular within the country.

== Early life and education ==
Jantöshev was born into a poor peasant family on 15 September 1904, in either the village of Tengizbay or Tepke, then a part of the Russian Empire. His early experiences consisted of housework and tending to sheep, and he grew up alongside herdsmen and farmers. As a child, Jantöshev's aunt recited many legends and stories, and this inspired Jantöshev's interest in artistic expression. At age 16, Jantöshev learned how to read and write, and he studied at a village school until 1924. In 1930, Jantöshev graduated from Frunze Pedagogical College in Frunze (now known as Bishkek), the capital of the Kirghiz ASSR; he later became a teacher at the college, teaching courses preparing village councilors and chairmen of collective farms.

== Early works ==
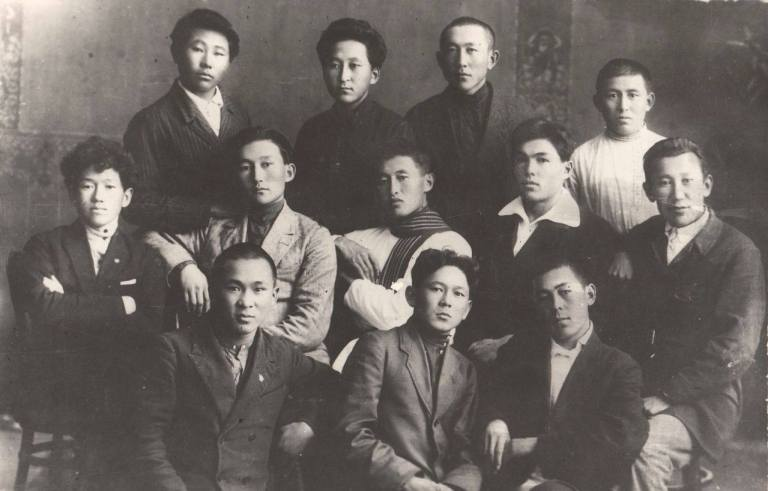
Members of the Red Spark literary circle in 1927. Jantöshev is in the middle of the second row.

In 1926, while still attending Frunze Pedagogical College, Jantöshev was admitted into the Kyrgyz Music and Drama Studio, alongside director Amankul Kuttubaev and actors Ashyraly Botaliev and Kasymaaly Eshimbekov. Later that year, Jantöshev would write his first theatrical work, a one-act play entitled Shepherds; in addition to writing the play, Jantöshev was also the lead actor. In 1927, he wrote three additional one-act plays, including one entitled Son of Lenin. Between 1928 and 1930, Jantöshev wrote three multi-act plays: Karachach and Alym and Maria, both dramas of the lives of Kyrgyz women before the Russian Revolution, as well as Let the Rich Lose. All three of these plays were staged in public theaters, with the latter being staged at the Kyrgyz State Drama Theater.

In 1931, Jantöshev had joined the People's Commissariat for Education of the Kirghiz ASSR as a methodologist, and spent part of the 1930s in the remote mountains of southern Kyrgyzstan, where he studied the history of the Kyrgyz people. The latter experience reinvigorated Jantöshev's attachment to writing, and in 1934, he joined the Union of Soviet Writers and became the director of the Kyrgyz State Drama Theater, a role he would hold until 1946. In 1937, Jantöshev wrote Dardash, a play about the collectivization of the Kyrgyz economy. In this period, Jantöshev also became interested in prose, writing several short stories and essays.

== Main works ==
In 1938, Jantöshev wrote his first novel, Two Young People. The novel was heavily rooted in socialist themes, in particular collectivization and class struggle. While the novel did not examine the inner thoughts of its characters, it exemplified the socialist transition that had been occurring in Kyrgyzstan throughout the 1930s, by reflecting the conflict and transition from the old way of doing things to the new ways, through the lens of story about marriage. Two Young People was very popular among the Kyrgyz youth, and became a model for young love.

Over a 19-year span between 1939 and 1958, Jantöshev worked on his main novel, Kanybek. The novel was written in four volumes, released in 1939, 1941, 1948, and 1958. Kanybek, a historical and adventure novel, is considered one of the most popular works of Kyrgyz literature. The first book follows the titular Kanybek as he experiences slavery and feudalism, briefly obtains his personal liberty, is exiled to Siberia, and ultimately leads a class war that radically changes the social order and establishes Soviet rule.

Later, in 1954, Jantöshev wrote Kanybek as a play, and it was staged many times. In 1979, 11 years after Jantöshev's death, the film studio Kyrgyzfilm adapted part of the novel to film. At a 2014 event commemorating the 110th anniversary of Jantöshev's birth, Asylbek Jêênbekov, the Speaker of the Supreme Council of Kyrgyzstan, stated that "there is not a single person [in Kyrgyzstan] who does not know the novel Kanybek", and that "the novel passes from generation to generation as an artistic heritage, and this book is in the library of every Kyrgyz family".

== Later works ==
For much of his career, Jantöshev was politically involved. Many of his works were about collectivization and class struggle, and in 1943, he joined the Communist Party of the Soviet Union. Between 1942 and 1948, Jantöshev wrote several plays including one dedicated to the heroism of Soviet revolutionaries, and another dedicated to the Kyrgyz singer Toktogul Satylganov. During World War II, Jantöshev wrote several plays, most notably Kim Kantti, a comedy focusing on collective farmers during the war, and through his writings, he encouraged Soviet patriotism and urged readers to resist the Axis forces. For his efforts during the war, Jantöshev was awarded the Medal "For Valiant Labour in the Great Patriotic War 1941–1945".

In 1946, Jantöshev wrote a play entitled In One House to celebrate peace and support the reconstruction of the Soviet Union; the play has been described as a "realistic fairytale for adults". During the late 1940s and early 1950s, Jantöshev wrote several short stories and children's books. Jantöshev also translated several foreign works into Kyrgyz, most prominently How the Steel Was Tempered by Nikolai Ostrovsky, as well as works by Mikhail Lermontov and Hans Christian Andersen. In 1948, Jantöshev became the editor of the Kyrgyz State Publishing House, holding the position until the following year when he became the head of the art department of the People's Commissariat of the Kirghiz SSR. He held that position until 1951.

In 1955, Jantöshev wrote a satirical comedy entitled The Lasso for the Shrew. Its appearance was one of the first indications that stylistic and production restrictions were beginning to relax after the death of Joseph Stalin in 1953. In the late 1950s, Jantöshev and other Kyrgyz writers often drew on folklore for themes. Jantöshev's Kurmanbeck about the folk hero Batyr was highly popular. In 1957, he wrote the poem Mendirman, which was based on Kyrgyz folk art.

In 1958, amongst discontent over the Kirghiz SSR's moderate stance towards religion, Jantöshev wrote to Iskak Razzakov, the first secretary of the Communist Party of Kirghizia, and Kazy Dikambayev, the leader of the Kirghiz SSR. Jantöshev, who was friends with both officials, urged them to take a more hardline stance against religion. Jantöshev stated that he was most outraged against officials who had gained power through the communist system, only to "engage in prayers and blab on about the sharia, Quran in hand".

In 1960, Jantöshev was a screenwriter for the film Tien-Shan Girl, and in 1963, Jantöshev published his third novel, The Shepherd from Khan Tengri. This novel is set around the time it was written, and focuses on the changes in Kyrgyz society. The State Archival Service of the Kyrgyz Republic describes this novel as a "special step in the development of the Kyrgyz language and culture".

During the 1960s, Jantöshev's writing style is described as having changed; instead of focusing on the ideals of characters and details of events as he previously had, Jantöshev instead focused on the inner psychology of his characters. Some of his works in this period are Is It My Fault? and My Fate.

From 1964 until 1968, Jantöshev was the editor-in-chief of the Ministry of Culture of the Kirghiz SSR. Later in 1968, Jantöshev was awarded the title of People's Writer of the Kirghiz SSR.

== Death and legacy ==
Jantöshev died in Frunze on 13 August 1968 at the age of 63.

Jantöshev is regarded as the founder of Kyrgyz drama, and remains a popular cultural figure in the country. In 2014, an event commemorating his 110th birthday was held, hosted by the National Library of the Kyrgyz Republic; at the event, universities and other schools held an exhibition presenting Jantöshev's literature and articles about him, while actors performed excerpts from his works.

Several schools, libraries, a street in Bishkek, and the Issyk-Kul Regional Drama Theater are named after Jantöshev.

== Decorations and awards ==
Jantöshev received the following decorations and awards:

- Order of the Badge of Honor (twice)
- Medal "For Valiant Labour in the Great Patriotic War 1941–1945"
- Medal "For Distinguished Labour"
- People's Writer of the Kirghiz SSR
- Honored Artist of the Kirghiz SSR
