= Emilbek Abakirov =

Soviet-Kyrgyz politician (1929–2022)

Member of the Congress of People's Deputies of the Soviet Union
- In office 1989–1991

Personal details
- Born: 18 March 1929 Ortok, Kirghiz ASSR, Russian SFSR, Soviet Union
- Died: 22 January 2022 (aged 92)
- Party: CPSU

Emilbek Abakirov (Kyrgyz: Абакиров Эмилбек; 18 March 1929 – 22 January 2022) was a Soviet-Kyrgyz politician and trade unionist.

Abakirov was the First Secretary of the Osh City Committee of the Communist Party of Kirghizia between 1970 and 1973. In 1971 he became a member of the Central Committee of Kirghizia, and in 1976 he was inducted into the Bureau of the Central Committee. In 1973 he became the chairman of the Kirghiz SSR Trade Union Council. In 1975 he was elected to the Supreme Soviet of the Kirghiz SSR.

He served in the Congress of People's Deputies of the Soviet Union from 1989 to 1991. He died on 22 January 2022, at the age of 92.
