= Kasan-Sai Reservoir =

Reservoir in Kyrgyzstan

- Location within Kyrgyzstan
- Location: Ala-Buka District, Jalal-Abad Region, Kyrgyzstan
- Coordinates: 41°36′31″N 71°43′31″E
- Primary inflows: Kasan-Sai River
- Primary outflows: Kasan-Sai River
- Built: 1941–1948
- First flooded: 1948
- Surface area: 8 km^{2} (3.1 sq mi)
- Average depth: 20.6 m (68 ft)
- Water volume: 165×10^{6} m^{3} (134,000 acre⋅ft)

The Kasan-Sai Reservoir or Kasan-Say Reservoir (Kyrgyz: Касан-Сай суу сактагычы; Uzbek: Kosonsoy suv ombori), formerly called the Orto-Tokoi Reservoir or Orto-Tokoy Reservoir, is a reservoir in Ala-Buka District of Jalal-Abad Region of Kyrgyzstan near the border with Uzbekistan. The reservoir has a maximum surface area of 8 square kilometres (3.1 sq mi), and an estimated volume of 0.165 cubic kilometres (0.040 cu mi), of which 0.155 cubic kilometres (0.037 cu mi) is available for irrigation.

The reservoir was built from 1941 to 1948 on Kyrgyz SSR territory with funding from the Uzbek SSR on the Kasai-Sai River. Since its completion, the reservoir has been primarily used by Uzbekistan. Following the dissolution of the USSR, the two countries disputed ownership of the reservoir. On several occasions, Kyrgyzstan accused Uzbekistan of deploying troops to the area near the reservoir.

In October 2017, Kyrgyzstan and Uzbekistan reached an agreement on the joint use of the Kasan-Sai Reservoir. According to the agreement, Kyrgyzstan is now the undisputed owner, but the two counties will jointly use it, with maintenance costs shared between the two according to water usage: Uzbekistan will use 90 percent of the reservoir's water and thus cover most of the maintenance costs.

== See also ==
- Orto-Tokoy Reservoir
