= Karasaz =

Karasaz may refer to:

- Kara-Saz, Naryn Region, Kyrgyzstan
- Karasaz, Elâzığ, Elazığ Province, Turkey
- Karasaz, Almaty Region, Kazakhstan
- Karasaz, Zhambyl Region, Kazakhstan
