= Kayyngdy-Bulak =

Kayyngdy-Bulak Кайыңды-Булак
- Location within Kyrgyzstan
- Coordinates: 41°17′25″N 74°56′56″E
- Country: Kyrgyzstan
- Region: Naryn
- District: Ak-Talaa

Population (2021)
  - Total: 1,211

Kayyngdy-Bulak (Kyrgyz: Кайыңды-Булак) is a village in Ak-Talaa District of Naryn Region of Kyrgyzstan. Its population was 1211 in 2021. The road of national significance М-072 (as per the national road classification) passes near the village.
