= Jangy-Tilek =

Jangy-Tilek Жаңы-Тилек
- Location within Kyrgyzstan
- Coordinates: 41°15′54″N 74°51′18″E
- Country: Kyrgyzstan
- Region: Naryn
- District: Ak-Talaa

Population (2021)
  - Total: 625

Jangy-Tilek (Kyrgyz: Жаңы-Тилек) is a village in Ak-Talaa District of Naryn Region of Kyrgyzstan. Its population was 625 in 2021.
