= Tengdik =

Tengdik Теңдик
- Location within Kyrgyzstan
- Coordinates: 42°12′30″N 75°43′40″E
- Country: Kyrgyzstan
- Region: Naryn
- District: Kochkor

Population (2021)
  - Total: 5,052
- Time zone: UTC+6

Tengdik (Kyrgyz: Теңдик) is a village in Naryn Region of Kyrgyzstan. It is part of the Kochkor District and the Kochkor rural community (ayyl aymagy). Its population was 5,052 in 2021.

== Population ==
Historical population
Year	Pop.	±% p.a.
2009	4,087	—
2021	5,052	+1.78%
Note: resident population; Sources:
