= Shamshy =

Shamshy Шамшы
- Location within Kyrgyzstan
- Coordinates: 42°18′36″N 75°25′48″E
- Country: Kyrgyzstan
- Region: Naryn Region
- District: Kochkor District
- Elevation: 2,250 m (7,380 ft)

Population (2021)
  - Total: 2,675
- Time zone: UTC+6

Shamshy is a village in Naryn Region of Kyrgyzstan. It is part of the Kochkor District. Its population was 2,675 in 2021.
