= Kara-Suu, Kochkor =

Kara-Suu Кара-Суу
- Location within Kyrgyzstan
- Coordinates: 42°11′24″N 75°48′36″E
- Country: Kyrgyzstan
- Region: Naryn Region
- District: Kochkor District
- Elevation: 1,857 m (6,093 ft)

Population (2021)
  - Total: 3,445
- Time zone: UTC+6

Kara-Suu is a village in Naryn Region of Kyrgyzstan. It is part of the Kochkor District. Its population was 3,445 in 2021.
