= Otuz-Uul =

Otuz-Uul Отуз-Уул
- Location within Kyrgyzstan
- Coordinates: 42°33′00″N 78°28′48″E
- Country: Kyrgyzstan
- Region: Issyk-Kul
- District: Ak-Suu
- Elevation: 1,686 m (5,531 ft)

Population (2023)
  - Total: 1,375
- Time zone: UTC+6

Otuz-Uul is a village in the Issyk-Kul Region of Kyrgyzstan. Its population was 1,334 in 2021. It is part of the Oktyabr rural community (ayyl aymagy) of the Ak-Suu District.
