= Cholok-Kayyng =

Village in Naryn Region, Kyrgyzstan

Cholok-Kayyng Чолок-Кайың
- Village
- Location within Kyrgyzstan
- Coordinates: 41°14′05″N 74°32′18″E
- Country: Kyrgyzstan
- Region: Naryn
- District: Ak-Talaa

Population (2021)
  - Total: 2,412

Cholok-Kayyng (Kyrgyz: Чолок-Кайың), formerly known as Osoaviakhim (Russian: Осоавиахим), is a village in Ak-Talaa District, Naryn Region, Kyrgyzstan. Its population was 2,412 in 2021.

== History ==
The village was renamed from Osoaviakhim to Cholok-Kayyng under Article 1 of Law No. 19 of the Kyrgyz Republic, dated 31 January 2002.
