= Ara-Köl =

Ara-Köl Ара-Көл
- Location within Kyrgyzstan
- Coordinates: 42°10′14″N 75°27′54″E
- Country: Kyrgyzstan
- Region: Naryn Region
- District: Kochkor District
- Elevation: 2,005 m (6,578 ft)

Population (2021)
  - Total: 1,028
- Time zone: UTC+6

Ara-Köl (or Ara-Kel, Arakol) is a village in Cholpon rural community of Kochkor District of Naryn Region of Kyrgyzstan. Its population was 1,028 in 2021.
