= Örüktü =

Örüktü Өрүктү
- Location within Kyrgyzstan
- Coordinates: 41°25′40″N 71°25′20″E
- Country: Kyrgyzstan
- Region: Jalal-Abad Region
- District: Ala-Buka District

Population (2021)
  - Total: 3,831
- Time zone: UTC+6

Örüktü is a village in Jalal-Abad Region of Kyrgyzstan. It is part of the Ala-Buka District. Its population was 3,831 in 2021.
