= Kurbu =

- Location within Kyrgyzstan
- Coordinates: 42°37′48″N 78°25′48″E
- Country: Kyrgyzstan
- Region: Issyk-Kul Region
- District: Ak-Suu District
- Elevation: 1,645 m (5,397 ft)

Population (2023)
  - Total: 1,046
- Time zone: UTC+6

Kurbu is a village in the Issyk-Kul Region of Kyrgyzstan. It is part of Ak-Suu District. Its population was 1,060 in 2021.
