= Mantysh =

Mantysh Мантыш
- Location within Kyrgyzstan
- Coordinates: 42°12′7″N 75°14′41″E
- Country: Kyrgyzstan
- Region: Naryn Region
- District: Kochkor District
- Elevation: 2,215 m (7,267 ft)

Population (2021)
  - Total: 1,393
- Time zone: UTC+6

Mantysh (Kyrgyz: Мантыш) is a village in the Kochkor District of Naryn Region of Kyrgyzstan. It is the center of Kara-Suu rural community. Its population was 1,393 in 2021.
