= Orto-Syrt =

Orto-Syrt Орто-Сырт
- Location within Kyrgyzstan
- Coordinates: 41°08′31″N 75°02′05″E
- Country: Kyrgyzstan
- Region: Naryn
- District: Ak-Talaa

Population (2021)
  - Total: 12

Orto-Syrt (Kyrgyz: Орто-Сырт) is a small village in Ak-Talaa District of Naryn Region of Kyrgyzstan. Its population was 12 in 2021.
