= Cholpon, Issyk-Kul =

Cholpon
- Location within Kyrgyzstan
- Coordinates: 42°37′48″N 78°28′48″E
- Country: Kyrgyzstan
- Region: Issyk-Kul Region
- District: Ak-Suu District
- Elevation: 1,682 m (5,518 ft)

Population (2023)
  - Total: 1,730
- Time zone: UTC+6

Cholpon is a village in the Ak-Suu District of Issyk-Kul Region of Kyrgyzstan. Its population was 1,687 in 2021.
