= Jol-Kolot =

Village in Issyk-Kul Region, Kyrgyzstan

Jol-Kolot Kyrgyz: Жол-Колот
- Village
- Location within Kyrgyzstan
- Coordinates: 42°28′43″N 78°25′39″E
- Country: Kyrgyzstan
- Region: Issyk-Kul Region
- District: Ak-Suu District
- Rural community: Altyn-Arashan

Population (2025)
  - Total: 3,018
- Time zone: UTC+6

Jol-Kolot (Kyrgyz: Жол-Колот; Russian: Джол-Колот), also known as Jolgolot, is a village in Ak-Suu District, Issyk-Kul Region, Kyrgyzstan, and forms part of the Altyn-Arashan rural community.

According to the local government's demographic profile, the village had a population of 3,018 in 2025, comprising 606 households.
