= Ak-Suu District =

Ak-Suu Kyrgyz: Ак-Суу району Russian: Ак-Суйский район English: White Water District
- District
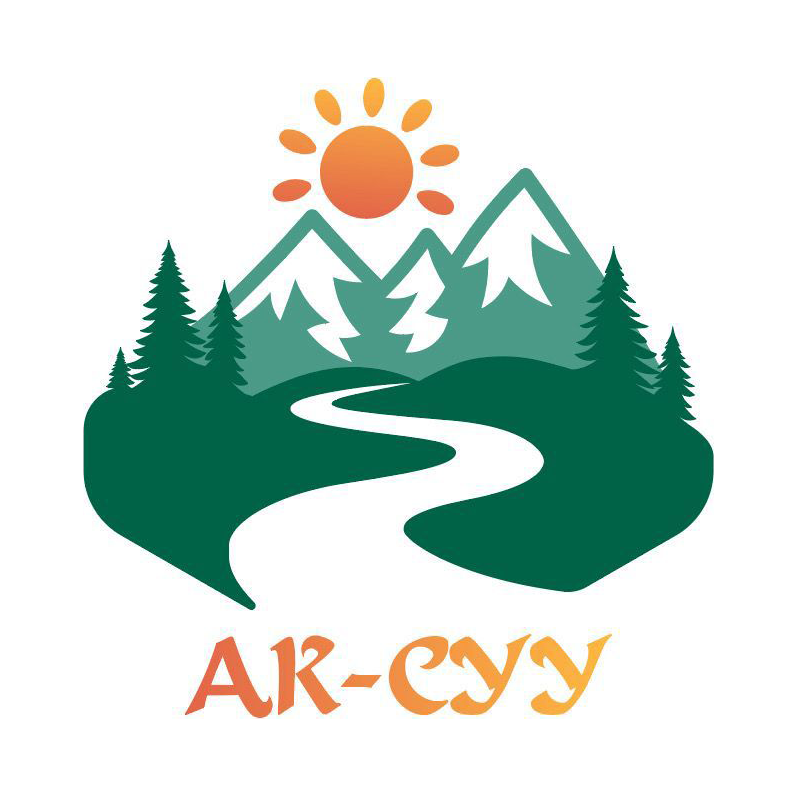
- Coat of arms

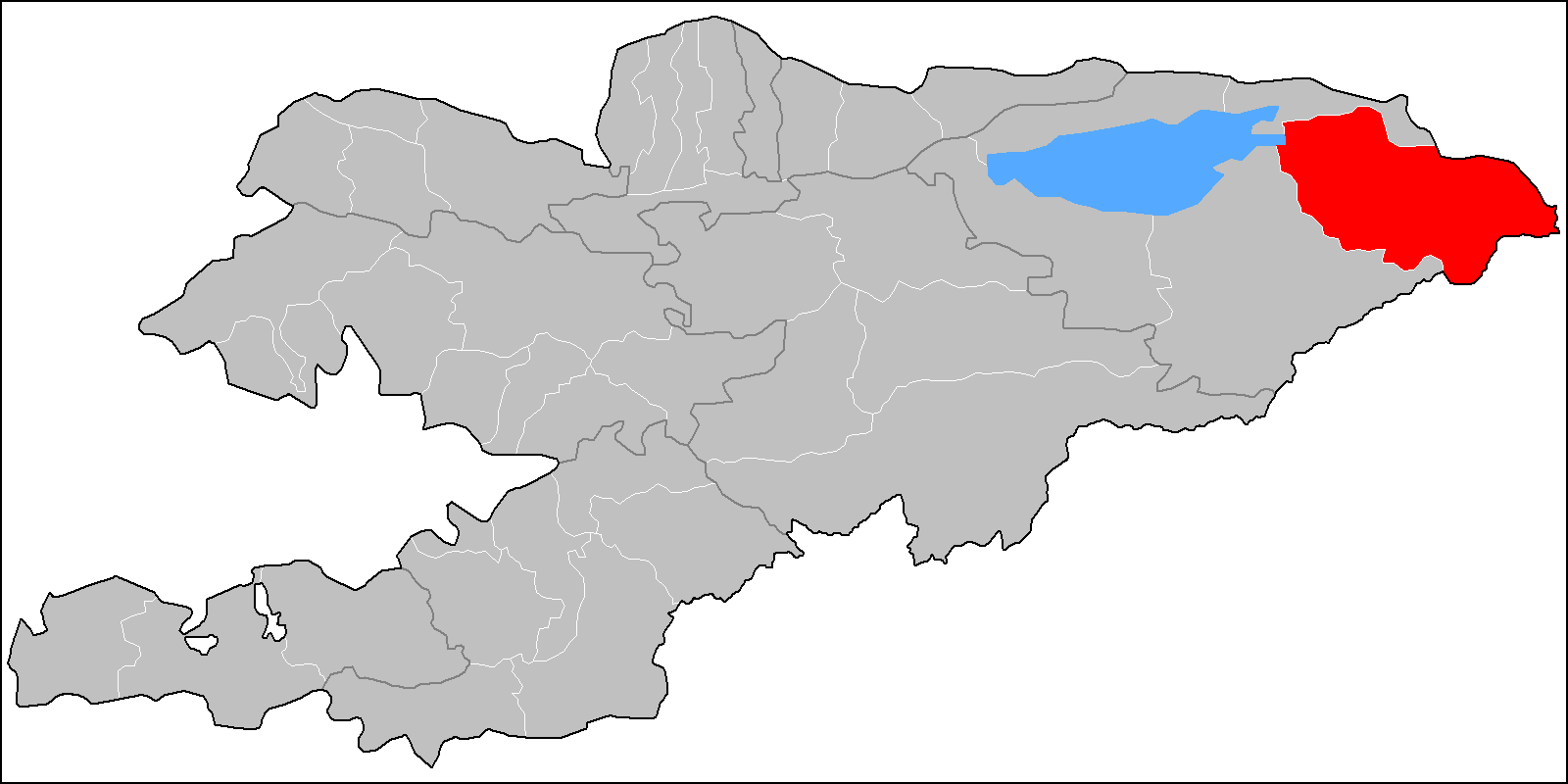
- Coordinates: 42°30′N 78°40′E
- Country: Kyrgyzstan
- Region: Issyk-Kul

Area
  - Total: 9,917 km^{2} (3,829 sq mi)

Population (2023)
  - Total: 73,967
  - Density: 7.459/km^{2} (19.32/sq mi)
- Time zone: UTC+6 (KGT)

Ak-Suu (Kyrgyz: Ак-Суу району) is a district of Issyk-Kul Region in eastern Kyrgyzstan. The administrative center lies at the village Teploklyuchenka. Its area is 9,917 square kilometres (3,829 sq mi), and its resident population was 69,439 in 2021.

== Geography ==
Located in Kyrgyzstan's eastern corner, the district borders in the north with the Almaty Region of Kazakhstan, and in the east, with the Aksu Prefecture of China's Xinjiang Uyghur Autonomous Region. Two of Kyrgyzstan's highest mountains, Jengish Chokusu (Victory Peak, or Pobeda Peak in Russian) and Khan Tengri, are located on these borders. Some 93% of the district is occupied by mountains and 7% - by valleys

== Climate ==
The average temperature in January is −8 °C in valleys and −26 °C - in mountains. In July, the average monthly temperature varies from +14 °C in valleys and 9 °C - in mountains. The minimum temperature drops to 40 °C below zero. The average high temperatures are from +30 °C in valleys and +15 °C - in mountains. The total precipitation is from 300 to 400 mm in valleys and from 500 to 600 mm - in mountains. The snow accumulation reaches 40 cm in valleys. The maximum expected wind speed (once in 20-year period) is 34 m/s.

== Tourism ==
The Ak-Suu district is an important hub for Kyrgyzstan's adventure tourism industry centred on Karakol, most notably trekking to lake Ala-Köl and the newly-established Ak-Suu Traverse, a multi-day trek which typically takes between seven and nine days to complete.

== Demographics ==
The district population, as of 2021, was 69,439. The population density was 7.0 people per square kilometer.

Historical populations in Ak-Suu District
Year	Pop.	±% p.a.
1970	44,361	—
1979	50,422	+1.43%
1989	56,889	+1.21%
1999	57,155	+0.05%
2009	63,686	+1.09%
2021	69,439	+0.72%
Note: resident population; Source:

=== Ethnic composition ===
According to the 2009 Census, the ethnic composition (de jure population) of the Ak-Suu District was:

Ethnic group	Population	Proportion of Ak-Suu District population
Kyrgyzs	56,369	88.5%
Russians	2,884	4.5%
Kalmyks	2,805	4.4%
Kazakhs	916	1.5%
Uygurs	201	0.3%
Tatars	146	0.2%
Ukrainians	125	0.2%
Uzbeks	110	0.2%
Other groups	130	0.2%

== Populated places ==
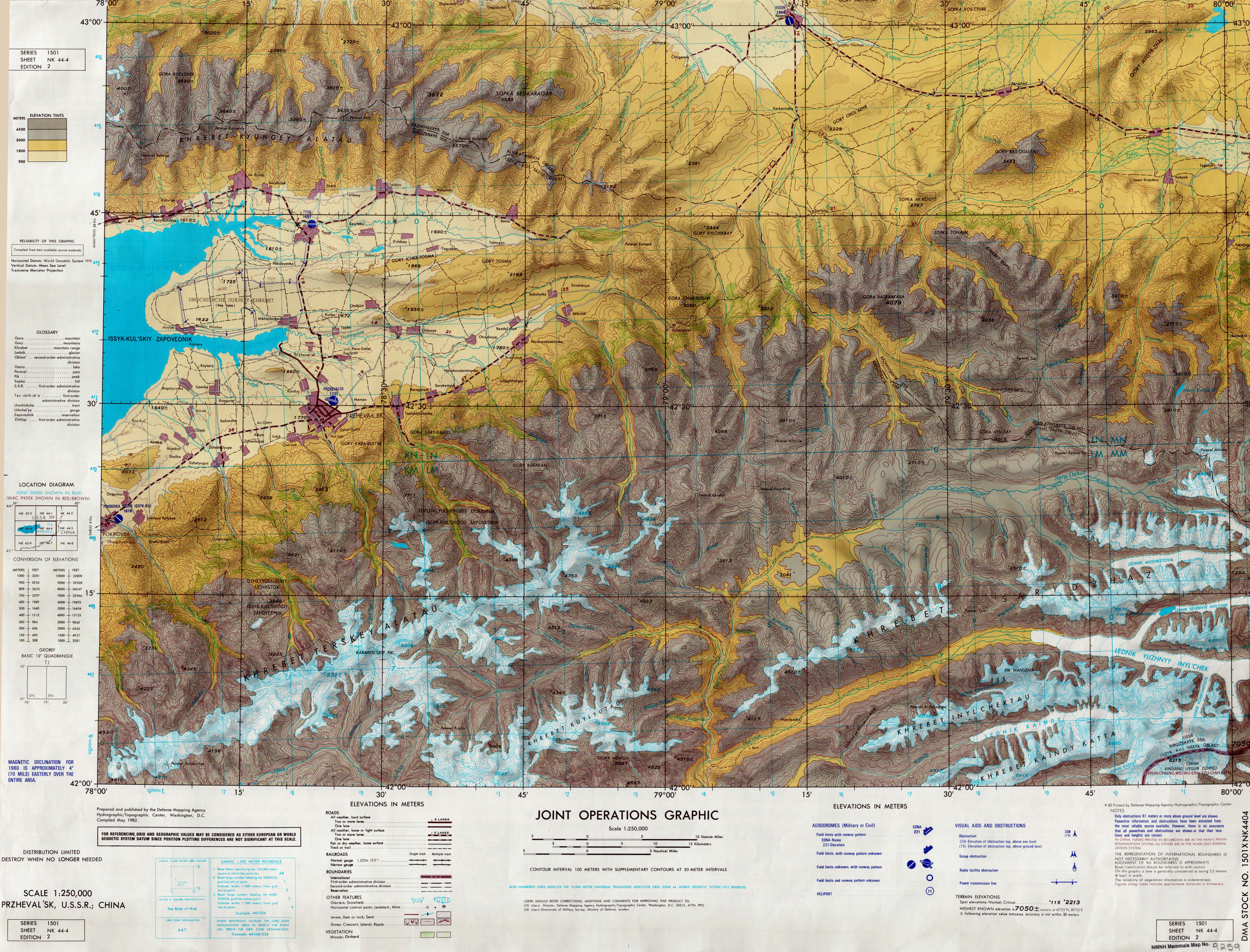

In total, Ak-Suu District includes 48 settlements in 14 rural communities (ayyl aymagy). Each rural community can consist of one or several villages. The rural communities and settlements in the Ak-Suu District are:

1. Ak-Bulung (seat: Ak-Bulung; incl. Ak-Bulak, Toktogul and Türgön)
2. Ak-Chiy (seat: Ak-Chiy; incl. Kachybek, Kök-Jayyk, Kyzyl-Jar and Sovetskoye)
3. Börü-Bash (seat: Börü-Bash; incl. Cherik)
4. Boz-Uchuk (seat: Novovoznesenovka; incl. Boz-Uchuk and Ichke-Jergez)
5. Chelpek (seat: Chelpek; incl. Burma-Suu and Tash-Kyya)
6. Engilchek (seat: Engilchek, incl. Keng-Suu, Koyluu, Kurgak, May-Saz, Tash-Koroo and Echkili-Tash)
7. Jyrgalang (seat: Jyrgalang)
8. Kara-Jal (seat: Tegizchil; incl. Jangy-Aryk, Kara-Jal and Boz-Bulung)
9. Karakol (seat: Karakol; incl. Cholpon)
10. Kerege-Tash (seat: Sary-Kamysh; incl. Kerege-Tash, Kayyrma-Aryk, Novokonstantinovka and Pioner)
11. Oktyabr (seat: Oktyabrskoye; incl. Jol-Kolot, Otuz-Uul and Üch-Kaynar)
12. Otradnoye (seat: Otradnoye; incl. Orlinoye and Shapak)
13. Tepke (seat: Tepke; incl. Jyldyz and Kurbu)
14. Teploklyuchenka (seat: Teploklyuchenka; incl. Lesnoye)
Settlements of the Ak-Suu District
