= Ala-Buka =

Ala-Buka Ала-Бука
- Location within Kyrgyzstan
- Coordinates: 41°24′30″N 71°28′50″E
- Country: Kyrgyzstan
- Region: Jalal-Abad Region
- District: Ala-Buka District
- Elevation: 1,156 m (3,793 ft)

Population (2021)
  - Total: 15,426
- Time zone: UTC+6

Ala-Buka a village which is the seat of Ala-Buka District of Jalal-Abad Region, Kyrgyzstan. Its population was 15,426 in 2021.

It is about 25 km southwest of Kerben on the main highway. The Kasansay reservoir is located to the southwest. 14 km to the east is the 12th-century mausoleum of Safed-Bulan and Shakh Fazil, a place of pilgrimage. Shakh Fazil is reputed to have first brought Islam to the area. Safed Bulan was a pious woman who is said to have buried the heads of Muslim soldiers who were beheaded after a battle.

== Population ==
Historical population
Year	Pop.	±% p.a.
2009	10,813	—
2021	15,426	+3.01%
Note: resident population; Sources:
