= Ak-Kyya, Ak-Talaa =

Ak-Kyya Ак-Кыя
- Location within Kyrgyzstan
- Coordinates: 41°26′55″N 74°50′43″E
- Country: Kyrgyzstan
- Region: Naryn
- District: Ak-Talaa

Population (2021)
  - Total: 1,094

Ak-Kyya (Kyrgyz: Ак-Кыя) is a village in Ak-Talaa District of Naryn Region of Kyrgyzstan. Its population was 1094 in 2021.
