= Ichke-Jergez =

Ichke-Jergez Ичке-Жергез
- village
- Location within Kyrgyzstan
- Coordinates: 42°32′30″N 78°42′39″E
- Country: Kyrgyzstan
- Region: Issyk-Kul Region
- District: Ak-Suu District
- Elevation: 1,845 m (6,053 ft)

Population (2023)
  - Total: 2,303
- Time zone: UTC+6

Ichke-Jergez is a village in the Ak-Suu District of Issyk-Kul Region of Kyrgyzstan. Its population was 2,276 in 2021.
