= Jangy-Talap, Ak-Talaa =

Jangy-Talap Жаңы-Талап
- Location within Kyrgyzstan
- Coordinates: 41°27′25″N 75°00′59″E
- Country: Kyrgyzstan
- Region: Naryn
- District: Ak-Talaa

Population (2021)
  - Total: 2,515

Jangy-Talap (Kyrgyz: Жаңы-Талап) is a village in Ak-Talaa District of Naryn Region of Kyrgyzstan. Its population was 2515 in 2021.
