= Buguchu =

Buguchu Бугучу
- Location within Kyrgyzstan
- Coordinates: 42°12′46″N 75°31′27″E
- Country: Kyrgyzstan
- Region: Naryn Region
- District: Kochkor District
- Elevation: 1,915 m (6,283 ft)

Population (2021)
  - Total: 1,097
- Time zone: UTC+6

Buguchu is a village in Kochkor District of Naryn Region of Kyrgyzstan. Its population was 1,097 in 2021.
