= Üch-Kaynar =

Village in Issyk-Kul Region, Kyrgyzstan

Üch-Kaynar Kyrgyz: Үч-Кайнар
- Village
- Location within Kyrgyzstan
- Coordinates: 42°32′14″N 78°27′46″E
- Country: Kyrgyzstan
- Region: Issyk-Kul Region
- District: Ak-Suu District
- Rural community: Altyn-Arashan

Population (2025)
  - Total: 1,124
- Time zone: UTC+6

Üch-Kaynar (Kyrgyz: Үч-Кайнар; Russian: Уч-Кайнар) is a village in Ak-Suu District, Issyk-Kul Region, Kyrgyzstan, and forms part of the Altyn-Arashan rural community. According to the local government's demographic profile, it had a population of 1,124 in 2025.
