= Ak-Talaa =

Ak-Talaa Ак-Талаа
- Location within Kyrgyzstan
- Coordinates: 42°10′50″N 75°19′30″E
- Country: Kyrgyzstan
- Region: Naryn Region
- District: Kochkor District

Population (2021)
  - Total: 832
- Time zone: UTC+6

Ak-Talaa is a village in Naryn Region of Kyrgyzstan. Its population was 832 in 2021.
