= Epkin =

Epkin Эпкин
- Location within Kyrgyzstan
- Coordinates: 42°9′36″N 75°24′36″E
- Country: Kyrgyzstan
- Region: Naryn Region
- District: Kochkor District
- Elevation: 2,045 m (6,709 ft)

Population (2021)
  - Total: 1,663
- Time zone: UTC+6

Epkin is a village in Naryn Region of Kyrgyzstan. It is part of the Kochkor District. Its population was 1,663 in 2021.
