= Kyzyl-Döbö =

Kyzyl-Döbö Кызыл-Дөбө
- Location within Kyrgyzstan
- Coordinates: 42°12′0″N 75°15′36″E
- Country: Kyrgyzstan
- Region: Naryn Region
- District: Kochkor District
- Elevation: 2,154 m (7,067 ft)

Population (2021)
  - Total: 2,239
- Time zone: UTC+6

Kyzyl-Döbö (Kyrgyz: Кызыл-Дөбө [qɯzɯldøβø]) is a village in Kochkor District of Naryn Region in Kyrgyzstan. Its population was 2,239 in 2021.
