= Kyzyl-Ata =

Kyzyl-Ata Кызыл-Ата
- Location within Kyrgyzstan
- Coordinates: 41°25′50″N 71°32′10″E
- Country: Kyrgyzstan
- Region: Jalal-Abad Region
- District: Ala-Buka District
- Elevation: 1,271 m (4,170 ft)

Population (2021)
  - Total: 2,794
- Time zone: UTC+6

Kyzyl-Ata is a village in Ala-Buka District of Jalal-Abad Region of Kyrgyzstan. Its population was 2,794 in 2021.
