= Baygönchok =

Baygönchok Байгөнчөк
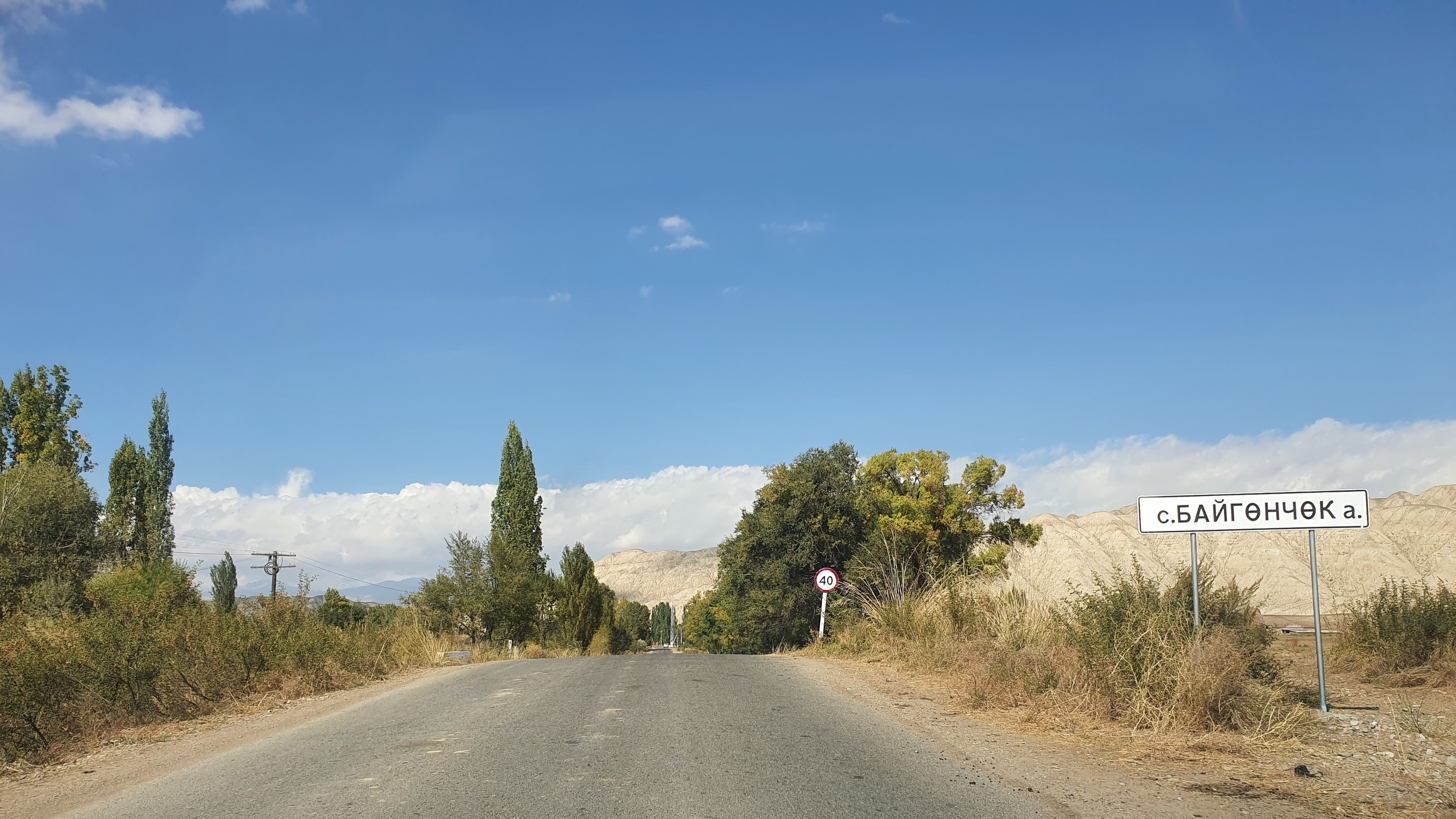
- Baygönchok village

- Location within Kyrgyzstan
- Coordinates: 41°21′26″N 74°55′35″E
- Country: Kyrgyzstan
- Region: Naryn
- District: Ak-Talaa

Population (2021)
  - Total: 745

Baygönchok (Kyrgyz: Байгөнчөк) is a village in Ak-Talaa District of Naryn Region of Kyrgyzstan. Its population was 745 in 2021.
