= Cholpon, Naryn =

Cholpon
- Location within Kyrgyzstan
- Coordinates: 42°11′45.6″N 75°28′30″E
- Country: Kyrgyzstan
- Region: Naryn Region
- District: Kochkor District
- Elevation: 1,931 m (6,335 ft)

Population (2021)
  - Total: 3,020
- Time zone: UTC+6

Cholpon is a village and the administrative centre of Cholpon rural community in Kochkor District of Naryn Region of Kyrgyzstan. Its population was 3,020 in 2021.

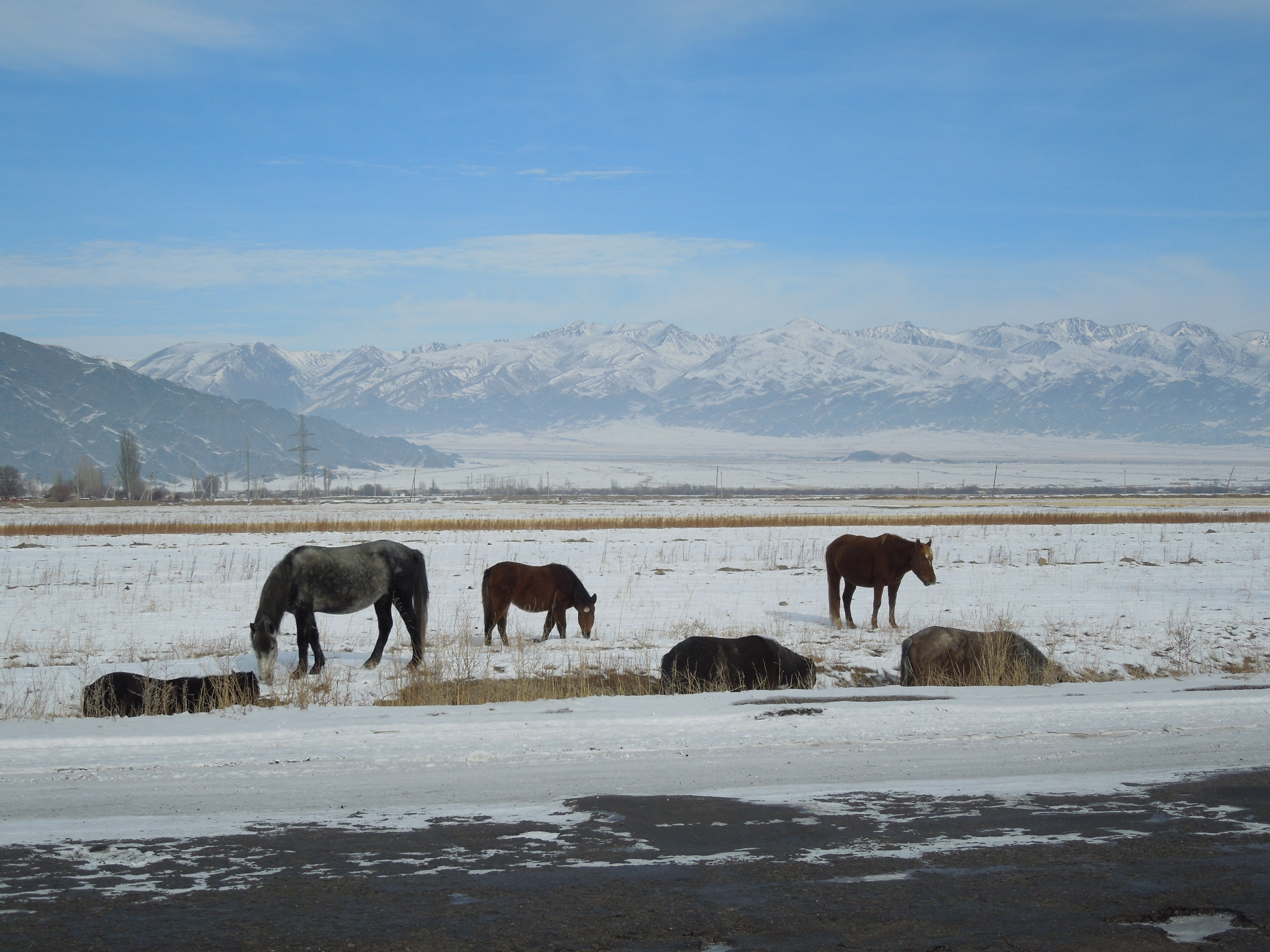
Horses on winter pasture near Cholpon (2013)
