= Ak-Chiy, Ak-Talaa =

Ak-Chiy Ак-Чий
- Location within Kyrgyzstan
- Coordinates: 41°13′25″N 74°50′31″E
- Country: Kyrgyzstan
- Region: Naryn
- District: Ak-Talaa

Population (2021)
  - Total: 668

Ak-Chiy (Kyrgyz: Ак-Чий) is a village in Ak-Talaa District of Naryn Region of Kyrgyzstan. Its population was 668 in 2021.
