= Orto-Tokoy Reservoir =

Reservoir in Kyrgyzstan

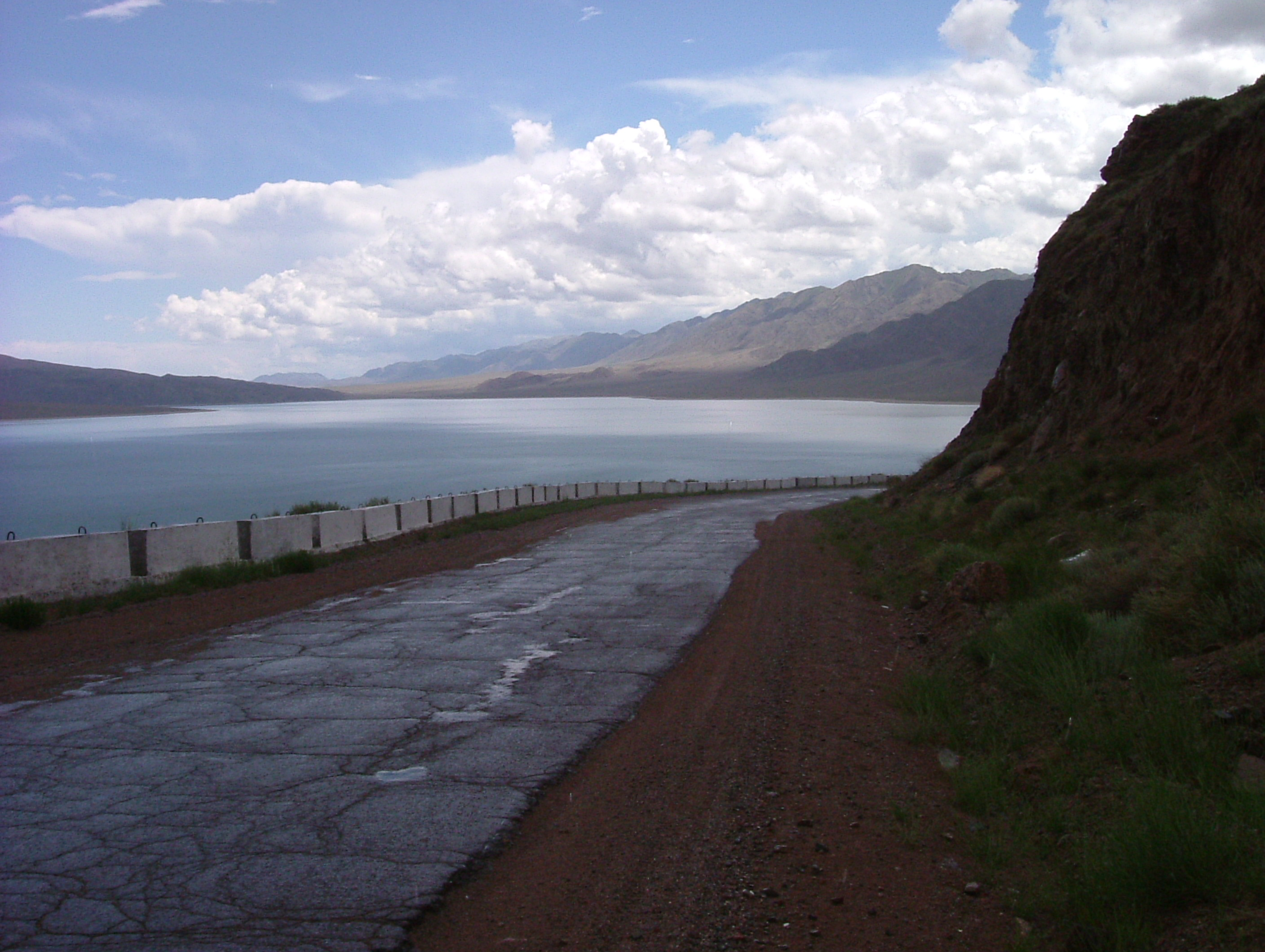

- Location within Kyrgyzstan
- Location: Kochkor District, Naryn Region, Kyrgyzstan
- Coordinates: 42°18′20″N 75°57′20″E
- Primary inflows: Chu River
- Primary outflows: Chu River
- Built: May 1, 1957
- Surface area: 24 km^{2} (9.3 sq mi)
- Average depth: 46 m (151 ft)
- Water volume: 470×10^{6} m^{3} (380,000 acre⋅ft)
- Surface elevation: 1,750 m (5,740 ft)

Orto-Tokoy Reservoir or Orto-Tokoi Reservoir (Kyrgyz: Ортотокой суу сактагычы), is a reservoir of the Chu River, located in Kochkor District of Naryn Region of Kyrgyzstan. It has a surface area of 24 km ^{2} and a maximum volume of 470 × 10^{6} meters ^{3}.

== See also ==
- Kasan-Sai Reservoir (formerly called the Orto-Tokoy Reservoir)
