= Novovoznesenovka =

Novovoznesenovka Нововознесеновка
- Village
- Location within Kyrgyzstan
- Coordinates: 42°35′10″N 78°44′40″E
- Country: Kyrgyzstan
- Region: Issyk-Kul Region
- District: Ak-Suu District
- Elevation: 1,795 m (5,889 ft)

Population (2023)
  - Total: 3,647
- Time zone: UTC+6

Novovoznesenovka is a village in the Ak-Suu District of Issyk-Kul Region of Kyrgyzstan. Its population was 3,624 in 2021.
