= Ortok =

Ortok Орток
- Location within Kyrgyzstan
- Coordinates: 42°12′0″N 75°21′36″E
- Country: Kyrgyzstan
- Region: Naryn Region
- District: Kochkor District
- Elevation: 2,040 m (6,690 ft)

Population (2021)
  - Total: 1,297
- Time zone: UTC+6

Ortok (Kyrgyz: Орток) is a village in Kochkor District, Naryn Region of Kyrgyzstan. Its population was 1,297 in 2021.
