= Ak-Tal, Ak-Talaa =

Ak-Tal Ак-Тал
- Location within Kyrgyzstan
- Coordinates: 41°24′48″N 75°03′22″E
- Country: Kyrgyzstan
- Region: Naryn
- District: Ak-Talaa

Population (2021)
  - Total: 1,409

Ak-Tal (Kyrgyz: Ак-Тал) is a village in Ak-Talaa District of Naryn Region of Kyrgyzstan. Its population was 1409 in 2021.
