= Ak-Jar, Kochkor =

Ak-Jar Ак-Жар
- Location within Kyrgyzstan
- Coordinates: 42°12′55″N 75°36′49″E
- Country: Kyrgyzstan
- Region: Naryn Region
- District: Kochkor District
- Elevation: 1,870 m (6,140 ft)

Population (2021)
  - Total: 2,207
- Time zone: UTC+6

Ak-Jar is a village in Kochkor District of Naryn Region of Kyrgyzstan. Its population was 2,207 in 2021.
