= Ak-Tam =

- Location within Kyrgyzstan
- Coordinates: 41°28′10″N 71°36′0″E
- Country: Kyrgyzstan
- Region: Jalal-Abad Region
- District: Ala-Buka District

Population (2021)
  - Total: 5,404
- Time zone: UTC+6

Ak-Tam (Kyrgyz: Ак-Там) is a village in Jalal-Abad Region of Kyrgyzstan. It is part of the Ala-Buka District. Its population was 5,404 in 2021.

== Population ==
Historical population
Year	Pop.	±% p.a.
2009	4,324	—
2021	5,404	+1.88%
Note: resident population; Sources:
