= Ügüt =

Ügüt Үгүт
- Location within Kyrgyzstan
- Coordinates: 41°24′38″N 74°50′37″E
- Country: Kyrgyzstan
- Region: Naryn
- District: Ak-Talaa

Population (2021)
  - Total: 1,584

Ügüt (Kyrgyz: Үгүт) is a village in Ak-Talaa District of Naryn Region of Kyrgyzstan. Its population was 1036 in 2021.
