= Charbak, Kyrgyzstan =

Charbak
- Location within Kyrgyzstan
- Coordinates: 41°15′20″N 73°0′20″E
- Country: Kyrgyzstan
- Region: Jalal-Abad
- District: Bazar-Korgon
- Elevation: 1,031 m (3,383 ft)

Population (2021)
  - Total: 5,743
- Time zone: UTC+6

Charbak is a village in Jalal-Abad Region of Kyrgyzstan. It is part of the Bazar-Korgon District. Its population was 5,743 in 2021.

== Population ==
Historical population
Year	Pop.	±% p.a.
2009	4,391	—
2021	5,743	+2.26%
Note: resident population; Sources:
