= Baetov =

Baetov Баетов
- Coat of arms

- Location within Kyrgyzstan
- Coordinates: 41°12′36″N 74°54′0″E
- Country: Kyrgyzstan
- Region: Naryn Region
- District: Ak-Talaa District
- Elevation: 2,063 m (6,768 ft)

Population (2021)
  - Total: 10,682
- Time zone: UTC+6

Baetov (Kyrgyz: Баетов; Russian: Баетово, until 1980 Dyurbeldzhin) is a village and the administrative seat of Ak-Talaa District in Naryn Region of Kyrgyzstan. Its population was 10,682 in 2021. It lies on the Naryn valley road about half-way from Naryn to Kazarman. At this point, a road branches south to Baetov on an outwash plain in the mountains. A jeep road goes south over a 3,268m pass to the At-Bashy valley and A365 to the Torugart Pass.

== Population ==
Historical population
| Year | Pop. | ±% p.a. |
|---|---|---|
| 2009 | 8,354 | — |
| 2021 | 10,682 | +2.07% |
Note: resident population; Sources:
