= Kum-Döbö =

Kum-Döbö Кум-Дөбө
- Location within Kyrgyzstan
- Coordinates: 42°13′16″N 75°33′00″E
- Country: Kyrgyzstan
- Region: Naryn Region
- District: Kochkor District
- Elevation: 1,915 m (6,283 ft)

Population (2021)
  - Total: 4,137
- Time zone: UTC+6

Kum-Döbö is a village in Kochkor District of Naryn Region of Kyrgyzstan. Its population was 4,137 in 2021.
