= Döng-Alysh =

Döng-Alysh Дөң-Алыш
- Location within Kyrgyzstan
- Coordinates: 42°15′0″N 75°13′48″E
- Country: Kyrgyzstan
- Region: Naryn Region
- District: Kochkor District
- Elevation: 2,277 m (7,470 ft)

Population (2021)
  - Total: 3,247
- Time zone: UTC+6

Döng-Alysh is a village in Naryn Region of Kyrgyzstan. It is part of the Kochkor District. Its population was 3,247 in 2021.
