= Kara-Künggöy, Naryn =

Kara-Künggöy Кара-Күңгөй
- Location within Kyrgyzstan
- Coordinates: 42°12′0″N 75°54′36″E
- Country: Kyrgyzstan
- Region: Naryn
- District: Kochkor
- Elevation: 2,027 m (6,650 ft)

Population (2021)
  - Total: 2,016
- Time zone: UTC+6

Kara-Künggöy (Kyrgyz: Кара-Күңгөй) is a village in the Naryn Region of Kyrgyzstan. It is part of the Kochkor District. Its population was 2,016 in 2021.
