= Orlovka, Kyrgyzstan =

Orlovka Kyrgyz: Кыраанды / Kyraandy
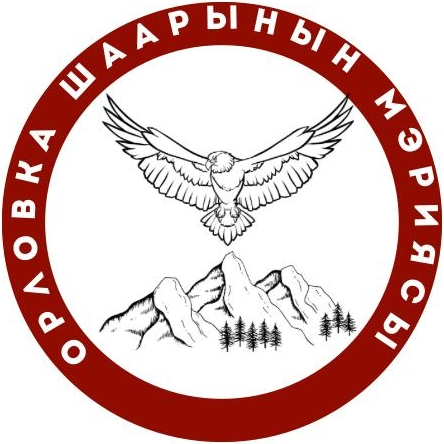
- Flag Seal

- Location in Kyrgyzstan
- Coordinates: 42°44′50″N 75°35′20″E
- Country: Kyrgyzstan
- Region: Chüy Region
- District: Kemin District
- Established: 1910

Population (2021)
  - Total: 6,167

Orlovka is a city in Kemin District of Chüy Region. Its population was 6,167 in 2021. It is the center of Orlovka municipal council that also includes Podgornoye village. Orlovka was established in 1910. It became a city in 2012.

== Population ==
Historical population
Year	Pop.	±% p.a.
1970	8,295	—
1979	9,390	+1.39%
1989	12,011	+2.49%
1999	9,807	−2.01%
2009	6,260	−4.39%
2021	6,167	−0.12%
Note: resident population; Sources:

== Ski Resort ==
Orlovka
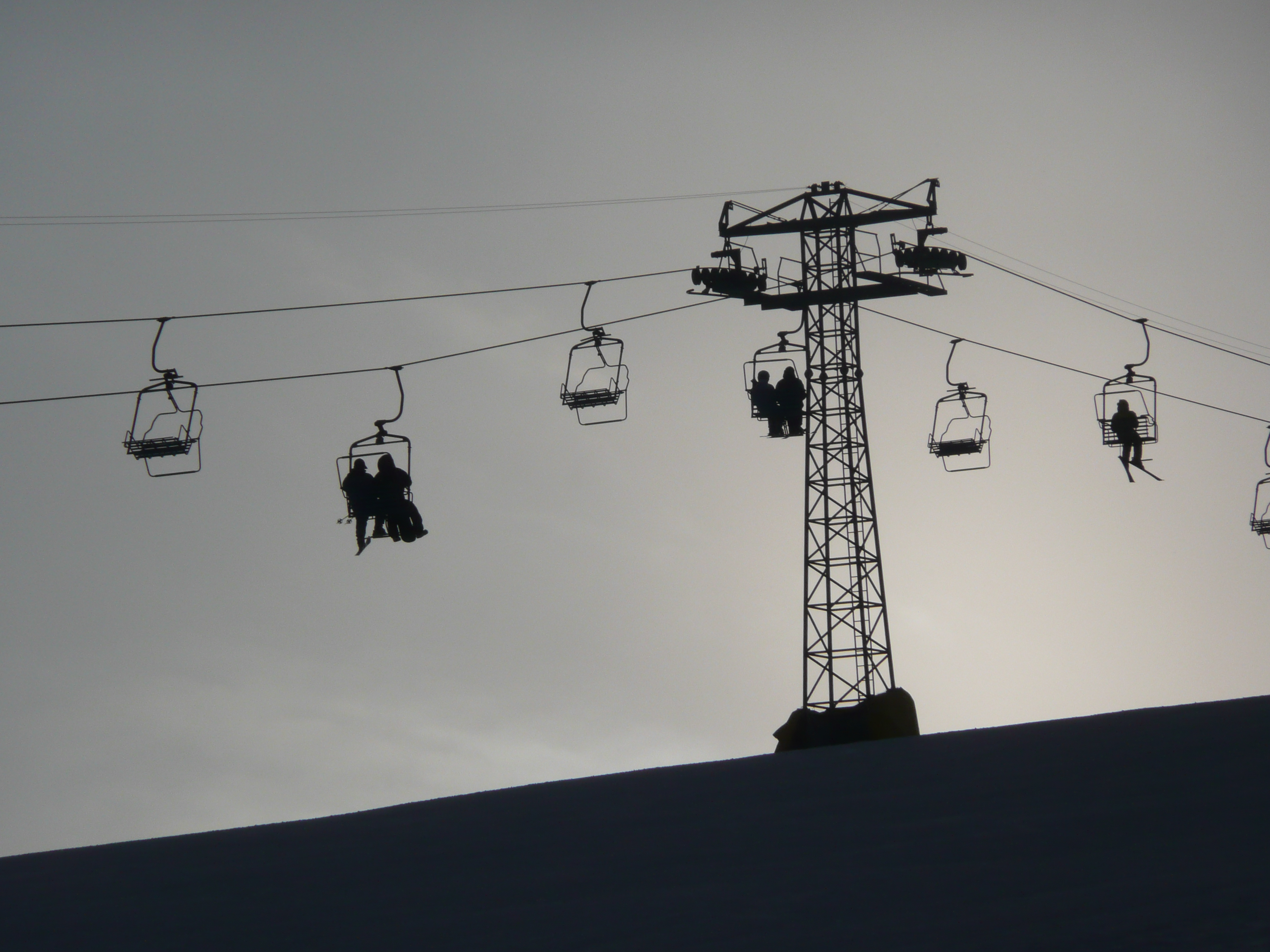
- Chairlift in Orlovka
- Interactive map of Orlovka
- Location: Tien Shan
- Vertical: 300 m (980 ft)
- Top elevation: 1,600 m (5,200 ft)
- Base elevation: 1,300 m (4,300 ft)
- Trails: 1 red, 1 blue and 1 green
- Longest run: 1,200 m (3,900 ft)
- Lift system: 2 consecutive chairlifts and 1 ski tow
- Night skiing: 1 Ski slope
- Website: www.orlovka.com

The village is well known for its ski resort thanks especially to its relative proximity to Bishkek (approx. 100 km), its night skiing facility as well as its regular treatment with snow groomers and snow cannons.

The resort has three primary ski slopes: red (800m + 400m long), blue (1200m) and green (200m). Two consecutive chairlifts and one ski tow operate there. The maximum height difference is around 300m.
