= Bayastan =

Bayastan Баястан
- Location within Kyrgyzstan
- Coordinates: 41°20′N 71°35′E
- Country: Kyrgyzstan
- Region: Jalal-Abad
- District: Ala-Buka

Population (2021)
  - Total: 6,600
- Time zone: UTC+6

Bayastan (Kyrgyz: Баястан, before 2004: Маданият Madaniyat) is a village in Jalal-Abad Region of Kyrgyzstan. It is part of the Ala-Buka District. Its population was 6,600 in 2021.

== Population ==
Historical population
Year	Pop.	±% p.a.
2009	5,057	—
2021	6,600	+2.24%
Note: resident population; Sources:
