= Kök-Jar, Kochkor =

Kök-Jar Көк-Жар
- Location within Kyrgyzstan
- Coordinates: 42°11′6″N 75°39′7″E
- Country: Kyrgyzstan
- Region: Naryn Region
- District: Kochkor District
- Elevation: 1,850 m (6,070 ft)

Population (2021)
  - Total: 2,880
- Time zone: UTC+6

Kök-Jar (Kyrgyz: Көк-Жар [kœkdʒɑ́r]) is a village in Kochkor District, Naryn Region of Kyrgyzstan, just to the south-west of Kochkor. Its population was 2,880 in 2021.
