= Kara-Saz =

Kara-Saz Кара-Саз
- Location within Kyrgyzstan
- Coordinates: 42°11′56″N 75°53′10″E
- Country: Kyrgyzstan
- Region: Naryn Region
- District: Kochkor District
- Elevation: 1,985 m (6,512 ft)

Population (2021)
  - Total: 1,743
- Time zone: UTC+6

Kara-Saz (Kyrgyz: Кара-Саз) is a village, center of Kosh-Döbö rural community of Kochkor District of Naryn Region, Kyrgyzstan. Its population was 1,743 in 2021.
