= Jerge-Tal, Ak-Talaa =

Jerge-Tal Жерге-Тал
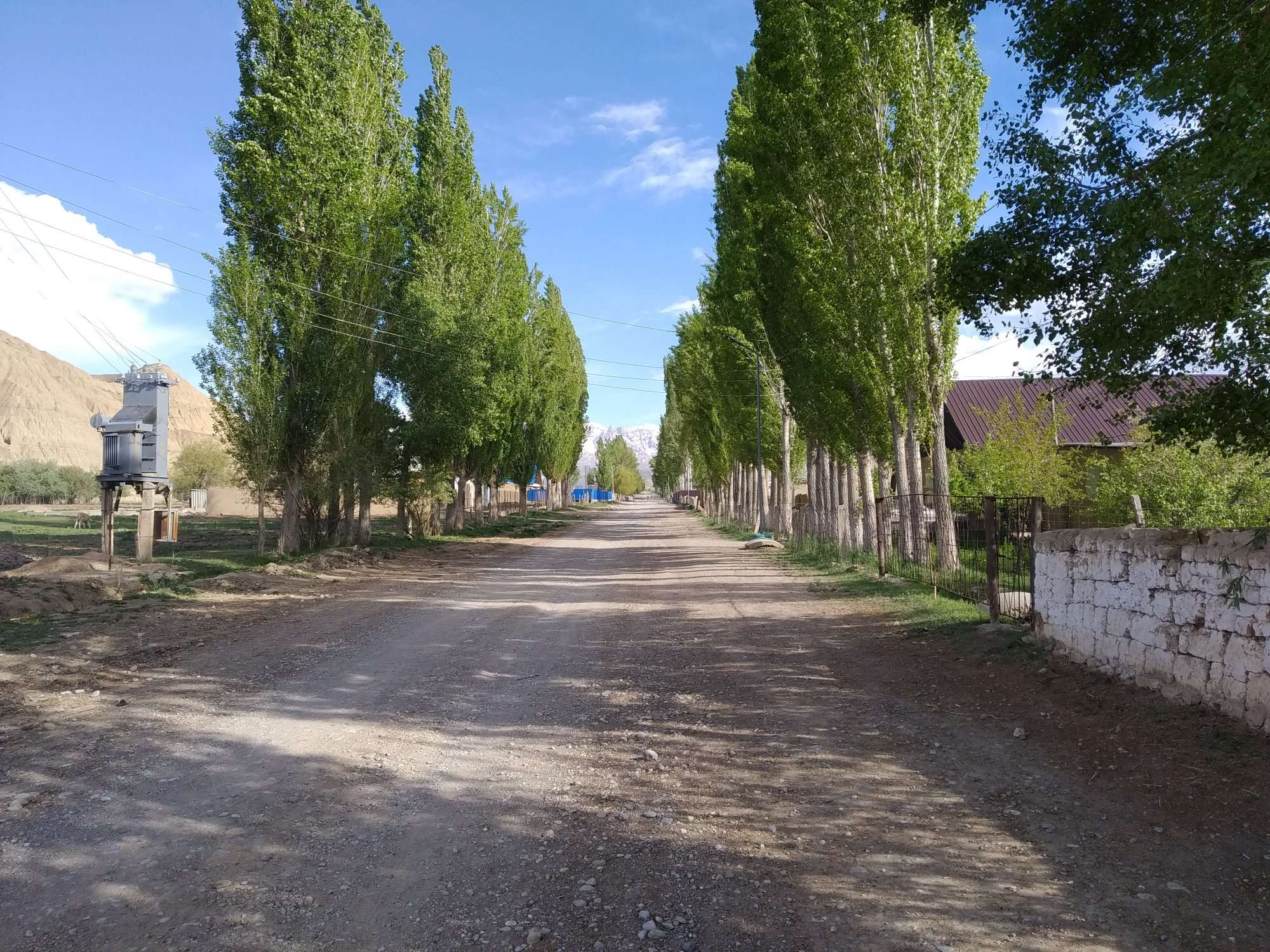
- Jerge-Tal village

- Location within Kyrgyzstan
- Coordinates: 41°07′46″N 74°24′18″E
- Country: Kyrgyzstan
- Region: Naryn
- District: Ak-Talaa

Population (2021)
  - Total: 585

Jerge-Tal (Kyrgyz: Жерге-Тал) is a village in Ak-Talaa District of Naryn Region of Kyrgyzstan. Its population was 585 in 2021. The road of national significance М-074 (as per the national road classification) passes near the village.
