= Changgyr-Tash =

Changgyr-Tash Чаңгыр-Таш
- Location in Kyrgyzstan
- Coordinates: 40°51′50″N 72°45′25″E
- Country: Kyrgyzstan
- Region: Jalal-Abad
- District: Suzak
- Elevation: 654 m (2,146 ft)

Population (2021)
  - Total: 4,845
- Time zone: UTC+6

Changgyr-Tash (Kyrgyz: Чаңгыр-Таш) is a village in Jalal-Abad Region of Kyrgyzstan. It is part of the Suzak District. Its population was 4,845 in 2021.
