= Ayry-Tam =

Ayry-Tam Айры-Там
- Location within Kyrgyzstan
- Coordinates: 41°07′40″N 71°24′30″E
- Country: Kyrgyzstan
- Region: Jalal-Abad
- District: Ala-Buka

Population (2021)
  - Total: 5,864
- Time zone: UTC+6

Ayry-Tam (Kyrgyz: Айры-Там, formerly Pervomayskoye) is a village in Jalal-Abad Region of Kyrgyzstan. It is part of the Ala-Buka District. Its population was 5,864 in 2021.

== Population ==
Historical population
Year	Pop.	±% p.a.
2009	4,377	—
2021	5,864	+2.47%
Note: resident population; Sources:
