= Ala-Buka District =

Coordinates: 41°24′29″N 71°27′47″E

Ala-Buka Ала-Бука району
- District
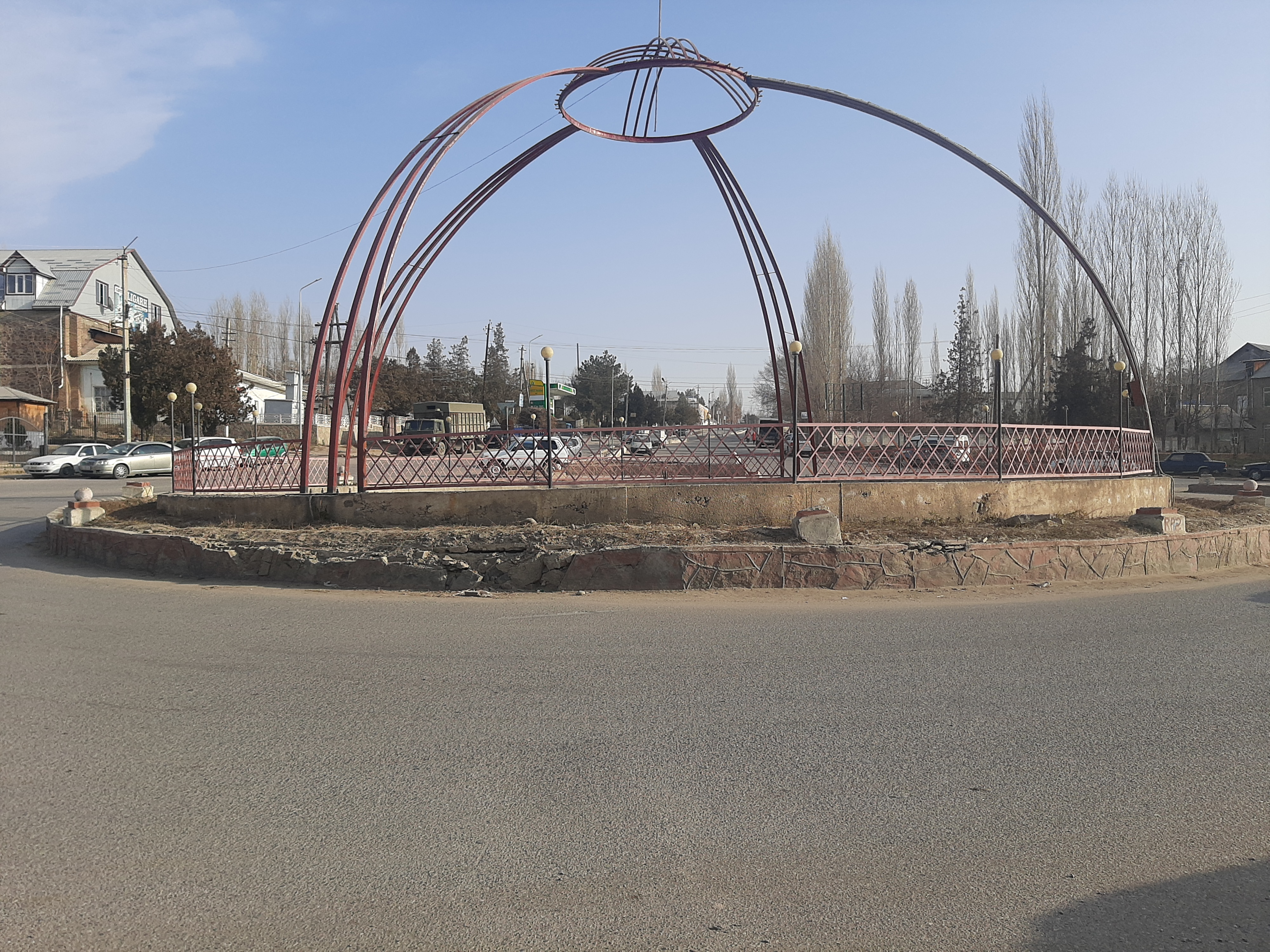

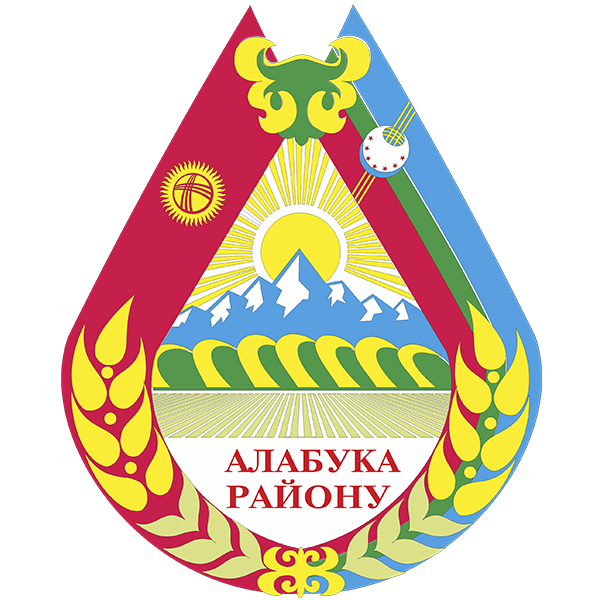
- Flag Seal

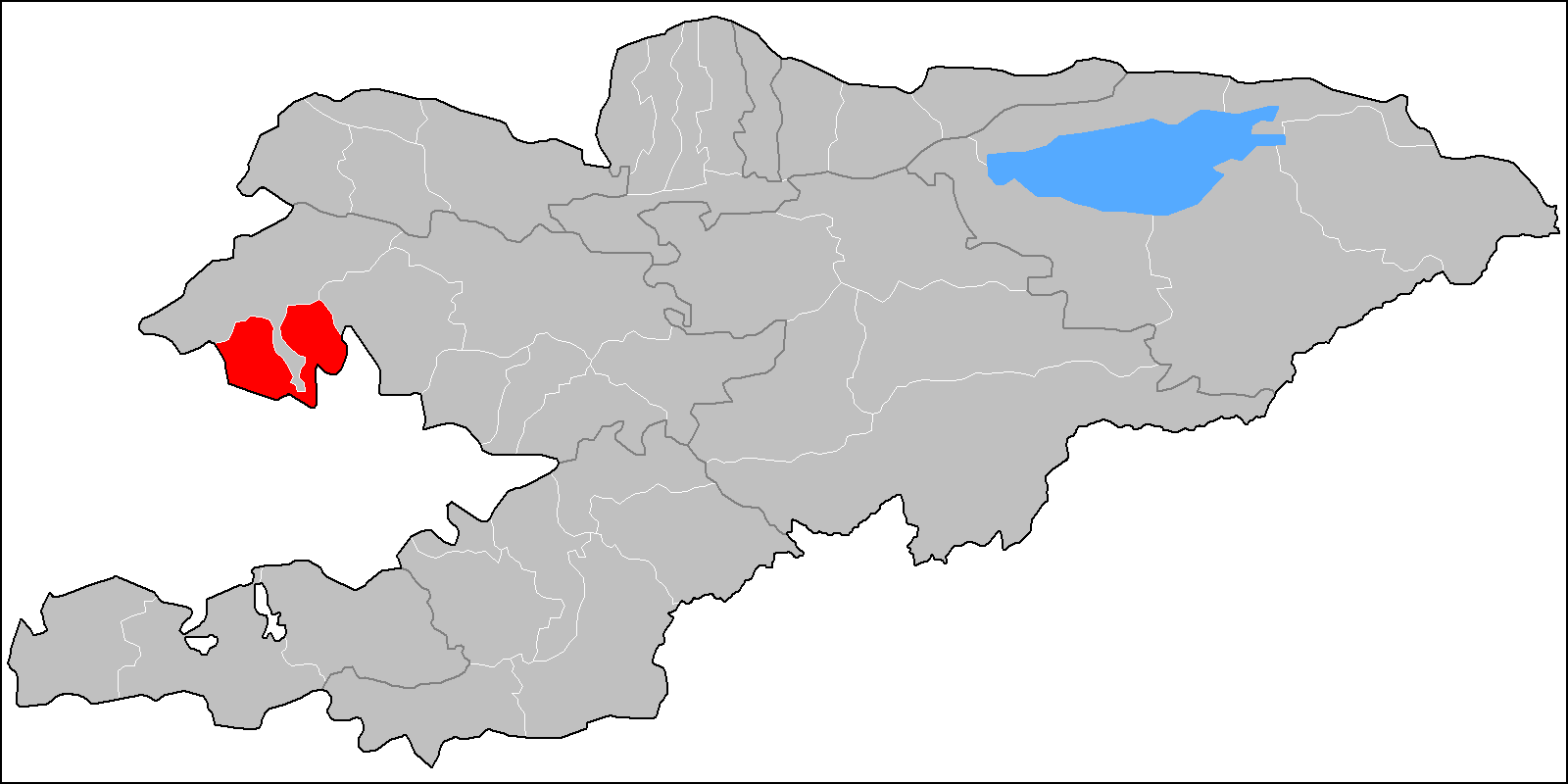
- Country: Kyrgyzstan
- Region: Jalal-Abad Region

Area
  - Total: 2,976 km^{2} (1,149 sq mi)

Population (2021)
  - Total: 108,647
  - Density: 36.51/km^{2} (94.55/sq mi)
- Time zone: UTC+6

Ala-Buka (Kyrgyz: Ала-Бука району) is a district of Jalal-Abad Region in western Kyrgyzstan. The seat lies at Ala-Buka. Its area is 2,976 square kilometres (1,149 sq mi), and its resident population was 108,647 in 2021.

== Population ==
Historical population
| Year | Pop. | ±% p.a. |
|---|---|---|
| 1970 | 30,970 | — |
| 1979 | 41,223 | +3.23% |
| 1989 | 54,636 | +2.86% |
| 1999 | 72,589 | +2.88% |
| 2009 | 87,460 | +1.88% |
| 2021 | 108,647 | +1.82% |
Note: resident population; Sources:

== Populated places ==
Ala-Buka District, in its entirety, encompassed 42 villages within 8 rural communities (ayyl aymagy). Each rural community can be composed of one or several villages. The rural communities and settlements in the Ala-Buka District are:

1. Ak-Korgon (seat: Ak-Korgon; incl. Bayastan, Padek and Safedbulan)
2. Ak-Tam (seat: Ak-Tam; incl. Japa-Saldy and Kyzyl-Ata)
3. Ala-Buka (seat: Ala-Buka; incl. Dostuk, Sapalak and Sary-Talaa)
4. Birinchi May (seat: Ayry-Tam; incl. Ak-Bashat, Alma-Bel, Jangy-Shaar, Kara-Üngkür, Ajek and Sovet-Say)
5. Kök-Serek (seat: Tenggi; incl. Ak-Taylak, Birleshken, Kosh-Bolot, Sary-Kol and Tölökö)
6. Kök-Tash (seat: Kök-Tash; incl. Bulak-Bashy, Jalgyz-Örük, Külpök-Say, Orto-Suu and Chong-Say)
7. Örüktü (seat: Örüktü; incl. Kengkol, Orto-Tokoy, Örüktü-Say and Cholok-Tuma)
8. Törögeldi Baltagulov (seat: Yzar; incl. Baymak, Kashkalak, Kelte, Kosh-Almurut, Kosh-Terek and Kajar)
Settlements of the Ala-Buka District.
