= Petrovka, Kyrgyzstan =

Petrovka Петровка
- Location within Kyrgyzstan
- Coordinates: 42°50′20″N 74°01′10″E
- Country: Kyrgyzstan
- Region: Chüy
- District: Moskva

Population (2021)
  - Total: 10,879
- Time zone: UTC+6

Petrovka (Kyrgyz: Петровка) is a village in Chüy Region of Kyrgyzstan. It is part of the Moskva District. Its population was 10,879 in 2021.

== Population ==
Historical population
Year	Pop.	±% p.a.
2009	9,016	—
2021	10,879	+1.58%
Note: resident population; Sources:
