= Safedbulan =

Safedbulan Сафедбулан
- Location in Kyrgyzstan
- Coordinates: 41°25′43″N 71°39′32″E
- Country: Kyrgyzstan
- Region: Jalal-Abad
- District: Ala-Buka

Population (2021)
  - Total: 6,707
- Time zone: UTC+6 (KGT)

Safedbulan (Kyrgyz: Сафедбулан, before 2004: Гулистан Gulistan) is a village in Ala-Buka District, Jalal-Abad Region, Kyrgyzstan. Its population was 6,707 in 2021. It is also an archaeological reserve that is considered sacred for Muslims. The village is in an area in the north-western part of the Fergana Valley, on the border with Uzbekistan. It lies on the river Chanachsay, 14 km east of Ala-Buka and 11 km southwest of Kerben. The settlement is at least one thousand years old and is mentioned in medieval, Arabic and Persian scriptures under the name Isbid Bulan.

== History ==
The village of Safedbulan is named after Bulan (woman), a black African maiden. According to legend, Bulan came to the lands of Central Asia with the army of Arabic warriors led by her beloved and, perhaps, her master, Shah-Jarir (grandson of Muhammad).

Apparently this wave of the Muslim conquests was a successful one, since historical sources tell that the local tribal inhabitants "pretended to accept" a new religion of Islam.

According to the legend, the locals attacked while the Arabs had laid down their weapons for their Friday prayers. While some warriors were able to flee, many defenseless Arabs were beheaded on the spot.

Bulan unsuccessfully searched for her lover who, it is believed, had fled back to Arabia. Though everyone was prohibited from burying the dead, Bulan gathered the 2700 heads of the decapitated Arabs, washed them of blood in the river and buried them all. She was blessed for her deed by becoming completely white all over. Hence the name: Safed (or safid) Bulan (or Bulon)(White Woman). Some historians believe that Safed Bulan's hair turned white due to the shock she had experienced witnessing the massacre.

When Safed Bulan died, she was buried near the slain Arab warriors. Her grave became a place of pilgrimage, or a mazar ( Arabic for holy mausoleum). Kirin mechet, the place where the warriors were beheaded, stands nearby on the left. According to the legend, the rock that stands at the mazar's entry marks the exact spot where Safed Bulan washed the heads of the warriors.

Women visit the mausoleum to pray and ask for Safed-Bulan's blessings. Those who have a hard time conceiving children visit in order to touch the "fertility rock" that lies in the small yard of the mausoleum.

Ferghana's ruler Shah Fazil (born:Mahmud Ibn Nasir, a firm believer in Islam and a son of Shah Jarir) is also buried nearby in the 11th-12th century Shakh Fazil mausoleum that is named after him. His mausoleum is a place of pilgrimage as well; it contains Islamic art, Arabic ornaments, passages from the Qur'an and quotes in Persian. The Shah Fazil mausoleum is on the wait list to be added to the UNESCO registry. Descriptions of the site appear in several scholarly studies.

In 2002, the U.S. Embassy in Kyrgyzstan funded a restoration of the mausoleum.

"The tale of Safed Bulan" (Сафед Булон қиссаси), a literary document written by Shah Khakim Halisa in 1811, is a historical resource that offers information on various mazars of Central Asia.

== Population ==
Historical population
Year	Pop.	±% p.a.
2009	5,102	—
2021	6,707	+2.31%
Note: resident population; Sources:
