= Kashgar-Kyshtak =

Village in Osh Region, Kyrgyzstan

Kashgar-Kyshtak Kyrgyz: Кашгар-Кыштак
- Location within Kyrgyzstan
- Coordinates: 40°37′12″N 72°49′48″E
- Country: Kyrgyzstan
- Region: Osh Region
- District: Kara-Suu District
- Elevation: 864 m (2,835 ft)

Population (2021)
  - Total: 20,334
- Time zone: UTC+6

Kashgar-Kyshtak (Kyrgyz: Кашгар-Кыштак) is a village, center of Kashgar-Kyshtak rural community in Kara-Suu District of Osh Region of Kyrgyzstan. Its population was 20,334 in 2021. The ancient settlement Kashgar-Kyshtak is located in proximity to the village.

== Population ==
Historical population
Year	Pop.	±% p.a.
2009	16,280	—
2021	20,334	+1.87%
Note: resident population; Sources:
