= Myrza-Ake =

Myrza-Ake Мырза-Аке
- Location within Kyrgyzstan
- Coordinates: 40°45′0″N 73°24′36″E
- Country: Kyrgyzstan
- Region: Osh
- District: Özgön
- Elevation: 1,053 m (3,455 ft)

Population (2021)
  - Total: 16,011
- Time zone: UTC+6

Myrza-Ake is a large village in the Osh Region of Kyrgyzstan. It is part of the Özgön District. Its population was 16,011 in 2021.

== Population ==
Historical population
Year	Pop.	±% p.a.
2009	15,071	—
2021	16,011	+0.51%
Note: resident population; Sources:

== Climate ==
In Myrza-Ake, the climate is cold and temperate. There is more rainfall in winter than in summer. The Köppen-Geiger climate classification is Dsa. The average annual temperature in Myrza-Ake is 11.0 °C (51.8 °F). About 513 mm (20.20 in) of precipitation falls annually.

Climate data for Myrza-Ake
Month	Jan	Feb	Mar	Apr	May	Jun	Jul	Aug	Sep	Oct	Nov	Dec	Year
Mean daily maximum °C (°F)	0.2 (32.4)	3.1 (37.6)	11.0 (51.8)	19.7 (67.5)	24.9 (76.8)	29.7 (85.5)	31.7 (89.1)	30.3 (86.5)	25.9 (78.6)	18.6 (65.5)	9.9 (49.8)	2.5 (36.5)	17.3 (63.1)
Mean daily minimum °C (°F)	−9.6 (14.7)	−6.9 (19.6)	0.3 (32.5)	7.3 (45.1)	11.7 (53.1)	15.1 (59.2)	16.9 (62.4)	15.2 (59.4)	10.3 (50.5)	4.4 (39.9)	−1.5 (29.3)	−6.3 (20.7)	4.7 (40.5)
Average precipitation mm (inches)	37 (1.5)	45 (1.8)	68 (2.7)	82 (3.2)	75 (3.0)	39 (1.5)	19 (0.7)	9 (0.4)	16 (0.6)	50 (2.0)	39 (1.5)	34 (1.3)	513 (20.2)
Source: Climate-Data.org, Climate data
