= Kara-Bürgön =

Kara-Bürgön Кара-Бүргөн
- Location within Kyrgyzstan
- Coordinates: 41°13′13″N 74°42′03″E
- Country: Kyrgyzstan
- Region: Naryn
- District: Ak-Talaa

Population (2021)
  - Total: 2,605

Kara-Bürgön (Kyrgyz: Кара-Бүргөн) is a village in Ak-Talaa District of Naryn Region of Kyrgyzstan. Its population was 2605 in 2021.
