= Kök-Oy, Talas =

Kök-Oy Көк-Ой
- Location within Kyrgyzstan
- Coordinates: 42°32′50″N 72°12′40″E
- Country: Kyrgyzstan
- Region: Talas
- District: Talas

Population (2021)
  - Total: 6,904
- Time zone: UTC+6

Kök-Oy (Kyrgyz: Көк-Ой, before 2001: Ивано-Алексеевка Ivano-Alekseyevka) is a village in Talas Region of Kyrgyzstan. It is part of the Talas District. Its population was 6,904 in 2021.

== Population ==
Historical population
Year	Pop.	±% p.a.
2009	5,407	—
2021	6,904	+2.06%
Note: resident population; Sources:
