= Ottuk, Issyk Kul =

Ottuk Оттук
- village
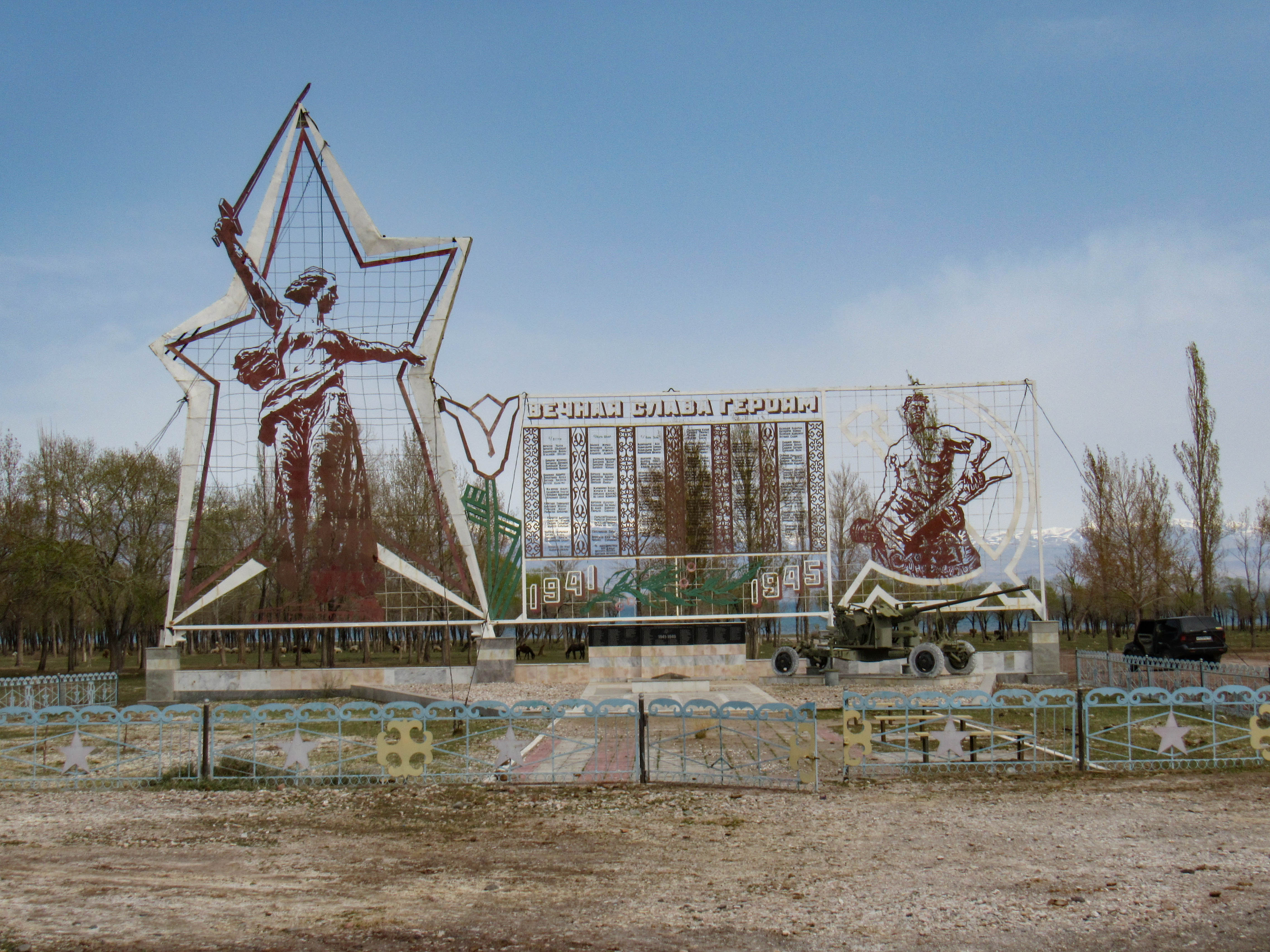

- Location within Kyrgyzstan
- Coordinates: 42°18′32″N 76°17′50″E
- Country: Kyrgyzstan
- Region: Issyk-Kul Region
- District: Tong District
- Elevation: 1,620 m (5,310 ft)

Population (2021)
  - Total: 2,561
- Time zone: UTC+6

Ottuk is a village in the Tong District of Issyk-Kul Region of Kyrgyzstan. It is located in proximity to Issyk Kul. Its population was 2,561 in 2021.
