= Mikhaylovka, Issyk Kul =

Mikhaylovka Kyrgyz: Михайловка
- Location within Kyrgyzstan
- Coordinates: 42°36′40″N 78°19′57″E
- Country: Kyrgyzstan
- Region: Issyk-Kul Region
- District: Tüp District
- Elevation: 1,650 m (5,410 ft)

Population (2021)
  - Total: 3,699

Mikhaylovka (Kyrgyz: Михайловка) is a village in the Tüp District of Issyk-Kul Region of Kyrgyzstan with population of 3,699 in 2021. It is the center of Mikhaylovka rural community.
