= Taran-Bazar =

Taran-Bazar Таран-Базар
- Location within Kyrgyzstan
- Coordinates: 41°07′36″N 73°18′32″E
- Country: Kyrgyzstan
- Region: Jalal-Abad
- District: Suzak

Population (2021)
  - Total: 3,522
- Time zone: UTC+6

Taran-Bazar (Kyrgyz: Таран-Базар) is a village in the Jalal-Abad Region of Kyrgyzstan. It is part of Suzak District. It was known as Dmitrievka until June 2003. Its population was 3,522 in 2021.
