= Tölök =

Tölök Төлөк
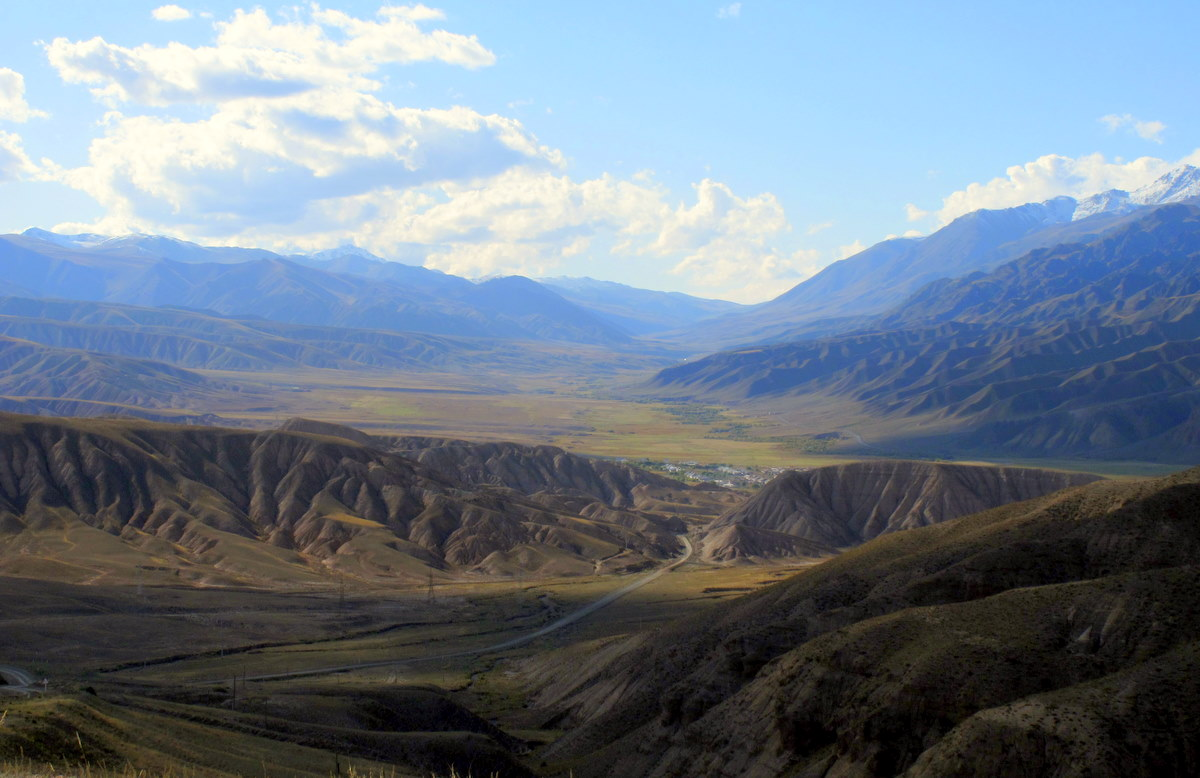

- Location within Kyrgyzstan
- Coordinates: 41°56′00″N 75°40′50″E
- Country: Kyrgyzstan
- Region: Naryn
- District: Kochkor
- Elevation: 2,815 m (9,236 ft)

Population (2021)
  - Total: 1,883
- Time zone: UTC+6

Tölök (Kyrgyz: Төлөк, also Кең-Суу Keng-Suu) is a village in Naryn Region of Kyrgyzstan. It is part of the Kochkor District. Its population was 1,883 in 2021.
