= Boz-Uchuk =

Boz-Uchuk Боз-Учук
- village
- Location within Kyrgyzstan
- Coordinates: 42°33′55″N 78°45′22″E
- Country: Kyrgyzstan
- Region: Issyk-Kul Region
- District: Ak-Suu District

Area
  - Total: 1 km^{2} (0.39 sq mi)
- Elevation: 1,860 m (6,100 ft)

Population (2023)
  - Total: 1,265
  - Density: 1,300/km^{2} (3,300/sq mi)

Boz-Uchuk is a village in the Ak-Suu District of Issyk-Kul Region of Kyrgyzstan. Its population was 1,243 in 2021.
