= Ak-Korgon =

Ak-Korgon Ак-Коргон
- Location within Kyrgyzstan
- Coordinates: 41°23′00″N 71°35′10″E
- Country: Kyrgyzstan
- Region: Jalal-Abad
- District: Ala-Buka

Population (2021)
  - Total: 8,132
- Time zone: UTC+6

Ak-Korgon (Kyrgyz: Ак-Коргон) is a village in Jalal-Abad Region of Kyrgyzstan. It is part of the Ala-Buka District. Its population was 8,132 in 2021.

== Population ==
Historical population
| Year | Pop. | ±% p.a. |
|---|---|---|
| 2009 | 6,555 | — |
| 2021 | 8,132 | +1.81% |
Note: resident population; Sources:
