= Teploklyuchenka =

Teploklyuchenka Теплоключенка
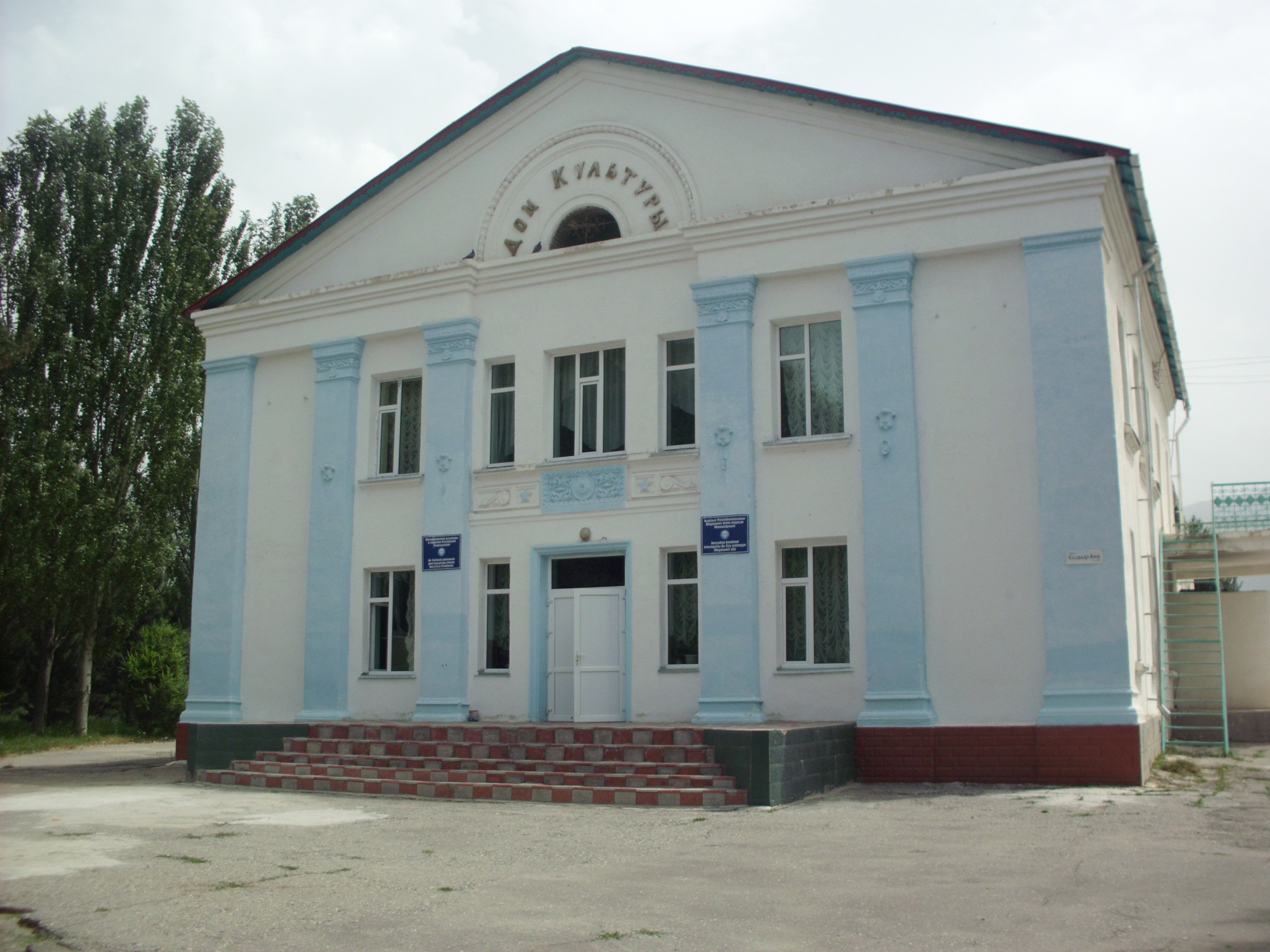

- Location within Kyrgyzstan
- Coordinates: 42°30′00″N 78°31′30″E
- Country: Kyrgyzstan
- Region: Issyk-Kul
- District: Ak-Suu
- Established: 1868

Area
  - Total: 8 km^{2} (3.1 sq mi)
- Elevation: 1,810 m (5,940 ft)

Population (2023)
  - Total: 14,055
- Time zone: UTC+6
- Website: teplokluchenka.org.kg

Teploklyuchenka (Russian: Теплоключенка, Kyrgyz: Теплоключенка, also Ак-Суу - Ak-Suu) is a large village in the Issyk-Kul Region of Kyrgyzstan with population of 14,009 in 2021. It is the administrative center of the Ak-Suu District and of the Teploklyuchenka village community. It was established in 1868, when 14 families of migrant peasants from Russian Empire settled near Aksuu Fort.

== Population ==
Historical population
Year	Pop.	±% p.a.
2009	10,823	—
2021	2,546	−11.36%
Note: resident population; Sources:
