= Kök-Jar, Ak-Talaa =

Kök-Jar Көк-Жар
- Location within Kyrgyzstan
- Coordinates: 41°27′26″N 74°49′47″E
- Country: Kyrgyzstan
- Region: Naryn
- District: Ak-Talaa

Population (2021)
  - Total: 980

Kök-Jar (Kyrgyz: Көк-Жар) is a village in Ak-Talaa District of Naryn Region of Kyrgyzstan. Its population was 980 in 2021.
