= Ak-Bulung, Ak-Suu =

Ak-Bulung Ак-Булуң
- Location within Kyrgyzstan
- Coordinates: 42°37′35″N 78°49′25″E
- Country: Kyrgyzstan
- Region: Issyk-Kul
- District: Ak-Suu
- Elevation: 1,830 m (6,000 ft)

Population (2023)
  - Total: 2,572
- Time zone: UTC+6

Ak-Bulung (Kyrgyz: Ак-Булуң) is a village in the Ak-Suu District of Issyk-Kul Region of Kyrgyzstan. Its population was 2,546 in 2021.

== Population ==
Historical population
Year	Pop.	±% p.a.
2009	1,956	—
2021	2,546	+2.22%
Note: resident population; Sources:
