= Kara-Oy, Naryn =

Kara-Oy Кара-Ой
- Location within Kyrgyzstan
- Coordinates: 41°27′34″N 75°07′09″E
- Country: Kyrgyzstan
- Region: Naryn
- District: Ak-Talaa

Population (2021)
  - Total: 3,537

Kara Oy (Kyrgyz: Кара-Ой) is a village in Ak-Talaa District of Naryn Region of Kyrgyzstan. Its population was 3537 in 2021.
