= Kadyraly =

Kadyraly Кадыралы
- Location within Kyrgyzstan
- Coordinates: 41°30′29″N 75°14′33″E
- Country: Kyrgyzstan
- Region: Naryn
- District: Ak-Talaa

Population (2021)
  - Total: 1,549

Kadyraly (Kyrgyz: Кадыралы) is a village in Ak-Talaa District of Naryn Region of Kyrgyzstan. Its population was 1549 in 2021.
