= Tösh =

Tösh Төш
- Location in Kyrgyzstan
- Coordinates: 40°52′28″N 72°38′0″E
- Country: Kyrgyzstan
- Region: Jalal-Abad
- District: Suzak

Population (2021)
  - Total: 4,579

Tösh is a village in Kara-Darya rural community, Suzak District, Jalal-Abad Region, Kyrgyzstan. Its population was 4579 in 2021.
