= Shakh Fazil =

- Location within Kyrgyzstan
- 41°25′44″N 71°39′33″E
- Type: Archaeological Complex
- Location: Safedbulan, Jalal-Abad Region
- Region: Kyrgyzstan

History
- Built: 1050-60

Designations
- Designation: UNESCO World Heritage Tentative List

The Shakh Fazil Archaeological Complex is located in the village Safedbulan, Jalal-Abad Region of Kyrgyzstan. It is a sacred Muslim site, and an annual mass pilgrimage occurs here. The name of the main building in many scholarly sources is the Tomb of Shah Fadl, and this is a major Qarakhanid tomb probably built between 1050–1060.

== Site description ==
The collection of sites is made up of the Shakh Fazil Mausoleum, Safed-Bulan Mausoleum, the holy mountain of Archa Mazar, Alamberdar Mausoleum, holy hermit's cave, an 18th/19th-century Mosque, and vertical stone phallos. The mausoleum of Shakh Fazil, the most important site in the collection, is unique in its own right and stands apart from other Karakhanid-era mausolea.

== World Heritage status ==
This site was added as an individual entry to the UNESCO World Heritage Tentative List of Kyrgyzstan on January 29, 2001 in the Cultural category. The individual enty was removed from the list in 2010, and Shakh Fazil was instead included in the serial entry "Silk Roads Sites in Kyrgyzstan".
