= Kamyshanovka =

Kamyshanovka Камышановка
- Location within Kyrgyzstan
- Coordinates: 43°13′04″N 74°14′14″E
- Country: Kyrgyzstan
- Region: Chüy Region
- District: Sokuluk District
- Established: 1912
- Elevation: 547 m (1,795 ft)

Population (2021)
  - Total: 3,196

Kamyshanovka (Russian: Камышановка; Kyrgyz: Камышановка ) is a village in the Sokuluk District of Chüy Region of Kyrgyzstan located at the Kazakhstan–Kyrgyzstan border. Its population was 1,834 in 2009, and 3,196 as of January 2021. The village was established in 1912.
