= Kosh-Döbö, Ak-Talaa =

Kosh-Döbö Кош-Дөбө
- Location within Kyrgyzstan
- Coordinates: 41°05′05″N 74°15′33″E
- Country: Kyrgyzstan
- Region: Naryn
- District: Ak-Talaa
- Elevation: 2,176 m (7,139 ft)

Population (2021)
  - Total: 4,483

Kosh-Döbö (Kyrgyz: Кош-Дөбө) is a village in Ak-Talaa District of Naryn Region of Kyrgyzstan. Its population was 4,483 in 2021. The settlement was established in 1929.
