= Tepke =

- Location within Kyrgyzstan
- Coordinates: 42°36′0″N 78°24′36″E
- Country: Kyrgyzstan
- Region: Issyk-Kul Region
- District: Ak-Suu District
- Elevation: 1,701 m (5,581 ft)

Population (2023)
  - Total: 1,028
- Time zone: UTC+6

Tepke is a village in the Issyk-Kul Region of Kyrgyzstan. It is part of Ak-Suu District. Its population was 1,065 in 2021.
