= Ak-Talaa District =

Coordinates: 41°16′00″N 74°56′48″E

Ak-Talaa
- District
- Ак-талаа району
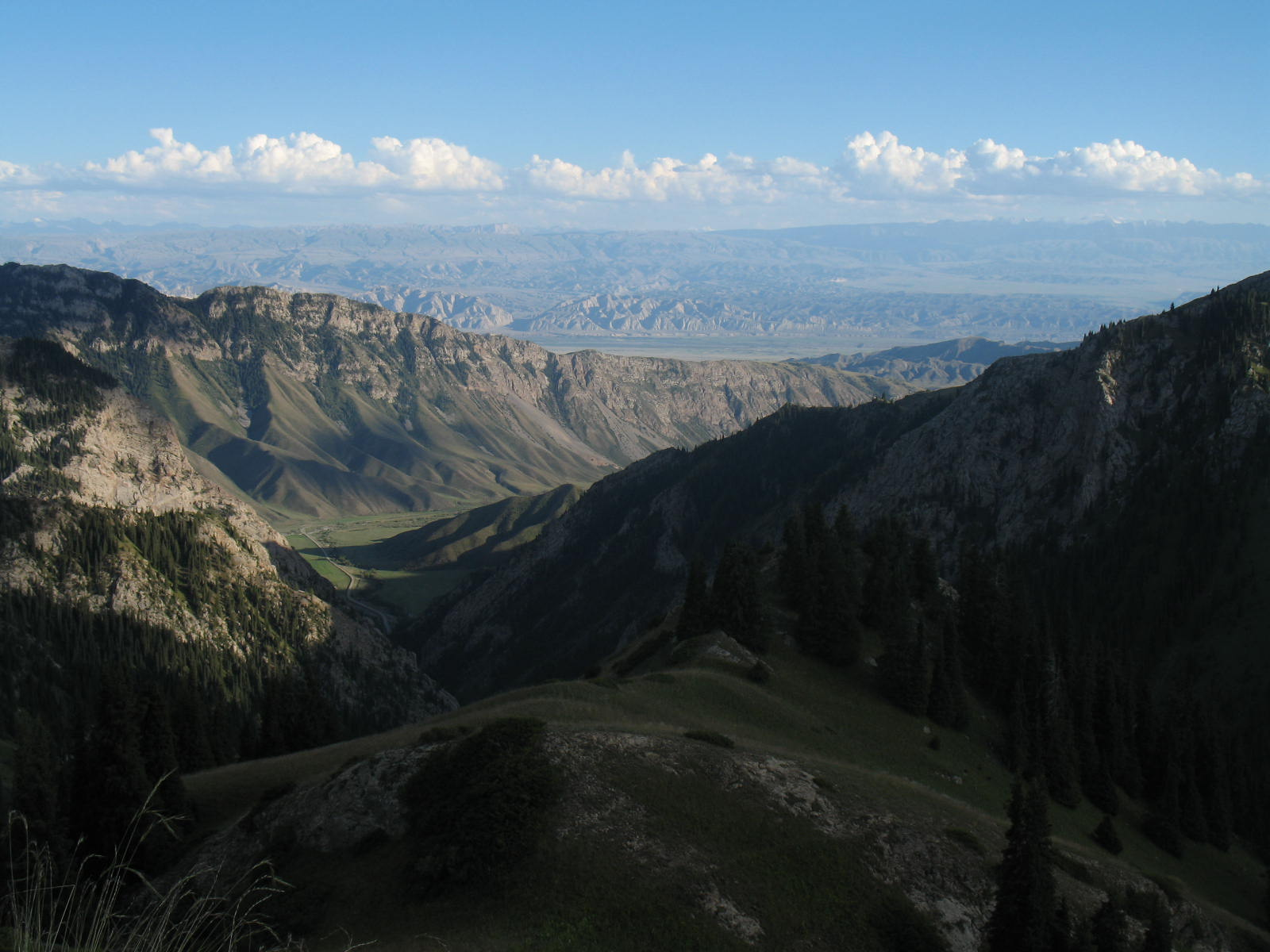
- A view south from Moldo-ashuu pass—one of the gateways into the jayloo at Song Köl.

- Coat of arms

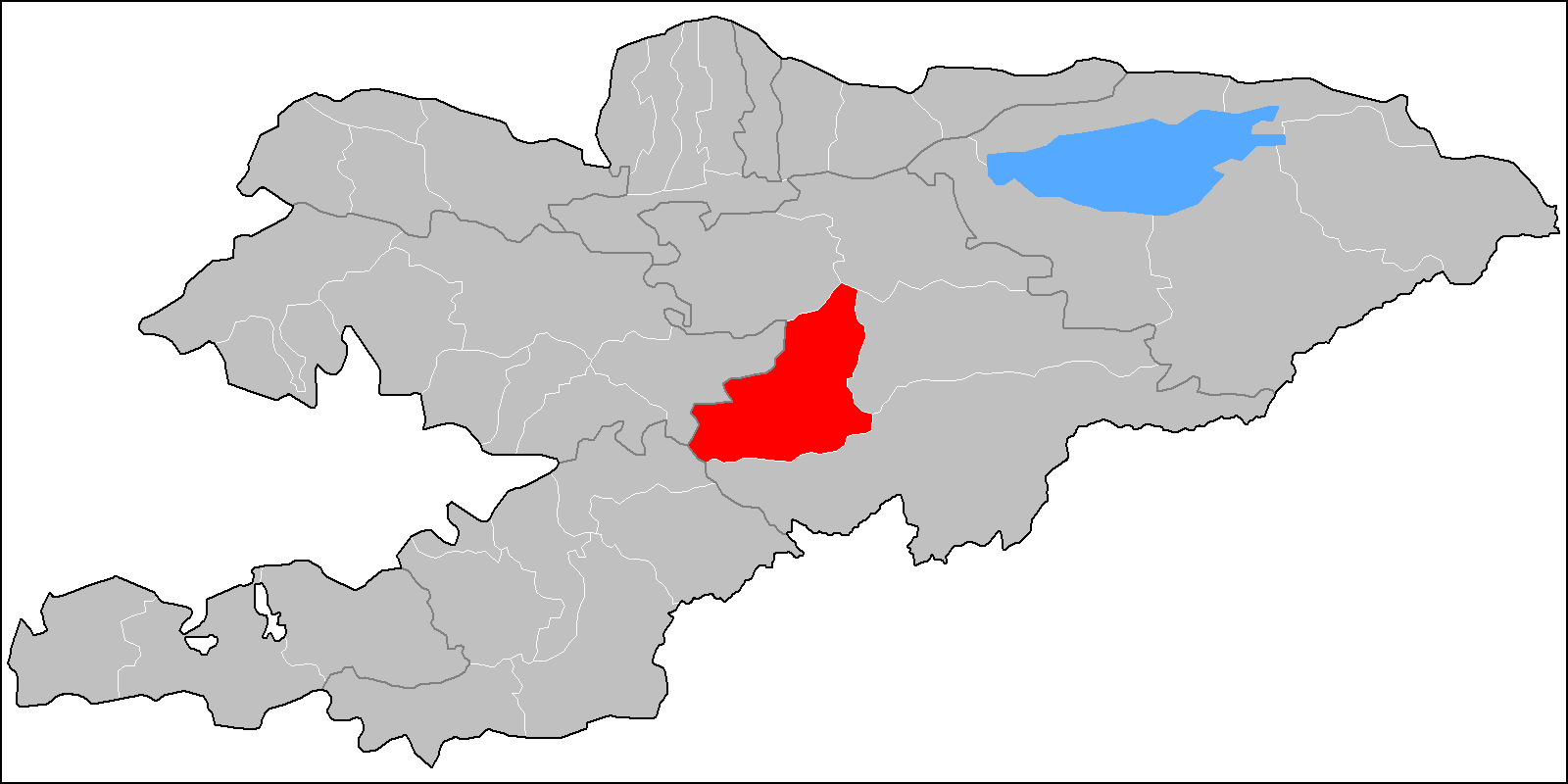
- Country: Kyrgyzstan
- Region: Naryn Region

Area
  - Total: 7,266 km^{2} (2,805 sq mi)

Population (2021)
  - Total: 33,007
  - Density: 4.543/km^{2} (11.77/sq mi)
- Time zone: UTC+6

Ak-Talaa (Kyrgyz: Ак-Талаа району, romanised: Ak-Talaa rayonu) is a district of Naryn Region in Kyrgyzstan. The administrative seat lies at Baetov. The district's resident population was 33,007 in 2021, in a total area of 7,266 square kilometres (2,805 sq mi).

== Geography ==
The district is located in the western part of Naryn Region and it is confined by Moldo Too from north and north-east, Baybiche Too from south and south-east, and the Fergana Range from west. The mountains are characterized by severely dissected topography and high gravitational energy of slopes. The differences in absolute mean sea levels ranges from 2600 m to 4737 m in mountains, and from 1500 m to 2600 m - in valleys. Approximately 87.5% of the district is occupied by mountains, and 12.5% - by valleys. The hydrological conditions are dominated by Naryn, Ala-Buga and their tributaries Terek, Jaman-Davan, Komorchok, Kurtka, Korgon, etc. Lake Song-Köl is at the northern border of the district.

== Climate ==
Minimum temperatures in winter can be as low as −25 °C in valleys, and −35 °C in mountains. In summer, maximum temperatures varies from +30°C in valleys, to +20°C in mountains. Average yearly precipitation varies from 300 mm in valleys, and up to 700 mm in mountains. Number of days with snow cover is 150–200 per year in mountains, and up to 100 - in valleys. Snow loads in mountain areas are 100–200 kg/m^{2} with maximums up to 300 kg/m^{2}. A snow cover is up to 20 cm in valleys and 40–80 cm in mountains. The maximum winds reaches 19–22 to 25 m/s in valleys, and up to 55 m/s in mountains (elevations above 3500 m).

== Population ==
Historical population
Year	Pop.	±% p.a.
1970	18,204	—
1979	22,802	+2.53%
1989	27,850	+2.02%
1999	29,227	+0.48%
2009	30,643	+0.47%
2021	33,007	+0.62%
Note: resident population; Sources:

== Rural communities and villages ==
In total, Ak-Talaa District include 19 settlements in 13 rural communities (ayyl aymagy). Each rural community can consist of one or several villages. The rural communities and settlements in the Ak-Talaa District are:

1. Ak-Tal (seat: Ak-Tal)
2. Ak-Chiy (seat: Ak-Chiy; incl. Jangy-Tilek)
3. Baetov (seat: Baetov; incl. Kayyngdy-Bulak)
4. Jangy-Talap (seat: Jangy-Talap)
5. Jerge-Tal (seat: Cholok-Kayyng; incl. Jerge-Tal)
6. Kara-Bürgön (seat: Kara-Bürgön)
7. Kök-Jar (seat: Ak-Kyya; incl. Kök-Jar)
8. Kongorchok (seat: Kongorchok)
9. Kosh-Döbö (seat: Kosh-Döbö)
10. Kyzyl-Beles (seat: Kadyraly)
11. Terek (seat: Terek; incl. Orto-Syrt)
12. Togolok-Moldo (seat: Kara-Oy)
13. Ügüt (seat: Ügüt; incl. Baygönchok)
Settlements of the Ak-Talaa District..
