= Kochkor District =

Coordinates: 42°13′N 75°45′E

Kochkor Кочкор району
- District
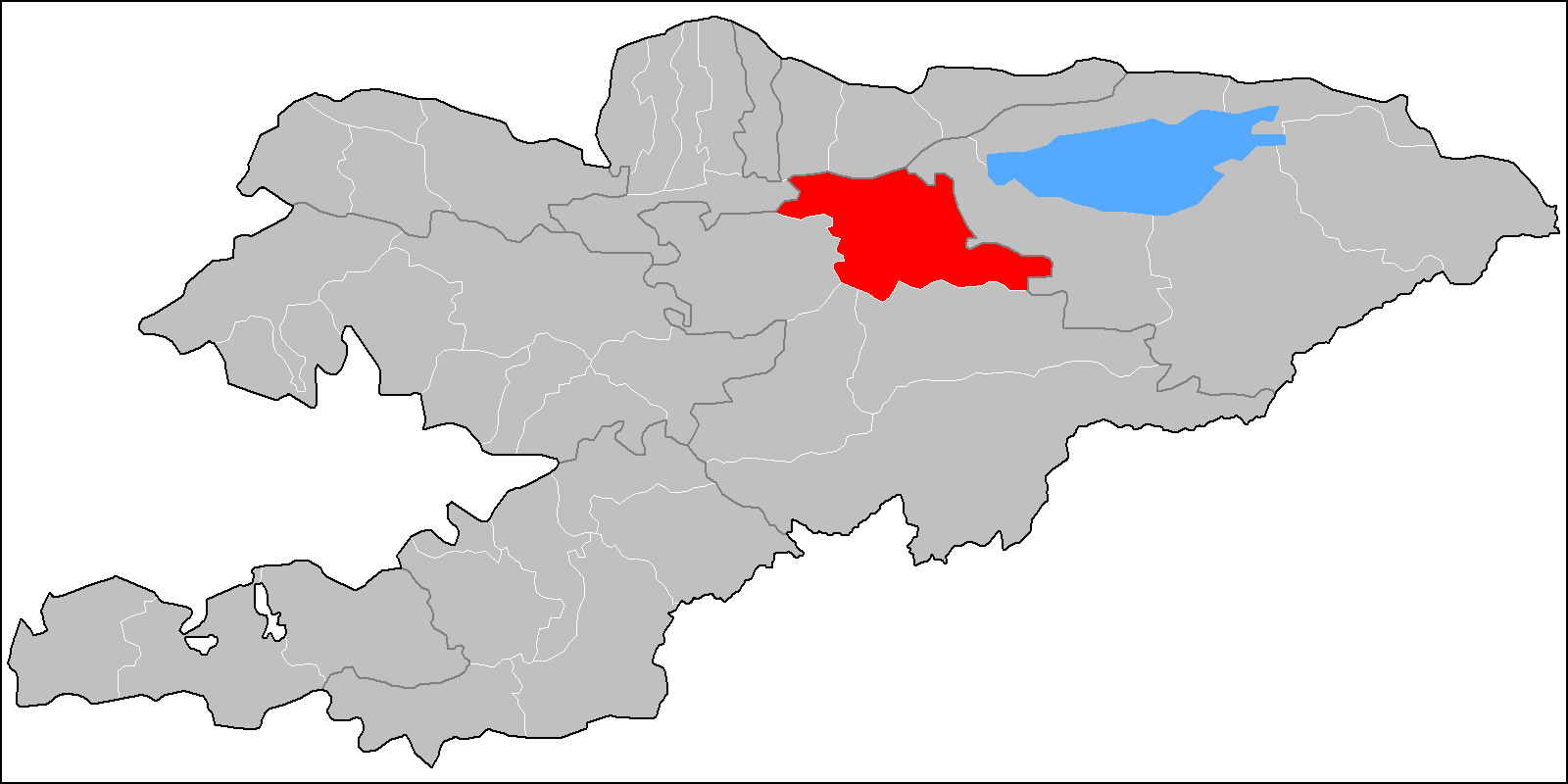
- Country: Kyrgyzstan
- Region: Naryn Region

Area
  - Total: 5,868 km^{2} (2,266 sq mi)

Population (2021)
  - Total: 67,363
  - Density: 11.48/km^{2} (29.73/sq mi)
- Time zone: UTC+6

Kochkor (Kyrgyz: Кочкор району) is a district of Naryn Region in northern-central Kyrgyzstan. The administrative seat lies at Kochkor. Its area is 5,868 km^{2} (2,266 sq mi), and its resident population was 67,363 in 2021.

== Population ==
Historical population
Year	Pop.	±% p.a.
1970	39,798	—
1979	47,206	+1.91%
1989	51,523	+0.88%
1999	53,089	+0.30%
2009	58,267	+0.94%
2021	67,363	+1.22%
Note: resident population; Sources:

== Populated places ==
In total, Kochkor District includes 35 settlements in 11 rural communities (ayyl aymagy). Each rural community comprises one or several villages. The rural communities and settlements in the Kochkor District are as follows:

1. Ak-Kyya (seat: Kara-Suu; incl. Jangy-Jol)
2. Cholpon (seat: Cholpon; incl. Ara-Köl, Osoviakhim, Tuz, Epkin, Ak-Chiy, Oro-Bashy, Tarmal-Saz and Uzun-Bulak)
3. Kara-Suu (seat: Mantysh; incl. Ak-Talaa, Kara-Moynok, Kyzyl-Döbö and Ortok)
4. Kochkor (seat: Kochkor; incl. Bolshevik and Tengdik)
5. Kök-Jar (seat: Kök-Jar)
6. Kosh-Döbö (seat: Kara-Saz; incl. Kara-Künggöy)
7. Kum-Döbö (seat: Kum-Döbö; incl. Ak-Jar, Buguchu and Shamshy)
8. Sary-Bulak (seat: Ak-Kyya; incl. Sary-Bulak)
9. Semiz-Bel (seat: Kara-Too; incl. Arsy, Semiz-Bel and Chekildek)
10. Song-Kul (seat: Tölök)
11. Talaa-Bulak (seat: Döng-Alysh; incl. Komsomol)
Settlements of the Kochkor District
