= Karatal-Japyryk Nature Reserve =

Nature reserve in Kyrgyzstan

- IUCN category Ia (strict nature reserve)
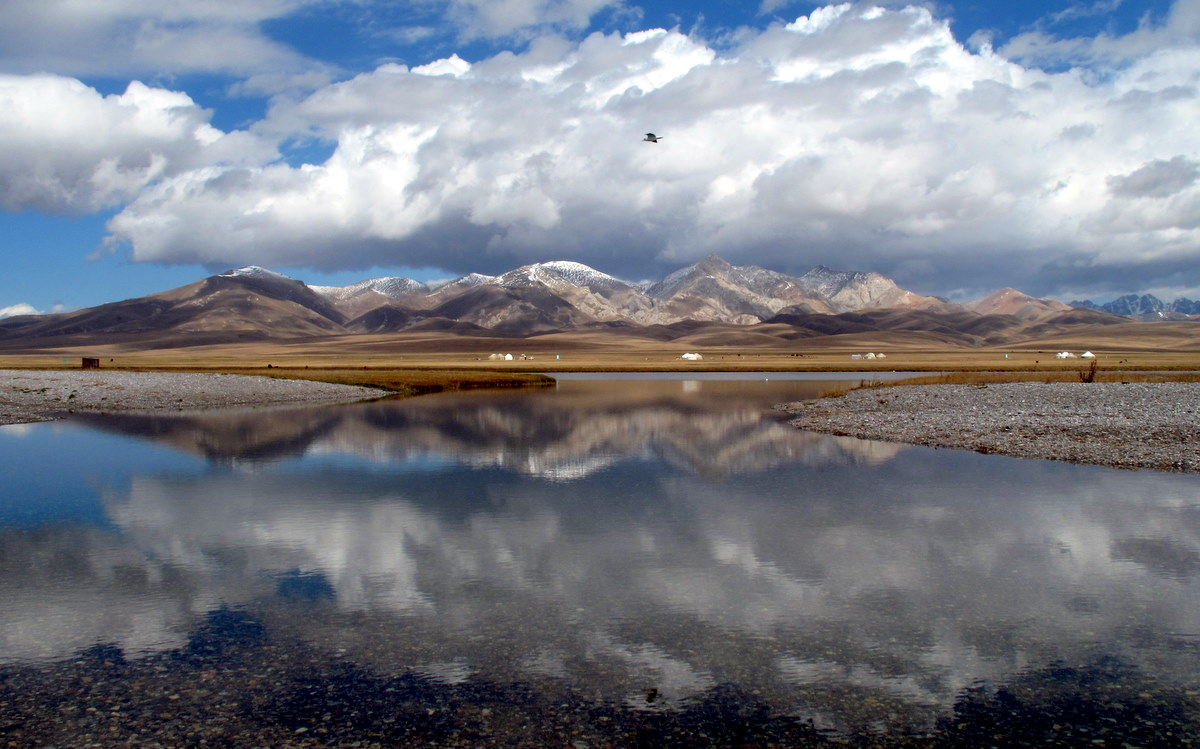
- Son Kol sector, Karatal-Japyryk Nature Reserve

- Location within Kyrgyzstan
- Location: Naryn Region, Kyrgyzstan
- Nearest city: Naryn
- Coordinates: 41.6237°N 75.391°E
- Area: 36,393 ha (89,930 acres)
- Established: 1994

The Karatal-Japyryk Nature Reserve (Kyrgyz: Каратал–Жапырык мамлекеттик коругу, Russian: Каратал-Жапырыкский государственный заповедник) is a nature reserve in Naryn Region of Kyrgyzstan. Established in 1994, it currently covers 36,393 hectares. It was established for the conservation of unique nature complexes, protection of rare and threatened species of flora and fauna of Central Tien-Shan, and maintain regional environmental balance.

The main section of the nature reserve is situated in the Ak-Talaa and Naryn districts, south of the lake Song-Köl. It covers the basins of the rivers Karatal and Japyryk, which are tributaries of the Kajyrty (Naryn basin). In 1998 sections of the lakes Song-Köl (3,400 ha land, 5,200 ha water) and Chatyr-Köl (3,200 ha land, 3,954 ha water) were added to the Karatal-Japyryk Nature Reserve.
