= At-Bashy (river) =

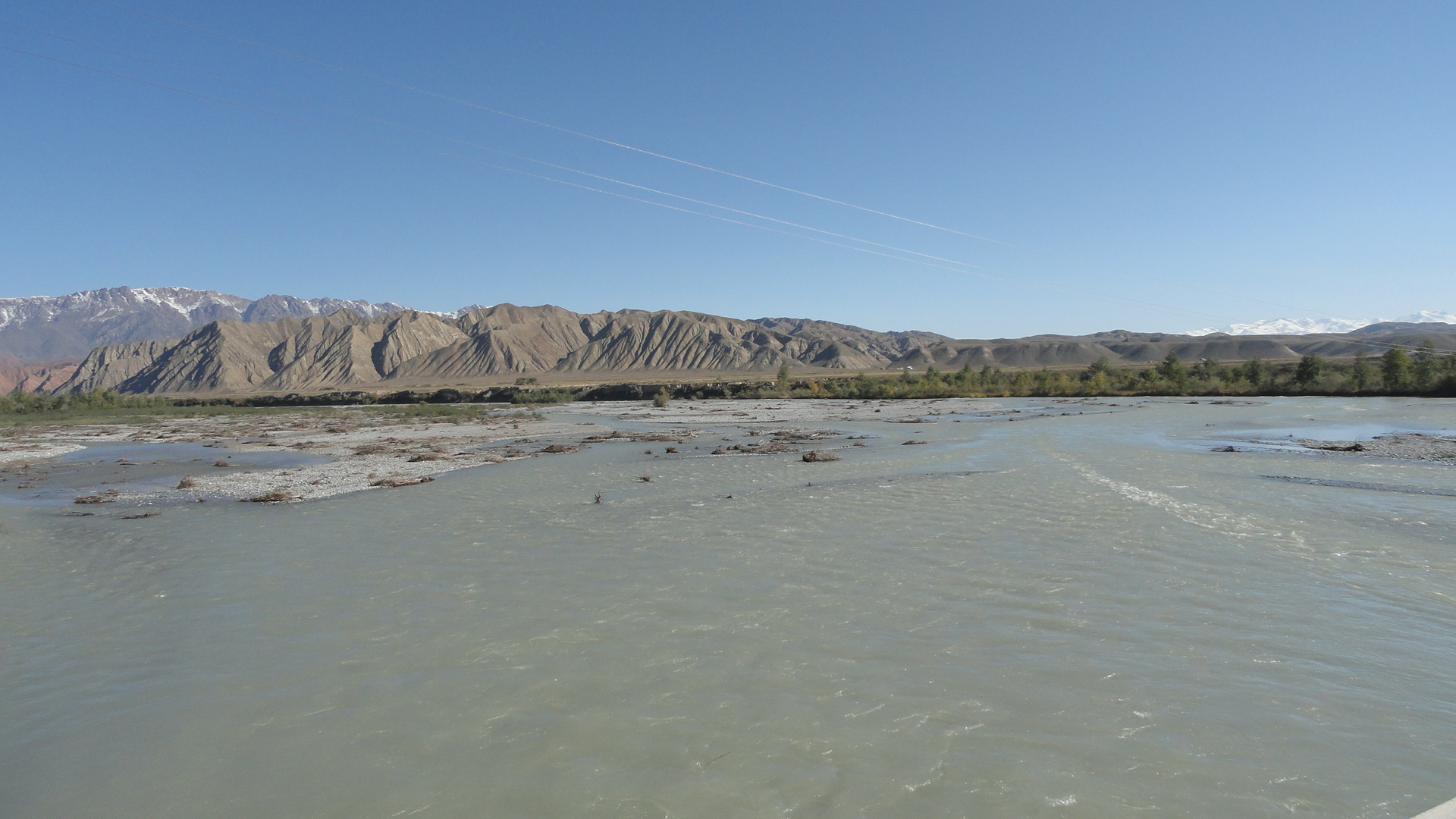

- Location within Kyrgyzstan
- Native name: Ат-Башы (Kyrgyz)

Location
- Country: Kyrgyzstan
- Region: Naryn Region
- District: At-Bashy District

Physical characteristics
- Source: confluence of Ulan and Jangy-Jer
  - coordinates: 41°19′15″N 76°40′00″E
  - elevation: 2,837 m (9,308 ft)
- Mouth: Naryn
  - coordinates: 41°22′20″N 75°35′55″E
  - elevation: 1,807 m (5,928 ft)
- Length: 180 km (110 mi)
- Basin size: 5,540 km^{2} (2,140 sq mi)

Basin features
- Progression: Naryn→ Syr Darya→ North Aral Sea

The At-Bashy (Kyrgyz: Ат-Башы) is a left tributary of the Naryn in Naryn Region of Kyrgyzstan. The river is formed at the north slope of Jangy-Jer Range by the confluence of the rivers Ulan and Jangy-Jer. It flows into the Naryn near Dostuk. It is 180 kilometres (110 mi) long, and has a drainage basin of 5,540 square kilometres (2,140 sq mi). Average altitude - 3,060 m, annual average flow rate - 33.1 m^{3}/s, and average specific discharge - 5.98 L/s•km^{2}. Settlements along the banks of the At-Bashy include At-Bashy, Bash-Kayyngdy, Birinchi May and Taldy-Suu.
