= Tash Rabat =

15th-century caravanserai in Kyrgyzstan

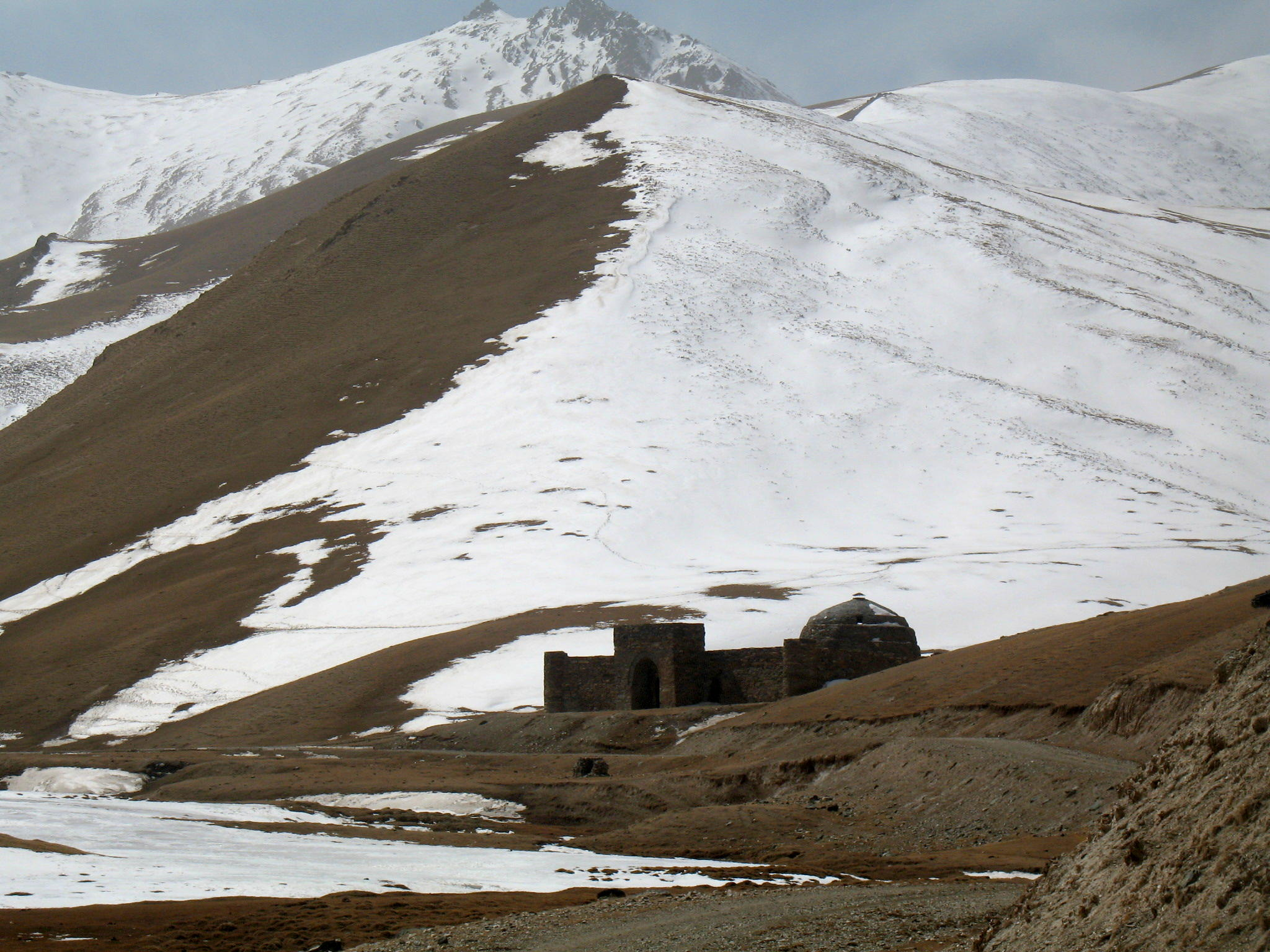
- Tash Rabat situated in the surrounding mountains

- Location within Kyrgyzstan Location within West and Central Asia Location within Asia
- 40.82315°N 75.288766°E
- Type: Caravanserai
- Location: Naryn Province, Kyrgyzstan

History
- Built: 10th, 11th or 15th century

Site notes
- Owner: Tursun Zhutabaeva (caretaker)

Tash Rabat ("stone lodging") is a well-preserved 10th- or 15th-century stone caravanserai in At-Bashy District, Naryn Province, Kyrgyzstan, located at an altitude of 3,200 metres (10,500 ft).

== Geography ==
Tash Rabat is located somewhat east of the main north-south highway. To the south are Lake Chatyr-Kul and Torugart Pass. To the north is Koshoy Korgon, a ruined fortress of uncertain date.

== Research ==
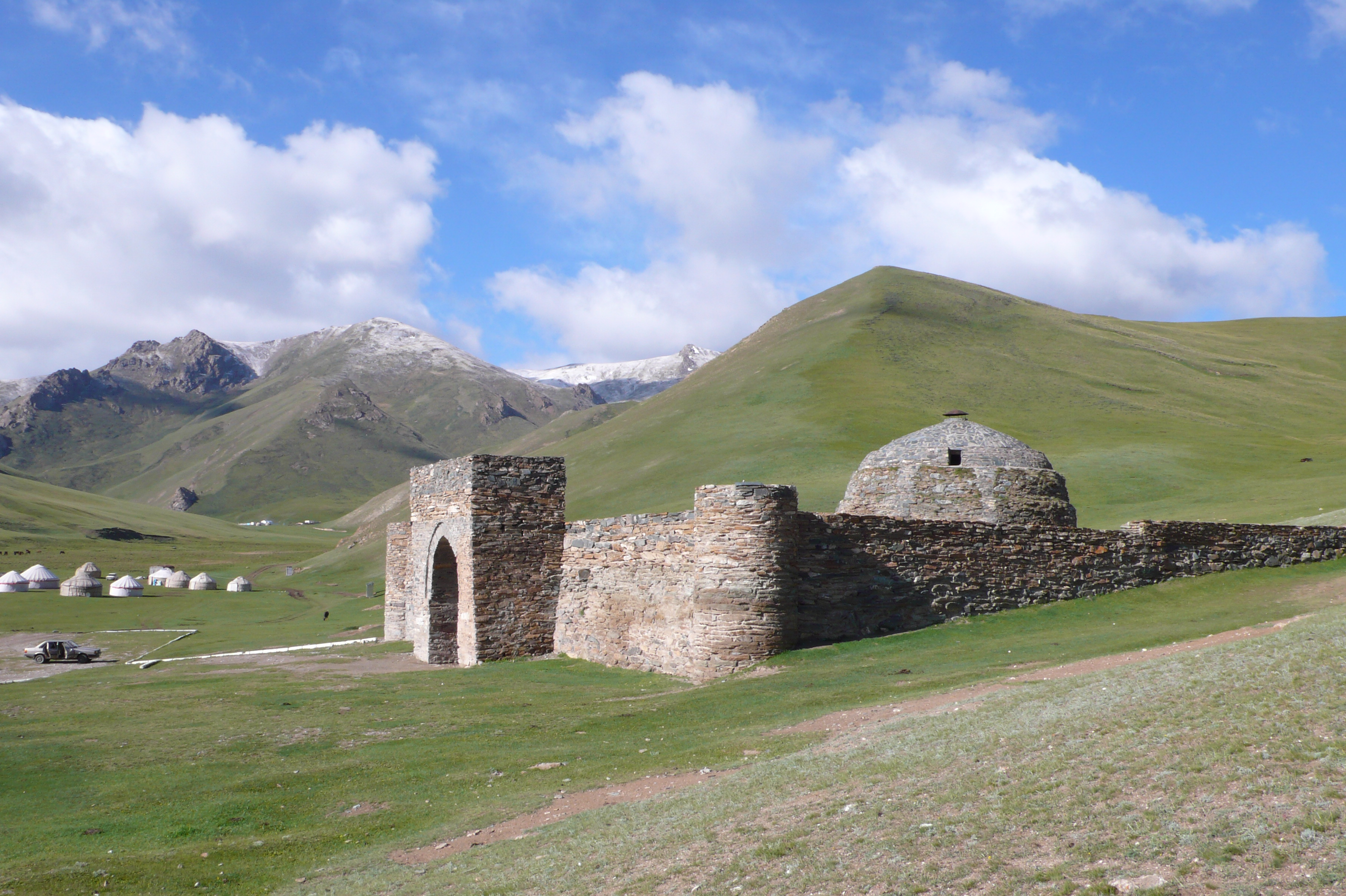
Tash Rabat

There has been some debate about whether Tash Rabat was originally built as a caravanserai or a temple. As early as 1888, Russian doctor and traveler Nicolay Lvovich Zeland suggested that the site was originally an East Syrian or Buddhist monastery.

Research undertaken at the end of the 1970s and beginning of the 1980s by the Institute of History of the Kyrgyz Academy of Sciences concluded that Tash Rabat was originally built as a Nestorian monastery in the 10th century, although no Christian artifacts were found during excavations. It was also studied as a Sufi khānaqāh. Later it was determined to be a Buddhist monastery as all inscriptions, artifacts and references were found to be Buddhist in nature. This was further supported by the fact that its inhabitants were Buddhist during the period of its construction.

== Architecture ==
The structure consists of 31 rooms, including chambers in the central hall. The rooms are square and topped with domes which have openings for light at the top; transition from a quadrangular frame to a dome is achieved using a squinch. Tash Rabat is completely made of rubble stone on clay mortar with gypsum mortar sealing joints. One of the furthest rooms also has a deep hole in the floor that resembles a well.

Tash Rabat now has a large corrugated roof and fence, and a large parking lot directly in front of it.
