= Cholpon Orozobekova =

Kyrgyz journalist

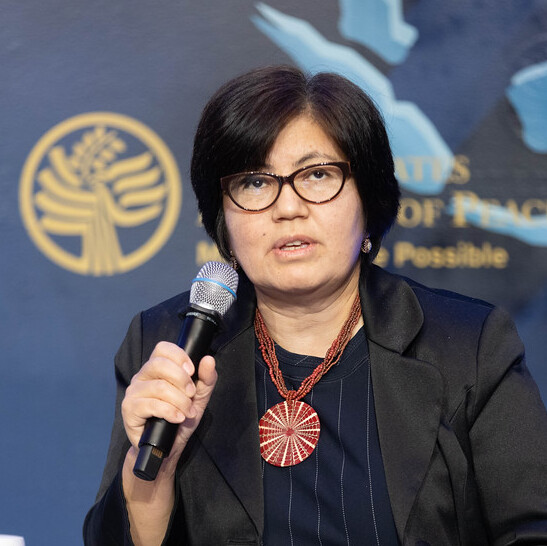
- Born: November 17, 1975 (age 50); At-Bashi District, Kyrgyzstan
- Occupation: Director of the Bulan Institute for Peace Innovations
- Spouse: Jengishbek Edigeev

Cholpon Orozobekova (Kyrgyz: Чолпон Орозобекова; born 17 November 1975 in At-Bashy District, Naryn Region, then Kyrgyz SSR) is a Geneva‑based conflict analyst and an expert on security issues, including counterterrorism, climate change and renewable energy. She is the founder and director of the Bulan Institute for Peace Innovations, a peacebuilding organisation based in Geneva. She speaks Kyrgyz, Russian, English and French.

== Biography ==
Cholpon Orozobekova was born on 17 November 1975 in the At‑Bashy district of the Naryn region of Kyrgyzstan, into a family of teachers.

She attended what was then called the Pogranichnik secondary school in the village of Pogranichnik, now known as Kazybek, after the dissident poet Kazybek Mambetimin‑uulu (1901–1936), who was murdered by the Stalinist regime for his verses against the Bolsheviks.

She graduated from the Faculty of Journalism at Kyrgyz State University, named after Ishenaly Arabayev.

She holds three master's degrees, all from Geneva‑based public universities:

- an MA in International Relations/Political Science from the Geneva Graduate Institute, awarded in 2017
- an MAS in International and European Security from the University of Geneva, awarded in 2014
- an Executive Master in International Negotiations and Policy‑Making from the Geneva Graduate Institute, awarded in 2013.

== Her current role ==
Currently, Cholpon Orozobekova works as a director of the Bulan Institute for Peace Innovations. She co-founded the institute in 2017.
The Bulan Institute was officially registered as a non-governmental organization in Geneva, Switzerland, on 18 May 2018.

The institute works on Sustainable Development Goals with the main focus on Central Asia. The Climate Change and Renewable Energy programme has been implementing projects to mitigate climate change in Central Asia and to accelerate the adoption of renewable energy resources.

Since 2024, the Bulan Institute has been implementing the Solar Energy Skills Development Project in Kyrgyzstan jointly with the Kyrgyz Technical University named after I. Razzakov.

== Private life ==
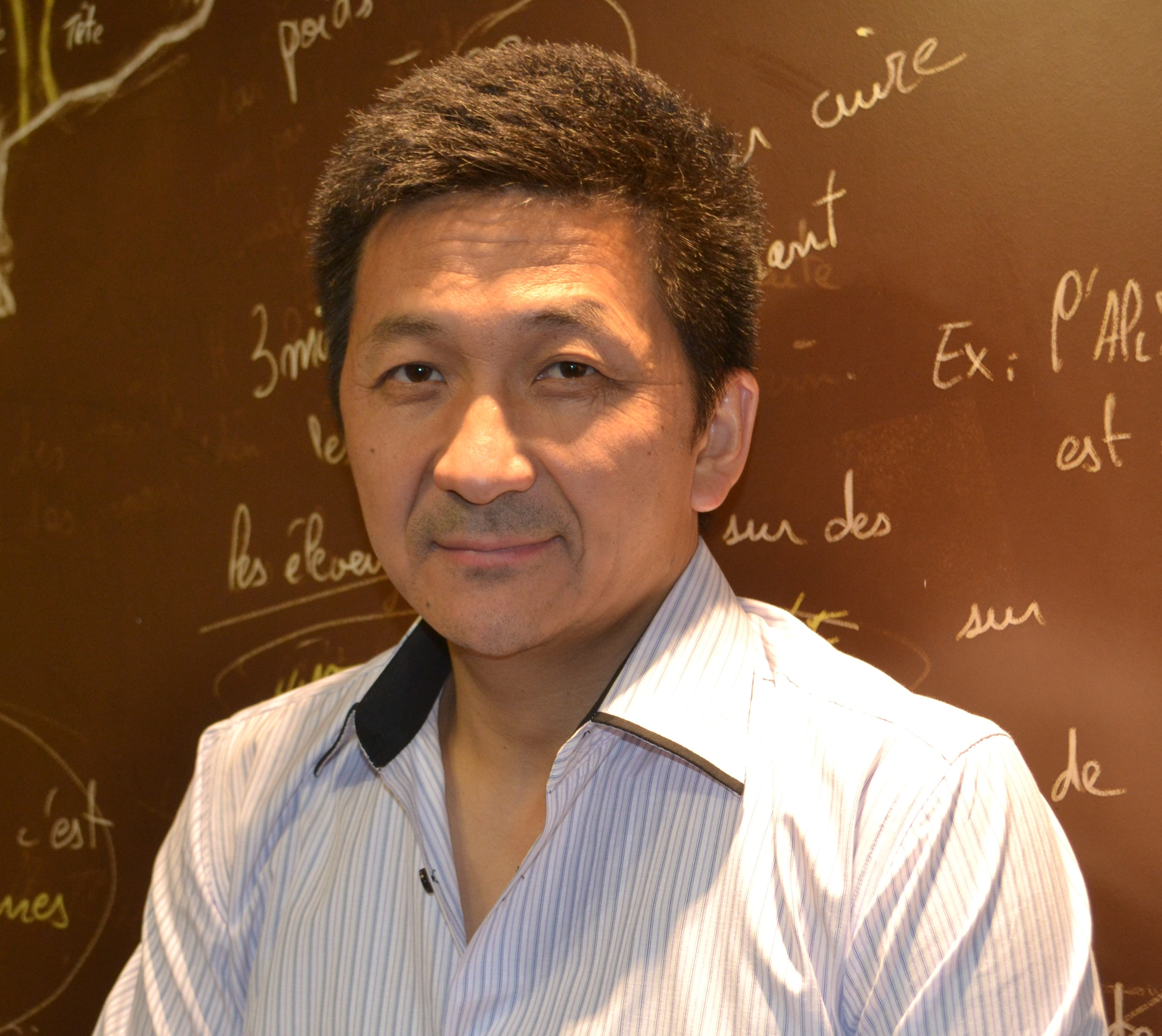
Jengishbek Edigeev, a Kyrgyz journalist. 27.5.2013.

Cholpon Orozobekova is married and has three daughters. Her husband is Kyrgyz journalist Jengishbek Edigeev (in Kyrgyz - Жеңишбек Эдигеев), who graduated the Faculty of Journalism at the Kyrgyz National University named after Jusup Balasagyn in Bishkek, Kyrgyzstan. He published a Kyrgyz-French dictionary (2015).

== References and web resources ==
- Akunov, Aalıbek. Kırgızstan egemendik doorunda (1991–2021) / Jooptuu red. prof. T.K.Çorotegin. – 2-bas, tol. j-a oŋd. – Bişkek: “Kalem” basması, 2021. – 1040 bet, jadıbal., süröt., kartalar. – ISBN 978-9967-9308-7-2 [In Kyrgyz. Akunov, Aalybek. Kyrgyzstan in the era of independence (1991–2021) / Editor-in-chief prof. T.K.Chorotegin. – 2nd ed., complete and corrected. – Bishkek" “Kalem” publishing house, 2021. – 1040 pages, tables, illustrations, maps.]
