= Kökkyya =

- Native name: Kyrgyz: Көккыя

Location
- Country: Kyrgyzstan
- Region: Naryn Region
- District: At-Bashy District

Physical characteristics
- Source: Kakshaal-Too Range
  - elevation: 3,514 m (11,529 ft)
- Mouth: Aksai River
  - coordinates: 40.884°N 76.61°E
- Length: 83 km (52 mi)
- Basin size: 1,050 km^{2} (410 sq mi)
- Discharge
  - average: 3.75 m^{3}/s (132 cu ft/s)

Basin features
- Progression: Aksai → Toshkan → Tarim
- Tributaries
  - left: Tuyuk-Khojent, Khojent
  - right: Aksay-Uuru, Tuyuk-Botomoynok, Karabel

Kökkyya (Kyrgyz: Көккыя) is a river in At-Bashy District, Naryn Region, Kyrgyzstan. It is a right tributary of the Aksai River and flows through the Aksai Valley. The river originates in the Kakshaal Too and is part of the Tarim Basin through the Aksai and Toshkan rivers.

== Geography ==
The Kökkyya is 83 km (52 mi) long and has a drainage basin of 1,050 km^{2} (410 sq mi). In its upper reaches, the valley alternates between narrow and broad sections, and in some places the river divides into several channels.

Near its source, at an elevation of 3,514 m (11,529 ft), lies Köl-Suu, which has an area of 4.5 km^{2} (1.7 sq mi).

== Hydrology ==
The river is fed mainly by snowmelt, glaciers, and springs. Its average annual discharge is 3.75 m^{3}/s (132 cu ft/s). Peak flows occur in July, while the lowest flows are observed in March. Water levels begin to decline in September and start rising again in May.

== Tributaries ==
Major tributaries include:

- Right tributaries: Aksay-Uuru (29 km), Tuyuk-Botomoynok (28 km), and Karabel (10 km);
- Left tributaries: Tuyuk-Khojent (13 km) and Khojent (11 km).
