= Koshoy Korgon =

- Кошой Коргон
- At-Bashy District; Near Kara-Suu in Kyrgyzstan
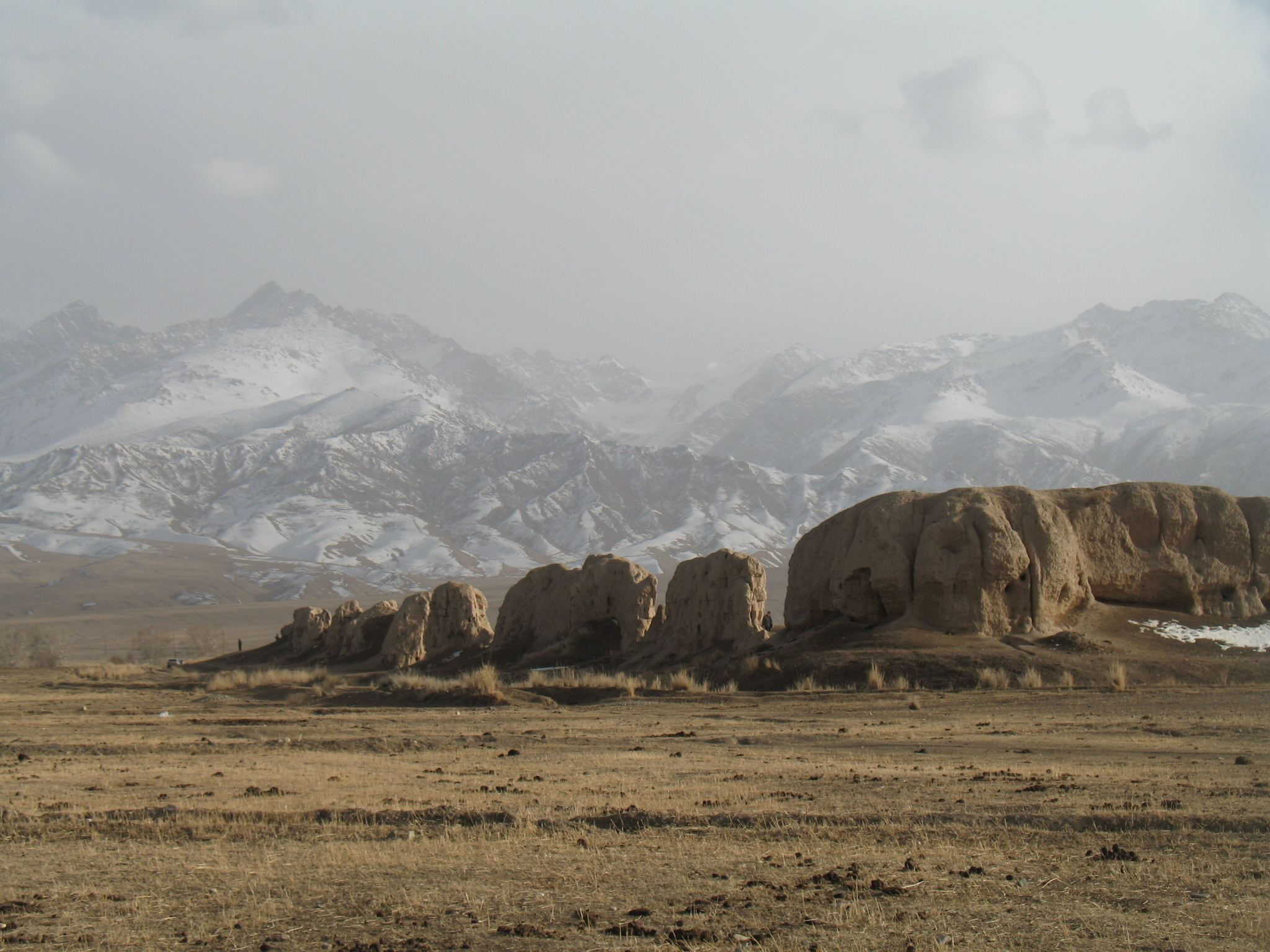
- Qoshoy Qorgon from the outside (northeast), looking south.

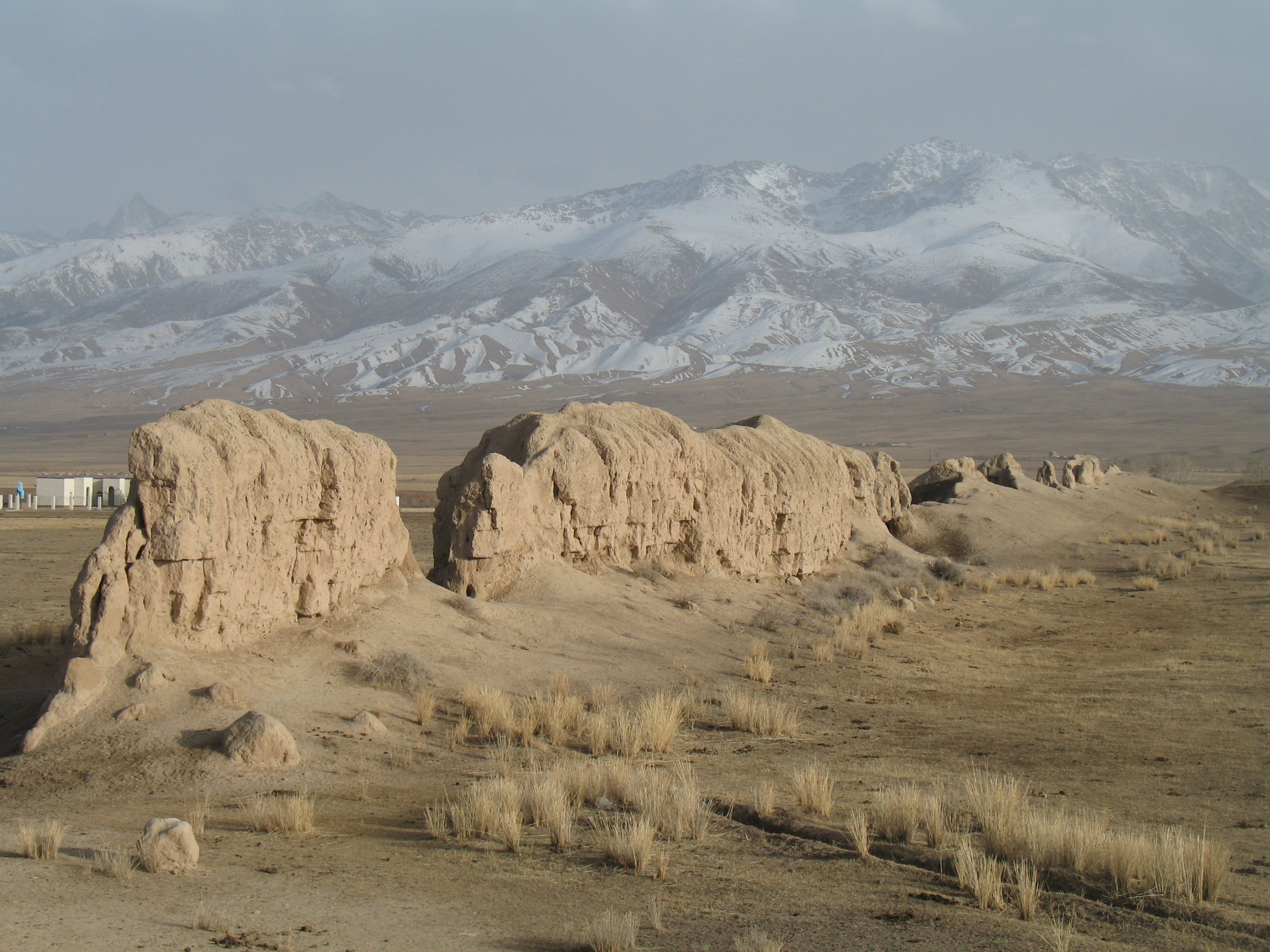
- Qoshoy Qorgon from the inner northern corner, looking south-east. The on-site museum is visible in the background.

Site information
- Type: Fortress
- Condition: Ruined

Location
- Coordinates: 41.1230°N 75.7004°E

Site history
- Materials: Mud

Koshoy Korgon or Qoshoy Qorgon (Kyrgyz: Кошой Коргон [qoʃoj qorʁón]) is a ruined fortress of uncertain date located in At-Bashy District, Kyrgyzstan. The structure, which consists of walls made of mud enclosing a large area and is identified as a korgon ("fortress", not to be confused with a kurgan), is immediately to the southeast of Kara-Suu village, and a little ways west of At-Bashy village. It is named after Qoshoy baatyr, one of Manas's generals, who is thought to have been a catalyst for its construction. There is an on-site museum for tourists that is rarely open.
