= At-Bashy Range =

Mountain range in Kyrgyzstan

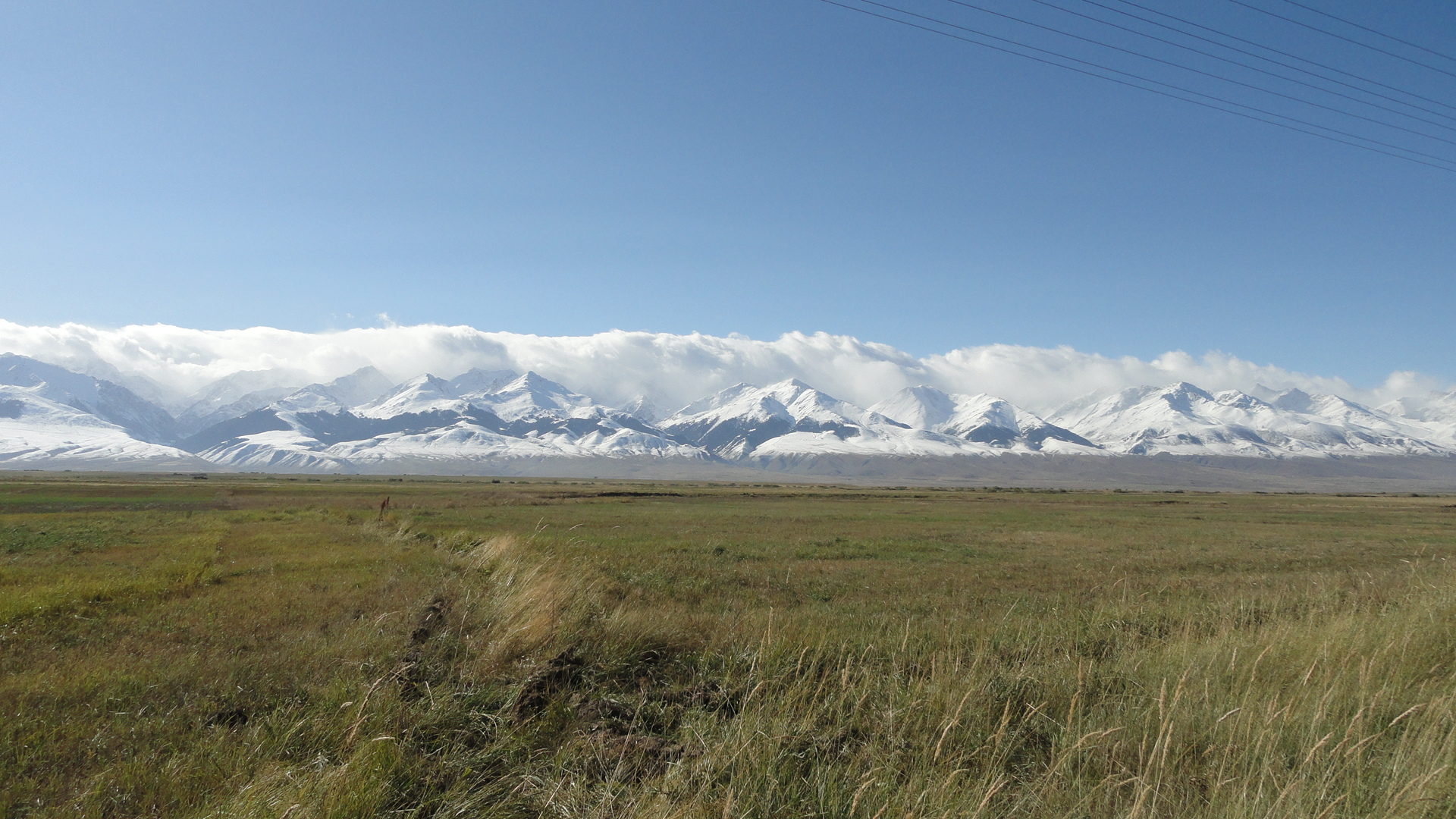
- At-Bashi Range

Highest point
- Elevation: 4,786 m (15,702 ft)
- Coordinates: 40°53′33″N 75°36′20″E

Dimensions
- Length: 140 km (87 mi) SW-NE
- Width: 30 km (19 mi) NW-SE

Naming
- Native name: Ат-Башы тоо кыркасы (Kyrgyz)

Geography
- Location within Kyrgyzstan
- Country: Kyrgyzstan
- Region: Naryn
- District: At-Bashy

Geology
- Formed by: limestone, schists
- Rock age: Paleozoic

The At-Bashy Range (Kyrgyz: Ат-Башы тоо кыркасы) is a mountain range in the southern part of the Inner Tian Shan in Kyrgyzstan. It is located in At-Bashy District of Naryn Region. The range is 140 km (87 mi) long and up to 30 km (19 mi) wide. Its average elevation is about 4,280 m (14,040 ft), and its highest point reaches 4,786 m (15,702 ft).

== Geography ==
The highest part of the At-Bashy Range lies in its central section, where elevations exceed 4,500 m (14,800 ft). The range becomes progressively lower toward both the western and eastern ends, where elevations are generally below 4,000 m (13,000 ft).

=== Relief and geology ===
The central crest of the range rises above the snow line. Its slopes are dissected by short, deep transverse gorges, and glaciers are common in the higher parts of the range. The At-Bashy Range is composed mainly of limestone and schist of Paleozoic age.

=== Vegetation ===
The vegetation and landscapes vary considerably with elevation and slope exposure. On the southern slopes, alpine and subalpine landscapes occur at elevations of about 3,600–3,900 m (11,800–12,800 ft), while alpine tundra occupies elevations of approximately 3,900–4,300 m (12,800–14,100 ft).

On the northern slopes, mountain steppe occurs at 2,400–2,700 m (7,900–8,900 ft), followed by mountain meadows at 2,700–3,000 m (8,900–9,800 ft), subalpine and alpine vegetation at 3,400–3,600 m (11,200–11,800 ft), and tundra at about 3,800–4,000 m (12,500–13,100 ft). The western slopes are characterized by a combination of stony terrain, steppe, subalpine vegetation, and tundra.

== Hydrology ==
Several rivers originate on the southern slopes of the At-Bashy Range and form the Aksay River, a right tributary of the Kakshaal River (Toshkan River). They include the Keng-Suu, Kosh Kara-Tash, Muzdabas, Tuyuk Bogoshtu, Jol Bogoshtu, Kashka-Suu, and Tuyz Ashuu rivers.

The Kara-Koyun River, a left tributary of the At-Bashy River, rises on the northern slopes of the range.
