= Naryn District =

Coordinates: 41°26′N 76°00′E

Naryn District Нарын району
- District
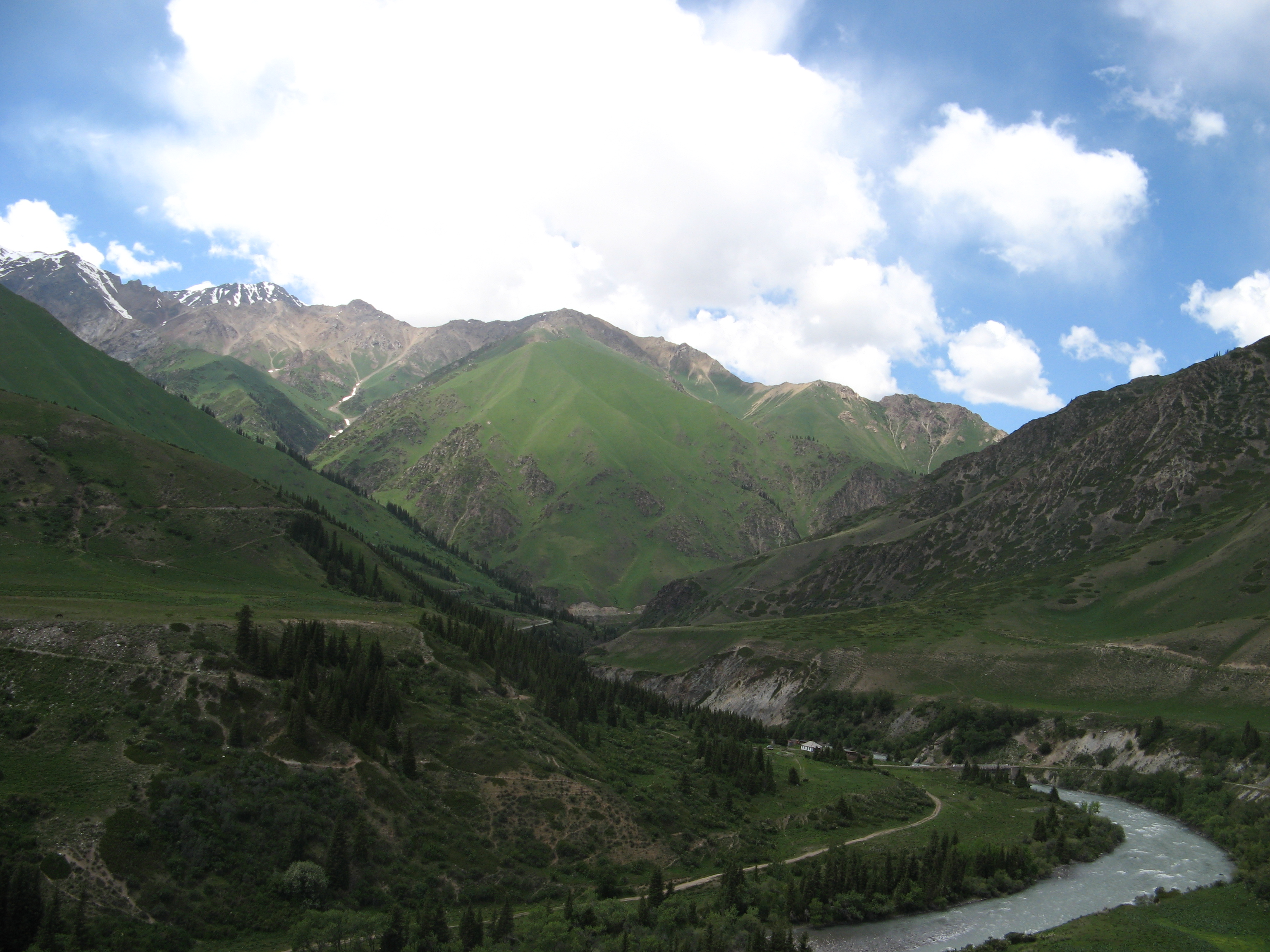
- Countryside in Naryn District near Naryn

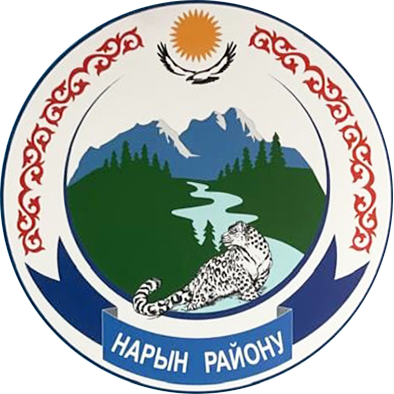
- Coat of arms

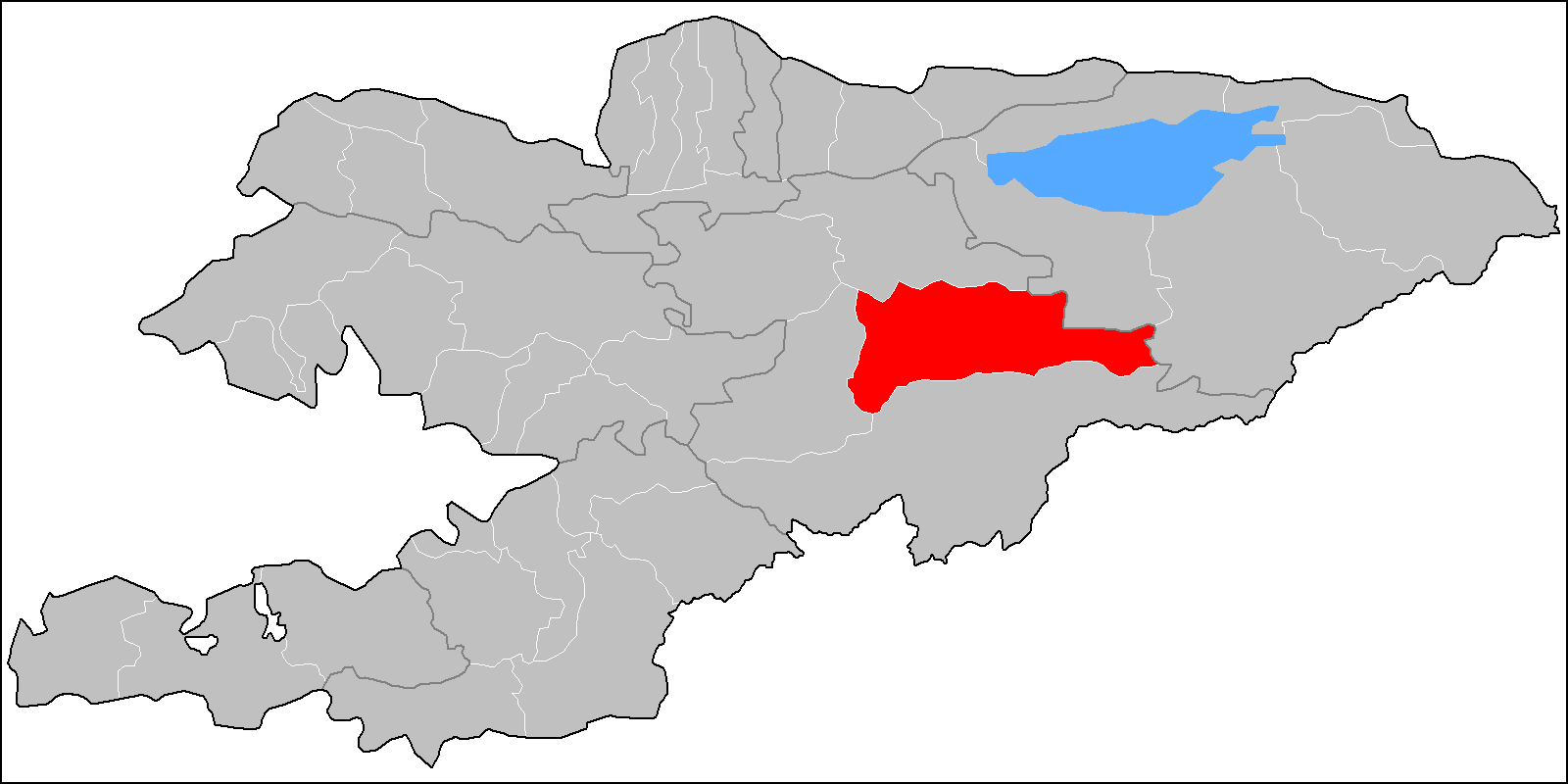
- Country: Kyrgyzstan
- Region: Naryn Region
- Seat: Naryn

Area
  - Total: 10,502 km^{2} (4,055 sq mi)

Population (2021)
  - Total: 49,955
  - Density: 4.7567/km^{2} (12.320/sq mi)
- Time zone: UTC+6 (KGT)
- Villages: 39
- Rural Communities: 15

Naryn District (Kyrgyz: Нарын району, romanized: Naryn rayonu, before 2004: Tyanshan District) is a district of Naryn Region in central-southern Kyrgyzstan. The administrative seat lies at the city of Naryn, which is not part of the district. Naryn District was established in its borders in 1930. It borders At-Bashy District to the south, Ak-Talaa District to the west, Kochkor District to the north, Tong District to the north-east, Jeti-Ögüz District to the east, and Lake Song Köl to the north-west. Its area is 10,502 km^{2} (4,055 sq mi), and its resident population was 49,955 in 2021.

The district is characterized by the scenic Tian Shan Mountains, alpine pastures and Lake Song Köl which during summer months attracts large herds of sheep and horses with their herders and their yurts.

== Economy ==
The economy of Naryn oblast is dominated by animal herding (sheep, horses, yaks), with wool and meat as the main products. Mining of various minerals developed during the Soviet era has largely been abandoned as uneconomical. Today the area is considered to be the poorest region in the country.

== Demographics ==
Historical populations in Naryn District
Year	Pop.	±%
1970	30,487	—
1979	34,089	+11.8%
1989	36,863	+8.1%
1999	40,628	+10.2%
2009	44,080	+8.5%
2021	49,955	+13.3%
Note: resident population; Sources:

According to the 2009 Census, the ethnic composition (de jure population) of the Naryn District was 99.8% Kyrgyz and 0.2% other groups.

== Populated places ==
In total, Naryn District includes 39 settlements in 15 rural communities (ayyl aymagy). The rural communities and settlements in the Naryn District are:

1. Ak-Kuduk (seat: Segizinchi Mart; incl. Ak-Kuduk and Shoro)
2. Chet-Nura (seat: Orto-Nura; incl. Ak-Bulung, Ak-Kyya, Iyri-Suu, Orto-Saz, Örük-Tam (part), Chet-Nura and Tösh-Bulak)
3. Döbölü (seat: Döbölü; incl. Alysh and Kengesh)
4. Dostuk (seat: Dostuk)
5. Emgekchil (seat: Emgekchil)
6. Emgek-Talaa (seat: Ak-Talaa; incl. Tegerek and Emgek-Talaa)
7. Esenaly Dayrakunov (seat: Jerge-Tal; incl. Jalgyz-Terek and Kyzyl-Jyldyz)
8. Jan-Bulak (seat: Jan-Bulak)
9. Kara-Kujur (seat: Lakol; incl. Jer-Köchkü)
10. Kazan-Kuygan (seat: Kazan-Kuygan; incl. Kara-Üngkür)
11. Ming-Bulak (seat: Kuybyshev; incl. Ming-Bulak and Örnök)
12. On-Archa (seat: Echki-Bashy; incl. Ottuk)
13. Ortok (seat: Tash-Bashat, incl. Kayyngdy, Örük-Tam, Eki-Naryn and Tamdy-Suu)
14. Sary-Oy (seat: Jylan-Aryk; incl. Sary-Oy)
15. Uchkun (seat: Kulanak; incl. Uchkun)
Settlements of the Naryn District.
Abbreviations: ON - Orto-Nura, CN - Chet-Nura
