= Bash-Kayyngdy =

Bash-Kayyngdy Баш-Кайыңды
- Location within Kyrgyzstan
- Coordinates: 41°9′0″N 75°54′0″E
- Country: Kyrgyzstan
- Region: Naryn
- District: At-Bashy
- Elevation: 2,160 m (7,090 ft)

Population (2021)
  - Total: 5,202
- Time zone: UTC+6

Bash-Kayyngdy (Kyrgyz: Баш-Кайыңды) is a village in Naryn Region of Kyrgyzstan. It is part of the At-Bashy District. Its population was 5,202 in 2021.

The village of Birdik is 6 km (4 mi) to the northeast, and At-Bashy is 8 km (5 mi) to the west.

== Population ==
Historical population
Year	Pop.	±% p.a.
2009	4,078	—
2021	5,202	+2.05%
Note: resident population; Sources:
