= Emgekchil =

Emgekchil Эмгекчил
- Location within Kyrgyzstan
- Coordinates: 41°33′19″N 75°58′18″E
- Country: Kyrgyzstan
- Region: Naryn Region
- District: Naryn District
- Elevation: 2,382 m (7,815 ft)

Population (2021)
  - Total: 3,353
- Time zone: UTC+6

Emgekchil (Kyrgyz: Эмгекчил) is a settlement in the Naryn Region of Kyrgyzstan. It is part of the Naryn District. The population of the settlement was 3,353 in 2021.

== Population ==
Historical population
Year	Pop.	±% p.a.
2009	2,930	—
2021	3,353	+1.13%
Note: resident population; Sources:
