= Jalgyz-Terek =

Jalgyz-Terek Жалгыз-Терек
- Location within Kyrgyzstan
- Coordinates: 41°27′36″N 75°46′48″E
- Country: Kyrgyzstan
- Region: Naryn Region
- District: Naryn District

Population (2021)
  - Total: 1,245

Jalgyz-Terek (Kyrgyz: Жалгыз-Терек) is a village in the Naryn Region of Kyrgyzstan. Its population was 1,245 in 2021.
