= Emgek-Talaa =

Emgek-Talaa Эмгек-Талаа
- Location within Kyrgyzstan
- Coordinates: 41°23′24″N 75°36′0″E
- Country: Kyrgyzstan
- Region: Naryn Region
- District: Naryn District

Population (2021)
  - Total: 1,866

Emgek-Talaa is a village in the Naryn Region of Kyrgyzstan. It is part of the Naryn District. Its population was 1,866 in 2021.
