= Kulanak =

Kulanak Куланак
- Location within Kyrgyzstan
- Coordinates: 41°21′N 75°30′E
- Country: Kyrgyzstan
- Region: Naryn Region
- District: Naryn District

Population (2021)
  - Total: 3,544

Kulanak (Kyrgyz: Куланак) is a village in the Naryn District, Naryn Region of Kyrgyzstan. Its population was 3,544 in 2021.
