= Ming-Bulak, Naryn =

Ming-Bulak Миң-Булак
- Location within Kyrgyzstan
- Coordinates: 41°28′53″N 75°51′14″E
- Country: Kyrgyzstan
- Region: Naryn Region
- District: Naryn District
- Elevation: 2,017 m (6,617 ft)

Population (2021)
  - Total: 1,438
- Time zone: UTC+6

Ming-Bulak (Kyrgyz: Миң-Булак) is a settlement in the Naryn Region of Kyrgyzstan. It is part of the Naryn District. Its population was 1,438 in 2021.

== Population ==
Historical population
Year	Pop.	±% p.a.
2009	1,130	—
2021	1,438	+2.03%
Note: resident population; Sources:
