= Shoro =

Shoro Шоро
- Location within Kyrgyzstan
- Coordinates: 41°28′48″N 75°28′48″E
- Country: Kyrgyzstan
- Region: Naryn Region
- District: Naryn District

Population (2021)
  - Total: 618

Shoro (Kyrgyz: Шоро) is a village in the Naryn District, Naryn Region of Kyrgyzstan. Its population was 618 in 2021.
