= Ak-Jar, At-Bashy =

Ak-Jar Ак-Жар
- Location within Kyrgyzstan
- Coordinates: 41°10′20″N 75°47′10″E
- Country: Kyrgyzstan
- Region: Naryn
- District: At-Bashy

Population (2021)
  - Total: 5,559
- Time zone: UTC+6

Ak-Jar (Kyrgyz: Ак-Жар) is a village in Naryn Region of Kyrgyzstan. It is part of the At-Bashy District. Its population was 5,559 in 2021.

== Population ==
Historical population
Year	Pop.	±% p.a.
2009	3,208	—
2021	5,559	+4.69%
Note: resident population; Sources:
