= Uchkun =

Uchkun Учкун
- Location within Kyrgyzstan
- Coordinates: 41°22′12″N 75°21′36″E
- Country: Kyrgyzstan
- Region: Naryn Region
- District: Naryn District

Population (2021)
  - Total: 3,000

Uchkun is a village in Naryn Region of Kyrgyzstan. Its population was 3,000 in 2021.
