= Dostuk =

Dostuk may refer to

- Dostuk, Suzak District, a village in the Jalal-Abad Region, Kyrgyzstan
- Dostuk, Naryn, a village in the Naryn Region, Kyrgyzstan

== See also ==
- Dostyk, a small town in the Jetisu Region, Kazakhstan
