= Köl-Suu =

Alpine lake in At-Bashy, Naryn, Kyrgyzstan

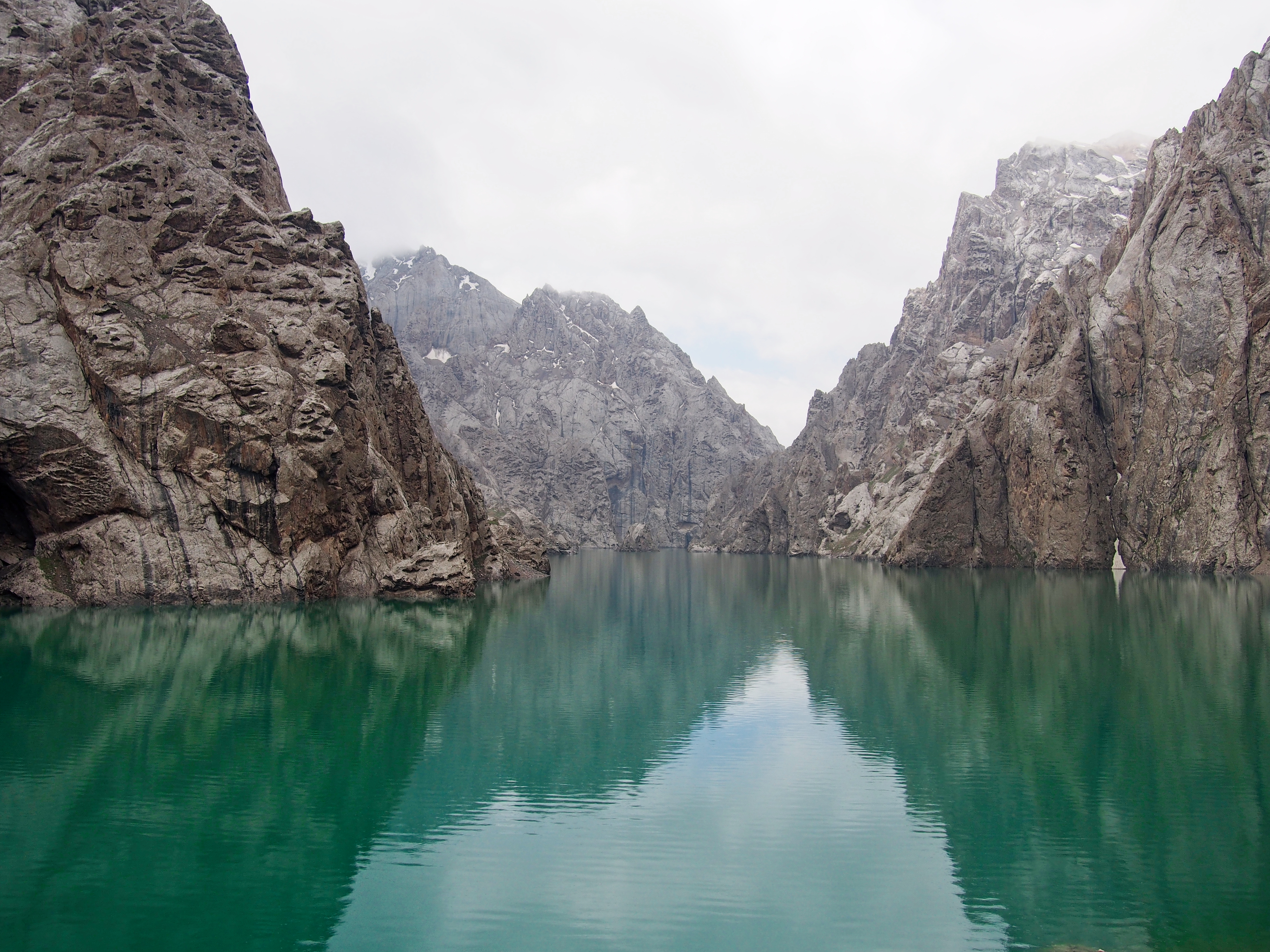

- Location within Kyrgyzstan Location within Asia
- Coordinates: 40°38′20″N 76°24′20″E
- Primary inflows: Kurumduk
- Primary outflows: Kurumduk
- Basin countries: Kyrgyzstan
- Max. length: 5 km (3.1 mi)
- Surface area: 4.5 km^{2} (1.7 sq mi)
- Surface elevation: 3,514 m (11,529 ft)

Köl-Suu (Kyrgyz: Көл-Суу, also Көлсуу) is an alpine lake in At-Bashy District of Naryn Region of southeastern Kyrgyzstan. It is located at 3514 m elevation in the Kakshaal Too mountain range, central Tian Shan. It is fed and drained by the river Kurumduk, a left tributary of the Kökkyya, which is a right tributary of the Kakshaal. It is 5 km long, and its area is 4.5 km^{2} (1.7 sq mi).

The river draining the lake starts from underground location and the water gushes out between the soil and rocks below the lake. The lake may also sometimes get totally empty as happened in 2019 making it similar to the Merzbacher lake that also resides in Kyrgyzstan.
