= Kök-Aygyr =

Kök-Aygyr Көк-Айгыр
- Location within Kyrgyzstan
- Coordinates: 40°43′12″N 75°36′36″E
- Country: Kyrgyzstan
- Region: Naryn Region
- Elevation: 3,551 m (11,650 ft)
- Time zone: UTC+6

Kök-Aygyr (Kyrgyz: Көк-Айгыр) is a settlement in Naryn Region of Kyrgyzstan. It is situated in the valley east of lake Chatyr-Kul.
