= Tegerek, Naryn =

Tegerek Тегерек
- Location within Kyrgyzstan
- Coordinates: 41°30′0″N 75°36′36″E
- Country: Kyrgyzstan
- Region: Naryn Region
- District: Naryn District

Population (2021)
  - Total: 129

Tegerek (Kyrgyz: Тегерек) is a village in the Naryn District, Naryn Region of Kyrgyzstan. Its population was 129 in 2021.
