= Ak-Bulung =

Ak-Bulung may refer to the following places in Kyrgyzstan:

- Ak-Bulung, Ak-Suu, a village in the Ak-Suu District of Issyk-Kul Region
- Ak-Bulung, Tüp, a village in the Tüp District of Issyk-Kul Region
- Ak-Bulung, Naryn, a village in the Naryn District of Naryn Region
