= Ak-Kuduk =

Ak-Kuduk Ак-Кудук
- Location within Kyrgyzstan
- Coordinates: 41°24′N 75°24′E
- Country: Kyrgyzstan
- Region: Naryn Region
- District: Naryn District

Population (2021)
  - Total: 718

Ak-Kuduk (Kyrgyz: Ак-Кудук) is a village in the Naryn District, Naryn Region of Kyrgyzstan. Its population was 718 in 2021.

It is located in the zone of expected II-hazard category earthquakes with a possible score of 5-7 units.
