= At-Bashy =

At-Bashy Ат-Башы
- Location within Kyrgyzstan
- Coordinates: 41°10′12″N 75°48′0″E
- Country: Kyrgyzstan
- Region: Naryn Region
- District: At-Bashy District

Population (2021)
  - Total: 14,655

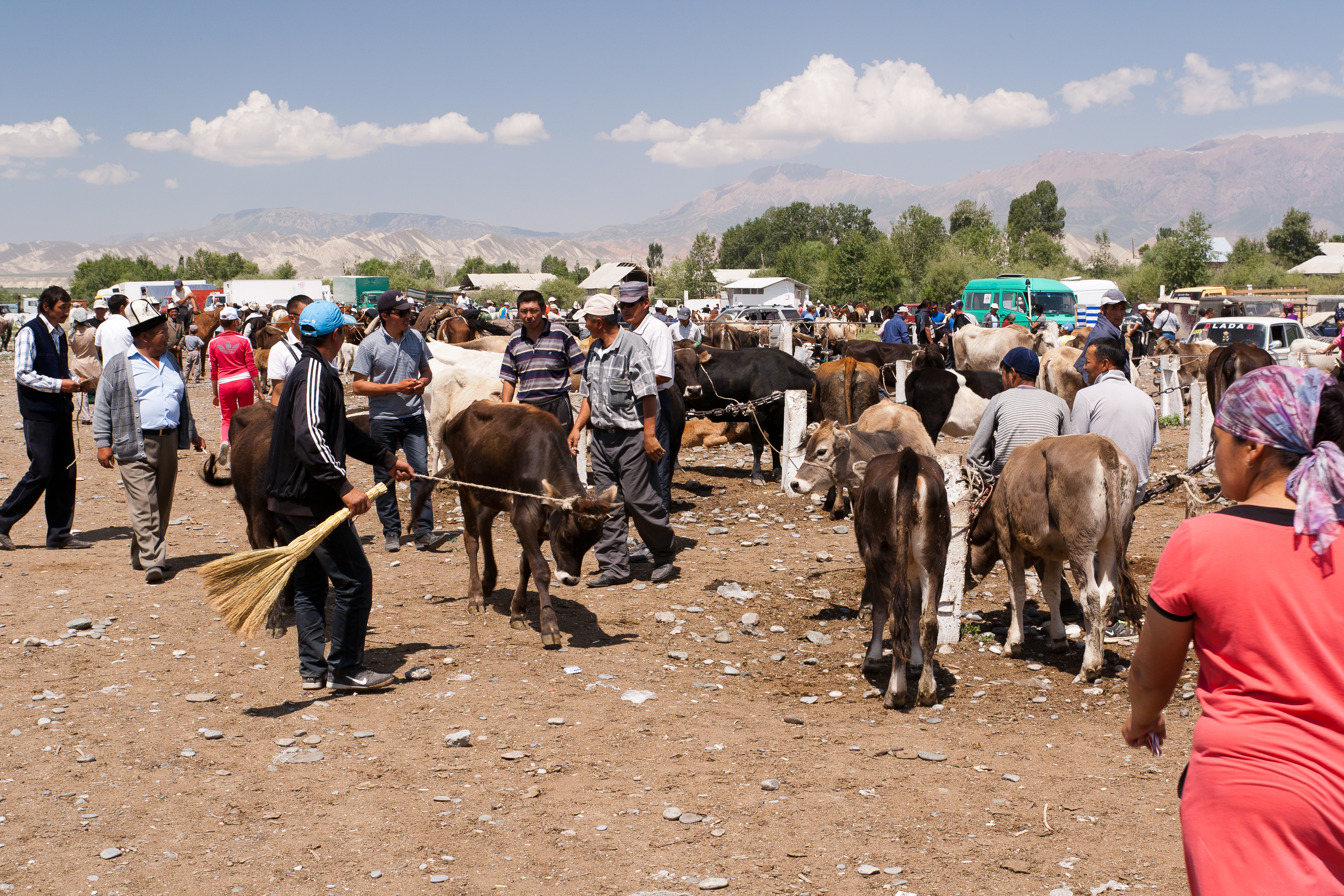
Livestock market in At-Bashy

At-Bashy (Kyrgyz: Ат-Башы) is a village in the Naryn Region of Kyrgyzstan, about 35km southwest of Naryn on the main highway to the Torugart Pass. It is the administrative seat of At-Bashy District. The At-Bashy Range to the south extends to Lake Chatyr-Kul. The river At-Bashy comes in from the east and then runs northwest through a gorge in the Baybiche-Too range to join the Naryn near Dostuk. It is the last considerable settlement before the Chinese border. The highway, built in 1906, runs southwest between the Baybiche-Too and At-Bashy ranges before turning south and then east to reach the pass. Its population was 14,655 in 2021. At-Bashy is also known for the white honey collected from its highlands, based on the esparcet honey plants.

== Population ==
Historical population
Year	Pop.	±% p.a.
2009	10,764	—
2021	14,655	+2.60%
Note: resident population; Sources:
