= Echki-Bashy =

Echki-Bashy Эчки-Башы
- Location within Kyrgyzstan
- Coordinates: 41°34′N 75°54′E
- Country: Kyrgyzstan
- Region: Naryn Region
- District: Naryn District

Population (2021)
  - Total: 1,885

Echki-Bashy (Kyrgyz: Эчки-Башы) is a village in the Naryn District, Naryn Region of Kyrgyzstan. Its population was 1,885 in 2021.
