= Jan-Bulak =

Jan-Bulak Жан-Булак
- Location within Kyrgyzstan
- Coordinates: 41°25′48″N 75°43′48″E
- Country: Kyrgyzstan
- Region: Naryn Region
- District: Naryn District

Population (2021)
  - Total: 2,527

Jan-Bulak (Kyrgyz: Жан-Булак) is a village in the Naryn District, Naryn Region of Kyrgyzstan. Its population was 2,527 in 2021.
