= Acha-Kayyngdy =

Acha-Kayyngdy Ача-Кайыңды
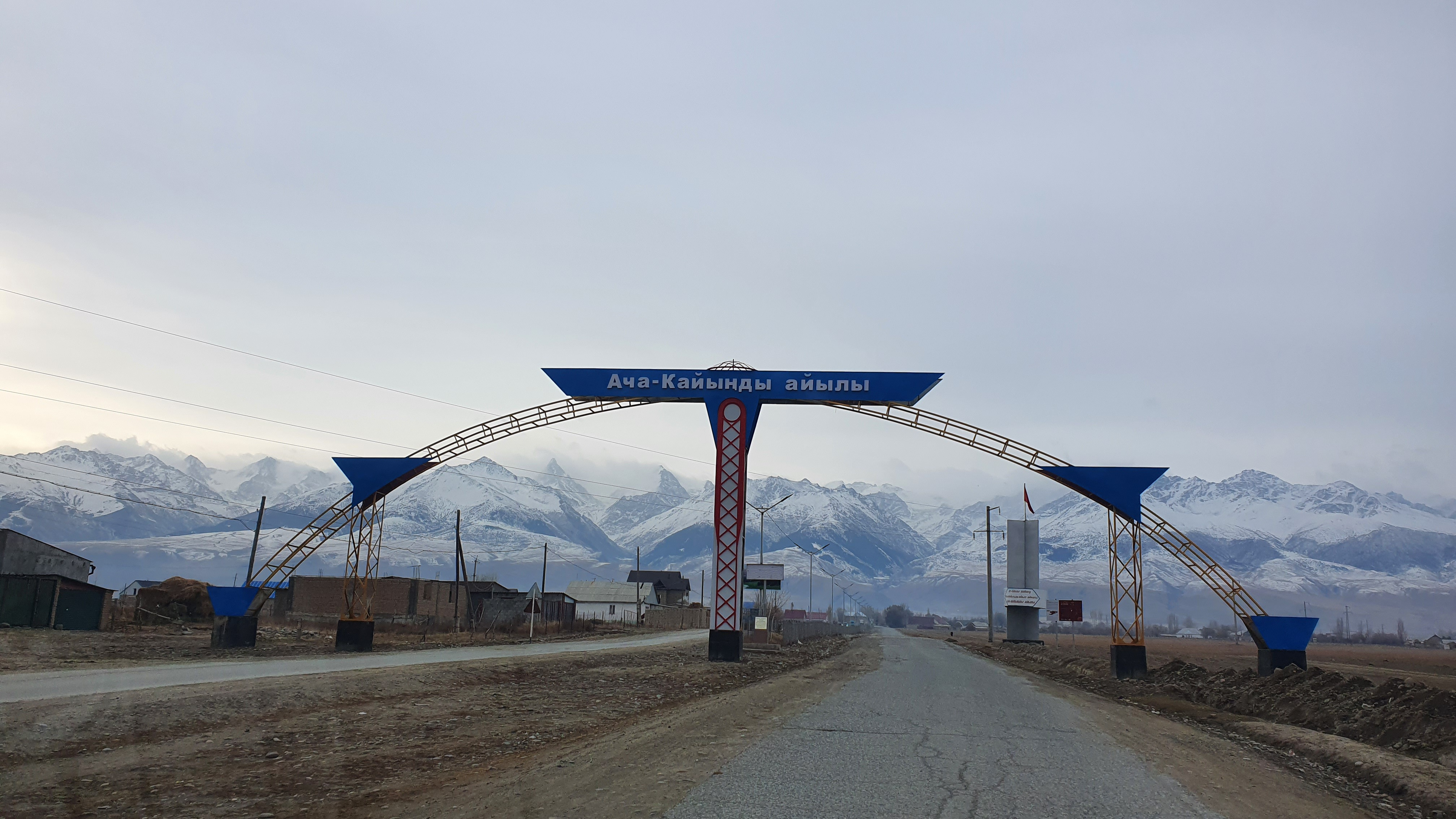

- Location within Kyrgyzstan
- Coordinates: 41°08′30″N 75°48′40″E
- Country: Kyrgyzstan
- Region: Naryn
- District: At-Bashy

Population (2021)
  - Total: 5,181
- Time zone: UTC+6

Acha-Kayyngdy (Kyrgyz: Ача-Кайыңды, formerly Oy-Tersken) is a village in Naryn Region of Kyrgyzstan. It is part of the At-Bashy District. Its population was 5,181 in 2021.

== Population ==
Historical population
| Year | Pop. | ±% p.a. |
|---|---|---|
| 2009 | 3,712 | — |
| 2021 | 5,181 | +2.82% |
Note: resident population; Sources:
