= Kara-Bulung =

Kara-Bulung Кара-Булуң
- Location within Kyrgyzstan
- Coordinates: 41°05′43″N 75°35′19″E
- Country: Kyrgyzstan
- Region: Naryn Region
- District: At-Bashy District
- Elevation: 2,160 m (7,090 ft)

Population (2021)
  - Total: 1,917
- Time zone: UTC+6

Kara-Bulung (Kyrgyz: Кара-Булуң) is a village in At-Bashy District of Naryn Region of Kyrgyzstan. Its population was 1,917 in 2021. European route E125 passes through the village.
