= Kazan-Kuygan =

Village in central Kyrgyzstan

Kazan-Kuygan Казан-Куйган
- Village
- Location within Kyrgyzstan
- Coordinates: 41°38′N 75°50′E
- Country: Kyrgyzstan
- Region: Naryn Region
- District: Naryn District
- Rural Community: Kazan-Kuygan
- First settled: 1915
- Elevation: 2,241 m (7,352 ft)

Population (2021)
  - Total: 1,182
- Time zone: UTC+6 (KGT)

Kazan-Kuygan (Kyrgyz: Казан-Куйган) is a village of Naryn District, Naryn Region in central Kyrgyzstan. Its population was 1,182 in 2021. Kazan-Kuygan is located along highway ЭМ-11 and about 35 km north of Naryn. Kazan-Kuygan lies across directly across the highway from the neighboring village of Ottuk.

Kazan-Kuygan is the administrative seat for the Kazan-Kuygan rural community (ayyl aymagy), which includes Kazan-Kuygan and the nearby village of Kara-Üngkür.

Kazan-Kuygan has a clinic, a culture club, a kindergarten, a library, a mosque, a school, and a village government building. A lyceum used to operate in Kazan-Kuygan, but it has since been moved to the nearby city of Naryn.

== Population ==
Historical population
| Year | Pop. | ±% p.a. |
|---|---|---|
| 2009 | 1,033 | — |
| 2021 | 1,182 | +1.13% |
Note: resident population; Sources:
