= Segizinchi Mart =

Segizinchi Mart Сегизинчи Март
- Location within Kyrgyzstan
- Coordinates: 41°27′N 75°24′E
- Country: Kyrgyzstan
- Region: Naryn Region
- District: Naryn District

Population (2021)
  - Total: 2,655

Segizinchi Mart (Kyrgyz: Сегизинчи Март, Russian: Восьмое Марта - Vosmoye Marta, both meaning "8 March") is a town in the Naryn District, Naryn Region of Kyrgyzstan. Its population was 2,655 in 2021.
