= Kyzyl-Tuu, Naryn =

Kyzyl-Tuu
- Location within Kyrgyzstan
- Coordinates: 41°3′30″N 75°33′10″E
- Country: Kyrgyzstan
- Region: Naryn Region
- District: At-Bashy District

Population (2021)
  - Total: 2,291
- Time zone: UTC+6

Kyzyl-Tuu is a village in the Naryn Region of Kyrgyzstan. It is part of the At-Bashy District. Its population was 2,291 in 2021.
