= Tash-Bashat, Naryn =

Tash-Bashat Таш-Башат
- village
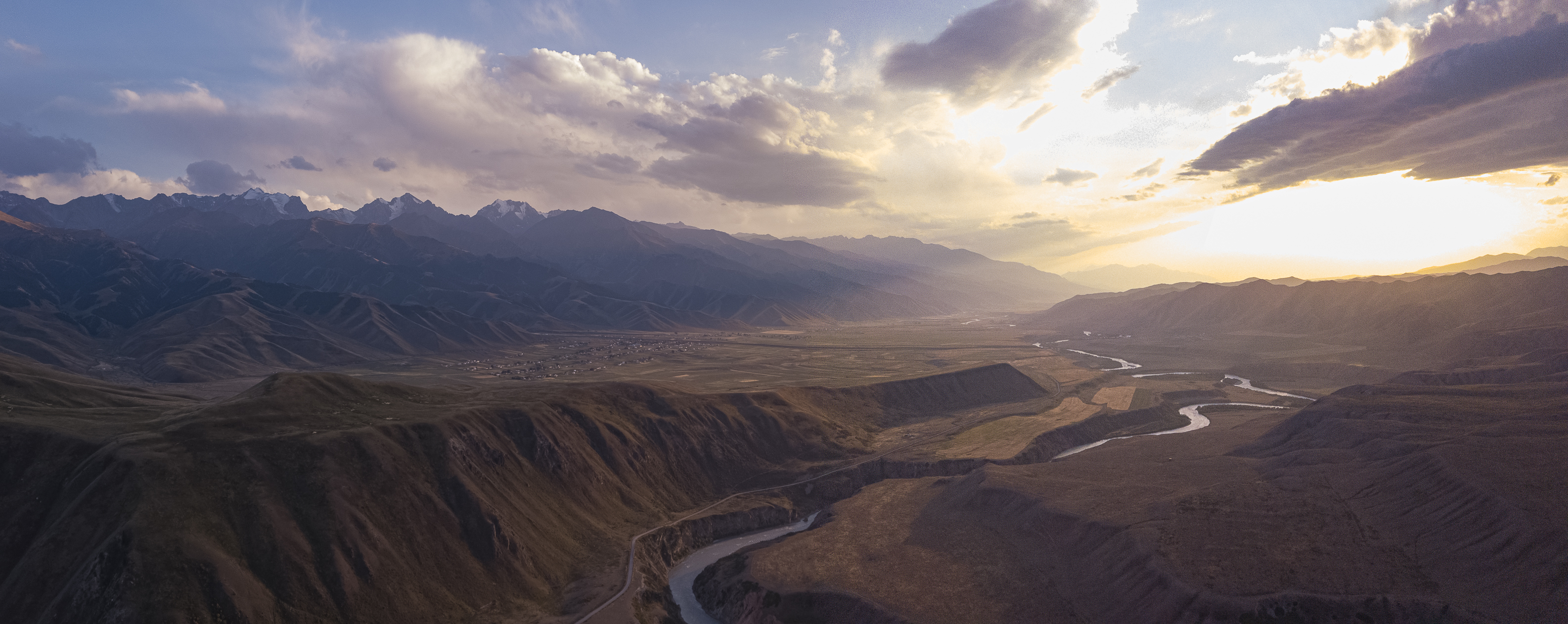

- Location within Kyrgyzstan
- Coordinates: 41°27′59″N 76°23′41″E
- Country: Kyrgyzstan
- Region: Naryn Region
- District: Naryn District
- Elevation: 2,350 m (7,710 ft)

Population (2021)
  - Total: 1,439
- Time zone: UTC+6

Tash-Bashat is a village in Naryn District of Naryn Region of Kyrgyzstan. Its population was 1,439 in 2021.
