= Ak-Bulung, Naryn =

Ak-Bulung Ак-Булуң
- village
- Location within Kyrgyzstan
- Coordinates: 41°27′01″N 76°17′03″E
- Country: Kyrgyzstan
- Region: Naryn Region
- District: Naryn District
- Elevation: 2,200 m (7,200 ft)

Population (2021)
  - Total: 343
- Time zone: UTC+6

Ak-Bulung (or Akbulung) is a village in Naryn District of Naryn Region of Kyrgyzstan. Its population was 343 in 2021.
