= Karool-Tebe =

Karool-Tebe Караултёбё,Кароол-Дөбө
- Location within Kyrgyzstan
- Coordinates: 40°31′48″N 75°57′36″E
- Country: Kyrgyzstan
- Region: Naryn Region
- Elevation: 3,489 m (11,447 ft)
- Time zone: UTC+6

Karool-Tebe is a village in Naryn Region of Kyrgyzstan.
