= Birinchi May, Naryn =

Birinchi May
- Location within Kyrgyzstan
- Coordinates: 41°10′12″N 76°3′0″E
- Country: Kyrgyzstan
- Region: Naryn Region
- District: At-Bashy District
- Elevation: 2,332 m (7,651 ft)

Population (2021)
  - Total: 1,262
- Time zone: UTC+6

Birinchi May is a village in Naryn Region of Kyrgyzstan. It is part of the At-Bashy District. Its population was 1,262 in 2021.

The town of Ak-Moyun is 3 miles (5 km) to the north, and Taldy-Suu is 4 miles (7 km) to the east.
