= Kara-Suu, At-Bashy =

Kara-Suu Кара-Суу
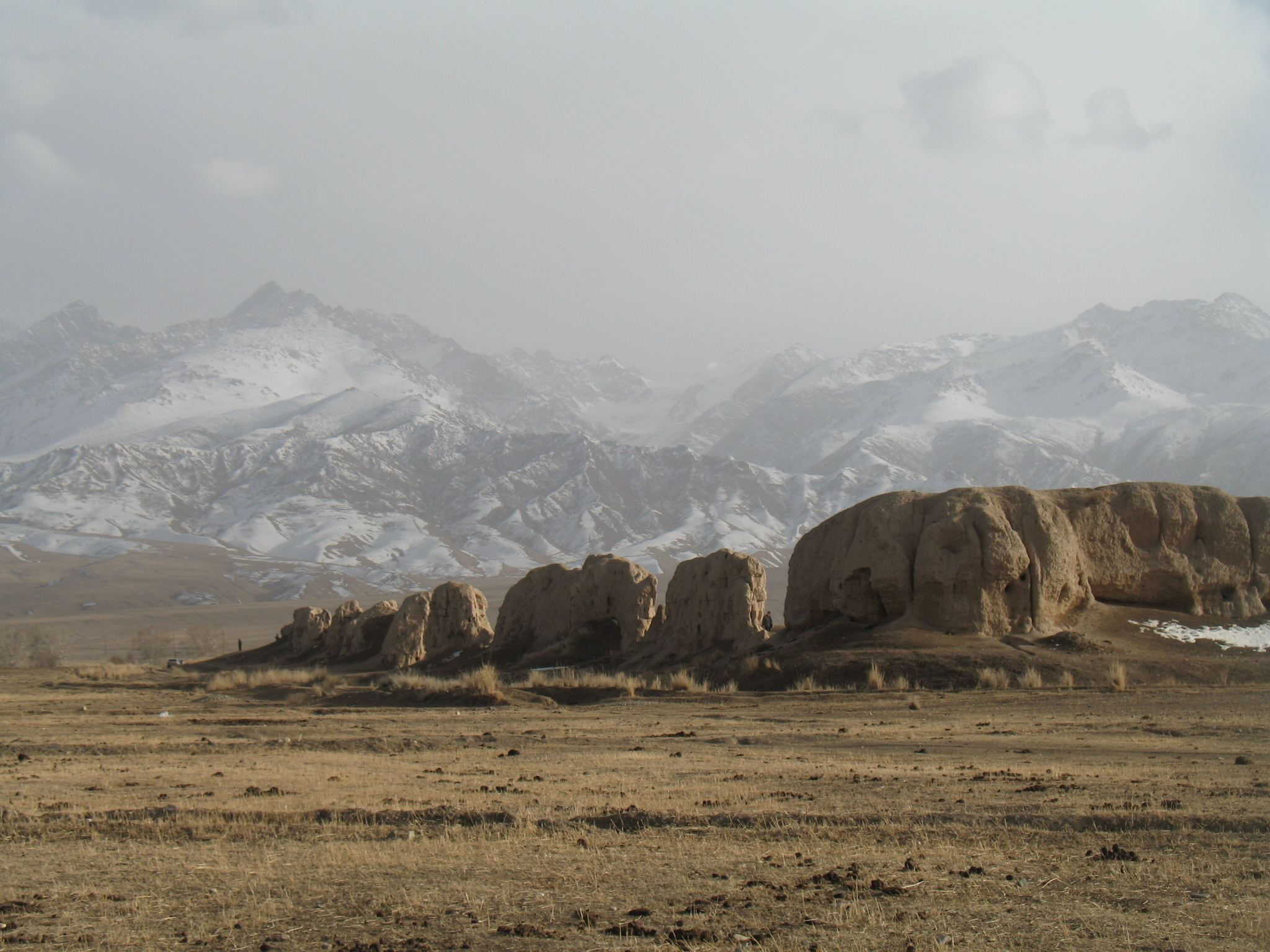
- A view of Qoshoy Qorgon from the northeast

- Location within Kyrgyzstan
- Coordinates: 41°07′44″N 75°40′41″E
- Country: Kyrgyzstan
- Region: Naryn Region
- District: At-Bashy District
- Established: 1929
- Elevation: 2,118 m (6,949 ft)

Population (2021)
  - Total: 5,523

Kara-Suu (Kyrgyz: Кара-Суу) is a village in At-Bashy District of Naryn Region of Kyrgyzstan. Its population was 5,523 in 2021. European route E125 passes through the village. The settlement was established in 1929.

== Population ==
Historical population
Year	Pop.	±% p.a.
2009	3,995	—
2021	5,523	+2.74%
Note: resident population; Sources:
