= List of regions of Kyrgyzstan by Human Development Index =

This is a list of regions of the Kyrgyz Republic (Kyrgyzstan) by Human Development Index as of 2025 with data for the year 2023.

Rank	Region	HDI (2023)
High human development
1	Bishkek City	0.757
2	Chüy Region	0.725
–	Kyrgyzstan (average)	0.720
3	Issyk-Kul Region	0.719
4	Naryn Region	0.703
Medium Human development
5	Batken Region	0.699
6	Osh Region	0.698
7	Talas Region	0.697
8	Jalal-Abad Region	0.696

== See also ==
- List of countries by Human Development Index
