= Kajyrty =

River in Kyrgyzstan

- Native name: Кажырты (Kyrgyz)

Location
- Country: Kyrgyzstan

Physical characteristics
- Source: Song-Köl
  - coordinates: 41°47′16.95″N 75°20′7.56″E
- Mouth: Naryn
  - coordinates: 41°25′20.12″N 75°40′43.11″E
- Length: 62 km (39 mi)
- Basin size: 1,960 km^{2} (760 sq mi)
- Discharge
  - average: 5.2 m^{3}/s (180 cu ft/s)

Basin features
- Progression: Naryn → Syr Darya → Aral Sea
- Tributaries
  - left: Törsuu, Keñsuu, Kumduusuu, Batkaksuu
  - right: Karatal

The Kajyrty (Kyrgyz: Кажырты) is a river in Kyrgyzstan. It flows from Song-Köl into the Naryn. The river is 62 km (39 mi) long and has a drainage basin of 1,960 km^{2} (760 sq mi).

== Course and flow ==
In its upper reaches, the river is known as the Song-Köl and flows through a narrow, deep gorge. Its mean annual discharge is 5.2 m^{3}/s (180 cu ft/s). The river begins to rise in May and recedes in September, following seasonal fluctuations in the level of Song-Köl.

== Tributaries ==
The major tributaries are the Karatal (35 km (22 mi)) from the right, and the Törsuu (21 km (13 mi)), Keñsuu (19 km (12 mi)), Kumduusuu (16 km (10 mi)), and Batkaksuu (15 km (9 mi)) from the left.
