= Song-Köl =

Mountain lake in Kyrgyzstan

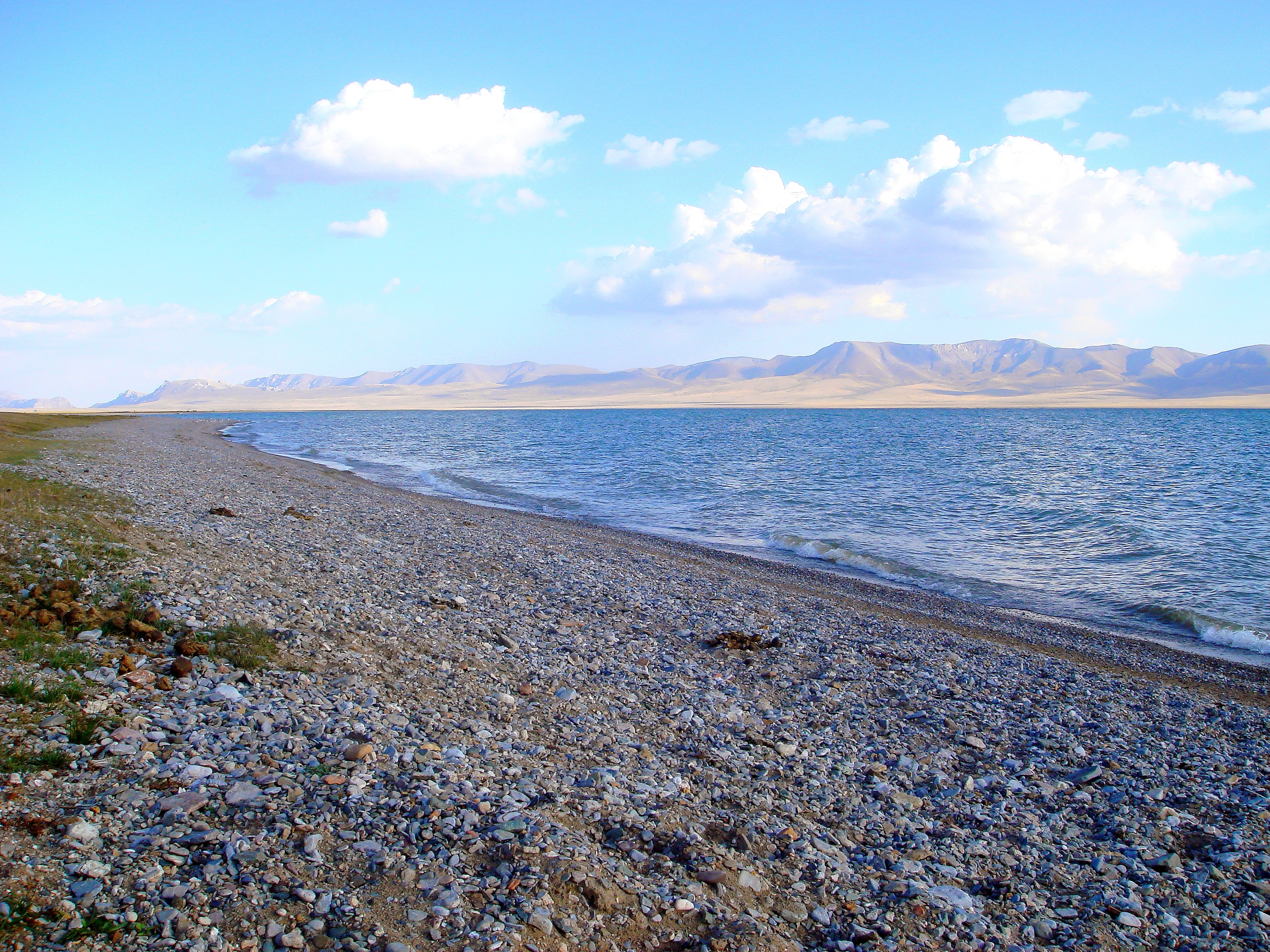
- Northern shore of Song-Köl

- Location within Kyrgyzstan Location within Asia
- Interactive map of Song-Köl
- Coordinates: 41°50′N 75°10′E
- Type: Endorheic; Mountain lake
- Primary inflows: Glaciers
- Primary outflows: Evaporation and the river Kajyrty
- Basin countries: Kyrgyzstan
- Max. length: 29 km (18 mi)
- Surface area: 270 km^{2} (100 sq mi)
- Max. depth: 13.2 m (43 ft)
- Water volume: 2.64 km^{3} (2,140,000 acre⋅ft)
- Surface elevation: 3,016 m (9,895 ft)

Ramsar Wetland
- Official name: Son-Kol Lake
- Designated: 23 January 2011
- Reference no.: 1943

Song-Köl (Kyrgyz: Соң-Көл [soŋ cʰɵl]; lit. 'Final Lake') is a high-altitude lake in northern Naryn Region, Kyrgyzstan. It lies at an elevation of 3,016 metres (9,895 ft) above sea level and has an area of about 270 square kilometres (100 sq mi) and a volume of approximately 2.64 cubic kilometres (0.63 cu mi). The lake is about 29 kilometres (18 mi) long and up to 18 kilometres (11 mi) wide, with a maximum depth of 13.2 metres (43 ft). It is the second largest lake in Kyrgyzstan after Issyk-Kul, and the largest fresh water lake in the country.

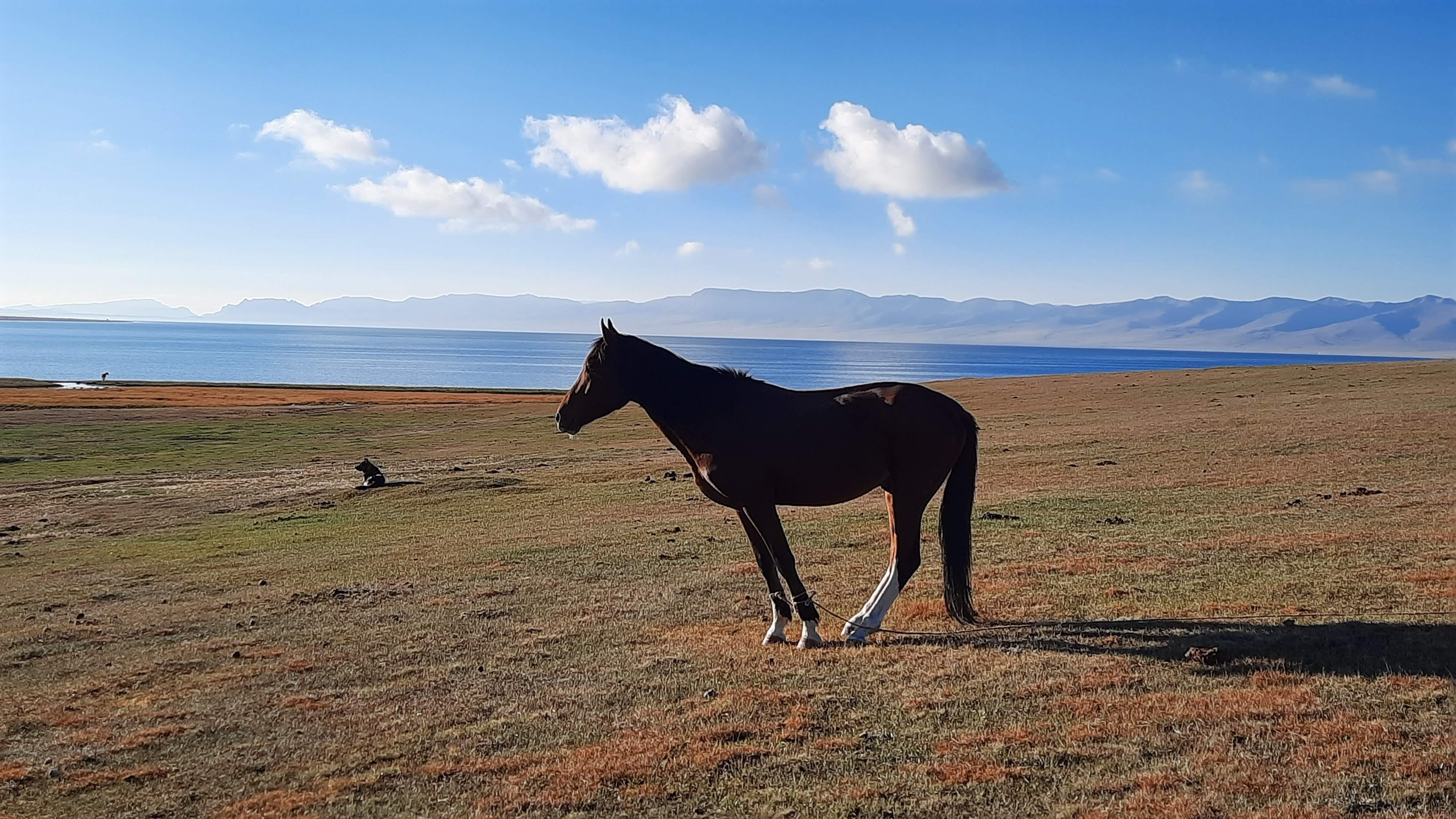
Horse grazing on the shores of Lake Song Kul, in the Naryn region, Kyrgyzstan

== Geography ==
High altitude Song-Köl belongs to the Naryn river basin. The lake sits in the central part of Song-Köl Valley surrounded by Songköl Too ridge from the north, and Borbor Alabas and Moldo Too mountains from the south. Hydrologically, the Song-Köl basin is characterized by poorly developed surface stream flows, and substantial subsurface flow. Four perennial rivers - Kumbel, Aktash, Tashdöbö, and Karakeche - disgorge themselves into the lake. In the south-east, the structural high is cut through by the river Kajyrty (in its upper course also called Song-Köl) that flows into the Naryn.

== Environment ==
=== Climate ===
The mean temperature in the lake basin is −3.5 °C (25.7 °F) with mean temperature of −20 °C (−4 °F) in January, and 11 °C (52 °F) in July. Annual precipitation averages 300–400 mm from April to October, and 100–150 mm from November to March. Snow cover persists for 180-200 days a year. In winter the lake surface freezes, the ice becoming as much as 1-1.2 m thick. The ice on Song-Köl begins to thaw in the middle or at the end of April, and completely disappears by late May.

=== Limnology ===
Strong winds generally prevent persistent thermal stratification, and the water column is often nearly uniform in temperature from the surface to the bottom. Short-lived stratification may nevertheless develop during periods of calm, sunny weather. Maximum near-surface water temperatures reach approximately 20 to 23 °C (68 to 73 °F) in summer.

The lake water is fresh and belongs to the bicarbonate class, magnesium group. The atlas reports mineralization of about 465 milligrams per litre (1.68×10^{−5} lb/cu in) in summer and 306 milligrams per litre (1.11×10^{−5} lb/cu in) in winter. Oxygen conditions are generally favourable, although substantial oxygen depletion may occur beneath the ice in shallow parts of the lake during winter.

=== Ecology ===
In 2011, Song-Köl was designated Kyrgyzstan’s third Wetland of International Importance. Since 1998, part of the lake and its shoreline has been protected within the Karatal-Japyryk Nature Reserve. The protected area includes 3,400 hectares (8,400 acres) of land and 5,200 hectares (13,000 acres) of water.

=== Birds ===
Song-Köl is an important breeding, migration and moulting site for waterbirds and other bird species. About 190 bird species have been recorded at the lake. It supports a breeding colony of black-headed gulls and one of the highest-altitude breeding populations of the demoiselle crane. The bar-headed goose, black stork and several large raptors also breed in the area, while ruddy shelducks and waders gather at the lake during migration and moulting. Song-Köl was designated an Important Bird Area and is now recognized as a Key Biodiversity Area of global significance.

== History ==
There are several signs of nomadic life from the earlier times in the Son Kul valley. Ancient petroglyphs can be found east from the lake and there are round stone settings that have similarities with the ones found in Mongolia and Altai area. Several different sized burial mounds can be also found around the lake.
