= Dostuk, Naryn =

Dostuk Достук
- Location within Kyrgyzstan
- Coordinates: 41°21′36″N 75°37′48″E
- Country: Kyrgyzstan
- Region: Naryn Region
- District: Naryn District

Population (2021)
  - Total: 815

Dostuk (Kyrgyz: Достук) is a village in Naryn District of Naryn Region of Kyrgyzstan on the river Naryn and highway A361 about 35 km west of Naryn. Its population was 750 in 2021. Until 2012 it was an urban-type settlement.

== Population ==
Historical population
Year	Pop.	±% p.a.
1970	952	—
1979	1,045	+1.04%
1989	1,218	+1.54%
1999	817	−3.91%
2009	750	−0.85%
2021	815	+0.70%
Note: resident population; Sources:
