= At-Bashy District =

Coordinates: 41°10′N 75°48′E

At-Bashy Ат-Башы району
- District
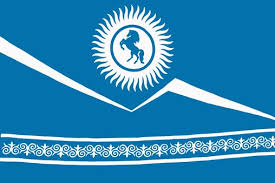
- Flag

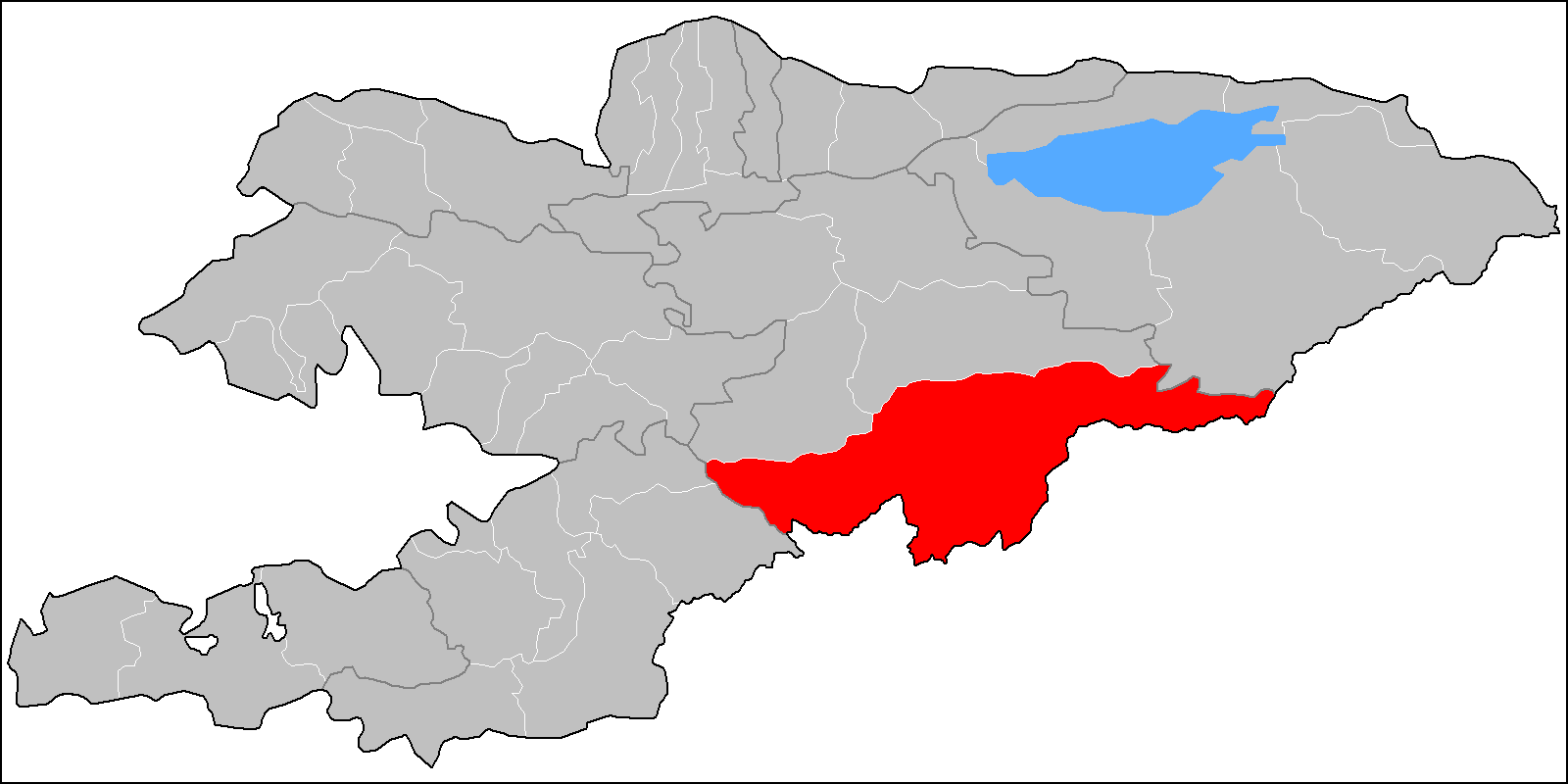
- Country: Kyrgyzstan
- Region: Naryn Region
- At-Bashy District: 23 July 1930

Area
  - Total: 15,354 km^{2} (5,928 sq mi)
- Elevation: 5,982 m (19,626 ft)

Population (2021)
  - Total: 55,771
  - Density: 3.6323/km^{2} (9.4077/sq mi)
- Time zone: UTC+6

At-Bashy (Kyrgyz: Ат-Башы району) is a district of Naryn Region in Kyrgyzstan established in its present borders in 1930. The administrative center is at At-Bashy. Its area is 15,354 square kilometres (5,928 sq mi), and its resident population was 55,771 in 2021. The mountain lake Chatyr-Kul lies in the southwestern part of the district.

== Geography ==
=== Topography ===
The At-Bashy District is in the southern part of the Naryn Region and it is limited from the north by the Baybiche Too, Naryn Too, and Jaman-Too, from the south by Torugart-Too and Kakshaal Too, and from the west by the Fergana Range. Among other mountain ranges of the district are At-Bashy Range and Jangy Jer. The difference in absolute elevations in the mountainous areas varies from 3,000 to 5,982 metres (9,843 to 19,626 ft), and in the valleys from 2,000 to 3,800 metres (6,600 to 12,500 ft). In the eastern part of the region, near the border with China, there is the maximum absolute elevation of Dankov Peak - 5,982 metres (19,626 ft).

=== Hydrology ===
The hydrographic network is represented by the rivers of the Naryn basin - the At-Bashy (river) with an annual average flow rate of 41.6 m3/s, and maximum - up to 266 m3/s; River Kara-Koyun - maximum flow rate 40.3 m3/sec, as well as the Ak-Sai River in the Tarim River Basin. The rivers are mudflow and flood-prone, the frequency of mudflows of a snow-rain, mixed, rarely glacial nature is once in 6-10 years. Chatyr-Kul with an area of 153.5 square kilometres (59.3 sq mi) lays at an elevation of 3,530 metres (11,580 ft).

=== Climate ===
The minimum temperature in the district can reach −30 °C in valleys and −45 °C in the mountains (with a maximum peak of −54 °C in the Ak-Sai intermountain depression), and the maximum temperatures from +30 °C in the valleys to 20 °C in the mountains. The daily maximum of 1% precipitation in the valleys varies from 40 to 60 mm, and in the mountains in some areas up to 80 mm. The average annual precipitation varies from 300 mm in valleys to 600 mm in the mountains. The number of days with snow cover in the mountain zone varies from 200 to 300 days (and more in some parts of the ranges), in the valley from 100 up to 200 days. Snow loads in the mountains - 80-150 kg/m2, in the valleys 40-60 kg/m2, with a maximum up to 300 kg/m2. The height of the snow cover is 20 cm in the valley part, up to 40 cm in the mountains, and up to 80 cm in some parts of the ranges.

== Population ==
Historical population
Year	Pop.	±% p.a.
1970	32,820	—
1979	39,036	+1.95%
1989	44,872	+1.40%
1999	45,219	+0.08%
2009	49,238	+0.86%
2021	55,771	+1.04%
Note: resident population; Sources:

== Rural communities and villages ==
In total, At-Bashy District includes 19 settlements in 11 rural communities (ayyl aymagy). Each rural community includes one or several villages. The rural communities and settlements in the At-Bashy District are as follows:

1. Acha-Kayyngdy (seat: Acha-Kayyngdy)
2. Ak-Jar (seat: Ak-Jar)
3. Ak-Moyun (seat: Ak-Moyun; incl. Birdik)
4. Ak-Muz (seat: Ak-Muz)
5. Ak-Talaa (seat: Kalinin; incl. Terek-Suu)
6. At-Bashy (seat: At-Bashy)
7. Bash-Kayyngdy (seat: Bash-Kayyngdy; incl. Bolshevik)
8. Kara-Koyun (seat: Kyzyl-Tuu; incl. Kara-Bulung)
9. Kara-Suu (seat: Kara-Suu; incl. Choko-Biy)
10. Kazybek (seat: Kazybek; incl. Jangy-Küch)
11. Taldy-Suu (seat: Taldy-Suu; incl. Özgörüsh and Birinchi May)
Settlements of the At-Bashy District.

== See also ==
- Karool-Tebe
- Kök-Aygyr
- Tash Rabat
