= Chatyr-Köl =

Mountain lake in Naryn Region, Kyrgyzstan

- Чатыр-Көл (Kyrgyz)
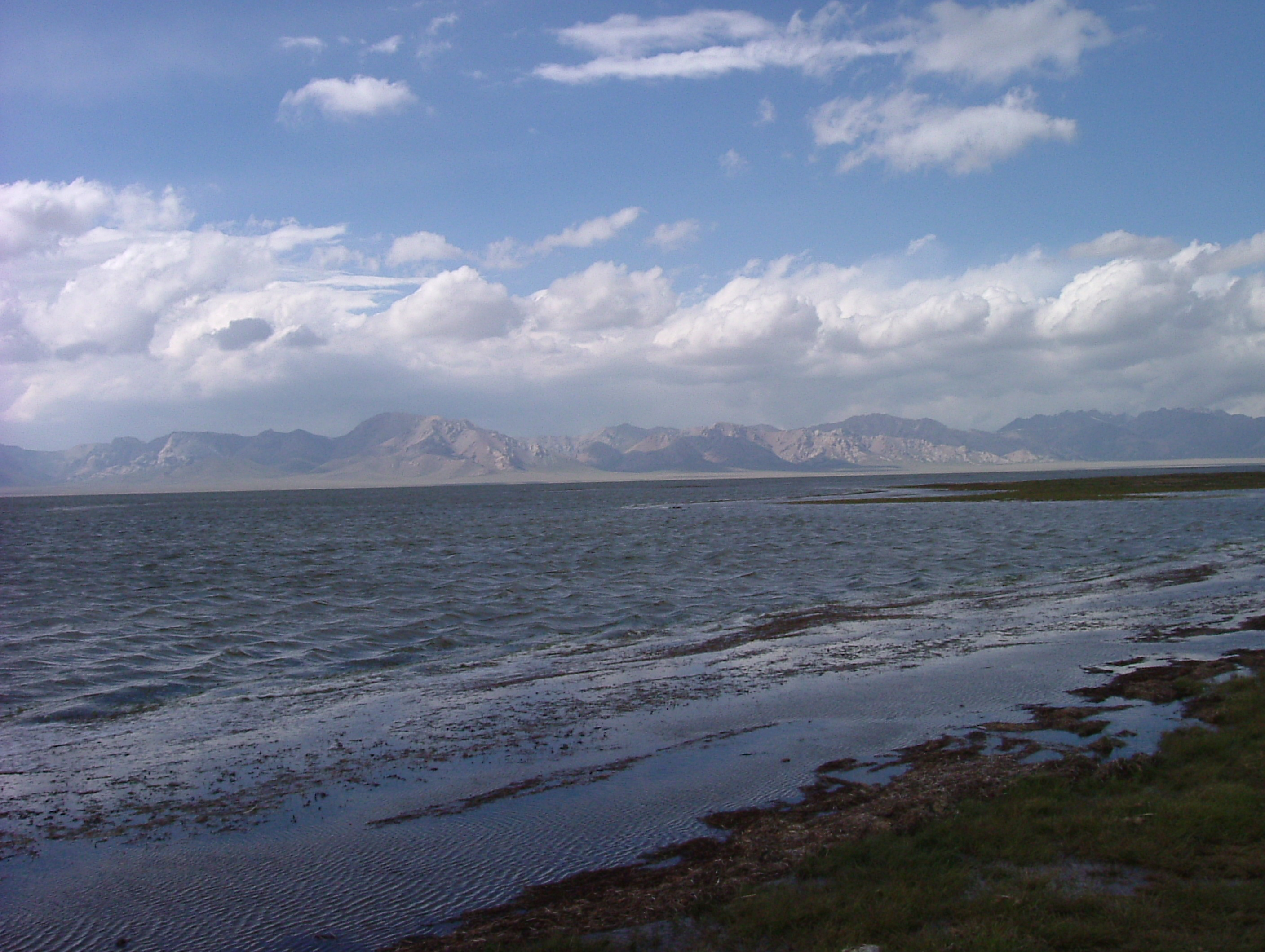

- Location within Kyrgyzstan Location within Asia
- Location: Tian Shan mountains, Naryn Region
- Coordinates: 40°37′N 75°18′E
- Type: Endorheic; Mountain lake
- Primary inflows: Glaciers
- Primary outflows: Evaporation
- Catchment area: 1,050 km^{2} (410 sq mi)
- Basin countries: Kyrgyzstan
- Designation: Ramsar site
- Max. length: 23 km (14 mi)
- Max. width: 10 km (6.2 mi)
- Surface area: 170.6 km^{2} (65.9 sq mi)
- Max. depth: 16.5 m (54 ft)
- Water volume: 0.62 km^{3} (0.15 cu mi)
- Shore length^{1}: 58 km (36 mi)
- Surface elevation: 3,530 m (11,580 ft)
- Islands: none
- Settlements: none

Ramsar Wetland
- Official name: Chatyr Kul
- Designated: 8 November 2005
- Reference no.: 1588
- ^{1} Shore length is not a well-defined measure.

Chatyr-Köl (Kyrgyz: Чатыр-Көл [t͡ɕʰɑ̀tʰɯɾ cʰɵl]; lit. 'Celestial Lake'), also Chatyr-Kul (Russian: Чатыр-Куль), is a large endorheic freshwater alpine lake in the Tian Shan mountains in At-Bashy District of Naryn Province, Kyrgyzstan. It occupies the lowest part of the tectonic Chatyr-Köl Depression between the At-Bashy Range and Torugart Range, at an elevation of more than 3,500 m (11,500 ft) above sea level.

The lake is 22.8 km (14.2 mi) long and up to 10.5 km (6.5 mi) wide. Its surface area is about 170.6 km^{2} (65.9 sq mi) although some sources give 153.5 km^{2} (59.3 sq mi). Its maximum depth is 16.5 m (54 ft) (or 20.4 m (67 ft) according to other measurements), its mean depth is 3.8 m (12 ft), and its volume is about 620×10^{6} m^{3} (22×10^{9} cu ft). The shoreline is approximately 58.5 km (36.4 mi) long.

== Geography ==
The Chatyr-Köl basin is characterized by a weakly dissected lacustrine-fluvial accumulative plain. Most of the shoreline is low; the southern and eastern shores are predominantly marshy and include six terrace levels. Along the northern shore, where folds of Middle Paleozoic rocks approach the lake, the banks are higher and form abrasion scarps.

The lakeside plain consists mainly of Quaternary deposits of lacustrine origin and is bordered by alluvial-proluvial plains. The basin lies within a zone of widespread permafrost. Thermokarst depressions and sink-like hollows, some occupied by small lakes, as well as frost-heave mounds, gullies and bank collapses, are associated with seasonal freezing and thawing under the severe climate of the Inner Tian Shan.

== Climate ==
The mean annual temperature in the lake basin is −5.6 °C (21.9 °F), with mean temperature of −22 °C (−8 °F) in January, and 7.1 °C (44.8 °F) in July. The maximum temperature in summer is 24 °C (75 °F), and the minimum one in winter is −50 °C (−58 °F). Some 88-90% of the lake basin's 208–269 mm of annual precipitation falls in summer. From October to end of April the lake surface freezes, the ice becoming as much as 0.25-1.5 m thick.

== Hydrology ==
The water of Chatyr Kul Lake is yellowish-green with water transparency of up to 4 metres (13 ft). The mineralization of the lake ranges from 0.5 to 1.0 milligrams per liter (chloride, hydrocarbonate, sodium and magnesium type of mineralization). The salinity of the lake is 2 ppt. Mineral sources in the south part of the lake have mineralization of from 5 to 7 grams (0.18 to 0.25 oz) per liter and pH = 5,8-6,0. Flow rate is 1,866 m^{3} (65,900 cu ft) in winter and 3,629 cubic metres (128,200 cu ft) during summer. 41 small streams debouches into the lake, of those 21 originate in Torugart Range and 20 - in Atbashy Range.

Negative water balance of the lake over the last decades causes the decline in the lake level. The mineral water from the sources is cold and has a strong mineral taste and flow first into the small Chatyr Kul lake that is about 1,5 meters higher than the actual Chatyr Kul.

== Protection ==
Since 1998, a section of the lake and its shore (3,200 ha land, 3,954 ha water) is protected as part of the Karatal-Japyryk Nature Reserve. The whole lake has been a game reserve (IUCN category IV) since 1972. The game reserve was established to protect water fowl, including the bar-headed goose. The lake is a Ramsar site of globally significant biodiversity (Ramsar Site RDB Code 2KG002).

== Gallery ==
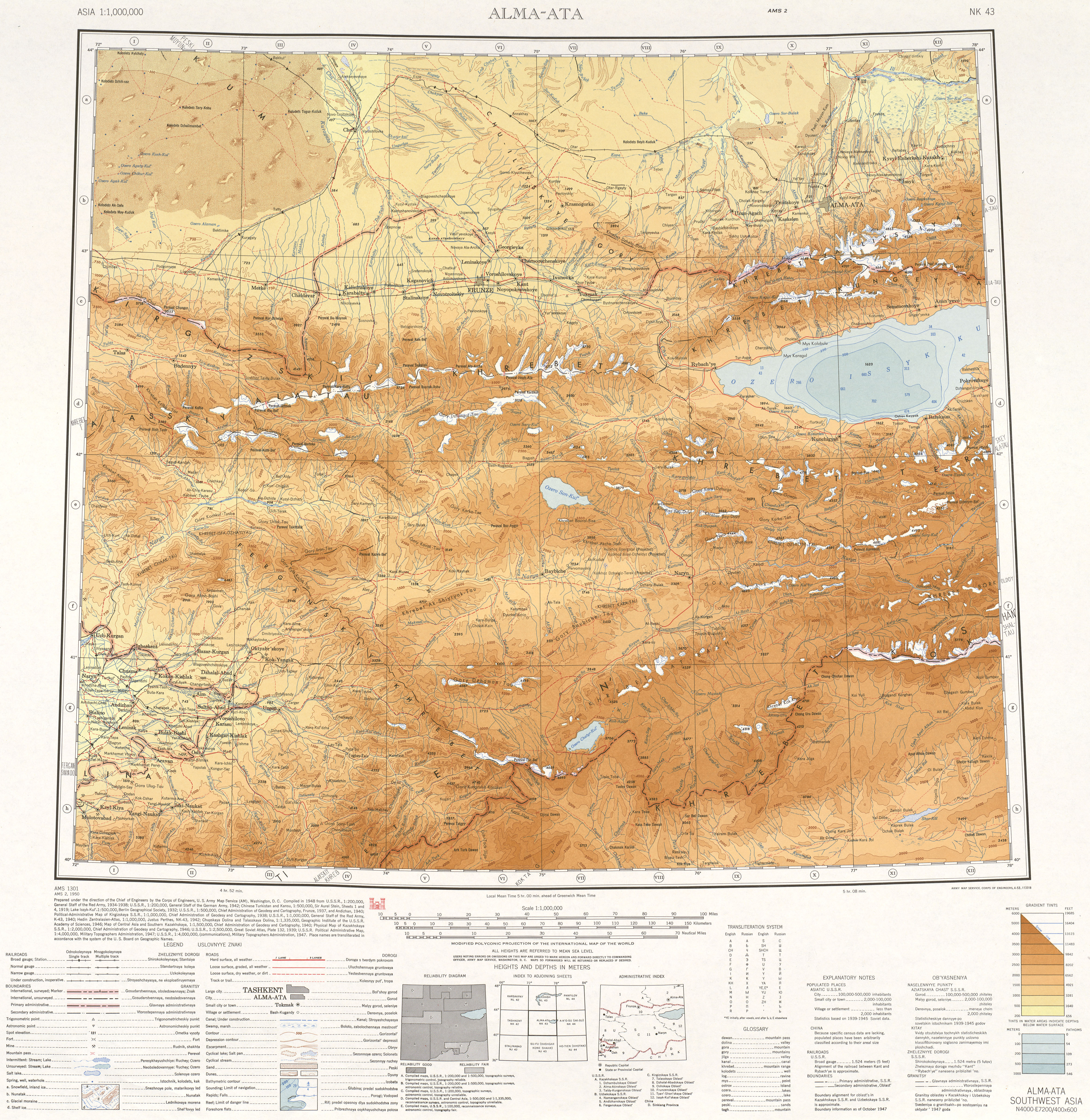
Map of the region including the Ozero Chatyr-Kul' (AMS, 1948)

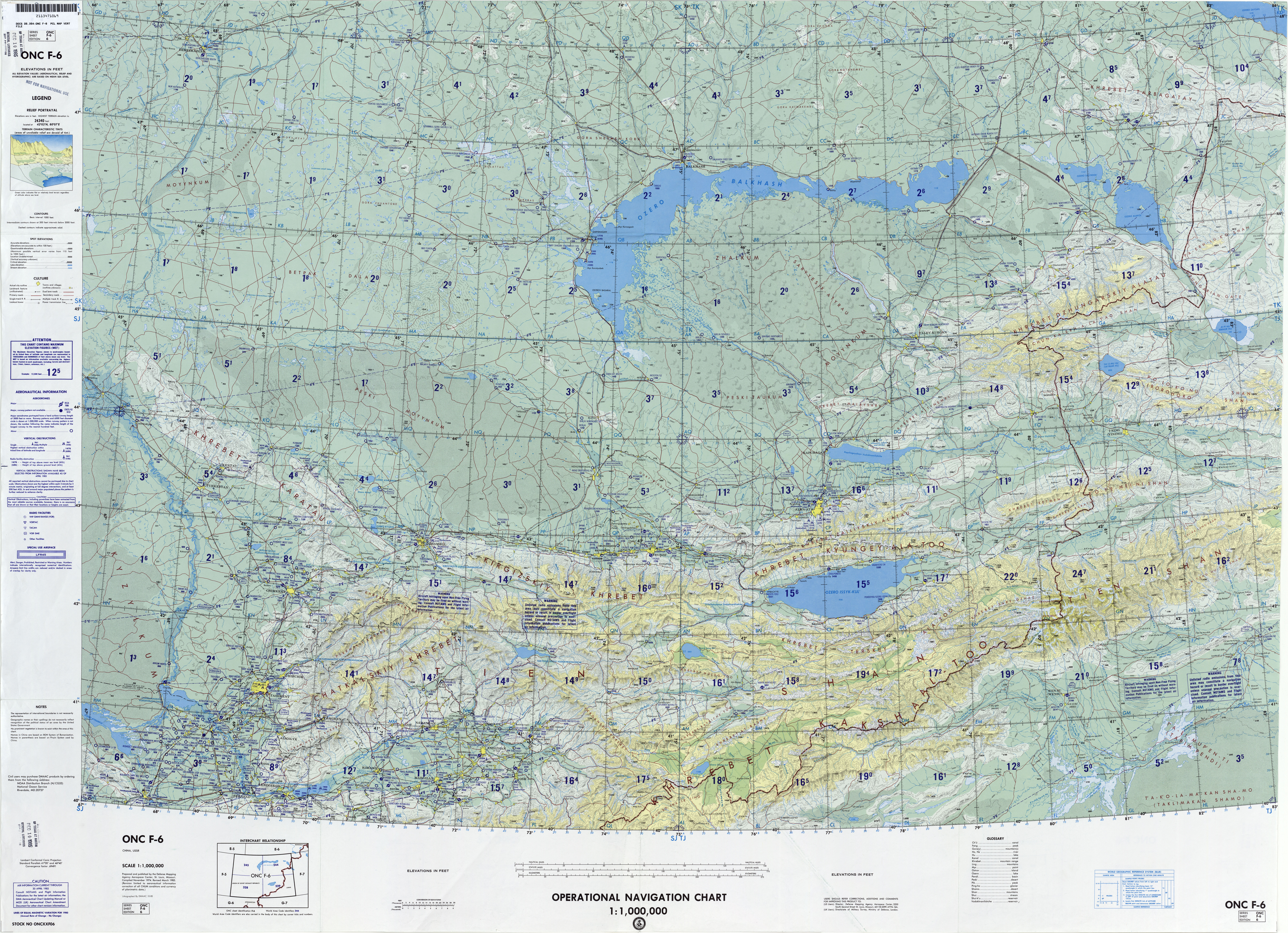
Map of the region including the Ozero Chatyr-kel' (DMA, 1985)
