= Baybiche Too =

Mountain range in Kyrgyzstan

- Location within Kyrgyzstan

Highest point
- Elevation: 4,337 m (14,229 ft)

Dimensions
- Length: 140 km (87 mi) E-W
- Width: 13 km (8.1 mi) N-S

Naming
- Native name: Байбичетоо (Kyrgyz)

Geography
- Country: Kyrgyzstan
- Range coordinates: 41°09′N 75°09′E

Geology
- Rock type(s): Composed of uplifted Paleozoic limestones, schists, and granites

The Baybiche Too (or Baybichetoo) (Kyrgyz: Байбичетоо) is a mountain range in the central Tien-Shan separating the Orto Naryn and Atbashi valleys. The range stretches for 140 km in a roughly east-west direction. The highest point in Baybiche Too reaches an elevation of 4337 meters, while the average elevation of the range is approximately 3890 meters. The range is relatively narrow, with an average width of 13 kilometers. On the eastern side, the range features narrow and rugged gorges, which are carved by streams and rivers that flow down the slopes. These include notable antecedent gorges such as Kara-Buk, Ak-Tal, Uchkun, and Terek. The mountains of Baybiche Too are flat, and the range lacks glaciers.

== Geology ==
The range is primarily composed of uplifted Paleozoic limestones, schists, and granites.Structurally, it is classified as a horst-anticline.

== Flora ==
The northeastern slopes are partially covered with forests comprising pine trees and shrubs, while subalpine vegetation is found in ravines at elevations between 3100–3300 m. The southern sunny slopes are dominated by grasses such as feather grass, wormwood, and sagebrush.
