= Naryn Region =

Region of Kyrgyzstan

Naryn Region Нарын облусу (Kyrgyz) Нарынская область (Russian)
- Region
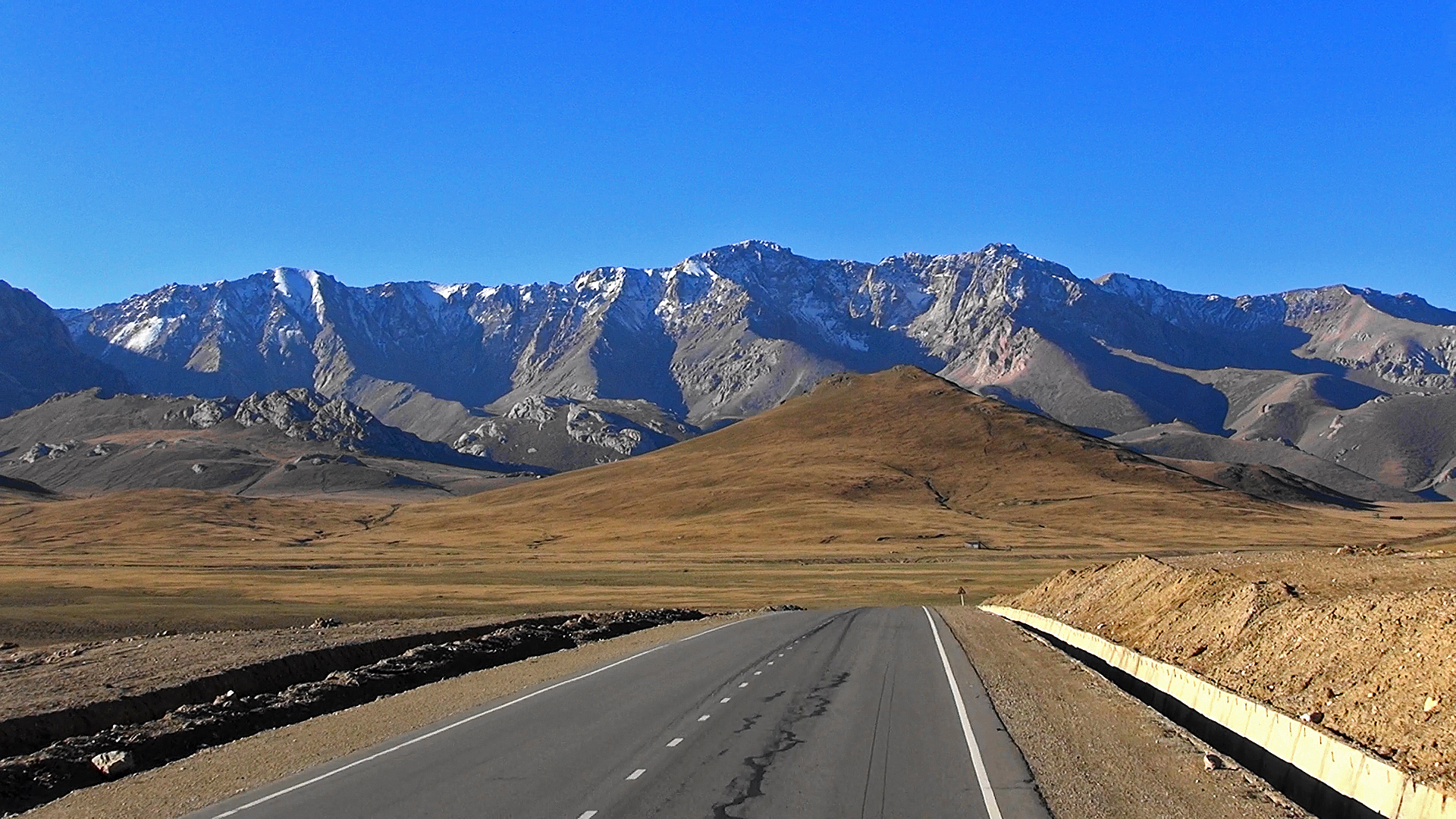
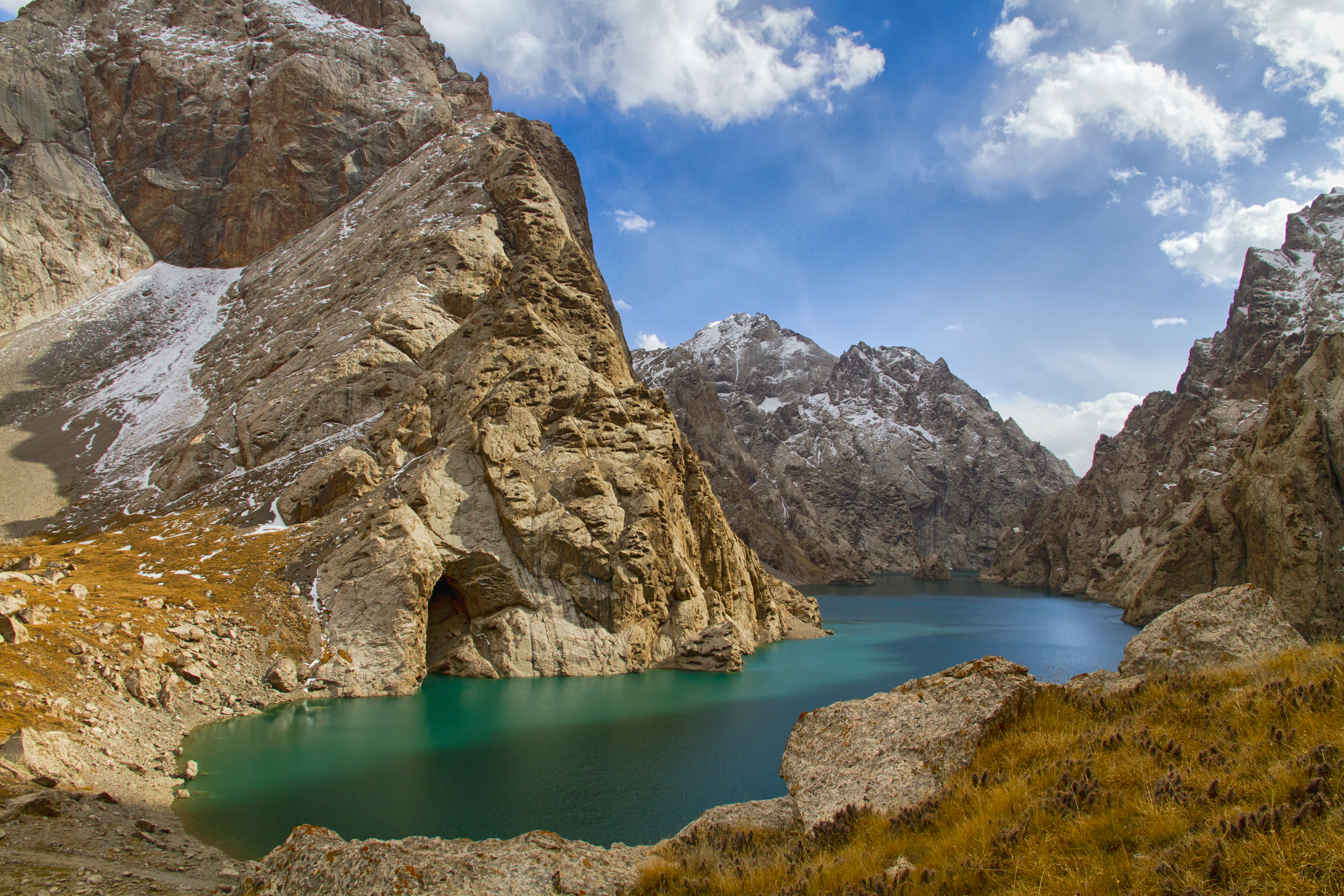
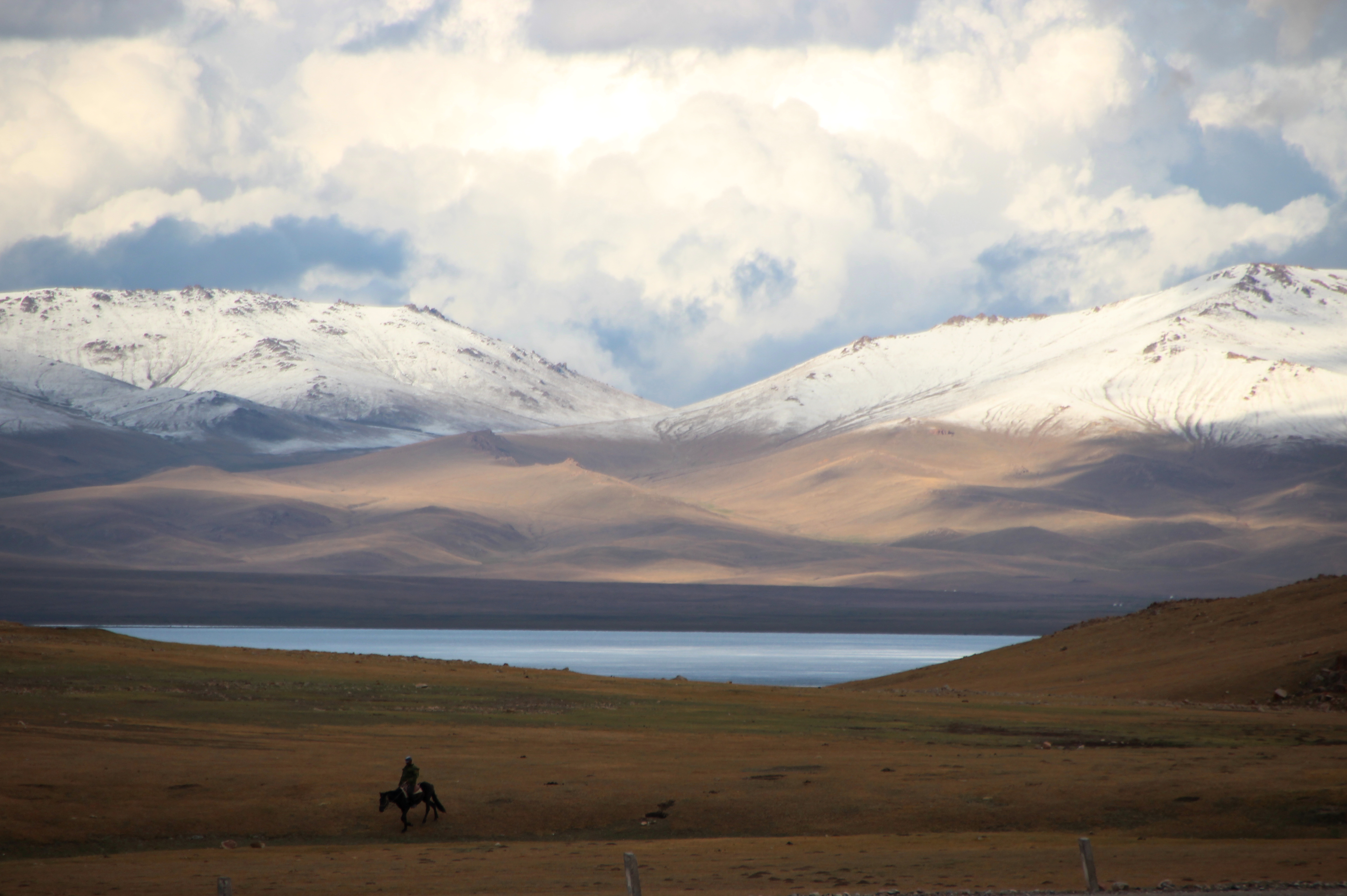
- From the top, Torugart Pass, Köl-Suu, Song-Köl

- Flag Coat of arms

- Map of Kyrgyzstan, location of Naryn Region highlighted
- Coordinates: 41°30′N 75°30′E
- Country: Kyrgyzstan
- Capital: Naryn

Government
  - Gubernator: Nurbek Satarov

Area
  - Total: 44,160 km^{2} (17,050 sq mi)

Population (2023-01-01)
  - Total: 308,348
  - Density: 6.983/km^{2} (18.08/sq mi)
- Time zone: UTC+6 (KGT)
- ISO 3166 code: KG-N
- Districts: 5
- Cities: 1
- Villages: 134
- HDI (2021): 0.674 medium · 5th

Naryn Region (Note: Kyrgyz: Нарын облусу, romanized: Naryn oblusu; Russian: Нарынская область, romanized: Narynskaya oblast) is the largest region of Kyrgyzstan. It is located in the east of the country and borders with Chüy Region in the north, Issyk-Kul Region in the northeast, Xinjiang Uyghur Autonomous Region of China in the southeast, Osh Region in the southwest, and Jalal-Abad Region in the west. Its capital is Naryn. Its total area is 44,160 km^{2} (17,050 sq mi). The resident population of the region was 292,140 as of January 2021.

The main highway runs from the Chinese border at Torugart Pass north to Balykchy on Lake Issyk-Kul. It is known as the location of Lake Song-Köl, Lake Chatyr-Köl, and Tash Rabat.

The population of Naryn oblast is 99% Kyrgyz. The economy is dominated by animal herding (sheep, horses, yaks), with wool and meat as the main products. Mining of various minerals developed during the Soviet era has largely been abandoned as uneconomical. It boasts mountains, alpine pastures, and Song Köl Lake which during summer months attracts large herds of sheep and horses with their herders and yurts.

== History ==
The region was established on 21 November 1939 as Tien-Shan Region. On 20 December 1962, the region was dissolved, but on 11 December 1970 it was re-established as Naryn Region. On 5 October 1988 it was merged into Issyk-Kul Region, and, finally, on 14 December 1990, Naryn Region was re-established.

== Divisions ==
The Naryn Region is divided administratively into one city of regional significance (Naryn) and five districts:

District	Seat	Map
Ak-Talaa District	Baetov	
At-Bashy District	At-Bashy	
Jumgal District	Chaek	
Kochkor District	Kochkor	
Naryn District	Naryn	

Naryn Region contains no cities of district significance and no urban-type settlements.

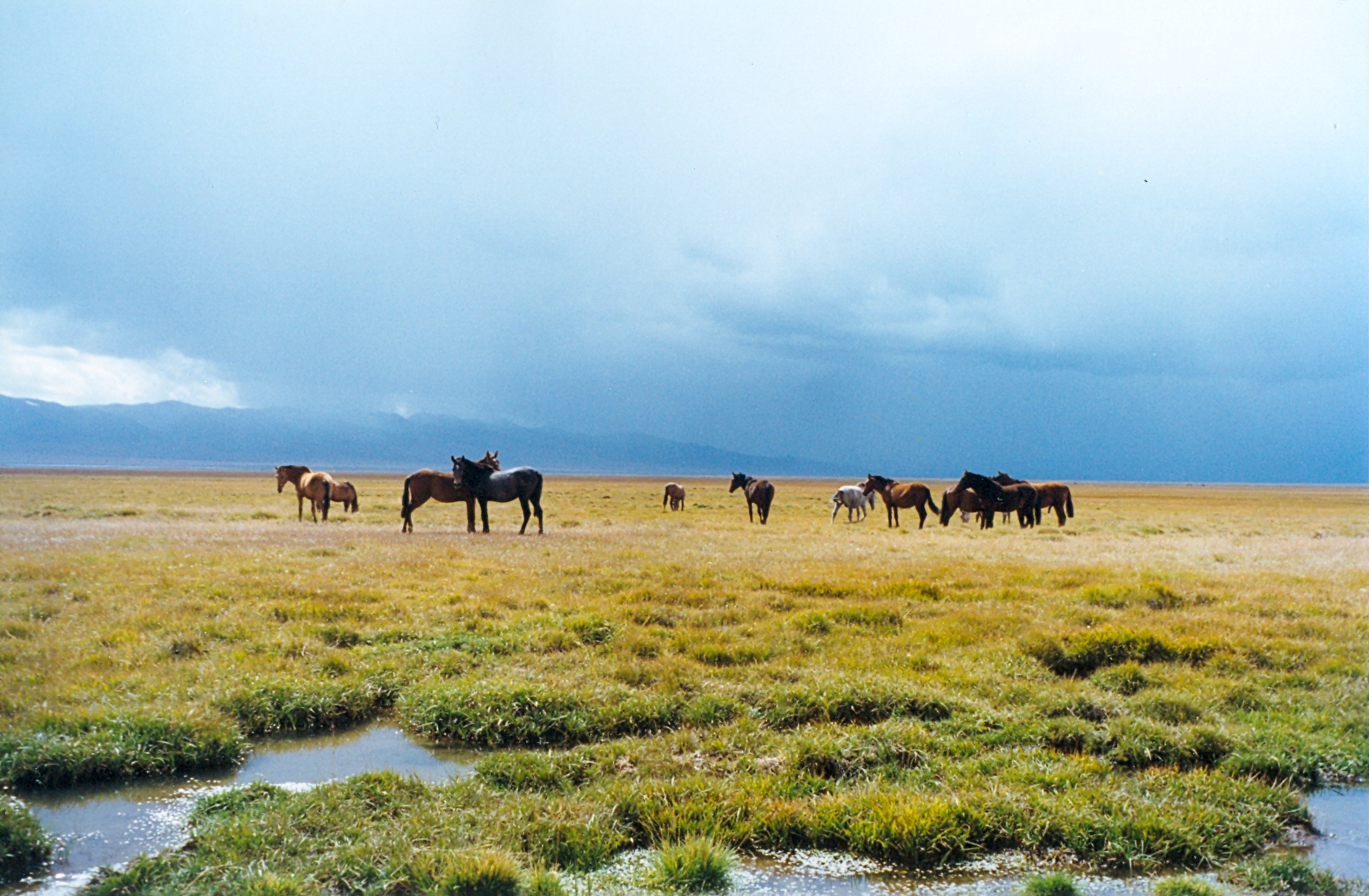
Horses grazing near Son-Kul

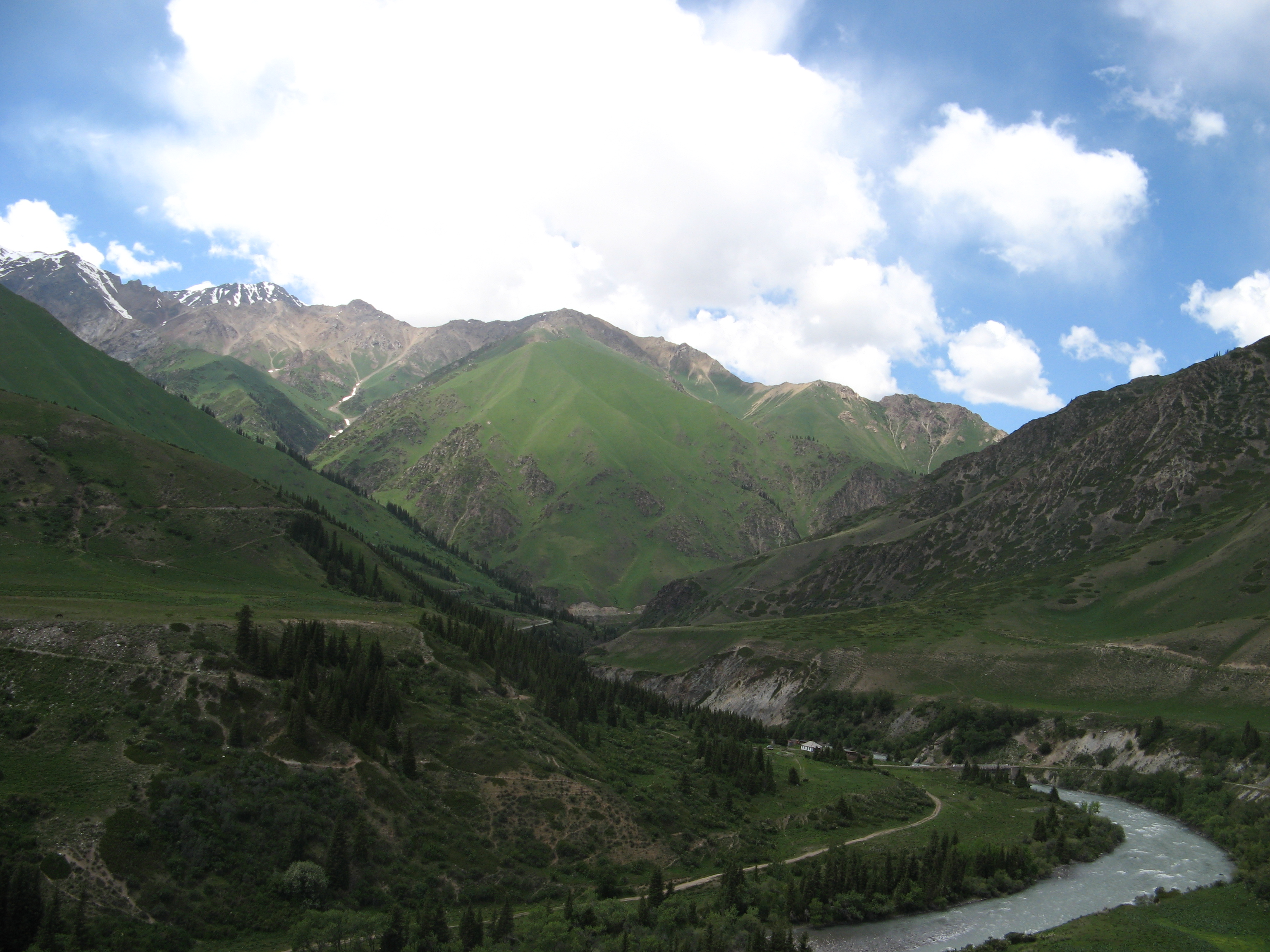
Naryn countryside

== Demographics ==
The population of Naryn Region, according to the Population and Housing Census of 2009 amounted to 245,300 (enumerated de facto population) or 257,800 (de jure population). The region's population estimate for the beginning of 2021 was 292,140.

Historical populations in Naryn Region
Year	Pop.	±% p.a.
1970	176,451	—
1979	214,459	+2.19%
1989	247,931	+1.46%
1999	249,115	+0.05%
2009	257,768	+0.34%
2021	292,140	+1.05%
Note: resident population; Source:

=== Ethnic composition ===
According to the 2009 Census, the ethnic composition of the Naryn Region (de jure population) was:

Ethnic group	Population	Proportion of Naryn Region population
Kyrgyzs	255,799	99.2%
Uzbeks	568	0.2%
Dungans	429	0.2%
Uygurs	339	0.1%
Kazakhs	215	0.1%
Russians	157	0.1%
other groups	261	0.1%

== Basic socio-economic indicators ==
The economically active population of Naryn Region in 2009 was 106,673, of which 96,862 were employed and 9,811 (9.2%) were unemployed.

- Export: 0.9 million US dollars (2008)
- Import: 4.0 million US dollars (2008)
- Direct Foreign Investments: 1.1 million US dollars (in 2008)
