= List of dams and reservoirs in Kyrgyzstan =

Dams and reservoirs in Kyrgyzstan are used for irrigation, water supply, hydro-electric power generation or combination of these. The country's largest reservoirs are listed below.

Name	Location	River	Designed Capacity millions of m^{3}	Surface area km^{2}	Dam height, m	Primary usage	Year built
Ala-Archa Reservoir	Chüy Region	Ala-Archa	39	5.21	22	Irrigation	1968
At-Bashy Reservoir	Jalal-Abad Region	Naryn	10		79	Hydroelectricity	1970
Bazar-Korgon Reservoir	Jalal-Abad Region	Kara-Üngkür	30	2.8	25	Irrigation	1962
Kambar-Ata-2 Reservoir	Jalal-Abad Region	Naryn	70		60	Hydroelectricity	2010
Kirov Reservoir	Talas Region	Talas	550	26.5	83	Irrigation	1975
Kürpsay Reservoir	Jalal-Abad Region	Naryn	270	12.2	110	Hydroelectricity	1981
Nayman Reservoir	Osh Region	Abshyrsay	40	3.2	40.5	Regulation, irrigation	1968
Orto-Tokoy Reservoir	Naryn Region	Chu	470	26	52	Irrigation	1956
Papan Reservoir	Osh Region	Ak-Buura	260	7.1	120	Irrigation, water supply	1980
Shamaldy-Say Reservoir	Jalal-Abad Region	Naryn	41		37	Hydroelectricity	1992
Sokuluk Reservoir	Chüy Region	Sokuluk	11.5	1.77	28	Irrigation	1968
Tash-Kömür Reservoir	Jalal-Abad Region	Naryn	140		75	Hydroelectricity	1985
Toktogul Reservoir	Jalal-Abad Region	Naryn	195,000	284.3	215	Hydroelectricity, irrigation	1974
Tortgul Reservoir	Batken Region	Isfara	90	6.6	3	Irrigation	1971
Üch-Korgon Reservoir	Jalal-Abad Region	Naryn	53	4	34	Hydroelectricity	1974

Citations:
