= List of power stations in Kyrgyzstan =

Listing of all power stations in the country of Kyrgyzstan

This article lists all power stations in Kyrgyzstan.

== Thermal ==
Power plant	Capacity (MW)	Year completed
Bishkek	674	1961

== Hydroelectric ==
Hydroelectric station	Capacity (MW)	Year completed	River
At-Bashy	40	1970	Naryn
Kambar-Ata-2	360	2010	Naryn
Kürpsay	800	1976	Naryn
Shamaldy-Say	240	1996	Naryn
Tash-Kömür	450	1987	Naryn
Toktogul	1,200	1974	Naryn
Üch-Korgon	180	1974	Naryn

== See also ==
- Energy in Kyrgyzstan
- List of power stations in Asia
- List of largest power stations in the world
