= Jamandavan =

- Etymology: The name Jamandavan comes from Kyrgyz jaman (“bad”, “difficult”) and davan (“mountain pass”) meaning “difficult pass”, originally a locality.
- Native name: Жамандаван (Kyrgyz)

Location
- Country: Kyrgyzstan
- Region: Naryn Region
- District: Toguz-Toro District

Physical characteristics
- Source
  - location: northern slope of Jaman-Too
- Mouth: Ala-Buga
  - coordinates: 41°20′09″N 74°40′42″E
- Length: 64 km (40 mi)
- Basin size: 335 km^{2} (129 sq mi)
- Discharge
  - average: 2.6–3.5 m^{3}/s (92–124 cu ft/s)

Basin features
- Progression: Ala-Buga → Naryn → Syr Darya → Aral Sea

The Jamandavan (Kyrgyz: Жамандаван) is a river in Toguz-Toro District, Naryn Region, Kyrgyzstan. It is a right tributary of the Ala-Buga.

The river is 64 km (40 mi) long and has a drainage basin of 335 km^{2} (129 sq mi). It originates on the northern slope of the Jaman-Too range. In its upper reaches, it is known as Syrtkashka-Suu. After its confluence with the Tuura-Suu, it is called Jamandavan and flows northward through a narrow valley.

In its middle and lower reaches, the valley widens and becomes marshy. The average annual discharge is 2.6–3.5 m^{3}/s (92–124 cu ft/s). The highest flow occurs in June and July, while the lowest flow is observed in February and March. The river has high water from April to September and low water from October to March.

The Jamandavan is mainly fed by snow, glaciers and springs. Its waters are used for irrigation.
