= Energy in Kyrgyzstan =

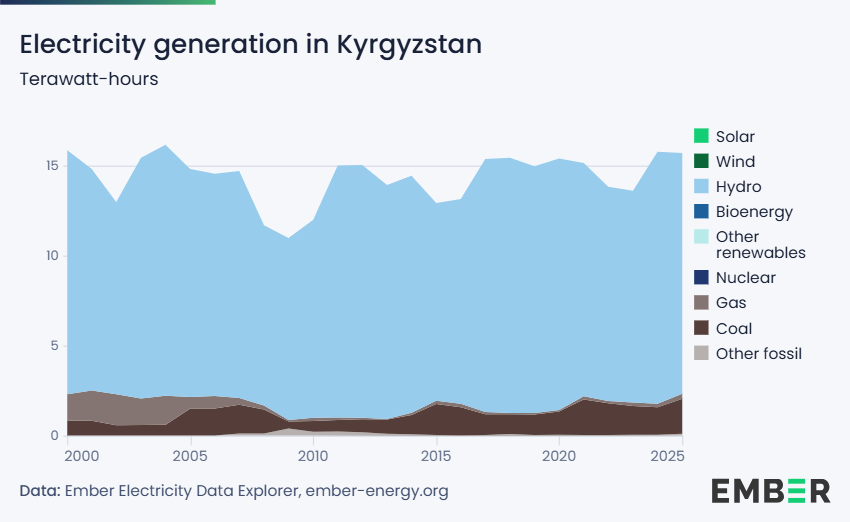
Electricity generation in Kyrgyzstan in terawatt-hours

Kyrgyzstan had a total primary energy supply (TPES) of 168 PJ in 2019, of which 37% from oil, 30% from hydropower and 26% from coal. The total electricity generation was 13.9 TWh (50 PJ), of which 92% came from hydroelectricity, the only significant renewable source in the country.

Hydroelectricity is generated by 7 large hydropower plants, all on the river Naryn, and 12 smaller hydropower plants, with a total installed capacity of 3.07 GW. The Kyrgyz government plans to expand the hydropower capacity by 4.6 GW with four main projects: Kambar-Ata-1, Upper Naryn cascade, Suusamyr-Kökömeren cascade and Kazarman cascade.
