= Arpa Valley =

Valley in Kyrgyzstan

- Location within Kyrgyzstan
- Floor elevation: 2,600–3,600 m (8,500–11,800 ft)
- Length: 60 km (37 mi) NW-SE
- Width: 32 km (20 mi) SW-NE

Geography
- Location: Kyrgyzstan, Naryn Region
- Coordinates: 40.70°N 74.87°E
- Rivers: Arpa
- Interactive map of Arpa Valley

The Arpa Valley (Kyrgyz: Арпа өрөөнү) is a high-altitude valley in the southwestern part of the inner Tien Shan. It is bordered by the Fergana Range to the southwest, the Torugart Range to the south, the At-Bashy Range to the east, Ortok Too to the northeast, and Jaman-Too to the north. The valley is approximately 60 km (37 mi) long and up to 32 km (20 mi) wide at its broadest point. Its elevation ranges between 2,600 m (8,500 ft) and 3,600 m (11,800 ft) above sea level.

== Hydrology ==
The valley is drained by the Arpa River, a tributary of the Ala-Buga. It divides the valley into two parts — a gently sloping wide left bank and a steeper, narrower right bank.

== Geology ==
The Arpa Valley is a graben-synclinal depression. Its floor is filled with thick layers of alluvial and weathered rocks.

== Landscapes ==
The Arpa Valley is characterized by the following landscape zones:

- Meadow and shrubby steppe (up to 3,000 m),
- On the south-facing slopes: subalpine semi-desert and dry steppe (up to 3,500 m),
- Alpine steppe,
- On the north-facing slopes: subalpine steppe and meadow steppe,
- Subnival zone (up to 3,800 m),
- And above that — glacial-nival landscapes.

== Climate ==
The climate is harsh: the average annual temperature is −5.4 °C, with January averaging −23 °C and July 9.3 °C. Annual precipitation ranges between 250 and 280 mm.

== Roads ==
The highway of international significance, ЭМ-11, as designated by the national road classification, connects Bishkek, Torugart, and the Kyrgyzstan-China border. The road passes through the eastern part of the Arpa Valley and is part of the European route E125 and Asian Highway 61 network in Kyrgyzstan.

== Historical description ==
In an account published in 1910, Douglas Carruthers described the view of the Arpa Valley from the Sur-tash Pass in the Fergana Range:

From the top of the Sur-tash pass, on the Ferghana range, a most instructive view was obtained over the plateau world to the east. Below was the Arpa "Pamir," a broad, undulating, grassy valley, with the Arpa river flowing through its centre. The Jaman Davan range, which borders the Arpa plateau on the north-east, on the north closes in and joins with the Ferghana range, thus enclosing the plateau. The Arpa river cuts through this range by a deep-cut gorge, the course of which is still dotted on the map, by an imaginary line.
