= Saymaluu-Tash =

Petroglyph site and national park in Kyrgyzstan

Saymaluu-Tash Nature Park
- Kyrgyz: Саймалуу-Таш мамлекеттик жаратылыш паркы
- IUCN category II (national park)
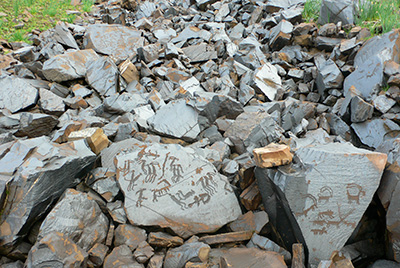
- Petroglyphs at Saymaluu-Tash

- Location within Kyrgyzstan Location within West and Central Asia
- Location: Toguz-Toro District, Jalal-Abad Region, Kyrgyzstan
- Coordinates: 41°11′N 73°49′E
- Area: 320.072 km^{2} (123.580 sq mi)
- Established: 2001

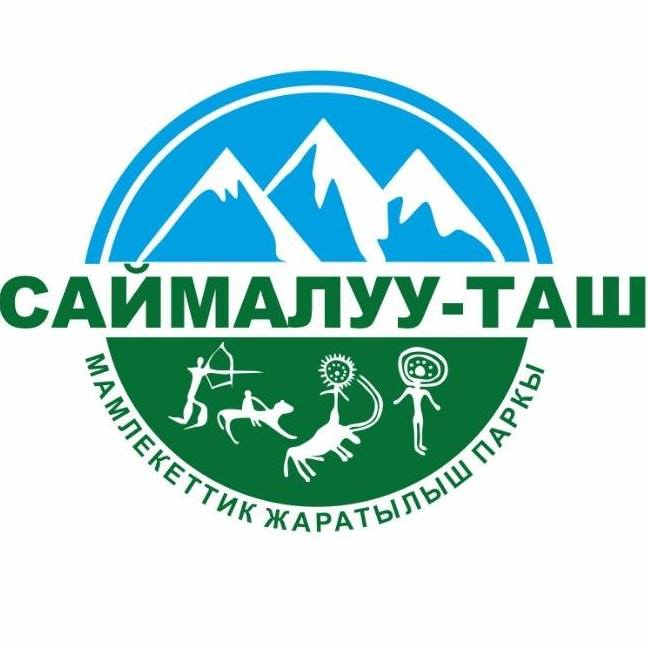
Logo of Saymaluu-Tash Nature Park.

Saymaluu-Tash (Kyrgyz: Саймалуу-Таш, in Russian Саймалы Таш, meaning 'embroidered' or 'patterned stones' in Kyrgyz) is a petroglyph site and a national park in Jalal-Abad Region, Kyrgyzstan, south of Kazarman. Over 10,000 stones bear pictures—perhaps as many as 98,000 pictures in all—which are black-and-white rock paintings, making the site a globally important collection of rock art. The pictures have been pecked into the near black or grey shiny desert varnish covering many rocks. Most pictures are from the Bronze Age (2500 - 900 BC) and show animals, humans and symbols. They may partly be seen as a sacred display of offerings of the ancient people of the lower valley.

== Protection ==
The site was proposed for listing under the UNESCO List of World Heritage Sites by the Kyrgyz National Commission for UNESCO on 29 January 2001. It is listed under the UNESCO's Tentative List as "Saimaly-Tash Petroglyphs" for inscription under Cultural Category under Criteria: (iii), (iv) and (vi). It is part of the larger Saymaluu-Tash Nature Park, which was established in May 2001, and covers 320.072 km^{2} (123.580 sq mi).

== Location ==
The petroglyph site is located in the Fergana Range at about 3,200 metres (10,500 ft) in two high valleys, separated by a low mountain ridge. The site is 30 kilometres (19 mi) away to the south of Kazarman. From Kazarman village for a short distance there is a road on which only off road vehicles can traverse but the rest of the way to the site can be reached in about a half day on foot or horseback, but only around the month of July. It is a strenuous climb. At other times, snow conditions make it impractical to reach. The trek involves three days by jeep and seven days by horse.

The nature park is crossed by a number of rivers that spring from the Fergana Range, including the Kyldoo, Kök-Art and Kongur-Döbö (Naryn basin).

== Etymology ==
The meaning of 'Saymaluu-Tash' in Kyrgyz language is "place of patterned or embroidered stone".

== History ==
The petroglyphs created in large galleries are thought to date from the early 3rd millennium BC to the Iron Age and up into the Middle Ages, though there are only a very few pictures from the Iron Age or Middle Ages. Exact dating of the rock art is controversial and only reliable from the first millennium BC with the arrival of the Saka-Scythian animal style. For the late Neolithic and then the Bronze Age many different styles are attested in Saimaluu Tash, one being the so called bitriangular style showing animals and humans with a wasp waist. The very specific bitriangular style may have been connected to a distinct ethnic group in the Ferghana valley. The site was sacred to the people of Tien Shan and Prehistoric Ferghana, and is even now sacred to the modern generation of Kyrgizians for spiritual and healing qualities. It is part of the spiritual ethos of the peoples' "religious beliefs and their worship of mountains, nature, totems and solar cosmic images". The site was first recognized by Russian cartographers in 1902 when they were carrying out surveys in the area for a road project to link a military camp between Jalal-Abad and Naryn; this road is now in use via Kazarman. One of the cartographers, Nikolai Khludov, who had heard tales from a shepherd of "painted stones" in close vicinity to their camp, decided to examine the site with a team of surveyors. He reported his findings of the petroglyphs to the Archaeological Society of Tashkent. This society then mounted an expedition to further examine the site. However, the site was forgotten until 1950. After an excavation was conducted, the petroglyphs were specifically identified, numbered and their age determined. It is now under sporadic investigation by the Institute of Archaeology in Bishkek. Neolithic age petroglyphs are on display in the Kyrgyz State Historical Museum.

== Features ==
Archaeologists have bifurcated the site, calling the parts "Saimaluu-Tash 1" and "Saimaluu-Tash 2".

Saimaluu-Tash 1, which extends over a length of 3 kilometres (1.9 mi), contains petroglyphs etched on stones covered by a dark grey desert varnish. Most stones are located in long flows of stones, i.e. ground moraines. There is a small lake here where shamans may have performed sacred rites. Petroglyphs of several designs at this site have been identified on stones. The most common designs are animals like ibex (the long-horned ibex of the Turkish era was more frequent), horses, lions, and wolves. Another common drawing is of hunting scenes of deer, with large antlers in particular; in these scenes the hunters are shown using bows, arrows, clubs and spears to hunt the animals. There are also fights between individual men or small groups depicted. The artists perhaps portrayed their feelings of gratitude to the spirits of the mountain after a good crop or a successful hunting expedition. Agricultural operation such as tilling the land was a common theme, though the alleged scenes with ploughs are seen by most rather as scenes with chariots, the chariots being reduced to two small wheels. Other scenes are of ritual dances, the sun, wavy designs representing the flow of rivers, and sexual scenes. There are Bronze Age pictures that show signs of an early sun cult with solar headed anthropomorphic figures. Many other stones show petroglyphs of chariots drawn mainly by bovines. The horse only began to play a role towards the end of the Bronze Age when people learned to ride horses effectively. An early Bronze Age bull cult with bulls showing elongated horns can be observed.

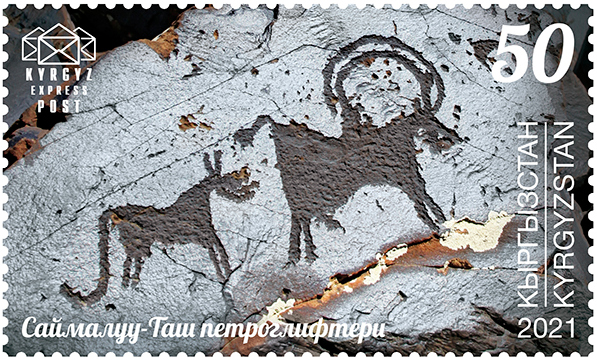

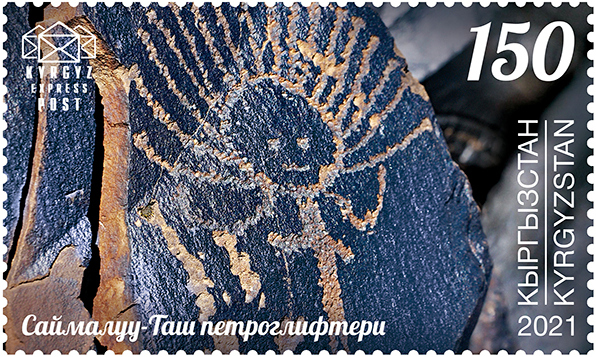

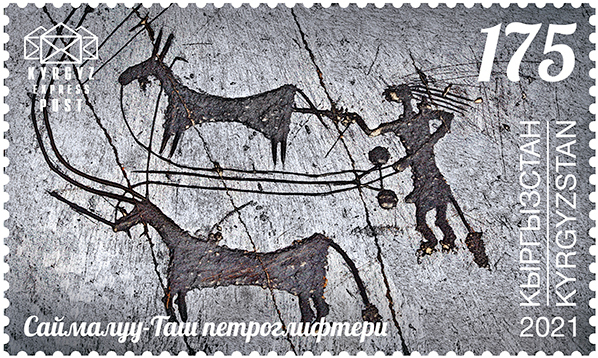

== Bibliography ==
- Clottes, Jean (2011). Rock Art in Central Asia - A Thematic Study. ISBN 978-2-918086-08-6.
- Mayhew, Bradley; Elliott, Mark; Masters, Tom; Noble, John (1 April 2014). Lonely Planet Central Asia. Lonely Planet Publications. ISBN 978-1-74300-078-6.
- Mitchell, Laurence (5 February 2015). Kyrgyzstan. Bradt Travel Guides. ISBN 978-1-84162-856-1.
- Reckel, Johannes (2022). Flying Deer and Sun Gods: Prehistoric Societies in Central Asian Rock Art. ISBN 978-3-945869-21-5.
- Reckel, Johannes (2024). Saimaluu Tash: Ancient Rock Art in the High Mountains of Kyrgyzstan. ISBN 978-3-96176-183-8.
