= Kökirim =

Kökirim River
- Native name: Kyrgyz: Көкирим

Location
- Country: Kyrgyzstan
- Region: Jalal-Abad Region
- District: Toguz-Toro District

Physical characteristics
- Source: Northeastern slopes of the Fergana Range
- Mouth: Naryn River
  - coordinates: 41°27′06″N 73°58′46″E
  - elevation: 1,240 m (4,070 ft)
- Length: 51 km (32 mi)
- Basin size: 1,740 km^{2} (670 sq mi)
- Discharge
  - average: 22.6 m^{3}/s (800 cu ft/s)

Basin features
- Progression: Naryn → Syr Darya → Aral Sea
- Main tributaries: Right: Kögart (50 km), Ürümbashy (40 km), Kekilikbel (39 km); Left: Kazyk (24 km), Baydamtal (21 km)

The Kökirim River (Kyrgyz: Көкирим) is a left tributary of the Naryn River in the Toguz-Toro District of the Jalal-Abad Region, Kyrgyzstan. It flows through the Toguz-Toro Valley and is one of the notable rivers of southern Kyrgyzstan.

== Geography ==
The Kökirim originates on the northeastern slopes of the Fergana Range and flows generally eastward through a narrow gorge in its upper course. The valley widens downstream, and the river turns northward before splitting into several branches near its lower reaches.

== Hydrology ==
The river is 51 km long, and its drainage basin covers an area of 1,740 km². It is mainly fed by snow (25%), glacier melt (20%), and springs (51%). The average annual discharge is about 22.6 m³/s, with the highest flow in June and the lowest in February. The river begins to rise in April and recedes by October.

== Tributaries ==
Major tributaries include:

- Right: Kögart (50 km), Ürümbashy (40 km), Kekilikbel (39 km)
- Left: Kazyk (24 km), Baydamtal (21 km)

== Use ==
The Kökirim River is primarily used for irrigation. Several villages are situated along its banks, including Kögirim, Aral, Birdik, and Atay.

== Etymology ==
The name Kökirim (also spelled Kökyrim) is of Turkic origin and consists of two elements:

- kök — “blue”, “sky”, or “azure” in Kyrgyz and Kazakh, also implying “clear” or “pure”;
- irim — a folk-geographical term widely found in Central Asian Turkic languages.

According to Murzaev, *irim* denotes a “deep pool, backwater, quiet reach, or slow-flowing stretch of a river” (*пучина, омут, плёс*). Konkaşpaev further identifies *irim* (and its variants *iris, irisu, irimäk*) as meaning “riverbed, meander, or quiet pool,” and notes its appearance in numerous hydronyms such as *Irtysh*, *Irgyz*, and *Kökirim*.

Hence, the hydronym Kökirim may be interpreted as “blue (or clear) pool,” “blue bend,” or “calm stretch of the river.” The name likely refers to the river’s clear water and gentle, meandering course through the Toguz-Toro valley.

== See also ==
- List of rivers of Kyrgyzstan
- Naryn River
