= Makmal =

- Native name: Макмал (Kyrgyz)

Location
- Country: Kyrgyzstan
- Region: Naryn Region, Jalal-Abad Region
- District: Ak-Talaa District, Toguz-Toro District

Physical characteristics
- Source: Toguz-Toro District
- Mouth: Ala-Buga
  - location: Ak-Talaa District
  - coordinates: 41°13′43.70″N 74°27′44″E
  - elevation: 1,817 m (5,961 ft)
- Length: 41 km (25 mi)
- Basin size: 441 km^{2} (170 sq mi)

Basin features
- Progression: Ala-Buga→ Naryn→ Syr Darya→ North Aral Sea

The Makmal (Kyrgyz: Макмал) is a river in Ak-Talaa District of Naryn Region and Toguz-Toro District of Jalal-Abad Region of Kyrgyzstan. It is a left tributary of the Ala-Buga. The length of the river is 41 km (25 mi), its basin area is 441 square kilometers, and its average annual discharge is 1.8 - 2.5 cubic meters per second.
