= Makmal gold mine =

Gold mine in Jalal-Abad Province, Kyrgyzstan

Makmal mine
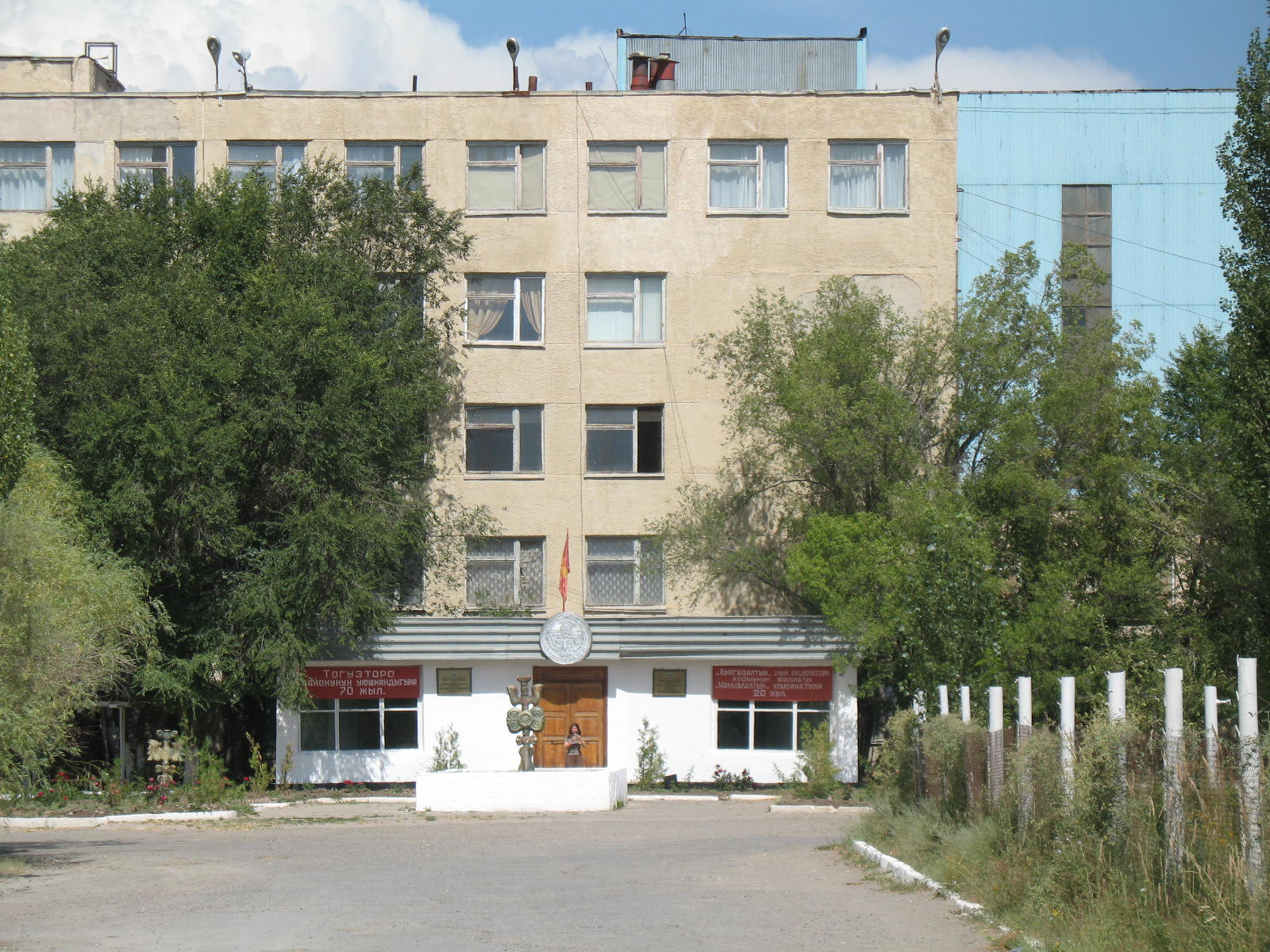
- The entrance to the mining facility at Mamkmalaltyn
- Interactive map of Makmal mine
- Location: Jalal-Abad Province, Kyrgyzstan; 41.1825°N 73.9552°E
- Products: Gold
- Company: Gold Fields

The Makmal gold mine is an open-pit gold mine in Toguz-Toro District, Jalal-Abad Region, Kyrgyzstan, just to the south of Kazarman. It was the largest gold mine in the Soviet Union.

The mine is currently run by the Makmal gold mining combine, or Makmalaltyn (Kyrgyz: Макмалалтын), a branch of Kyrgyzaltyn (a publicly traded company), and has an output of close to 1.2 tonnes of gold per year.
