= Alabuga =

Alabuga may refer to:

- Yelabuga, a town in the Republic of Tatarstan, Russia
- Alabuga Special Economic Zone, in the Republic of Tatarstan, Russia
- Ala-Buga, a river in Kyrgyzstan
