= Fedor Ovchinnikov =

Soviet nuclear engineer and energy official

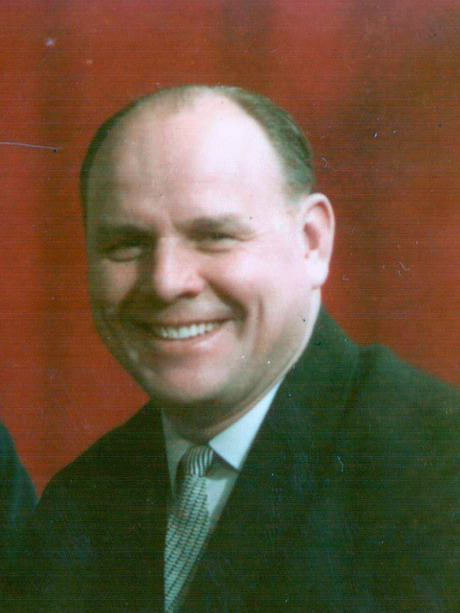
- Ovchinnikov in the 1970s

Deputy Minister of Energy and Electrification of the USSR
- In office 1978–1982
- Premier: Alexei Kosygin, Nikolai Tikhonov

Personal details
- Born: 18 February 1925 Karaulovo, Ryazan Governorate, RSFSR, USSR
- Died: 1 July 1994 (aged 69) Moscow, Russia
- Education: Moscow Power Engineering Institute
- Profession: Nuclear engineer
- Awards: Hero of Socialist Labour (1974); USSR State Prize (1967); Order of Lenin; Order of the Red Banner of Labour; Order of the Badge of Honour

Fedor Yakovlevich Ovchinnikov (Russian: Фёдор Яковлевич Овчинников; 18 February 1925 – 1 July 1994) was a Soviet engineer, energy official, and nuclear power expert. He served as Deputy Minister, Ministry of Energy and Electrification of the USSR, was the first director of the Novovoronezh Nuclear Power Plant, and later General Director of the international consortium Interatomenergo.

== Biography ==
=== Early life ===
Fedor Ovchinnikov was born in the village of Karaulovo in Ryazan Governorate, RSFSR. In 1931, his family moved to Moscow. During World War II, his father served in the Red Army, while Fedor worked as an electrician and studied at night school. In 1948, he graduated from the Moscow Power Engineering Institute (MPEI) with a degree in electrical engineering.

=== Early career in nuclear industry ===
After graduation, he was assigned to the secret Mayak facility (Plant No. 21) in Chelyabinsk Oblast, where he worked on launching the USSR's first industrial nuclear reactor. He later became director of Reactor Plant No. 156, where he supervised the development of several reactors producing weapons-grade plutonium.

=== Novovoronezh Nuclear Power Plant ===
In 1963, Ovchinnikov was appointed the first director of the Novovoronezh Nuclear Power Plant. He led the commissioning of multiple VVER reactors, including the world's first VVER-210, and oversaw the launch of the prototype VVER-1000. His leadership made the station a model for nuclear plants in Eastern Europe and beyond. In 1967, he received the USSR State Prize. The Novovoronezh plant became the testbed for Soviet nuclear technology, and its experience influenced nuclear construction both within the USSR and abroad. He authored several books and scientific papers on nuclear power plant operation, including "Operational Modes of Pressurized Water Reactors" (1988). In 1978 he authored a presentation on Novovoronezh Atomic Power Plants at an international conference as F. Ya. Ovchinnikov.

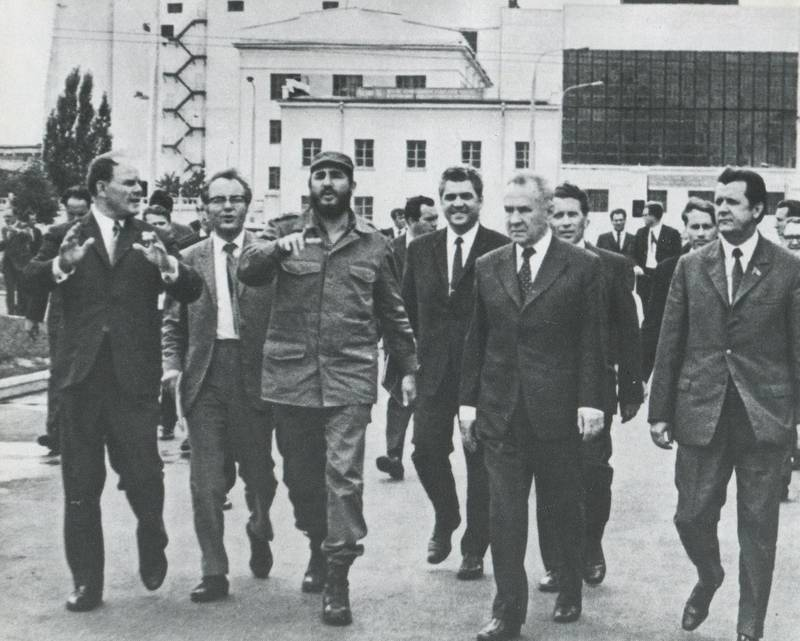
Ovchinnikov F. Ya. conducting a tour for Fidel Castro at the Novovoronezh Nuclear Power Plant (1972)

=== Deputy Minister of Energy ===
From 1978 to 1982, Ovchinnikov served as Deputy Minister of Energy and Electrification. He played a leading role in the development of Soviet nuclear power infrastructure, including the commissioning of plants in Kursk, Kola, and Ukraine. In early 1982, Fyodor Ovchinnikov told Tass that 27 nuclear power plants with over 15 million kW capacity were operational. He was also instrumental in founding Interatomenergo to promote nuclear cooperation among socialist countries. In addition to his professional duties, Ovchinnikov authored numerous publications and technical manuals on nuclear power engineering. His most well-known work is the co-authored book Operating Conditions for Pressurized Water Nuclear Power Reactors (1979) , a widely used reference in Soviet VVER-type nuclear power plants and engineering institutes.

=== Later life and legacy ===
After stepping down due to health reasons, Ovchinnikov remained active in the nuclear sector, leading Interatomenergo until 1993. He died in Moscow in 1994 and was buried at Kuntsevo Cemetery.

== Personal life ==
Ovchinnikov was married to Lidiya Pospelova; they had one son, Sergey, who also worked in the nuclear sector.

== Legacy ==
- Hero of Socialist Labor (1974)
- USSR State Prize (1967)
- Honored Energy Worker of the RSFSR (1970)
- Recipient of the Order of Lenin, Order of the Red Banner of Labor, and Order of the Badge of Honor
- Honorary citizen of Novovoronezh
- A bust was inaugurated in his honor in Novovoronezh in 2002
- Annual youth sports competitions are held in his name

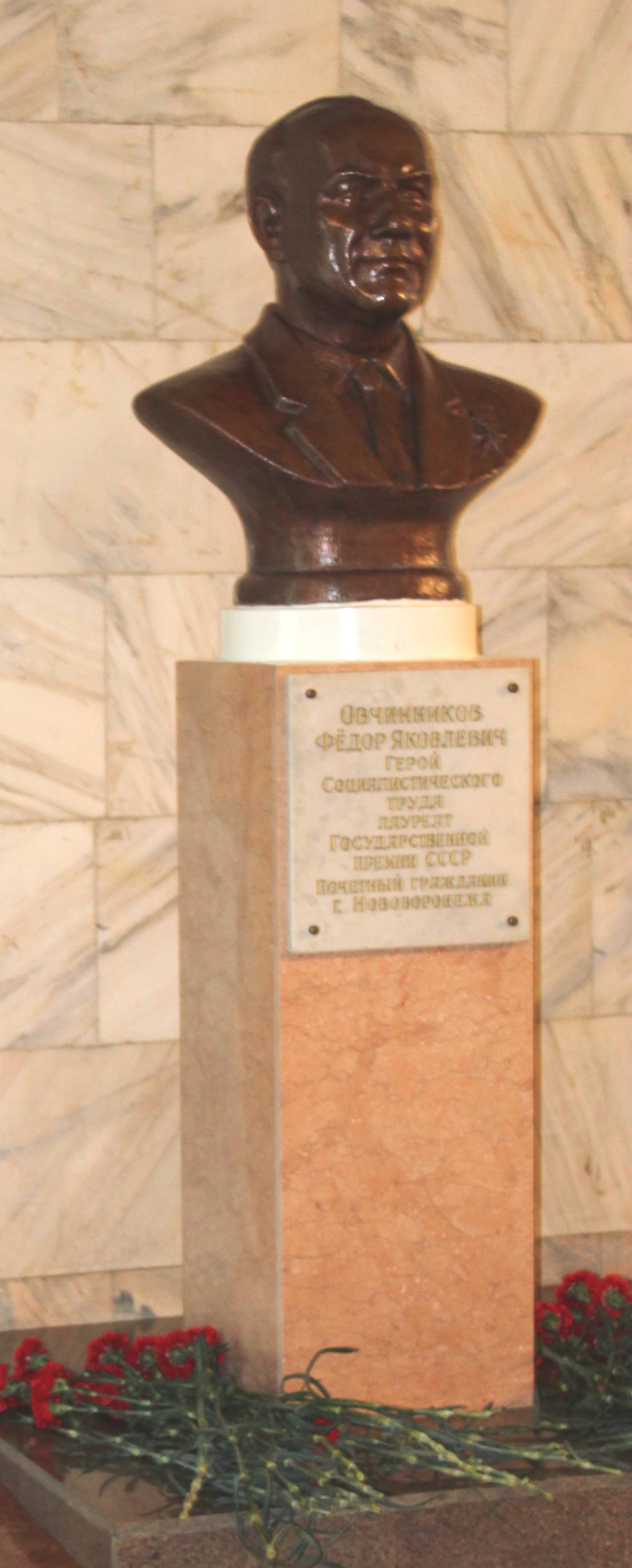
Bust of F. Ya. Ovchinnikov in Novovoronezh

== See also ==
- Novovoronezh Nuclear Power Plant
- Soviet nuclear program
