= Koshbulak =

Koshbulak may refer to:

- Koshbulak, Sulukta - an urban-type settlement in Batken Region of Kyrgyzstan
- Kosh-Bulak, Jalal-Abad - a village in Jalal-Abad Region of Kyrgyzstan.
