= Kazarman hydropower cascade =

- Approximate location in Kyrgyzstan
- Official name: Казарман ГЭСтер каскады (Kyrgyz); Казарманский каскад ГЭС (Russian)
- Country: Kyrgyzstan
- Location: Jalal-Abad Region
- Coordinates: 41°35′N 73°56′E
- Status: Under construction
- Built by: İhlas Holding

Dam and spillways
- Impounds: Naryn

Power Station
- Installed capacity: 912 MW

The Kazarman hydropower cascade (Kyrgyz: Казарман ГЭСтер каскады, Russian: Казарманский каскад ГЭС) is a series of hydroelectric power stations under construction near Kazarman in Jalal-Abad Region, Kyrgyzstan. When completed, the cascade will comprise three hydroelectric power stations on the Naryn River, which are the Ala-Buga, Kara-Bulung-1, and Kara-Bulung-2, with a combined installed capacity of 912 MW.

== History ==
Plans to develop the Kazarman hydropower cascade date to the Soviet period. Studies examining the feasibility of constructing hydroelectric power stations in the area were carried out, including by JSC Hydroproject, from around 1990. Following the dissolution of the Soviet Union and the ensuing economic difficulties, construction for the project did not start.

In 2023, the government of Kyrgyzstan signed a memorandum of understanding with a consortium of Chinese companies for the development of the cascade, which was then estimated to cost between US$2.4 billion and US$3 billion. The proposal formed part of efforts to increase domestic electricity generation amid seasonal shortages, which resulted in having to import electricity from Russia and Turkmenistan.

In 2026, the development of the cascade was instead awarded to Turkish conglomerate İhlas Holding. The revised development is estimated to cost approximately US$3 billion and is scheduled for completion in 2031. Electricity generated by the cascade is intended to supply domestic demand, with surplus generation potentially exported to neighbouring countries.

Earlier proposals envisaged a combined installed capacity of 1160 MW and included the 248 MW Toguz-Toro Hydro Power Plant as part of the development. The Toguz-Toro Hydro Power Plant was subsequently excluded from the scope awarded to Ihlas Holding, reducing the planned total capacity of the cascade to 912 MW.

== Design ==
Under the current proposal, the Kazarman hydropower cascade comprises three hydroelectric power stations: Ala-Buga (Ала-Буга ГЭСи), Kara-Bulung-1 (Кара-Булуң-1 ГЭСи), and Kara-Bulung-2 (Кара-Булуң-2 ГЭСи) with an individual planned capacity of 600 MW, 149 MW, and 163 MW respectively. These three power plants are located sequentially along the Naryn River, beginning downstream of its confluence with the Ala-Buga River. The Ala-Buga plant would be the largest of the three developments, with its dam planned to exceed 235 m (771 ft) in height. The proposed layout of the Ala-Buga plant has also been described to be broadly similar to that of the Kambarata-1 plant.
