= Shamaldy-Say, Nooken =

Shamaldy-Say Шамалды-Сай
- Location within Kyrgyzstan
- Coordinates: 41°10′19″N 72°11′10″E
- Country: Kyrgyzstan
- Region: Jalal-Abad
- District: Nooken

Population (2021)
  - Total: 6,526
- Time zone: UTC+6

Shamaldy-Say (Kyrgyz: Шамалды-Сай) is a village in Jalal-Abad Region of Kyrgyzstan. It is part of Nooken District. It lies adjacent to the urban-type settlement Shamaldy-Say, which is part of the city Tash-Kömür, and close to the border with Uzbekistan. Its population was 6,526 in 2021.

== Population ==
Historical population
Year	Pop.	±% p.a.
2009	4,282	—
2021	6,526	+3.57%
Note: resident population; Sources:
