= Upper Naryn hydropower cascade =

Hydroelectric power stations in Kyrgyzstan

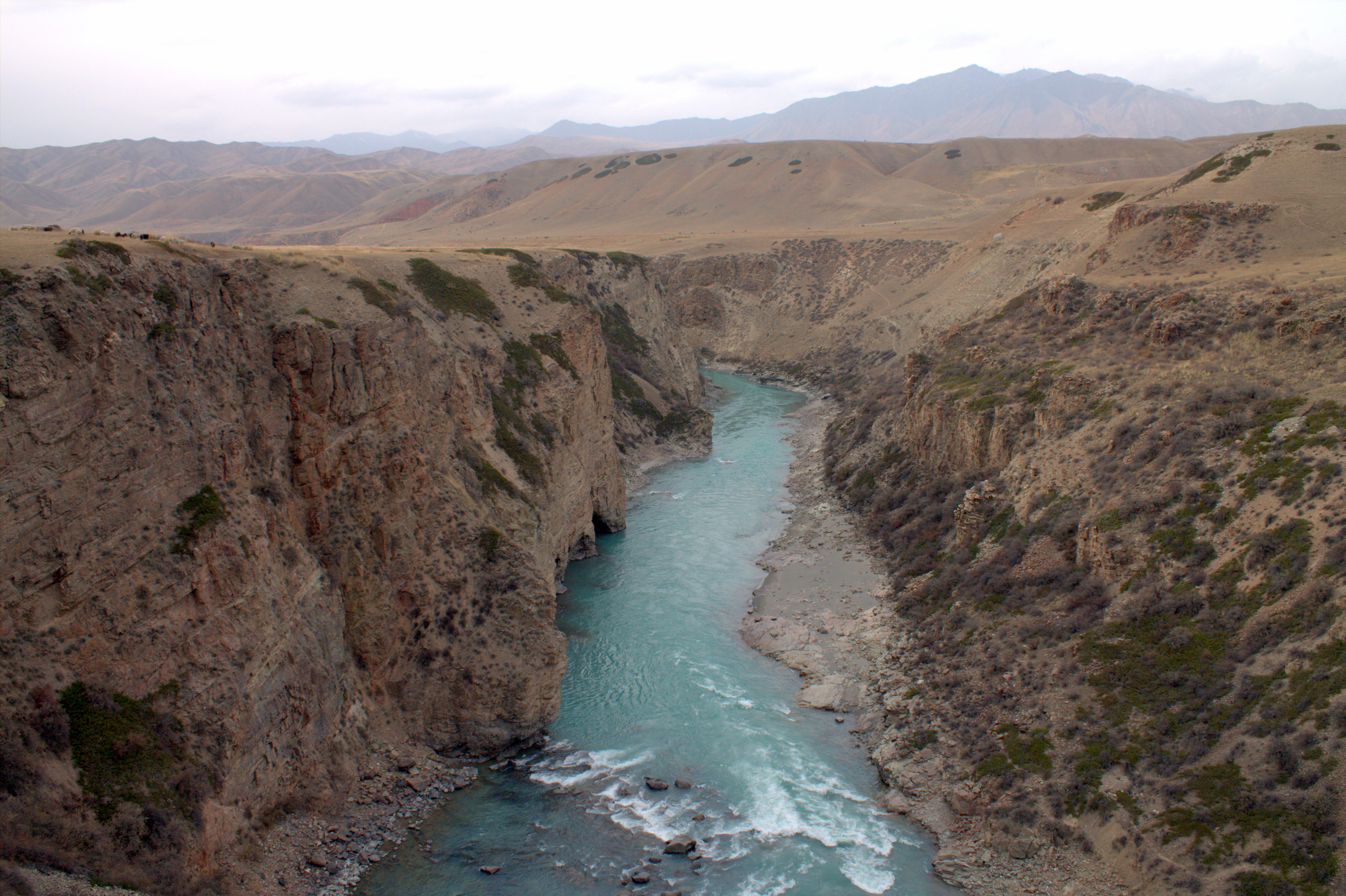

- Approximate location in Kyrgyzstan
- Official name: Жогорку Нарын ГЭСтер каскады (Kyrgyz); Верхне-Нарынский каскад ГЭС (Russian)
- Country: Kyrgyzstan
- Location: Naryn Region
- Coordinates: 41°27′N 76°17′E
- Status: Under construction

Dam and spillways
- Impounds: Naryn

Power Station
- Installed capacity: 237.7 MW

The Upper Naryn hydropower cascade (Kyrgyz: Жогорку Нарын ГЭСтер каскады, Russian: Верхне-Нарынский каскад ГЭС) is a series of partially constructed hydroelectric power stations in Naryn Region, Kyrgyzstan. When completed, the cascade will comprise four hydroelectric power stations on the Naryn River, which are the Ak-Bulung, Naryn-1, Naryn-2, and Naryn-3, with a combined installed capacity of 237.7 MW.

== History ==
The earliest studies into the hydroelectric development of the Upper Naryn date back to the Soviet period in the 1960s, when preliminary plans identified the potential construction of a 55 MW Ak-Bulung and a 150 MW Naryn Hydroelectric Power Station. A later design expanded the proposed cascade to six power stations, including the Oruktama (Оруктамская ГЭС) and Dzhanykel (Джаныкельская ГЭС), with planned capacities of 100 MW and 130 MW respectively. Both plants were subsequently omitted from the cascade.

Construction was started, suspended, and resumed on several occasions. In September 2012, construction of the cascade began following an agreement between Russia and Kyrgyzstan. The agreement led to the establishment of "Verkhne-Narynskiye GES", a joint venture between the Russian company RusHydro and the Kyrgyz state-owned company OJSC Electric Stations. The cascade was expected to be completed in stages between 2016 and 2019. However, work was suspended in 2015 amid financial difficulties at RusHydro, and in December 2015 the Kyrgyz government decided to terminate the agreement.

On 10 July 2017, the Kyrgyz government signed an agreement with the Czech company Liglass Trading for the development of the Ak-Bulung and Naryn-1 hydroelectric power stations. Despite concerns over the company's lack of previous experience in hydropower construction, Liglass was required under the agreement to provide US$ 37 million to acquire the Russian's 50% stake in the project. The agreement was terminated in September 2017 after the company failed to provide the required funds.

In 2023, Kyrgyzstan signed a memorandum of understanding with the British company Minddock Limited, concerning the possible development of the cascade. Minddock also lacked previous experience in hydropower construction. The agreement was subsequently terminated, after the company too failed to fulfill its obligation. The project has since remained stalled while Kyrgyzstan continues to seek investors for its completion.

== Design ==
In its current configuration, the Upper Naryn hydropower cascade comprises four hydroelectric power stations: Ak-Bulung (Ак-Булуң ГЭСи), Naryn-1 (Нарын ГЭС-1), Naryn-2 (Нарын ГЭС-2), and Naryn-3 (Нарын ГЭС-3) with an individual planned capacity of 87.4 MW, 47.7 MW, 47.6 MW, and 55 MW respectively. These four power plants are located sequentially along the Naryn River, beginning downstream of its confluence with the Kichi-Naryn River. The Ak-Bulung plant would be the largest of the four developments, with a planned dam height of 75 m (246 ft).
