= Karl Marks, Jalal-Abad =

Karl Marks Карл Маркс
- Location within Kyrgyzstan
- Coordinates: 41°19′0″N 73°49′30″E
- Country: Kyrgyzstan
- Region: Jalal-Abad
- District: Toguz-Toro

Population (2021)
  - Total: 724
- Time zone: UTC+6

Karl Marks (Kyrgyz: Карл Маркс) is a village in Jalal-Abad Region of Kyrgyzstan. It is part of the Toguz-Toro District. Its population was 724 in 2021.
