= Üch-Korgon Hydroelectric Power Station =

Hydroelectric power station in Kyrgyzstan

Üch-Korgon Hydro Power Plant
- Official name: Үч-Коргон ГЭСи (Kyrgyz); Уч-Курганская ГЭС (Russian)
- Country: Kyrgyzstan
- Location: Shamaldy-Say
- Coordinates: 41°11′16″N 72°09′38″E
- Status: Operational
- Commission date: 1961–1962
- Operator: OJSC Electric Stations

Thermal power station
- Primary fuel: Hydropower

Power generation
- Units operational: 4
- Nameplate capacity: 216 MW

The Üch-Korgon Hydro Power Plant (Kyrgyz: Үч-Коргон ГЭСи, Russian: Уч-Курганская ГЭС) is a hydroelectric power station on the Naryn River in Shamaldy-Say, Kyrgyzstan. Launched in four phases between 1961 and 1962, it is located upstream from Uchqoʻrgʻon in Uzbekistan. The plant is operated by OJSC Electric Stations (Электр станциялар ААК), which employees around 700 staff in the operation of the plant and two other hydroelectric power stations that together form the "Cascade of Tash-Kömür" hydroelectric power stations development.

== History ==
Construction of the power station began in 1956 during the Soviet period. It was built as the first of three power stations in the "Cascade of Tash-Kömür" along the Naryn River, that also included of the Tash-Kömür and Shamaldy-Say hydroelectric power stations. Construction of the hydroelectric facilities along the river was undertaken by OJSC Narynhydroenergostroy (Нарын гидроэнергия курулуш ААК), according to JSC Hydroproject designs. The plant's first hydroelectric generating unit was launched on 30 December 1961, followed by the second on 3 June 1962, the third on 7 September 1962, and the last on 5 November 1962. The plant initially had a design capacity of 180 MW, with each of its four generating turbine rated at 45 MW. The power station was officially commissioned in June 1964.

During the Soviet period, the plant was managed by Kirgizglavenergo under the centralised supervision of the Ministry of Energy and Electrification of the Soviet Union. Following the independence of Kyrgyzstan, management was transferred to state owned JSC Kyrgyzenergo. After Kyrgyzenergo was reorganised in 2001, operation of the plant was transferred to OJSC Electric Stations.

In 2024, the first major rehabilitation of the power station began, aimed at improving the condition of its ageing equipment and increasing its generating capacity. The upgrade is expected to increase the capacity of each generating turbine unit by 9 MW. The works are estimated to cost US$160 million, with US$100 million in financing provided by the Asian Development Bank, and US$45 million by the Eurasian Development Bank, with the remaining cost funded by the Kyrgyz government. The works are expected to be completed in 2026.

== Design ==
The Üch-Korgon Hydro Power Plant is equipped with four individual turbine each with a nominal output of around 54 MW, giving the station a total nominal capacity of 216 MW. The power plant's dam is 56 m (184 ft) high, and forms a reservoir with a total storage capacity of 53 million m^{3}, of which 21 million m^{3} is usable for power generation.
