= Kazarman =

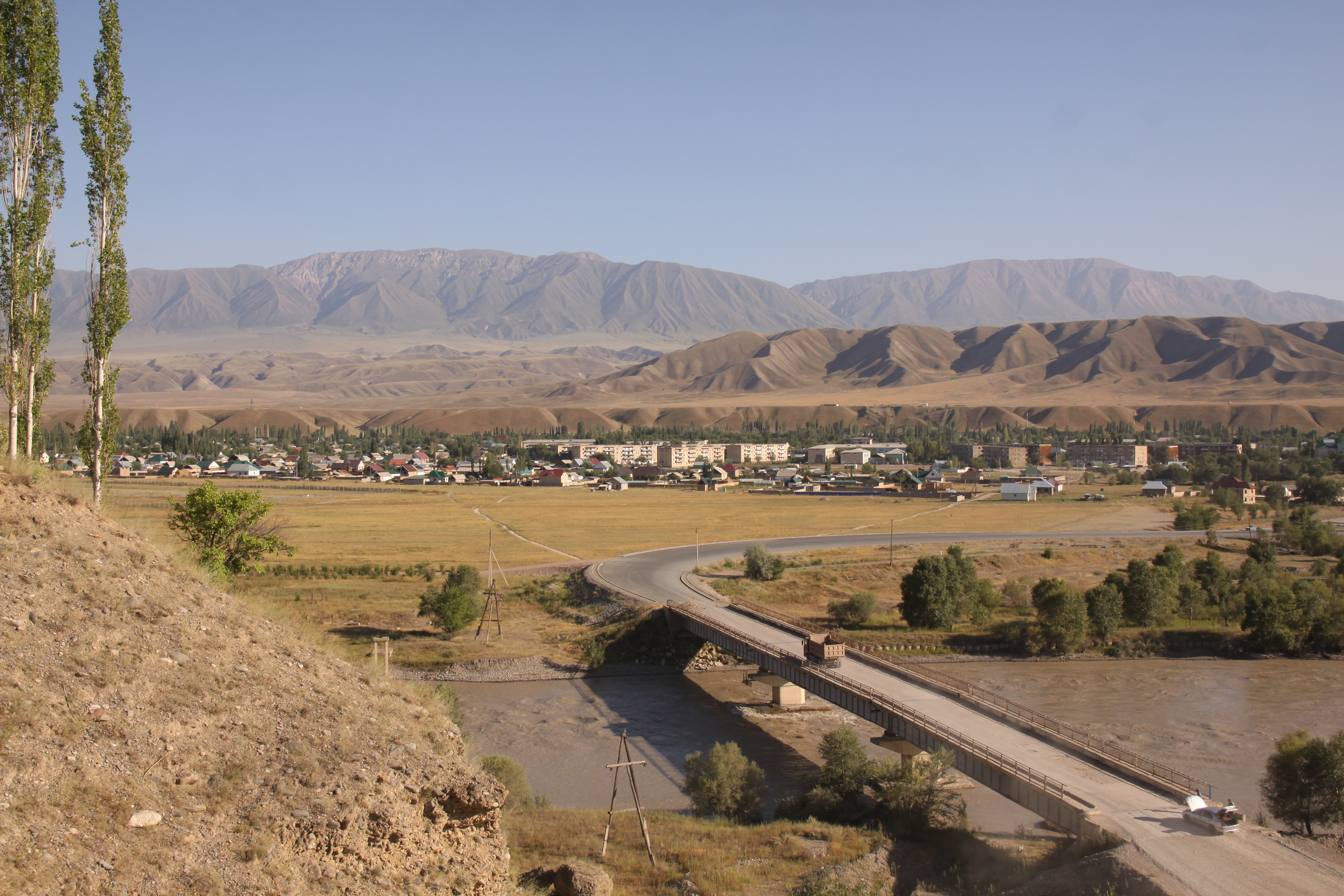

- Location within Kyrgyzstan
- Coordinates: 41°24′0″N 74°3′0″E
- Country: Kyrgyzstan
- Region: Jalal-Abad Region
- District: Toguz-Toro District
- Elevation: 1,310 m (4,300 ft)

Population (2021)
  - Total: 11,191
- Time zone: UTC+6

Kazarman is the village and capital of Toguz-Toro District, Jalal-Abad Region, Kyrgyzstan on the river Naryn. Its population was 11,191 in 2021.

According to one source, "this poor dust-blown settlement in northern Jalal-Abad Region has something of the sinister reputation of a tough mining town down on its luck". The Makmal open-pit gold mine just to the south no longer provides employment opportunities. The town is largely cut off in winter when the roads are closed by snow. The small Kazarman Airport is currently (2012) not served by any flights. The road southwest to Jalal-Abad city normally requires a four-wheel drive as far as the Kaldama Pass over the Ferghana range. Once over the pass, the country opens out to the Ferghana Valley. The road east through Baetov and Dostuk to Naryn is somewhat less harrowing.

The village is a base for visiting Saimaluu Tash.

== Population ==
Historical population
Year	Pop.	±% p.a.
2009	9,486	—
2021	11,191	+1.39%
Note: resident population; Sources:

== See also ==
- Karabulun Hydro Power Plant
