= Kongorchok =

Kongorchok Коӊорчок
- Location within Kyrgyzstan
- Coordinates: 41°15′3″N 74°35′59″E
- Country: Kyrgyzstan
- Region: Naryn Region
- District: Ak-Talaa District
- Elevation: 1,800 m (5,900 ft)

Population (2021)
  - Total: 1,555
- Time zone: UTC+6

Kongorchok (Kyrgyz: Коӊорчок, Russian: Конорчок - Konorchok) is a village in Ak-Talaa District, Naryn Region, Kyrgyzstan. It is situated near the right bank of the river Ala-Buga. Its population was 1,555 in 2021.
