= Kyzyl-Jar, Tash-Kömür =

Kyzyl-Jar Кызыл-Жар
- urban-type settlement
- Location in Kyrgyzstan
- Coordinates: 41°16′14″N 72°00′23″E
- Country: Kyrgyzstan
- Region: Jalal-Abad Region
- Town: Tash-Kömür

Population (2021)
  - Total: 3,340
- Time zone: UTC+6 (KGT)

Kyzyl-Jar (Kyrgyz: Кызыл-Жар) is an urban-type settlement in Jalal-Abad Region, Kyrgyzstan. The town is administratively subordinated to the town Tash-Kömür. Its population was 3,340 in 2021.

== Population ==
Historical population
Year	Pop.	±% p.a.
1970	1,580	—
1979	3,201	+8.16%
1989	3,781	+1.68%
1999	3,919	+0.36%
2009	2,620	−3.95%
2021	3,340	+2.04%
Note: resident population; Sources:
