= Kirov Reservoir =

Dam in Talas Province, Kyrgyzstan

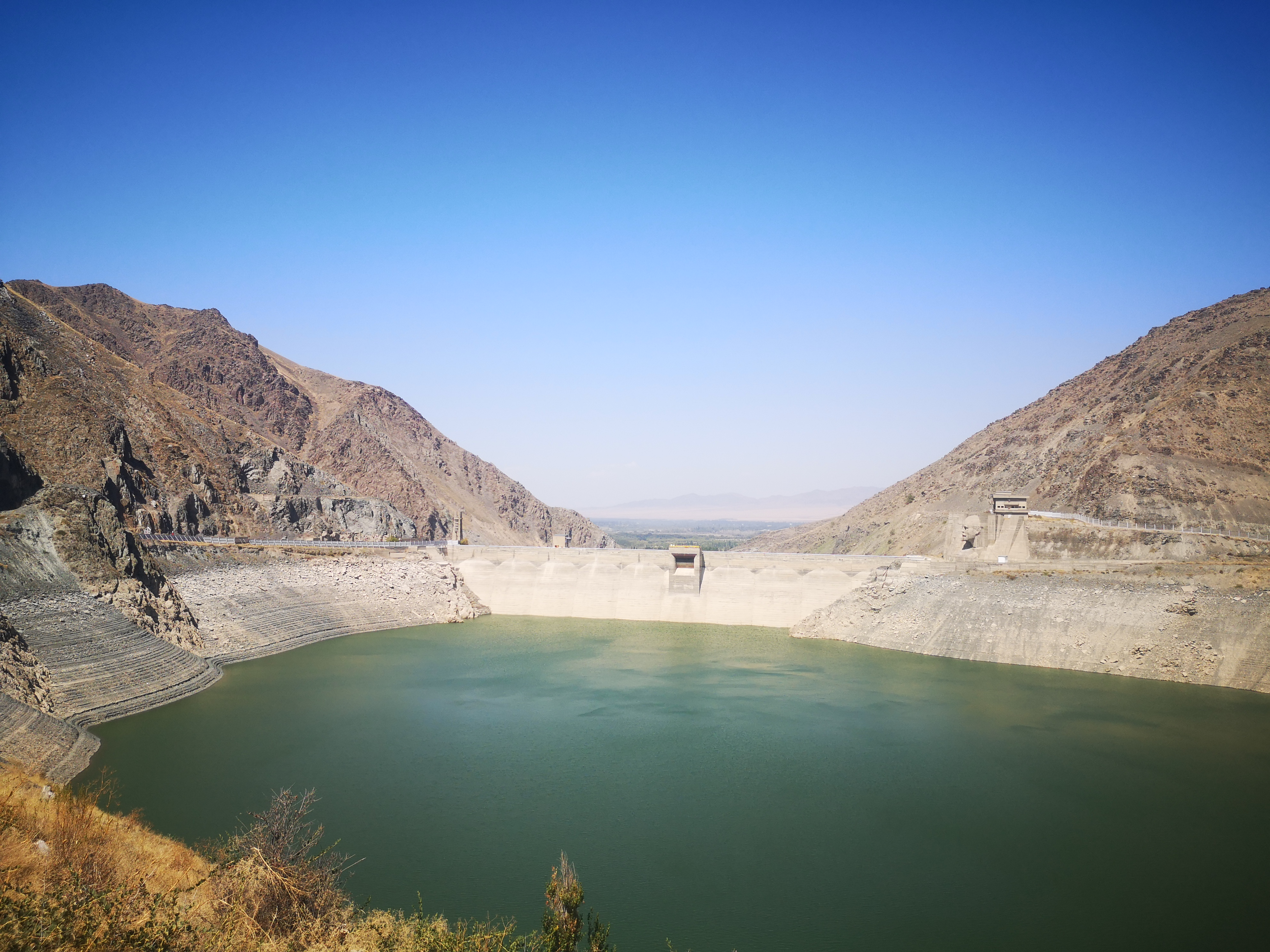

- Location within Kyrgyzstan
- Official name: Киров суу сактагычы (Kyrgyz); Кировское водохранилище (Russian)
- Location: Manas District, Talas Province, Kyrgyz Republic
- Coordinates: 42°38′20″N 71°38′40″E
- Construction began: 1965
- Opening date: 1976

Dam and spillways
- Type of dam: Concrete
- Impounds: Talas River
- Height: 86 m (282 ft)
- Length: 257 m (843 ft)

Reservoir
- Creates: Kirov Reservoir; Киров суу сактагычы
- Total capacity: 550,000,000 m^{3} (1.9×10^{10} cu ft)
- Active capacity: 540,000,000 m^{3} (1.9×10^{10} cu ft)
- Surface area: 27 km^{2} (10 sq mi)

Kirov Reservoir (Kyrgyz: Киров суу сактагычы, romanized: Kirov Suu Saktagychy, Russian: Кировское водохранилище) is a reservoir on the Talas River in Manas District, Talas Province, northwestern Kyrgyzstan. The reservoir has a total storage capacity of approximately 550 million cubic metres and a surface area of about 27 km². The reservoir is primarily used for irrigation and regulation of the Talas River. Water released from the reservoir supports agricultural areas within the Talas Valley and further downstream in Kazakhstan.

== History ==
Construction of the Kirov Reservoir and its dam was undertaken by JSC Kyrgyzsuudolboor (Кыргызсуудолбоор ААК) and began in 1965. The development formed part of the Soviet's efforts to expand irrigation infrastructure in the Talas Valley. During the construction, the villages of Kirovskoye and Beysheke were relocated further upstream. About 400 families were resettled, while construction workers and specialists were brought to the nearby villages of Kyzyl-Zhyldyz and Chon-Kapka, where supporting facilities were established.

The dam was the first lightweight buttress concrete dam constructed in the Soviet Union, with its design selected in response to the seismic conditions of the region. Construction of the reservoir was substantially completed by 1975, and the dam was opened in 1976.

Following the dissolution of the Soviet Union, the reservoir acquired a transboundary role, because the Talas River flows from Kyrgyzstan into Kazakhstan. Water stored in the reservoir is consequently used for agricultural irrigation in both countries. In 2000, Kyrgyzstan and Kazakhstan signed a United Nations brokered agreement on the shared use of water management facilities on the Chu and Talas Rivers. This subsequently led to the establishment of the July 2008 "Commission on the Use of the Water Management Facilities" between both countries, which was responsible for coordinating the joint use and maintenance of the countries' shared water infrastructure.

== Monuments ==
The reservoir is also notable for its surviving Soviet era monumental artworks. One side of the dam features a bas-relief portrait of Vladimir Lenin, while the other contains a series of large scale artworks depicting scenes of everyday life. Created between 1975 and 1983 by prominent Soviet artists including, Viktor Shestopal, Teodor Gertsen, and Viktor Dimov, the works form part of the complex's Soviet period architectural and artistic composition.

== See also ==
- List of dams and reservoirs in Kyrgyzstan
