= Tash-Kömür Hydroelectric Power Station =

Kyrgyzstani hydroelectric power plant

Tash-Kömür Hydro Power Plant
- Official name: Таш-Көмүр ГЭСи (Kyrgyz); Таш-Кумырская ГЭС (Russian)
- Country: Kyrgyzstan
- Location: Tash-Kömür
- Coordinates: 41°24′13″N 72°13′55″E
- Status: Operational
- Commission date: 1985–1987
- Operator: OJSC Electric Stations

Thermal power station
- Primary fuel: Hydropower

Power generation
- Units operational: 3
- Nameplate capacity: 450 MW

The Tash-Kömür Hydro Power Plant (Kyrgyz: Таш-Көмүр ГЭСи, Russian: Таш-Кумырская ГЭС) is a hydroelectric power station on the Naryn River at Tash-Kömür, Kyrgyzstan. Launched in three phases between 1985 and 1987, it is located 18 km downstream from the Kürpsay Hydroelectric Power Station. The plant is operated by OJSC Electric Stations (Электр станциялар ААК), which employees around 700 staff in the operation of the plant and two other hydroelectric power stations that together form the "Cascade of Tash-Kömür" hydroelectric power stations development.

== History ==
Construction of the power station began in 1981 during the Soviet period. It was built as the second of three power stations in the "Cascade of Tash-Kömür" along the Naryn River, that also included the Üch-Korgon and Shamaldy-Say hydroelectric power stations. Construction of the hydroelectric facilities along the river was undertaken by OJSC Narynhydroenergostroy (Нарын гидроэнергия курулуш ААК). The plant's first hydroelectric generating unit was launched on 22 December 1985, followed by the second on 30 August 1986, and the third on 30 September 1987. The plant reached its design capacity in 2001.

During the Soviet period, the plant was managed by Kirgizglavenergo under the centralised supervision of the Ministry of Energy and Electrification of the Soviet Union. Following the independence of Kyrgyzstan, management was transferred to state owned JSC Kyrgyzenergo. After Kyrgyzenergo was reorganised in 2001, operation of the plant was transferred to OJSC Electric Stations.

Although the power station had reached its design capacity in 2001, it was not officially considered completed until 2017, when a further KGS 102 million was spent to complete installation and electrical works. Generators, transformers, and communications equipment in the plant have also undergone replacement or modernisation over the years, partly to address deficiencies in the original equipment and to also accommodate increased demand on the electricity grid during the winter months.

== Design ==
The Tash-Kömür Hydro Power Plant is equipped with three individual turbine each with a nominal output of around 150 MW, giving the station a total nominal capacity of 450 MW. The power plant's dam is 75 m (246 ft) high, and forms a reservoir with a total storage capacity of about 144 million m^{3}, of which approximately 10 million m^{3} is usable for power generation.
