= On-Archa =

- Native name: Он-Арча (Kyrgyz)

Location
- Country: Kyrgyzstan
- Region: Naryn Region
- District: Naryn District

Physical characteristics
- Mouth: Naryn
  - coordinates: 41.4576°N 75.8290°E
- Length: 75 km (47 mi)
- Basin size: 1,570 km^{2} (610 sq mi)

Basin features
- Progression: Naryn→ Syr Darya→ North Aral Sea

The On-Archa (Kyrgyz: Он-Арча) is a river in Naryn District of Naryn Region of Kyrgyzstan. It is a right tributary of the river Naryn. The 75 km long On-Archa drains a basin area of 1570 km^{2}, and has annual average flow rate - 9.92 m^{3}/s. In its upper reaches it is known as Soltonsary and Köktorpok. The Soltonsary originates in the Karazhorğo and Kapkatash ranges, while the Köktorpok rises from glaciers on the northern slopes of the Nura Range. The river is used for irrigation. The villages of Onarcha and Ming-Bulak are located along its banks. Artifacts from the Stone Age have been found in the river valley.

== Hydrology ==
The On-Archa River has a mixed flow regime dominated by groundwater and cryospheric sources. Its runoff is formed primarily by springs (46.2%), followed by glacier meltwater (27.4%) and snowmelt (24%). Rainfall plays a minor role in the overall water balance.

The river’s mean annual discharge is 9.92 m^{3}/s (350 cu ft/s). Peak flow occurs during the summer melt season in June and July, while the lowest discharge is observed in winter, mainly from December to February. Seasonal flooding typically begins in April as snowmelt intensifies, and water levels gradually decline from September onward.

Glaciation remains an important component of the basin’s hydrology. Glaciers within the On-Archa catchment cover a total area of approximately 10.6 km^{2} (4.1 sq mi), contributing to sustained summer flows and regulating interannual runoff variability.
