= Kara-Suu, Toguz-Toro =

Kara-Suu Кара-Суу
- Location within Kyrgyzstan
- Coordinates: 41°25′46″N 74°01′13″E
- Country: Kyrgyzstan
- Region: Jalal-Abad Region
- District: Toguz-Toro District
- Elevation: 1,307 m (4,288 ft)

Population (2021)
  - Total: 517
- Time zone: UTC+6

Kara-Suu (Kyrgyz: Кара-Суу) is a village in Jalal-Abad Region of Kyrgyzstan. It is part of the Kargalyk rural community of the Toguz-Toro District. Its population was 2,148 in 2021.
