= Dödömöl =

Dödömöl Дөдөмөл
- Location within Kyrgyzstan
- Coordinates: 41°27′52″N 74°20′24″E
- Country: Kyrgyzstan
- Region: Jalal-Abad Region
- District: Toguz-Toro District
- Elevation: 2,080 m (6,820 ft)

Population (2021)
  - Total: 1,139
- Time zone: UTC+6

Dödömöl (Kyrgyz: Дөдөмөл) is a village in Jalal-Abad Region of Kyrgyzstan. It is part of the Toguz-Toro District. Its population was 1139 in 2021.
