= Papan Reservoir =

Dam in Osh Province, Kyrgyzstan

Papan Reservoir Dam
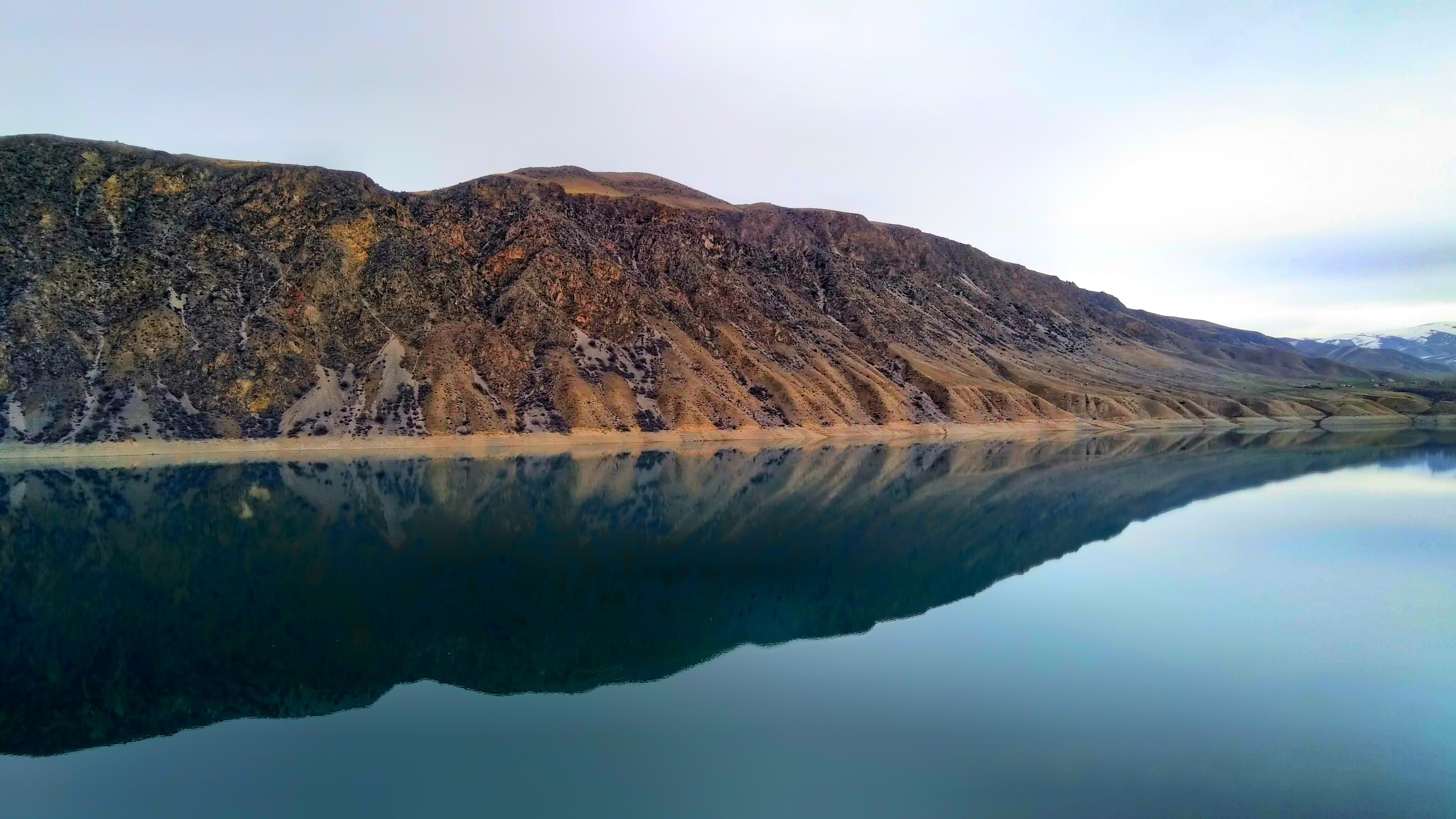

- Location within Kyrgyzstan
- Official name: Папан суу сактагычы (Kyrgyz); Папан водохранилище (Russian)
- Location: Kara-Suu District, Osh Region, Kyrgyz Republic
- Coordinates: 40°22′00″N 72°54′45″E
- Opening date: 1985

Dam and spillways
- Type of dam: Earth
- Impounds: Ak Buura River
- Height: 100 m (330 ft)
- Length: 93 m (305 ft)

Reservoir
- Creates: Papan reservoir Папан суу сактагычы
- Total capacity: 260,000,000 m^{3} (9.2×10^{9} cu ft) maximum 240,000,000 m^{3} (8.5×10^{9} cu ft) nominal
- Surface area: 2.67 km^{2} (1.03 sq mi)
- Maximum water depth: 87 m (285 ft)

Papan Reservoir (Kyrgyz: Папан суу сактагычы, Russian: Папан водохранилище), is a reservoir on the Ak Buura River in Kara-Suu District, Osh Region, southwestern Kyrgyzstan. The reservoir has a maximum total storage capacity of approximately 260 million cubic metres and a surface area of about 2.67 km². The reservoir is primarily used for irrigation and regulation of the Ak Buura River, and to also supply water to the city of Osh. Water released from the reservoir supports agricultural areas within the Ak Buura Valley as well as the Ferghana Valley further downstream in Uzbekistan.

== History ==
Construction of the Papan Reservoir began in 1979 during the Soviet period, and the reservoir and its accompanying dam was completed in 1985. The original dam was constructed with alluvial sands, gravels, and a grouted core designed to withstand earthquakes, as southern Kyrgyzstan sits in an active seismic zone.

Following the collapse of the Soviet Union, the reservoir's aging infrastructure faced operational strain. In 1993, high pressure water flow severely damaged the steel lining of the 500 m outlet tunnel just downstream of the dam control gates. Major structural repairs was subsequently undertaken to restore its operational stability, and was reportedly completed without draining the reservoir.

Since the 2020s, amid efforts by Kyrgyzstan to increase domestic energy production, attention has turned to the hydroelectric potential of the reservoir. The original dam was constructed primarily for irrigation and to supply water, and was hence not equipped with hydroelectric generating units. In October 2024, construction began to build a new hydroelectric power station at the dam. The development is being undertaken as a joint venture between JSC Chakan HPP and the Kyrgyz-Chinese Joint Hydropower Construction Company, at an estimated cost of US$ 27 million. The Papan Hydroelectric Power Plant is expected to be equipped with three individual turbine, each with a nominal output of around 10 MW, giving the station a total nominal capacity of 30 MW. Completion is scheduled in late 2027.
