= Tash-Kömür =

Tash-Kömür Таш-Көмүр
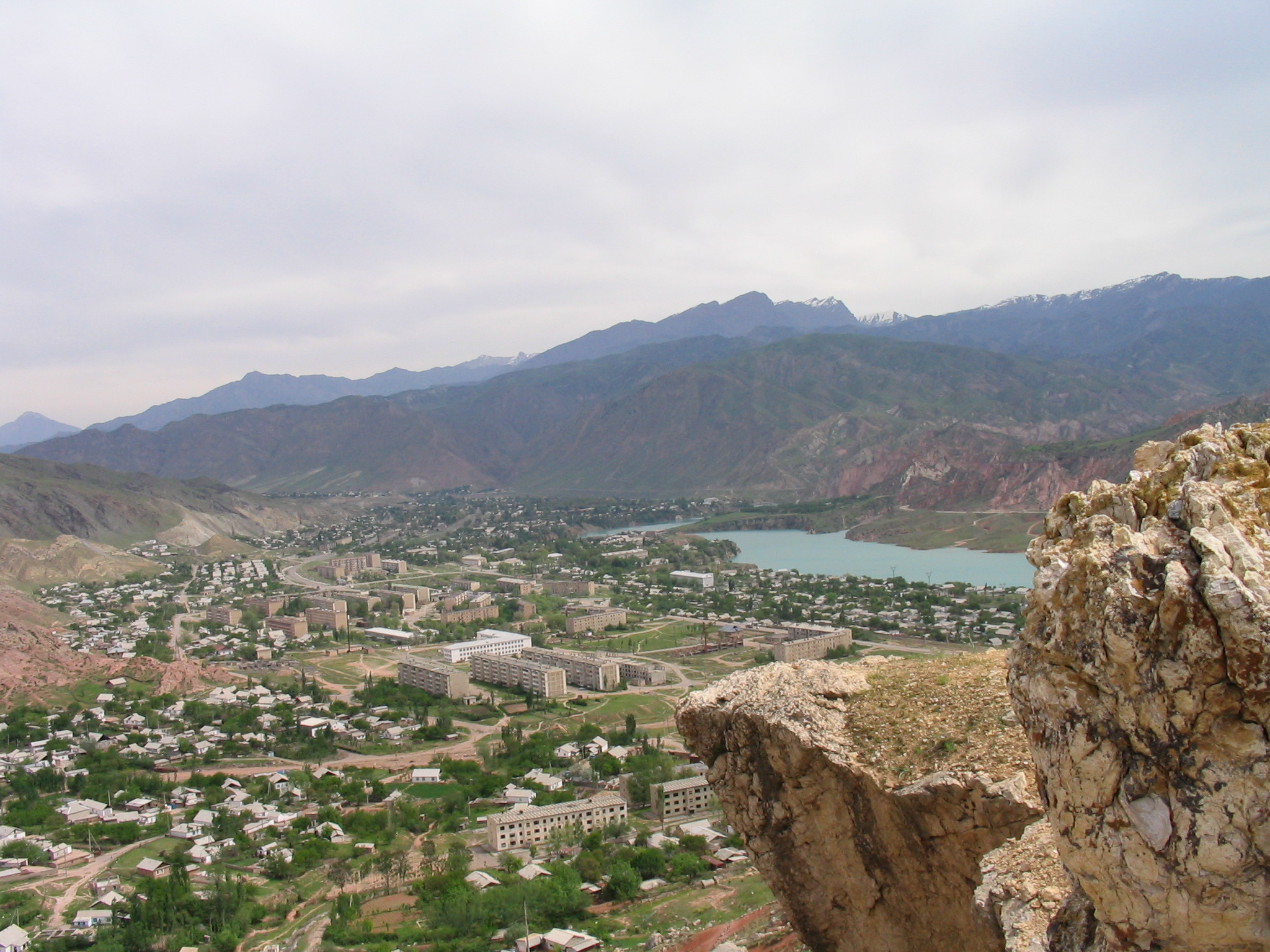
- Tash-Kömür from Crocodile Mountain

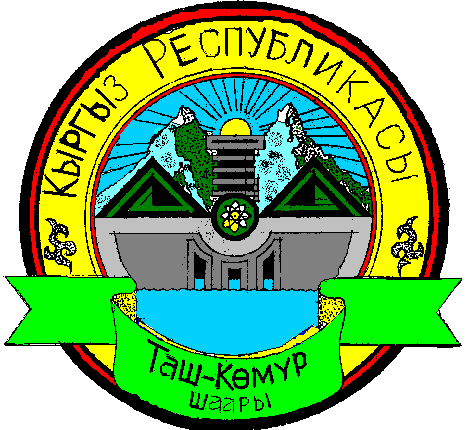
- Seal

- Location in Kyrgyzstan
- Coordinates: 41°21′N 72°13′E
- Country: Kyrgyzstan
- Region: Jalal-Abad Region

Area
  - Total: 47 km^{2} (18 sq mi)
- Elevation: 585 m (1,919 ft)

Population (2021)
  - Total: 44,065
  - Density: 940/km^{2} (2,400/sq mi)
- Time zone: UTC+6

Tash-Kömür (Kyrgyz: Таш-Көмүр, Russian: Таш-Кумыр Tash-Kumyr) is one of the five largest towns of Jalal-Abad Region in Southern Kyrgyzstan. It is a city of regional significance, not part of a district. Its area is 47 square kilometres (18 sq mi), and its resident population was 44,065 in 2021. It is located along the West bank of the river Naryn, opposite the main Osh - Bishkek road. Located at the edge of the Tien Shan Mountains, when heading South from Bishkek, Tash-Kömür is the gateway to the Fergana valley.

== History ==
Officially founded on December 17, 1943, Tash-Kömür, meaning stone-coal, grew into one of the largest industrial centers of the Central Asian region of the Soviet Union. It was primarily a mining town, but had a cigarette factory and other industries as well, which complemented the output of the coal mines. A railroad was constructed, and trains transported the coal out of Tash-Kömür to all corners of the Soviet Union. At its peak, Tash-Kömür had a population of around 35,000.

Dams constructed along the Naryn river transformed what used to be a stream into a sizable river. Residents will also attest to a change in climate, which they attribute to the dams. Furthermore, the Tash-Kömür dam and the Shamaldysay dam raised the water level considerably, causing certain settlements to be submerged by the water. Despite the presence of the dams and hydroelectric plants, Tash-Kömür still does not have 100% reliable electricity.

== Population ==
Historical population
Year	Pop.	±% p.a.
1970	24,126	—
1979	26,494	+1.05%
1989	38,274	+3.75%
1999	39,907	+0.42%
2009	34,756	−1.37%
2021	44,065	+2.00%
Note: resident population; Sources:

== Land and people ==
Tash-Kömür is located in what could be described as a canyon, which the Naryn river runs through.

Fossils of dinosaurs and dinosaur eggs have been discovered in the area, and paleontologists have speculated that once the area was used by dinosaurs to lay their eggs. The mountains surrounding the town are rich in minerals, not only in coal, which gave Tash-Kömür its fame.

The town spans about 5 kilometers (3.1 mi) north to south, but is less than a kilometer (0.6 miles) across. There is no arable land in Tash-Kömür, although just a few kilometers south the Fergana Valley begins, and the cotton plantations are ubiquitous, alongside the melons and other crops.

Tash-Kömür is divided into five neighborhoods: Severniy (the North), Bayetova, the Center, Dostuk, and the Mikrorayon. Each neighborhood has its own school, except for the center, where there are 3 schools.

The town of Tash-Kömür also oversees two towns (Kyzyl-Jar and Shamaldy-Say) and five villages: Kyzyl-Alma, Tengdik, Chüyüt-Say, Kuduk-Say and Kashkulak-Say. Shamaldy-Say, the largest of these places, has three schools (#2, #8, and #10) while the other three villages have only one school each (#11, #6, and #9 respectively).

At the time of its foundation, the population of Tash-Kömür was mostly Russian and ethnically non-Kyrgyz. There was no grazable land, so the Kyrgyz had never settled there. After coal was discovered, Kyrgyz families began to move into town. Until Kyrgyzstan's independence in 1991 the Kyrgyz were not the overwhelming majority. However, after the breakup of the Soviet Union, many Russians and residents of other nationalities began to leave. This was particularly the case until 1995, when the biggest economic problems affected the town, which continue to this day (2006). Now the Kyrgyz population makes up over 90% of the population. Although only about 20 kilometers (12 mi) from the Uzbek border, Tash-Kömür does not have a large Uzbek population (less than 50 families). The total population of Tash-Kömür is estimated to be between 20–25,000, however the continuous emigration of its residents makes it hard to know exactly.

== Economy ==
Ever since the mine was shut down and the factories closed, the town has been struggling to survive. The answer, for many, has been to emigrate to Russia, Kazakhstan, or simply to the capital, Bishkek. Most families claim at least one member working abroad to make ends meet. The men usually work construction jobs, while the women find jobs as saleswomen at the bazaars or stores. These migrant workers are usually seasonal: they leave in the early spring and return in the fall, since the cold in the North makes for hard working conditions. The remittances have allowed Tash-Kömür residents to retain a decent standard of living. In recent years, many have used the money to renovate their homes, to buy DVD players and satellite dishes, or to open stores, and try to start a business.

As Uzbekistan has made it more difficult and expensive for goods to be exported south into, and through Uzbekistan, Tash-Kömür's major opening to the outside world has been severed and in turn, its ability to export any goods it might manufacture has dropped.

While during the Soviet era all apartment buildings had gas and working plumbing, this is no longer the case. Water delivery, especially to the homes on the edge of town, is not reliable. There is no hot water. In 2006 cell phones finally reached Tash-Kömür, which had been one of the last towns in the country left without them.
