= Kosh-Bulak, Jalal-Abad =

Kosh-Bulak
- Location within Kyrgyzstan
- Coordinates: 41°28′0″N 74°23′50″E
- Country: Kyrgyzstan
- Region: Jalal-Abad Region
- District: Toguz-Toro District

Population (2021)
  - Total: 517
- Time zone: UTC+6

Kosh-Bulak is a village in Jalal-Abad Region of Kyrgyzstan. It is part of the Toguz-Toro District. Its population was 517 in 2021.
