= Kambar-Ata-2 Hydroelectric Power Station =

Hydroelectric power station in Kyrgyzstan

Kambar-Ata-2 Hydro Power Plant
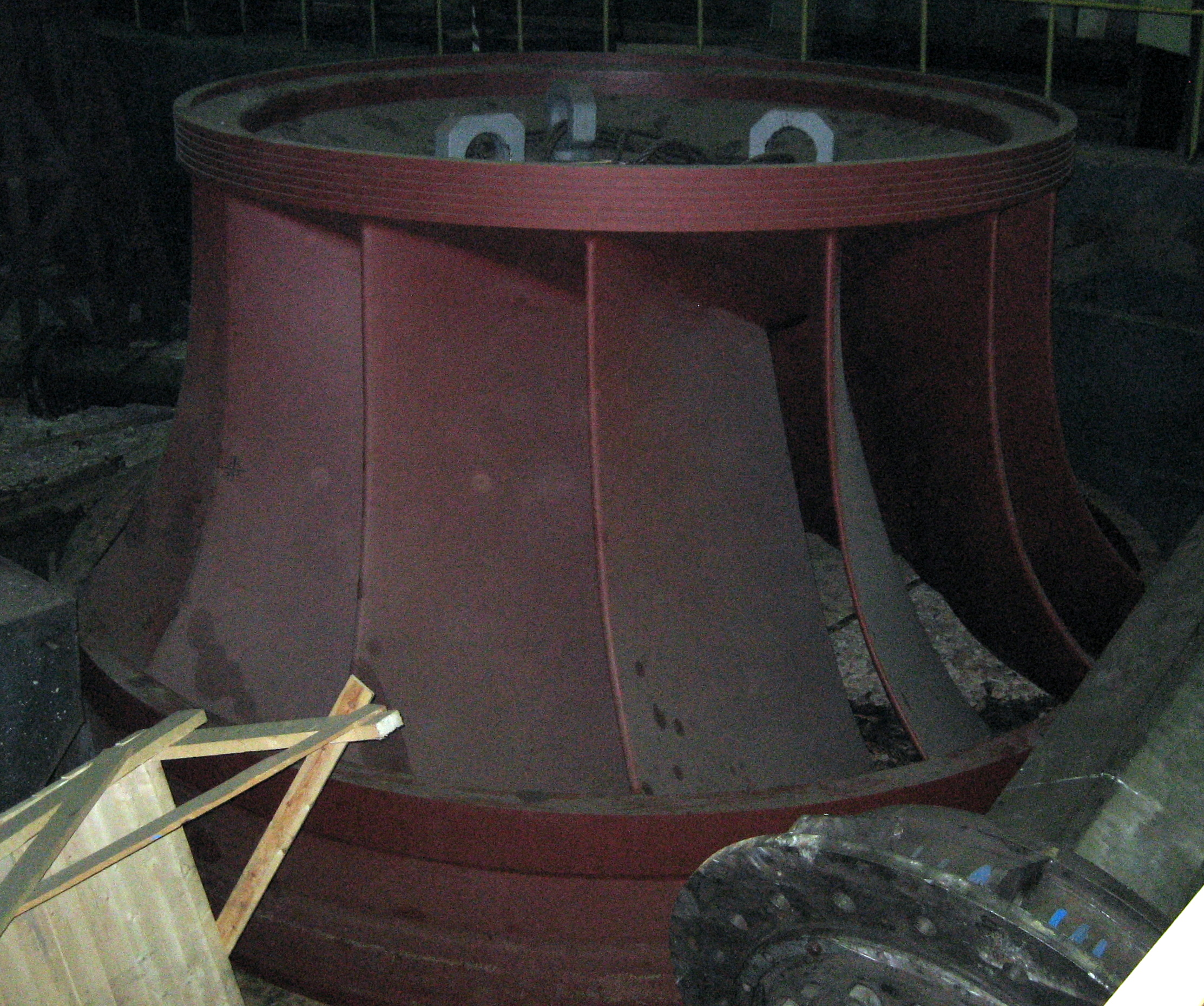
- One of the power plant's Francis turbines
- Official name: Камбар-Ата-2 ГЭСи (Kyrgyz); Камбаратинская ГЭС-2 (Russian)
- Country: Kyrgyzstan
- Location: Kara-Jygach
- Coordinates: 41°46′26″N 73°19′52″E
- Status: Operational
- Construction began: 1986–1991, 2008–presently
- Commission date: 27 November 2010; 15 years ago
- Operator: OJSC Electric Stations

Thermal power station
- Primary fuel: Hydropower

Power generation
- Units operational: 1 x 120 MW Francis-type
- Nameplate capacity: 120 MW

The Kambar-Ata-2 Hydro Power Plant (Kyrgyz: Камбар-Ата-2 ГЭСи, Russian: Камбаратинская ГЭС-2) is a hydroelectric power station on the Naryn River near Kara-Jygach, Toktogul District, Kyrgyzstan. It is located upstream of the Toktogul Reservoir. The first of the plant's three generator turbine was commissioned on 27 November 2010. The plant is operated by OJSC Electric Stations (Электр станциялар ААК), which employs around 250 staff in the operation of this plant.

== History ==
Construction of the power station began in 1986 during the Soviet period. It was built as the first of two power stations forming the "Cascade of Kambar-Ata" hydroelectric power stations development along the Naryn River, that also included the Kambar-Ata 1 Hydroelectric Power Plant. Construction of the hydroelectric facilities was undertaken by OJSC Narynhydroenergostroy (Нарын гидроэнергия курулуш ААК). Following the independence of Kyrgyzstan, however, construction was suspended for several years. Works only resumed following the adoption of a government resolution on 23 October 2007, with full scale construction restarting again the following year.

The plant's first hydroelectric generating unit was launched on 30 August 2010, and commissioned on 27 November 2010. With only one of its three generating units currently in operation, the plant has an installed capacity of 120 MW.

Construction of the second generator turbine is expected to be completed by 2029 at an estimated cost of approximately US$138 million. Of this amount, US$100 million is being financed by the Eurasian Development Bank, with the remainder funded by the Kyrgyz government. Despite the first unit having an installed capacity of 120 MW, limitations in the existing transmission infrastructure restrict the amount of electricity that can be transmitted to 90 MW. Upgrading the transmission line was estimated to cost KGS 1.5 billion. In the interim, the Kyrgyz government has also approved the construction of a cryptocurrency mining facility intended to utilise electricity that cannot be transmitted to the grid. An estimated US$20 million is expected to be invested in the facility.

== Design ==
When the Kambar-Ata-2 Hydroelectric Power Station is fully completed, it will be equipped with three individual Francis turbine-generators each with a nominal output of around 120 MW, giving the station a total nominal capacity of 360 MW. The power plant's dam is 60 m (197 ft) high, and forms a reservoir with a total storage capacity of 70 million m^{3}, of which 7.5 million m^{3} is usable for power generation.
