= Shamaldy-Say Hydroelectric Power Station =

Kyrgyzstani hydroelectric power plant

Shamaldy-Say Hydro Power Plant
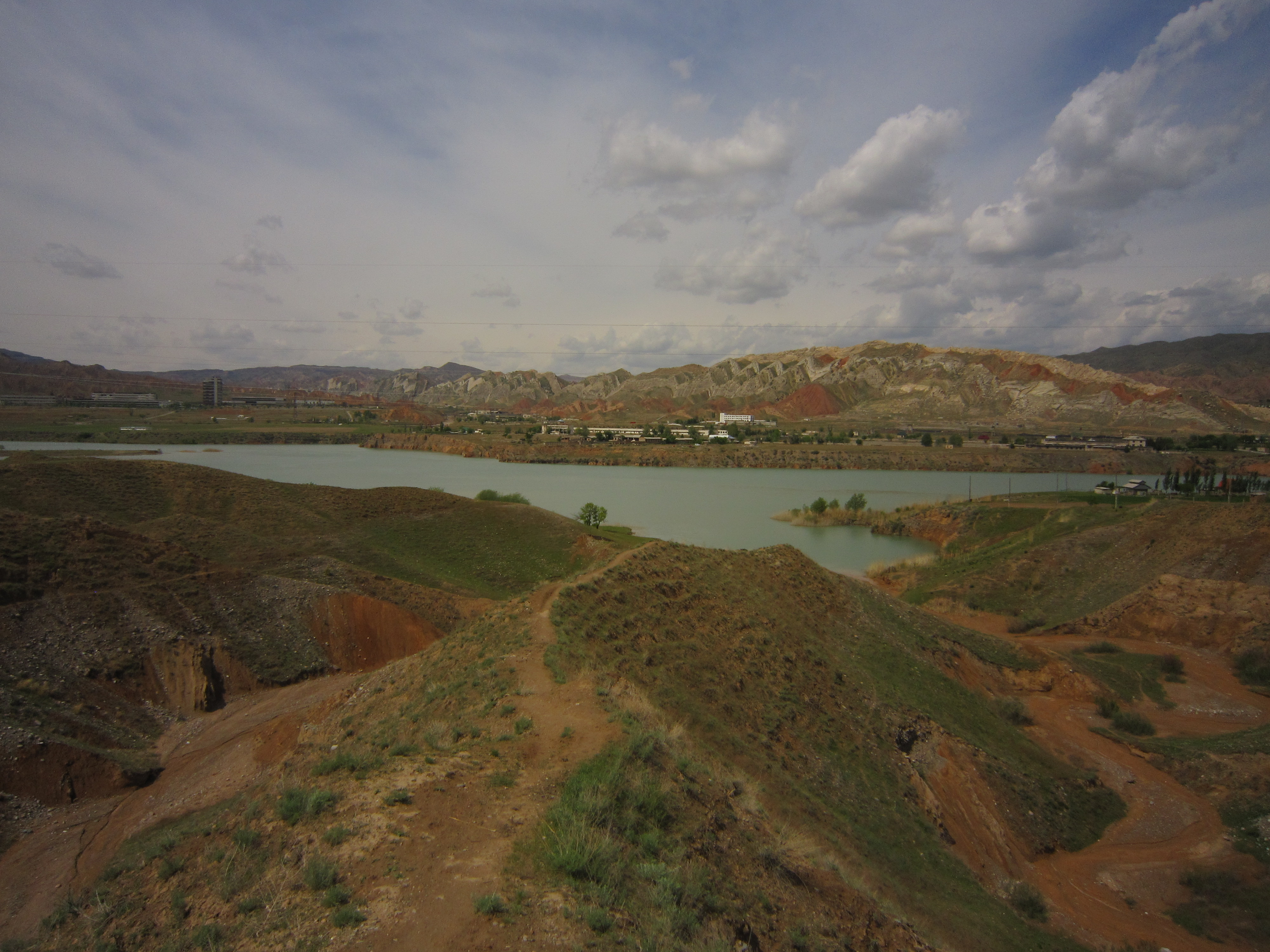
- Shamaldy-Say Reservoir near Tash-Kömür
- Official name: Шамалды-Сай ГЭСи (Kyrgyz); Шамалды-Сайская ГЭС (Russian)
- Country: Kyrgyzstan
- Location: Shamaldy-Say
- Coordinates: 41°18′42″N 72°11′28″E
- Status: Operational
- Commission date: 1992–1995
- Operator: OJSC Electric Stations

Thermal power station
- Primary fuel: Hydropower

Power generation
- Units operational: 3
- Nameplate capacity: 240 MW

The Shamaldy-Say Hydro Power Plant (Kyrgyz: Шамалды-Сай ГЭСи, Russian: Шамалды-Сайская ГЭС) is a hydroelectric power station on the Naryn River between Tash-Kömür and Shamaldy-Say, in Kyrgyzstan. Launched in three phases between 1992 and 1995, it is located 14 km downstream from the Tash-Kömür Hydroelectric Power Station. The plant is operated by OJSC Electric Stations (Электр станциялар ААК), which employees around 700 staff in the operation of the plant and two other hydroelectric power stations that together form the "Cascade of Tash-Kömür" hydroelectric power stations development.

== History ==
Construction of the power station began in February 1986, during the Soviet period, as the Tash-Kömür Hydroelectric Power Station was nearing completion. It was built as the third of three power stations in the "Cascade of Tash-Kömür" along the Naryn River, that also included the Üch-Korgon and Tash-Kömür hydroelectric power stations. Construction of the hydroelectric facilities along the river was undertaken by OJSC Narynhydroenergostroy (Нарын гидроэнергия курулуш ААК). The plant's first hydroelectric generating unit was launched on 1 July 1992, followed by the second on 12 February 1994, and the third on 30 December 1995. The plant reached its design capacity in 2002.

As the plant was only operational after the independence of Kyrgyzstan, management began under state owned JSC Kyrgyzenergo. After Kyrgyzenergo was reorganised in 2001, operation of the plant was transferred to OJSC Electric Stations.

In 2018, as part of the commissioning of the power station, a 560 ton gantry crane was installed to replace the existing stationary lifting equipment. Generators, transformers, and communications equipment in the plant have also undergone replacement or modernisation over the years, as at many other hydroelectric power stations along the Naryn River, partly to address deficiencies in the original equipment and to also accommodate increased demand on the electricity grid during the winter months.

== Design ==
The Shamaldy Say Hydro Power Plant is equipped with three individual turbine each with a nominal output of around 80 MW, giving the station a total nominal capacity of 240 MW. The power plant's dam is 37 m (121 ft) high, and forms a reservoir with a total storage capacity of about 41 million m^{3}, of which approximately 5.5 million m^{3} is usable for power generation.
