= Kara-Jygach, Toktogul =

Kara-Jygach
- Location within Kyrgyzstan
- Coordinates: 41°46′48″N 73°16′48″E
- Country: Kyrgyzstan
- Region: Jalal-Abad Region
- District: Toktogul District
- Elevation: 920 m (3,020 ft)

Population (2021)
  - Total: 3,263
- Time zone: UTC+6

Kara-Jygach is a village in Jalal-Abad Region of Kyrgyzstan. It is part of the Toktogul District. Its population was 3,263 in 2021.
