= Ala-Buga =

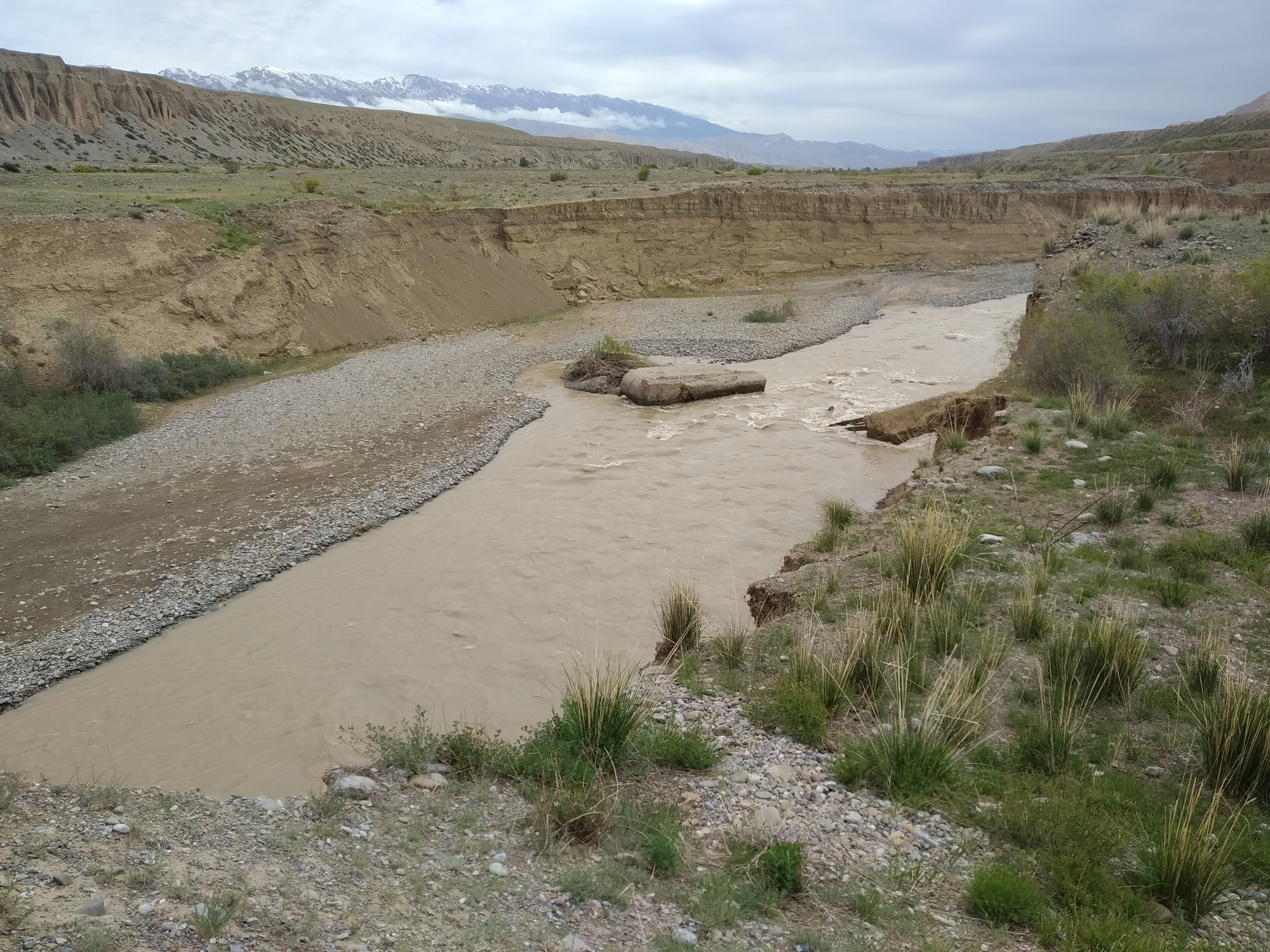

Location
- Country: Kyrgyzstan
- Location: Ak-Talaa District

Physical characteristics
- Source
  - location: Fergana Range, Torugart Too
- Mouth
  - location: Naryn
  - coordinates: 41.4306°N 74.6895°E
- Length: 180 km (110 mi)
- Basin size: 5,820 km^{2} (2,250 sq mi)
- Discharge
  - average: Annual average::31 m^{3}/s (1,100 cu ft/s)

Basin features
- Progression: Naryn→ Syr Darya→ North Aral Sea
- Tributaries
  - left: Bychan, Söök, Karasuu, Mingzhylky, Mynakeldi, Kyrchynbulak.
  - right: Kumaryk, Jamandavan, Kongorchok, Kashkasuu, Makmal.

The Ala-Buga (Kyrgyz: Ала-Буга, also Алабуга) is a left tributary of the Naryn in Naryn Region of Kyrgyzstan. The river is known as Arpa in its upper reaches; the rivers Arpa and Bychan merge to form the Ala-Buga. The Ala-Buga is formed on the north slopes of the Torugart Range and the south slopes of the Jaman-Too mountains. Flowing eastward through the Arpa Valley, it widens and becomes shallower as it enters the Middle Naryn Valley.

== Hydrology ==
It is 180 kilometres (110 mi) long, and has a drainage basin of 5,820 square kilometres (2,250 sq mi). It has an average elevation of 3,290 metres (10,790 ft), an annual average flow rate of 31 cubic metres per second (1,100 cu ft/s), and an average specific discharge of 8.35 L/s•km^{2}.

== Tributaries ==
Major tributaries include:

- Right-bank tributaries: Kumaryk (23 km (14 mi)), Jamandavan(64 km (40 mi)), Kongorchok (39 km (24 mi)), Kashkasuu (33 km (21 mi)), Makmal (41 km (25 mi)).
- Left-bank tributaries: Bychan (40 km (25 mi)), Söök (45 km (28 mi)), Karasuu, Mingzhylky, Mynakeldi, Kyrchynbulak.

== Settlements ==
Settlements located along the banks of Ala-Buga include Kosh-Döbö, Jerge-Tal and Kongorchok.
