= Atay, Toguz-Toro =

Atay Атай
- Location within Kyrgyzstan
- Coordinates: 41°20′36″N 73°51′14″E
- Country: Kyrgyzstan
- Region: Jalal-Abad Region
- District: Toguz-Toro District
- Elevation: 1,358 m (4,455 ft)

Population (2021)
  - Total: 1,672
- Time zone: UTC+6

Atay (Kyrgyz: Атай) is a village in Jalal-Abad Region of Kyrgyzstan. It is part of the Toguz-Toro District. Its population was 1672 in 2021.
