= Kambarata-1 Dam =

Proposed dam in central Kyrgyzstan

Kambar-Ata Dam
- Location within Kyrgyzstan
- Official name: Камбар-Ата 1 ГЭСи
- Country: Kyrgyzstan
- Coordinates: 41°46′17″N 73°26′10″E
- Status: Under construction
- Construction began: 8 June 2022
- Opening date: First unit planned 2028

Dam and spillways
- Impounds: Naryn River
- Height: 256 m (840 ft)

Reservoir
- Total capacity: 4,560,000 dam^{3} (3,696,852 acre⋅ft)

Power Station
- Operator: Electric Stations Open Joint Stock Company
- Turbines: 4
- Installed capacity: 1,860 MW
- Annual generation: 5640 GWh

The Kambar-Ata Hydroelectric Power Plant (also known as Kambar-Ata 1 HPP) is a major hydroelectric dam under construction on the Naryn River in central Kyrgyzstan. When completed, it will be the largest facility in the Kambar-Ata cascade and one of the largest hydroelectric projects in Central Asia.

== Construction and financing ==
Preparatory works — including tunnel completion, road and bridge construction, build‑out of 110 kV and 110/6 kV substations, and a workers’ camp — progressed through late 2024 and into 2025, with technical and environmental studies underway. The dam’s technical-economic feasibility study recommends roller‑compacted concrete construction.

Total project cost is estimated at $3.5–6 billion. Kyrgyzstan has allocated over $46 million for preparatory works; additional funding includes a $18.6 million World Bank grant and $13.6 million in IDA financing. A trilateral joint venture between Kyrgyzstan, Kazakhstan, and Uzbekistan has been signed, with a Coordination Donor Committee including the World Bank, ADB, EBRD, IDA, OPEC Fund, AIIB, and others. An intergovernmental roadmap was agreed in January 2025.

== Reception and outlook ==
The first attempt to build a dam at this site was in 1986, but construction stopped due to the collapse of the Soviet Union in 1991.

On January 6, 2023, the energy ministers of Kyrgyzstan, Kazakhstan and Uzbekistan signed a roadmap for the project.

== See also ==
- Kambar-Ata-2 Hydroelectric Power Station – built downstream
