= Torugart Range =

Mountain range in the Tien Shan, Kyrgyzstan and China

- Torugart Too
- Location within Kyrgyzstan

Highest point
- Elevation: 5,108 m (16,759 ft)
- Coordinates: 40°26′59″N 75°05′16″E

Dimensions
- Length: 64 km (40 mi) E–W
- Width: 20 km (12 mi) N–S

Naming
- Native name: Торугарт кырка тоосу (Kyrgyz)

Geography
- Countries: Kyrgyzstan and China

Geology
- Rock type(s): composed of Silurian-aged sandstones, clayey limestones, shales, and Carboniferous conglomerates, sandstones, shales, and clays

The Torugart Range (Kyrgyz: Торугарт кырка тоосу) is a mountain range in the Inner Tien Shan, located along the border between Kyrgyzstan and China. It extends for approximately 64 kilometres (40 mi) in length and has a maximum width of about 20 kilometres (12 mi). The highest peak reaches an elevation of 5,108 metres (16,759 ft) (at the headwaters of the Muztör River). The average elevation is 4,500 metres (14,800 ft). The northern slope is dissected by ancient glacier-formed trough-shaped valleys, and morainic deposits are found at the foothills. Most of the glaciers are located within the Muztör basin. Above 3,600 metres (11,800 ft) on the northern slope grow low subalpine and alpine vegetation. The southern slope is dry. The range is composed of Silurian-aged sandstones, clayey limestones, shales, and Carboniferous conglomerates, sandstones, shales, and clays. The range of the mountain curves slightly southward in an arc-like shape.
