= Shamaldy-Say =

Shamaldy-Say Шамалды-Сай
- Urban-type settlement
- Location in Kyrgyzstan
- Coordinates: 41°11′50″N 72°10′49″E
- Country: Kyrgyzstan
- Region: Jalal-Abad Region
- Town: Tash-Kömür
- Urban-type settlement status: 1957

Population (2021)
  - Total: 12,308
- Time zone: UTC+6 (KGT)

Shamaldy-Say (Kyrgyz: Шамалды-Сай) is an urban-type settlement in Jalal-Abad Region, Kyrgyzstan. The town is administratively subordinated to town Tash-Kömür. Its population was 12,308 in 2021. Adjacent to the urban-type settlement Shamaldy-Say is the village Shamaldy-Say, population 6,526 (2021), which is part of Nooken District.

== Population ==
Historical population
Year	Pop.	±% p.a.
1970	5,764	—
1979	6,045	+0.53%
1989	8,894	+3.94%
1999	9,336	+0.49%
2009	9,550	+0.23%
2021	12,308	+2.14%
Note: resident population; Sources:
