= Kürpsay Hydroelectric Power Station =

Hydroelectric power station in Kyrgyzstan

Kürpsay Hydro Power Plant
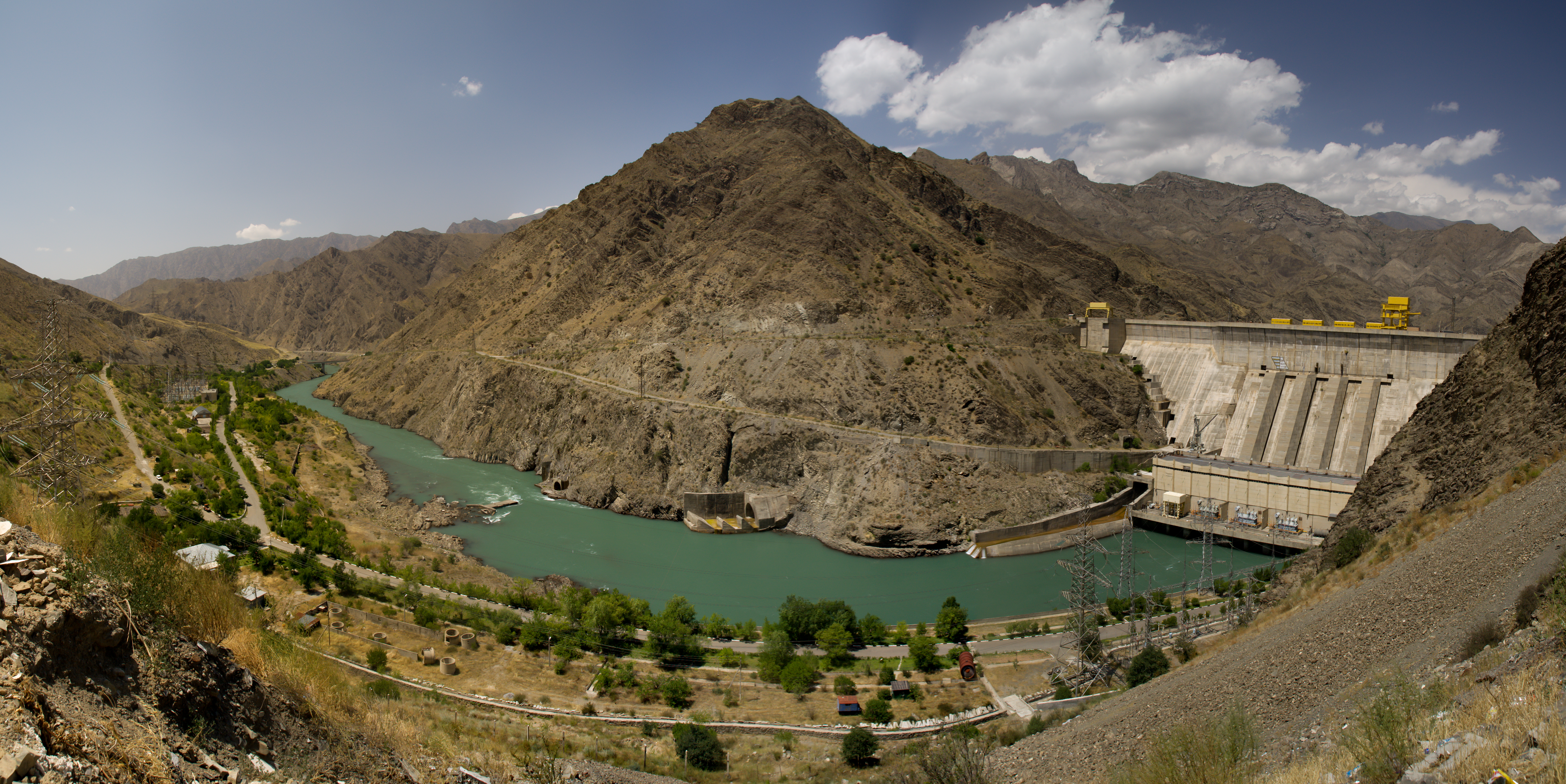
- Kürpsay hydro power plant and dam, July 2012
- Official name: Күрпсай ГЭСи (Kyrgyz); Курпсайская ГЭС (Russian)
- Country: Kyrgyzstan
- Location: Jalal-Abad Region
- Coordinates: 41°29′56″N 72°21′51″E
- Status: Operational
- Commission date: 1981–1982
- Operator: OJSC Electric Stations

Thermal power station
- Primary fuel: Hydropower

Power generation
- Units operational: 4
- Nameplate capacity: 800 MW

External links
- Commons: Related media on Commons

The Kürpsay Hydro Power Plant (Kyrgyz: Күрпсай ГЭСи, Russian: Курпсайская ГЭС) is a hydroelectric power station on the Naryn River in Jalal-Abad Region, Kyrgyzstan. Launched in four phases between 1981 and 1982, it is located downstream from the Toktogul Dam. The plant is operated by OJSC Electric Stations (Электр станциялар ААК), which employs approximately 1,100 staff in the operation of the plant and another hydroelectric power station, together forming the "Cascade of Toktogul" hydroelectric power stations development.

== History ==
Construction of the power station began in 1976 during the Soviet period. It was built as the second of two power stations in the "Cascade of Toktogul" along the Naryn River, that also included the Toktogul hydroelectric power station. Construction of the hydroelectric facilities along the river was undertaken by OJSC Narynhydroenergostroy (Нарын гидроэнергия курулуш ААК). The plant's first hydroelectric generating unit was launched on 21 February 1981, followed by the second on 19 December 1981, the third on 15 April 1982, and the last on 4 November 1982.

During the Soviet period, the plant was managed by Kirgizglavenergo under the centralised supervision of the Ministry of Energy and Electrification of the Soviet Union. Following the independence of Kyrgyzstan, management was transferred to state owned JSC Kyrgyzenergo. After Kyrgyzenergo was reorganised in 2001, operation of the plant was transferred to OJSC Electric Stations.

Despite its age and deteriorating condition, the plant experienced delays in receiving major overhauls. In 2012, one of its generating units reportedly caught fire, reducing the hydropower station's maximum operating capacity to approximately three-quarters of its installed capacity. In subsequent years, hydraulic and electrical equipment at the plant underwent replacement and modernisation to address deficiencies in the original equipment and to also accommodate increased electricity demand during the winter months.

== Design ==
The Kürpsay Hydro Power Plant is equipped with four individual turbine each with a nominal output of around 200 MW, giving the station a total nominal capacity of 800 MW. The power plant's dam is 113 m (371 ft) high, and forms a reservoir with a total storage capacity of 370 million m^{3}, of which 35 million m^{3} is usable for power generation.
