= Jaman-Too =

- Location within Kyrgyzstan

Highest point
- Elevation: 4,737 m (15,541 ft)
- Coordinates: 40°55′48.47″N 74°52′24.66″E

Dimensions
- Length: 110 km (68 mi) E-W
- Width: 16 km (9.9 mi) N-S

Naming
- Native name: Жаман-Тоо (Kyrgyz); Жамантоо (Kyrgyz); Арпанын Ала-Тоосу (Kyrgyz); Джаман-Тау (Russian)

Geography
- Country: Kyrgyzstan
- Region: Naryn Region
- District: At-Bashy District

The Jaman-Too (Kyrgyz: Жаман-Тоо, Kyrgyz: Жамантоо, or Russian: Джаман-Тау, and also known as Arpanyn Ala-Toosuu) is a range in the south-west of the Internal Tien-Shan. In the east, the range adjoins Fergana Range. It stretches for a length of 110 km (68 mi) with a width of 16 km (9.9 mi). The average elevation is approximately 4,000 m (13,000 ft), and the highest elevation of 4,737 m (15,541 ft). The southern slopes are steep, and northern - gentle. The mountains are composed of limestone, sandstone, and dolomite.
