= Ministry of Energy and Electrification =

Government ministry of the Soviet Union

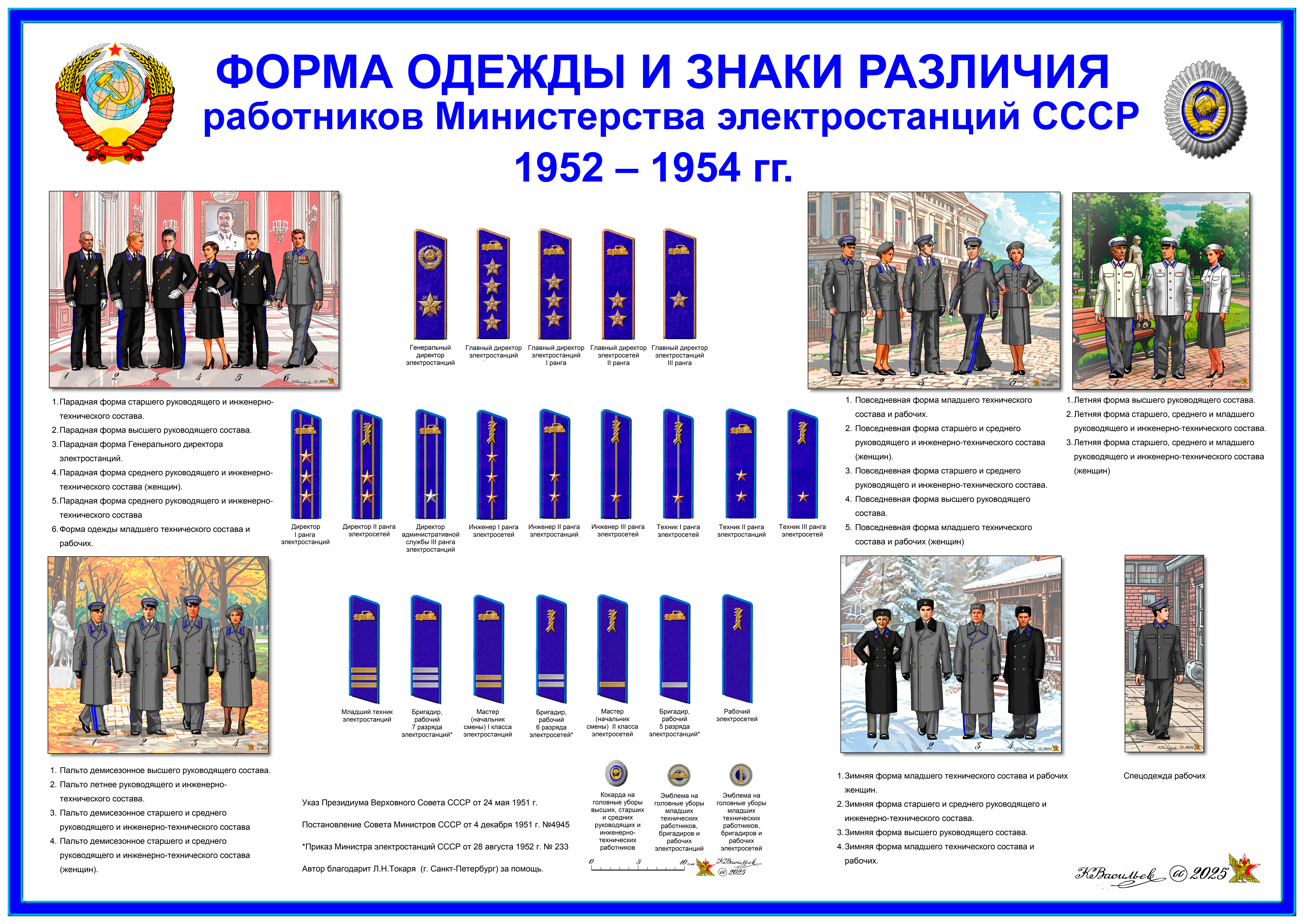
Uniforms and rank insignia of this ministry 1952–1954.

The Ministry of Energy and Electrification (Minenergo; Russian: Министерство энергетики и электрификации СССР) was a government ministry in the Soviet Union. It was the agency responsible for the Soviet Union's electricity policies.

The State Committee for Power and Electrification was upgraded to ministerial status (union-republic) in 1965; changed to all-union on 17 July 1987.

== List of ministers ==
- Ignati Novikov (25.4.1962 - 24.11.1962)
- Pjotr Neporozhny (26.11.1962 - 23.3.1985)
- Anatoli Mayorets (24.3.1985 - 17.7.1989)
- Yuri Semyonov (17.7.1989 - 24.8.1991)
