= Toguz-Toro District =

Coordinates: 41.405°N 74.037°E

Toguz-Toro Тогуз-Торо району
- District
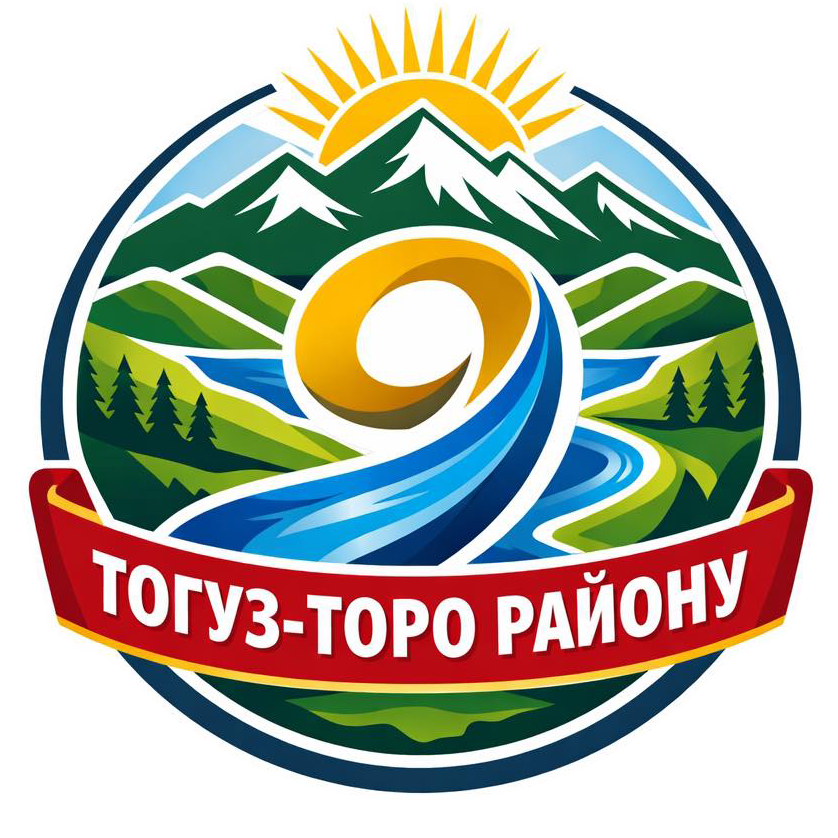
- Coat of arms

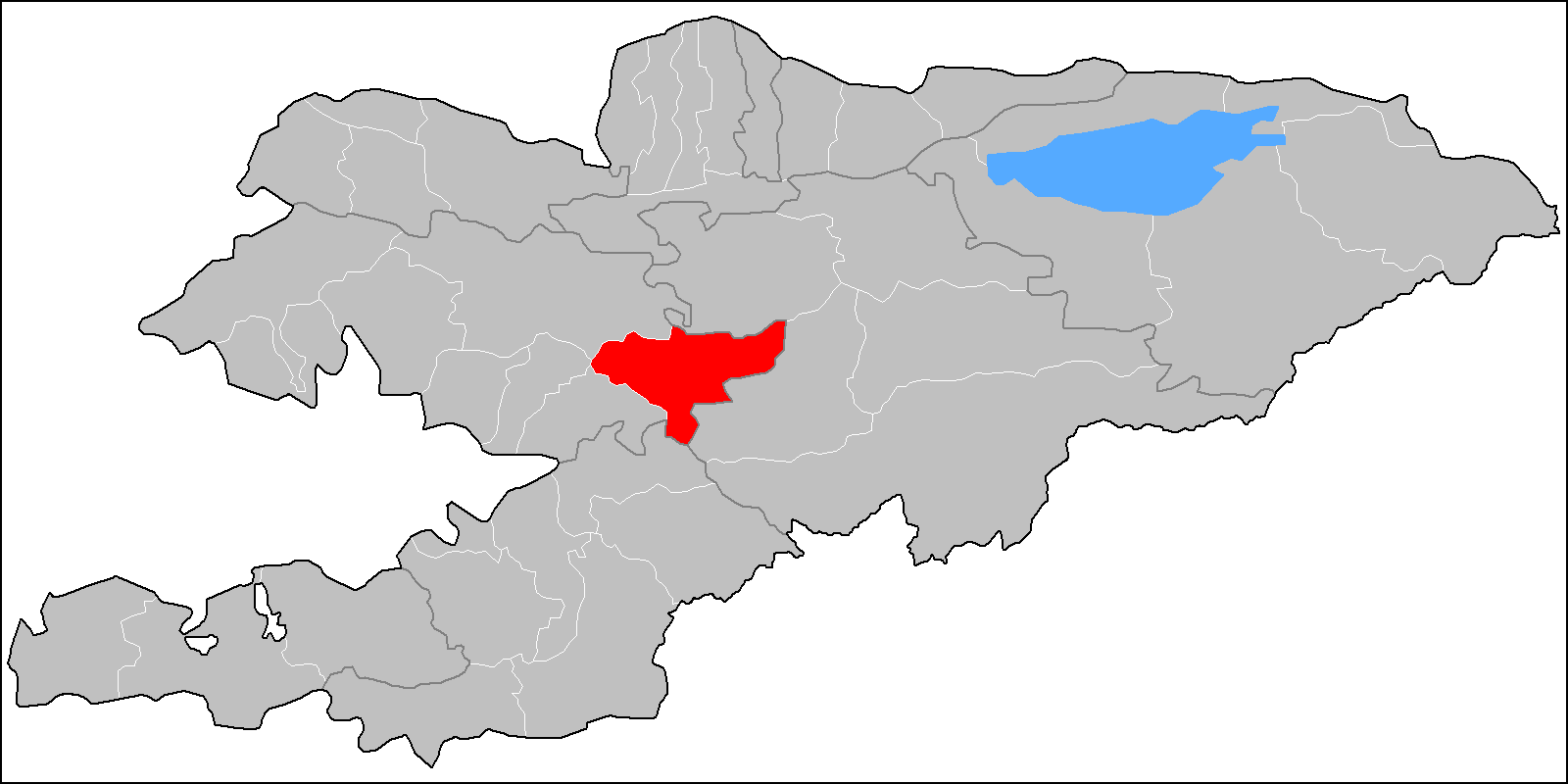
- Country: Kyrgyzstan
- Region: Jalal-Abad Region

Area
  - Total: 3,816 km^{2} (1,473 sq mi)

Population (2021)
  - Total: 25,497
  - Density: 6.682/km^{2} (17.31/sq mi)
- Time zone: UTC+6

Toguz-Toro (Kyrgyz: Тогуз-Торо району) is a district of Jalal-Abad Region in western Kyrgyzstan. The administrative seat lies at Kazarman. Its area is 3,816 square kilometres (1,473 sq mi), and its resident population was 25,497 in 2021.

== Population ==
Historical population
Year	Pop.	±% p.a.
1970	10,060	—
1979	13,641	+3.44%
1989	20,871	+4.34%
1999	21,968	+0.51%
2009	22,136	+0.08%
2021	25,497	+1.18%
Note: resident population; Sources:

== Rural communities and villages ==
In total, Toguz-Toro District includes 14 settlements in 5 rural communities (ayyl aymagy). Each rural community can consist of one or several villages. The rural communities and settlements in the Toguz-Toro District are:

1. Atay (seat: Atay; incl. Karl Marks)
2. Kök-Irim (seat: Aral; incl. Birdik)
3. Kargalyk (seat: Kazarman; incl. Kyzyl-Jyldyz, Makmal and Chet-Bulak)
4. Sary-Bulung (seat: Kara-Suu; incl. Tabylgyty)
5. Toguz-Toro (seat: Dödömöl; incl. Kosh-Bulak, Lenin and Örnök)
Settlements of the Toguz-Toro District
