= Naryn (river) =

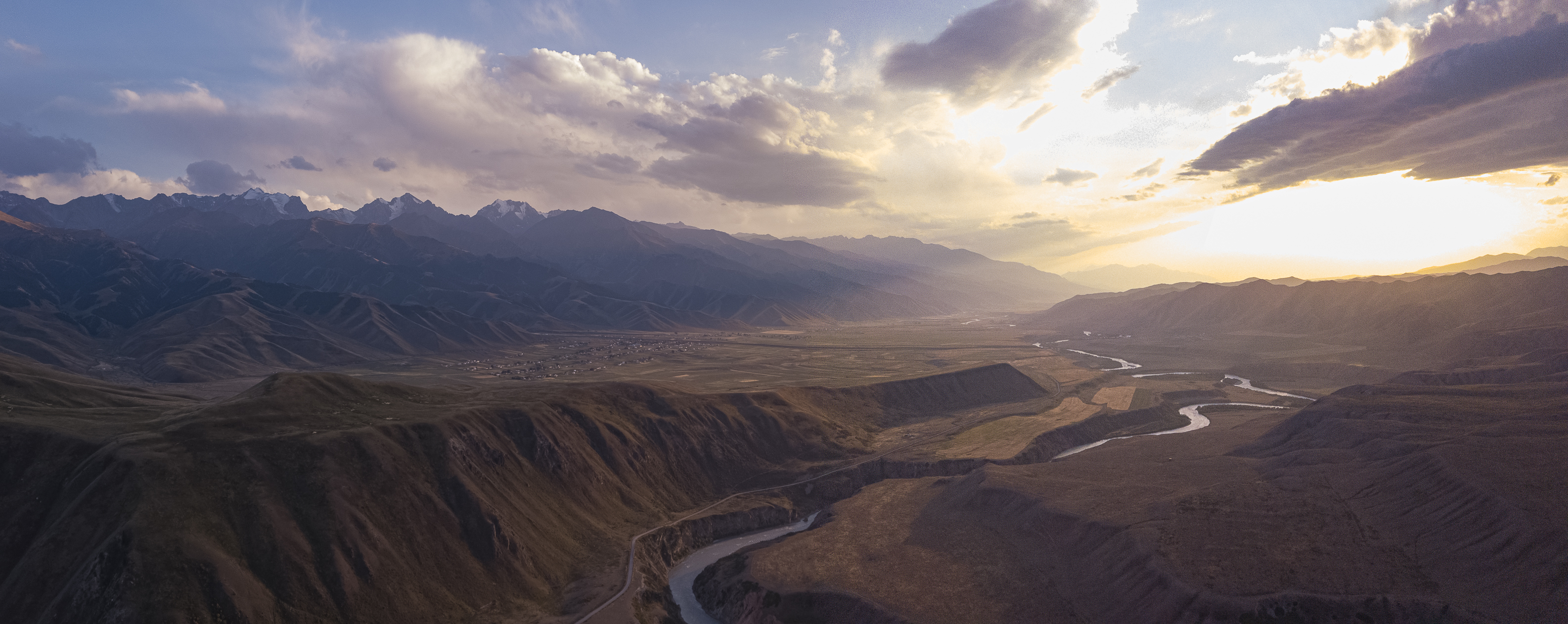
- The river Naryn near Tash-Bashat
- Native name: Нарын (Kyrgyz); Norin (Uzbek)

Location
- Country: Kyrgyzstan, Uzbekistan
- Region: Naryn Region, Jalal-Abad Region
- Cities: Naryn, Kara-Köl, Tash-Kömür, Uchqo'rg'on

Physical characteristics
- Source
  - location: Naryn Region, Kyrgyzstan
- Mouth: Syr Darya
  - location: near Namangan, Uzbekistan
  - coordinates: 40°54′3″N 71°45′27″E
  - elevation: 410 m (1,350 ft)
- Length: 807 km (501 mi)(including Chong Naryn)
- Basin size: 59,100 km^{2} (22,800 sq mi)
- Discharge
  - location: near mouth
  - average: 429 m^{3}/s (15,100 cu ft/s)

Basin features
- Progression: Syr Darya→ North Aral Sea
- Tributaries
  - left: At-Bashy, Ala-Buga
  - right: On-Archa, Kökömeren, Kara-Suu

The Naryn (Kyrgyz: Нарын, Uzbek: Norin) is the largest and most water-abundant river in Kyrgyzstan. It rises in the Tian Shan mountains in Kyrgyzstan, Central Asia, flowing west through the Fergana Valley into Uzbekistan. Here it merges with the Kara Darya (near Namangan) to form the Syr Darya. It is 807 kilometres (501 mi) long (together with its upper course Chong-Naryn) and drains a basin area of 59,100 square kilometres (22,800 sq mi). It has an annual flow of 13.7 cubic kilometres (11,100,000 acre⋅ft).

The basin is bounded by the Terskey Alatoo, Kyrgyz Ala-Too and Talas Ala-Too ranges to the north; by the Kakshaal Too to the south; by the Ak-Shyrak Massif to the east; and by the Fergana Range to the west.

The river contains many reservoirs which are important in the generation of hydroelectricity. The largest of these is the Toktogul Reservoir in Kyrgyzstan containing 19.9 cubic kilometres (16,100,000 acre⋅ft) of water. Dams downstream of the Toktogul in Kyrgyzstan include: Kürpsay, Tash-Kömür, Shamaldy-Say and Üch-Korgon. Upstream of Toktogul in Kyrgyzstan are the Kambar-Ata-2 and At-Bashy Dams while the Kambar-Ata-1 Dam is in planning stages.

== Course ==
The river originates at an elevation of 3,730 m, from a lake at the foot of the Petrov Glacier on the north-western slope of the Ak-Shyrak Massif, where it begins under the name Kumtor. After joining with the Arabelsuu, it forms the Taragay (Jaaktash) River. When the Taragay merges with the Karasay, the river is called Chong Naryn, and it flows westward through a wide, terraced valley.

In the central part of the Upper Naryn Valley, the river branches, its channel widens, and farther west it narrows again. In this section, the Karakol (from the east) and Ulan rivers flow into it. From the confluence of the Ulan River to the junction with the Ayrisuu (a right tributary), the river flows through a very narrow gorge.

In the eastern part of the Naryn Valley, the Chong Naryn and Kichi Naryn merge to form the Naryn River, which initially flows east–west along the left side of a wide, terraced valley. Near the confluence with the Tekesekirik (left tributary), carbonate limestones on the left bank approach red Paleogene–Neogene rocks on the right bank, narrowing the valley. The river then passes the Alamyshyk area through the narrow Ak-Kyya Gorge and turns northwestward.

Farther downstream, the valley widens again, with low banks and a channel width of 80–100 m. Near Kulanak, the river splits into several channels, forming small wooded islands, and receives the At-Bashy and Ala-Buga rivers. From the Alabuga confluence, the Naryn flows westward for about 50 km through a narrow gorge (channel width 40–50 m) between the Moldo Too and Ak-Shyyrak (Chaartash) ranges, entering the Toguz-Toro Depression, where it again divides into multiple channels separated by gravel islands and sandy bars.

In the western part of the Toguz-Toro Depression, the Kökirim (left tributary) joins the river, which then flows northward through a 40-km-long gorge between the Moldo Too and Kökirim ranges. After leaving the gorge, the Naryn is joined by its largest tributary, the Kökömeren, and continues westward through a narrow, terraced valley, widening to 100–150 m.

Farther west, the valley opens into the Ketmen-Töbö Valley, where the Chychkan and Uzunakmat rivers join the Naryn. The river then flows southwestward for about 100 km through an antecedent valley separating the At-Oynok and Fergana Ranges, before turning south, widening, and receiving the Karasuu (right tributary). Upon entering the Fergana Valley, the Naryn merges with the Kara Darya, forming the Syr Darya.

== Tributaries ==
The main tributaries of the Naryn are, from source to mouth:

- Kichi-Naryn (right)
- On-Archa (right)
- At-Bashy (left)
- Kajyrty (right)
- Ala-Buga (left)
- Kökirim (left)
- Kökömeren (right)
- Chychkan (right)
- Uzun-Akmat (right)
- Kara-Suu (right)

== Settlements ==
Some places along the river: Kyrgyzstan: Kara-Say (see Barskoon), Naryn Region, Naryn, Dostuk, Jalal-Abad Region, Kazarman, Toktogul Reservoir, Kara-Köl, Tash-Kömür.

== See also ==
- Karabulun Hydro Power Plant
