= List of mountain ranges in Kyrgyzstan =

Mountain ranges occupy the greater part of the territory of Kyrgyzstan (60–65%). In several parts of the country, major nodal mountain uplifts occur, including Khan Tengri and Jengish Chokusu, the Ak-Shyyrak, Chilik–Kemin, Talas–Chatkal, Machin, and other massifs. These nodal uplifts, as well as the watershed sections of most mountain ranges, are covered by extensive glaciation. Overall, most ranges in the Tien-Shan are uneven in shape, with one side differing from the other, and this imbalance can vary even within the same mountain range.

Based on their orientation and mutual arrangement, the mountain ranges and mountains of Kyrgyzstan are grouped into six orographic regions: Central Tien-Shan, Northern Tien-Shan, Inner Tien-Shan, Western Tien-Shan, and Southern Tien-Shan. In addition, the Pamir–Alay orographic region, which belongs to the Pamir mountain system, is represented within Kyrgyzstan by the northern slope of the Trans-Alay (Chon-Alay) Range and the Alay Depression.

A list of mountain ranges in Kyrgyzstan includes 158 mountain ranges in Central Tien-Shan (16), Northern Tien-Shan (19), Inner Tien-Shan (48), Western Tien-Shan (30), South Tien-Shan (41), and Pamir-Alay (4).

== Mountain Ranges of Central Tien-Shan ==
The Central Tien-Shan is characterized by the highest elevations, extensive glaciation covering about 40% of its total area, and the dominance of nival–glacial geomorphic processes. The mountain ranges are closely spaced and dissected by narrow valleys.

Range	Maximum height, m	Highest peak	Length of range, km	Maximum width of range, km
Adyr-Ter	4550		34	8
Ak-Shyrak Massif	5125		60	28
At-Jayloo	4477		36	9
Ashuu-Ter			32	15
Boz-Kyr			38	7
Kayingdy	5784		78	14
Kakshaal Too	7439	Jengish Chokusu	582	54
Kan Too	6995	Khan Tengri	38	9
Keykap	5100		18	7
Keolyu	5281	Sovietskaya Konstitutsiya Peak	52	21
May-Bash	5361		22	16
Meridianalyi		Druzhba Peak	22(in Kyrgyzstan)	40
Sary Jazz	5816	Semenov Peak	93 (in Kyrgyzstan)	16
Terekti	4930		48	11
Engilchek Too	5722	Shokal'skiy Peak	60	12
Eshekart Range	4384		50	12

== Mountain Ranges of Northern Tien-Shan ==
The Northern Tien-Shan forms a series of mountain ranges that curve gently toward the south. These ranges are strongly shaped by erosion, with many ancient, once-flat surfaces now exposed again.

Range	Maximum height, m	Highest peak	Length of range, km	Maximum width of range, km
Arpa-Tektir			25	9
Trans-Ili Alatau	4973	Talgar Peak	120(in Kyrgyzstan)	30
Kalba-Too	4146	Atchypas Peak	25	14
Karagatty		Semenov Peak	93 (in Kyrgyzstan)	16
Kara Jylga			28	7
Kastek Range	2782		32 (in Kyrgyzstan)	10
Kemin Range	3884		36	10
Kyrgyz Ala-Too	4895	Semenova Tian-Shanski Peak	454	40
Koshoy Too	3921		36	8
Kuru Ayryk			26	9
Kyzyl Ompol	3183		20	13
Kylak Bulak			32	7
Kyumyushtak			36	18
Kyungey Ala-Too	4770	Chok-Tal Peak	285	32
Oktorkoy	3125	Cholok Peak	30	7
Ortok Too	2501	Shumkar Peak	35	8
Sary Jon	3230		30	9
Talas Ala-Too Range	4482	Manas Peak	260	40
Echkili Too	2160		42	9

== Mountain Ranges of Inner Tien-Shan ==
The mountain ranges of the Inner Tien-Shan, branching off from the Central Tien-Shan as distinct spurs, gradually diverge, widening westward and gently curving southward. This area contains the most widespread remnants of ancient denudation surfaces.

Range	Maximum height, m	Highest peak	Length of range, km	Maximum width of range, km
Ak Shyyrak Range	4037		40	10
Alamyshyk Too	3399		20	5
At-Bashy Range	4801	Pik Rhianydd	140	30
Acha Tash Range	3975		36	13
Baybiche Too	4337		140	13
Baydulu Range	4146	Onarcha Peak	46	11
Bauk Range	3388		28	8
Boor Albas Range	3980	Itelgi Uya	20	10
Borkoldoy Too	5170	Jagalmay	90	34
Jaman-Too	4737		70	16
Jer Range	4844		104	17
Jetim-Bel Range	4627	Seok	102	12
Jetim Range	4896		120	24
Jumgal Too	4281	Kara Moynok	54	15
Itelgi Uya Range	3812		20	6
Kabak Too	4144	Kashkasuu	40	16
Kapka Tash Range	4146		40	10
Karagatty	3805		24	7
Kara Jorgo Range	3933		66	12
Kara Kaman Range	4343		56	14
Karakoo Junay Range			10	7
Kara Kyr Range	4100		22	4
Kara Kyungey Range	3800		22	7
Kara Moynok Range	4281	Kara Moynok	64	16
Kara Too	4066		26	6
Karacha Too			20	5
Kekkirim Too	4351	Baidamtal	60	38
Kek Kyya Range	4960		20	14
Kerpe Too	4552		36	18
Kyzart Too	4400		30	16
Moldo Too	4185		110	26
Naryn Too	4499	Orto-Acha Mountain	120	18
Nura Range	4460		45	24
Oy Kayyng Range	4273		36	20
Sandyk Range	3947		50	12
Sarykamysh Range	4042		39	17
Songköl Too	3856		92	9
Suusamyr Too	4048		126	31
Taktalyk Range	3908		54	6
Tastar Ata Range	3847		24	4
Tegerek Range	3000		20	5
Teskey Ala-Too	5216	Karakol Peak	354	40
Torugart Range	5108		64	20
Ukek Range	4356		30	20
Ulan Range	4542		56	7
Uch Emchek Peak			54	18
Chaar Tash Range			20	6
Chakyr Korum Range	4558		30	8

== Mountain Ranges of Western Tien-Shan ==
Unlike most other mountain regions, which mainly run east–west, the mountain ranges of the Western Tien-Shan extend in northwest and northeast directions.

Range	Maximum height, m	Highest peak	Length of range, km	Maximum width of range, km
Alash Too	3574		20	8
At Oynok Range	3896		70	16
Babash Ata Range	4427	Babash Ata	54	8
Bozbu Too	2875		30	14
Jalgyz Kyr Range			20	5
Donguz-Too (range)	2354		28	6
Isfan Jayloo Range	3701		34	6
Kadoo Range			20	6
Kara Kyr Range	4634	Kashka Suu	36	12
Kardy Too	4129		31	7
Kachura Range	4497		34	10
Kenkol Range			26	5
Kök-Suu Range	3828	Chatyr Debe	60	15
Kochkor Dobo Range	2534		21	6
Kulun Range			30	10
Kuramy Range	3769		30	25
Kuturgan Range			24	5
Pskem Range	4395		120	20
Sary Jon Range			24	5
Seruyun Dobo Range	2469		30	12
Suuk Range	2991		22	6
Ters Range	3890		30	16
Toguz Bulak Range			20	7
Uzgen Range	4381		56	26
Uzun Akmat Range	4165		40	14
Fergana Range	4893	Uch-Seit	206	62
Chaar Tash Range	3143		20	7
Chandalash Range	4114		72	10
Chatkal Range	4503		165	30
Chong Boor Too	3907		42	10

== Mountain Ranges of South Tien-Shan ==
The Southern Tien Shan, like the Northern Tien Shan, is made up of mountain ranges that have been strongly shaped by erosion, with remnants of ancient flattened land surfaces preserved on ridges and between valleys.

Range	Maximum height, m	Highest peak	Length of range, km	Maximum width of range, km
Adygine Too	3852		30	6
Akademik Adyshev Range	4745	Akademik Adyshev Peak	110	50
Ak-Tash Range, Alay	4249		20	1
Ak-Tash Range, Turkestan			20	9
Ak-Ter Range	4501		50	11
Akun-Too	3870		21	5
Ak-Changyl Range	4044		32	10
Alaykuu Range			100	15
Alay Range	5539	Peak Tandykul	350	20
Almaly Range	1935		20	6
Bali-Synyk Range	1571		26	11
Gauzan Range	3273		24	6
Daud Range			21	6
Joo-Jatty Range	4048		20	9
Kara-Bel Range	5621	Skalistyi Peak	20	9
Katyrang-Too	3375		44	8
Kek-Bel Range			22	5
Kek-Bulak Range	4039		22	7
Kekche-Too			21	6
Keldyuk-Too	5016		31	7
Kichik Alay Range	4933		26	10
Kek Tumshuk Range	5459		78	20
Kollektorskiy Range	5259		55	15
Kum-Bel Range	4000		21	8
Kuruk-Say Range	5147		31	5
Kyrk-Karakchy Range	2272		22	5
Ming-Teke Range	4432		28	8
Olokon-Too	4629		34	10
Sary-Tash Range			20	8
Taldyk Range			26	7
Tekelik Range	5127	Aydarbek Peak	27	12
Tekesekirdi-Bel Range	2913		20	6
Terek-Too		Ytyk Peak	60	3
Teskey Range			27	9
Tokhtabuz Range	2650		28	5
Turkestan Range	5509	Pik Piramidalny	300	30
Tuyuk-Suu Range	4549		32	16
Uluu-Too	1635		30	9
Uu-Saz Range	2614		26	10
Chakan-Tash Range	4323		21	8
Chil-Ustun Range	1459		20	5
Yaruntus Range	3670		23	7

== Pamir-Alay ==
The Alay region is markedly uplifted. Lenin Peak in the Trans-Alay (Chon-Alay) Range reaches an elevation of 7,134 m above sea level. This powerful uplift occurred over a relatively short geological period compared with other regions. As a result, the structure of the range includes not only Paleozoic and Mesozoic rocks, but also Cenozoic deposits. The range is dissected by numerous trough (glacial) valleys and is covered by extensive glaciers and snowfields.

Range	Maximum height, m	Highest peak	Length of range, km	Maximum width of range, km
Achyk Tash Range	5920		21	6
Trans-Alay Range	7134	Lenin Peak	250	40
Kek Tumshuk Range	5459	Ledyanoy Mys Peak	26	10
Putoo Range	4139		22	5
