= Ming-Kush Valley =

- Location within Kyrgyzstan
- Floor elevation: 1,400–3,300 m (4,600–10,800 ft)
- Length: 30 km (19 mi) North-South
- Width: 2 km (1.2 mi)

Geography
- Country: Kyrgyzstan
- State/Province: Naryn Region
- District: Jumgal District
- Coordinates: 41°40′N 74°29′E
- Interactive map of Ming-Kush Valley

The Ming-Kush Valley (Kyrgyz: Миңкуш өрөөнү) is a valley located in Jumgal District of Naryn Region in central Kyrgyzstan. It is separated from the Naryn river valley to the south by the Moldo Too range. The Kabak Too range lies to its north. The valley is 30 km (19 mi) long and 2 km (1.2 mi) wide. The river Ming-Kush (a left tributary of the Kökömeren) flows through it, and the main settlement is the village Ming-Kush. Coal deposits in the valley have been exploited since the 1950s.
