= Karakeche =

Coal mining area in Kyrgyzstan

Coordinates: 41°42′36″N 74°45′36″E

Location of Karakeche in Kyrgyzstan

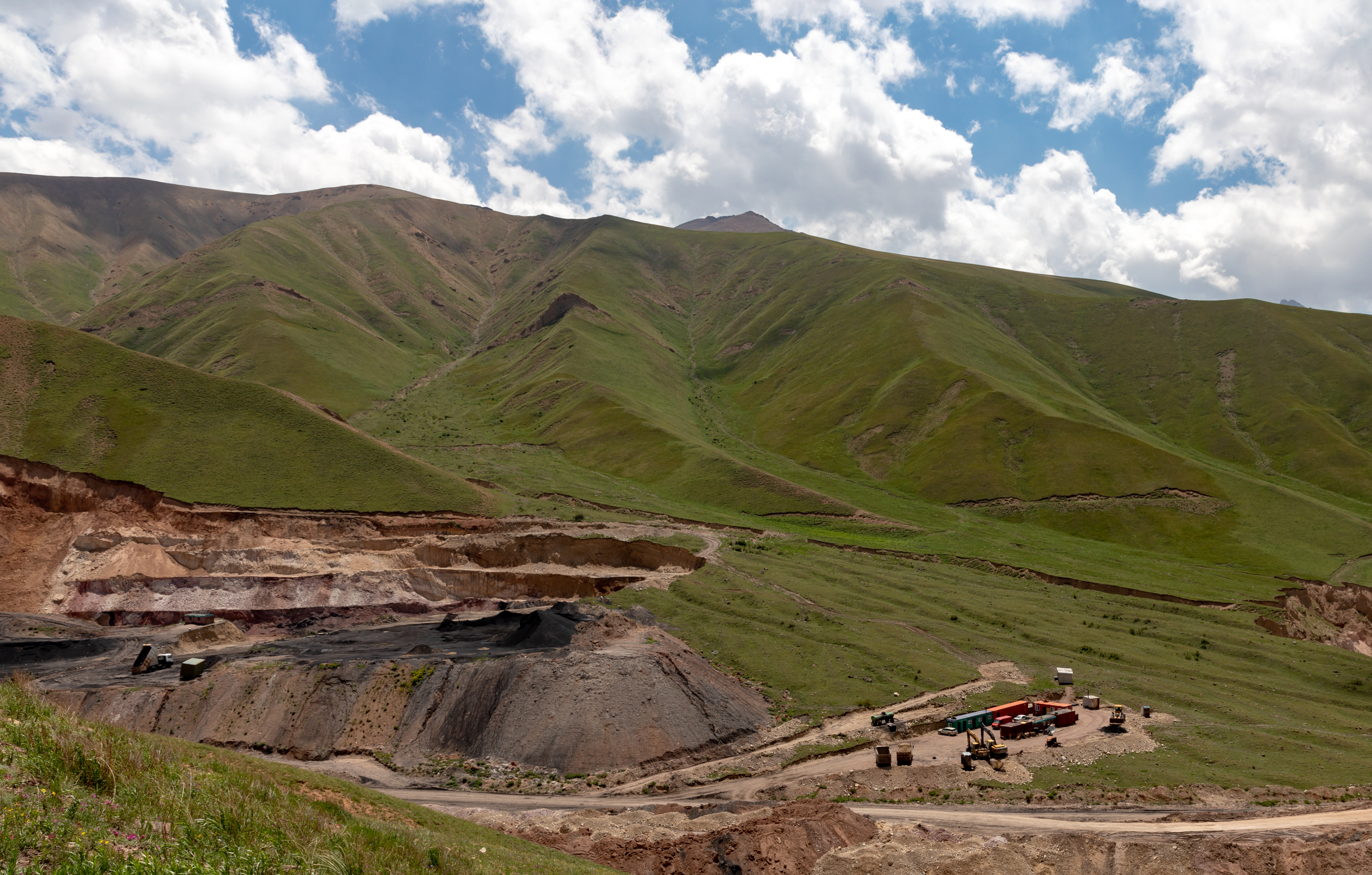
Coal mine in Karakeche, Naryn region

Karakeche (Kyrgyz: Каракече, also Kara-Keche) is a coal mining area in Jumgal District, Naryn Region, Kyrgyzstan. It is located in the valley of the river Karakeche (Naryn basin), between the mountain ranges Moldo Too and Kabak Too, 25–30 km south of Chaek. It is the site of five open cast coal mines, source of around half of Kyrgyzstan's national coal production with estimated reserves of 438 million tonnes. This coal is mostly sent to Bishkek via the railway at Balykchy. The extension of that railway all the way to Karakeche was proposed in 2013 while other reports have suggested that the mines might be offered to China in return for the construction of a trans-Kyrgyzstan railway linking Andijan, Uzbekistan with Kashgar, China.

On 31 March 2022, President Sadyr Japarov officially launched construction of the new 186 km railway from Balykchy to Karakeche.

== History ==
The Kara-Keche mines were developed during the Soviet era, with first production in 1985. After independence they were partly privatised, though the main mine remained under the 70% state-owned firm Ak-Ulak. According to news reports, local people believed that smaller privately owned operating companies, Joldoshbaev's Besh-Sary, Isabaev's Meerim-Sharbon and Sasykulov Ak-Jol, had asset stripped their respective operations and made little attempt to comply with basic financial or environmental standards. Whether or not this was true, the mines were dramatically seized on 6 June 2005 by people claiming allegiance to the Joomart movement of Jumgal politician Nurlan Motuev, in what Motuev reportedly described as an attempt at redistribution of wealth relevant to the March revolution. Motuev later served a prison sentence for the seizure, and in 2012 called for the mines' nationalisation.
