= Bash-Kuugandy Köl =

- Kyrgyz: Баш-Кууганды
- Interactive map of Bash-Kuugandy Köl
- Location: Jumgal District, Naryn Region, Kyrgyzstan
- Coordinates: 42°10′21″N 74°41′26″E
- Primary outflows: seepage through the natural dam
- Basin countries: Kyrgyzstan
- Surface area: 0.264 km (0.164 mi)
- Max. depth: 22 m (72 ft)
- Water volume: 1.72×10^{6} m^{3} (6.1×10^{7} ft^{3})
- Surface elevation: 2,860 m (9,380 ft)

Bash-Kuugandy Köl (Kyrgyz: Баш-Кууганды or Kyrgyz: Башкууганды) is a mountain lake in Kyrgyzstan, located in the Inner Tien Shan in the basin of the Bash-Kuugandy River, a right tributary of the Jumgal. It lies on the southern slope of the Jumgal Too.

== Geography ==
The lake occupies the floor of a basin-like valley at an elevation of 2,860 m above sea level.

== Hydrology ==
- Area: 0.264 km^{2}
- Water volume: 1.72 million m^{3}
- Maximum depth: 22 m

The lake was formed by the damming of the Kol River, which flows through the valley. Water does not flow directly out of the lake, but instead seeps through beneath the natural dam. The water level fluctuates by up to 4–5 m.

== Physical characteristics ==
The lake has a yellowish-green color and a transparency of about 3.5 m. Fish are present in the lake.

== Use ==
During the irrigation season, water from the lake is diverted into the Bash-Kuugandy River.
