= Karakeche (river) =

River in Kyrgyzstan

- Native name: Каракече (Kyrgyz)

Location
- Country: Kyrgyzstan
- Region: Naryn Region

Physical characteristics
- Source
  - location: Northern slope of the Moldo Too
- Mouth: Jumgal
- Length: 45 km (28 mi)
- Basin size: 184 km^{2} (71 sq mi)
- Discharge
  - average: 1.1 to 1.5 m^{3}/s (39 to 53 cu ft/s)

The Karakeche (Kyrgyz: Каракече), also spelled Kara-Keche, is a river in Kyrgyzstan. It is a left tributary of the Jumgal, although its water is diverted for irrigation before reaching that river. It is 45 kilometres (28 mi) long and drains a basin of 184 square kilometres (71 sq mi).

== Course ==
The Karakeche originates on the northern slope of the Moldo Too and flows northwards. Its valley is relatively narrow in the upper reaches and widens downstream. In its lower reaches, the channel divides into branches and the surrounding area is marshy. Its water is diverted for irrigation before reaching the Jumgal.

== Hydrology ==
The river is 45 kilometres (28 mi) long and has a drainage basin of 184 square kilometres (71 sq mi). Its mean annual discharge is 1.1 to 1.5 cubic metres per second (39 to 53 cu ft/s). Discharge is highest in June and July and lowest in December and January. Water levels begin to rise in May and recede in September.

== Environmental issues ==
A study published in 2022 identified mining waste dumps and windblown coal dust from the Kara-Keche lignite deposit as sources of pollution in local watercourses.

In September 2020, a large landslide blocked the Karakeche river channel, damaged power lines and obstructed the Dyikan–Kara-Keche road. No casualties were reported.
