= Kagoy =

Kagoy may refer to:

- Qəğoy, Azerbaijan
- Këkoy, Kyrgyzstan
