= Köbük-Suu =

River in Kyrgyzstan

- Location within Kyrgyzstan
- Native name: Көбүксуу (Kyrgyz)

Location
- Country: Kyrgyzstan
- Region: Naryn Region
- District: Jumgal District

Physical characteristics
- Source: Southern slopes of Suusamyr Too and northern slopes of Sarykamysh Range
  - location: Jumgal District
- Mouth: Kökömeren
  - coordinates: 41°43′53.11″N 73°54′32.39″E
  - elevation: 1,155 m (3,789 ft)
- Length: 35 km (22 mi)
- Basin size: 398 km^{2} (154 sq mi)
- Discharge
  - average: 9.4 m^{3}/s (330 cu ft/s)

Basin features
- Progression: Kökömeren→ Naryn→ Syr Darya→ North Aral Sea

The Köbük-Suu (Kyrgyz: Көбүксуу) is a river in the Inner Tien Shan of Kyrgyzstan. It flows through Jumgal District in Naryn Region and is a right tributary of the Kökömeren. The river is 35 kilometres (22 mi) long and has a drainage basin of 398 square kilometres (154 sq mi).

== Geography ==
The Köbük-Suu originates on the southern slopes of the Suusamyr Too and the northern slopes of the Sarykamysh Range. The river flows into the Kökömeren at an elevation of approximately 1,155 m above sea level.

The average elevation of the drainage basin is approximately 2,800 m. The Köbük-Suu has 52 tributaries, and glaciers within its basin cover a total area of 2.7 km^{2} (1.0 sq mi).

== Hydrology ==
The river is fed primarily by snowmelt and glacial meltwater. Its mean annual discharge is 9.4 cubic metres per second (330 cu ft/s), with a specific discharge of 23.6 L/s/km^{2}. The highest flows occur in July, while the lowest occur in February.

== See also ==
- Kökömeren
- Naryn (river)
- Sarykamysh Range
