= Kabak =

Kabak or Qabaq may refer to:

== People ==
- Aaron Abraham Kabak (1881-1944), Russian Empire born Israeli Hebrew language author
- Berfin Kabak, Turkish female boxer
- Carrie Kabak, an author and former children's book illustrator
- Doğan Kabak, Turkish rally drive
- Kostyantyn Kabak (1924–1998), Soviet and Ukrainian medical doctor, professor, histologist, and embryologist
- Nikolai Kabak (1904–1979), World War II soldier, Hero of the Soviet Union
- Nistor Kabak (1913–1937), Moldovan Soviet poet
- Ozan Kabak, Turkish footballer

== Places ==
- Kabak, Issyk-Kul Region, village in Kyrgyzstan
- Kabak (river), River in Krasnodar Krai, Russia
- Kabak, Seben, village in Turkey
- Kabak Too (Kabak Mountains), Kyrgyzstan

== Other ==
- A type of shooting in Turkish archery
- Kabak kemane, a kind of violin
- Kabak, another name for binangkal, a Philippine doughnut
- Kabak (tavern), a type of tavern in Russian Tsardom ad Russian Empire
- Kebek, a.k.a. Kabak (died 1325/1326), Khan of the Chagatai Khanate

== See also ==
- Kabakov
