= Keng-Suu =

Keng-Suu may refer to the following villages in Kyrgyzstan:

- Keng-Suu, Tüp
- another name for Tölök, Kochkor District, Naryn Region
- Keng-Suu, Jumgal
