= Suusamyr Valley =

Valley in Kyrgyzstan

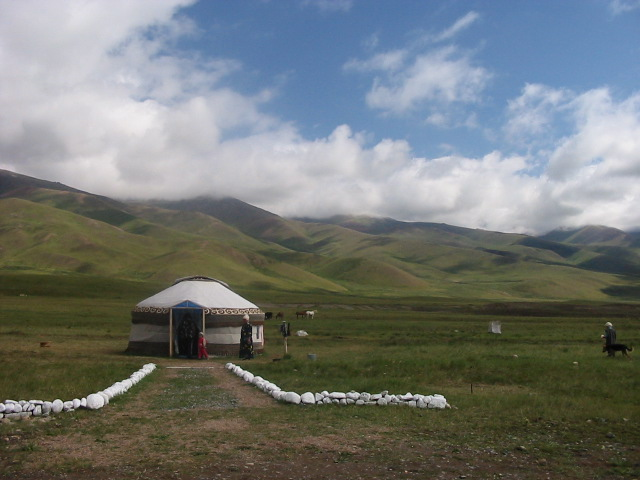
- Yurt in Suusamyr Valley
- Area: 4,300 km^{2} (1,700 mi^{2})

Naming
- Native name: Суусамыр өрөөнү (Kyrgyz)

Geography
- Country: Kyrgyzstan
- Coordinates: 42.1941°N 73.5612°E
- River: Suusamyr
- Interactive map of Suusamyr Valley

Suusamyr Valley stretches for 150 km from west (from Alabel Pass at an altitude of 3,184 m) to east (up to Karakol Pass at 3,452 m). Its area is 4,300 km^{2} (1,700 sq mi). The section from the confluence of the Ötmök and Suusamyr rivers to the mouth of the Joojyurok valley (or where the Sokuuluk river flows into Western Karakol) is wide and flat, extending for 80–85 km. The widest part — at the point where Töö Ashuu and the highest peak of the Suusamyr Too (4,048 m) face each other (at the head of Üchömchök) — is 45 km wide. The valley gradually narrows and rises in elevation as it moves westward. The valley is located in Chüy Region of Kyrgyzstan.

== Etymology ==
Possibly derived from Sygun Samur, a place name recorded by Mahmud al-Kashgari in the 11th-century Dīwān Lughāt al-Turk. According to one interpretation, samur is an Iranian word meaning "beaver" or "otter", and the name Suusamyr may therefore mean "water beaver" (Kyrgyz: suu samyry ). In modern geographical usage, the name Suusamyr refers not only to the valley but also to several related geographic features in Kyrgyzstan, including the Suusamyr Too, Suusamyr Pass, and Suusamyr River.

== Geography ==
According to its relief, the Suusamyr Valley is divided into three parts:

1. The western part — Dubankechüü Valley,
2. The central Suusamyr Valley,
3. The Western Karakol Valley.

The Dubankechüü Valley occupies the upper reaches of Suusamyr, extending from the place where the Korumdu and Aygyrjal mountains converge and the valley narrows. The valley floor is flat and slightly sloping; it lies at an elevation of 2,300–3,000 m. The sides are steep, especially the southern slopes of the Talas Ala-Too.

The central Suusamyr Valley is wide and resembles a triangle in appearance. Only the eastern side of the triangle is slightly inclined inward due to the western spur of the Jumgal Too — the Kindik Mountains. On this side, the slopes of the Suusamyr Range are very steep. The floor of the central part is a plain with small hills and mounds. There are also terraces along the rivers. The relief, soil, and climatic conditions of this part of the valley are suitable for farming.

The Western Karakol Valley is located to the east of Suusamyr, between the Kyrgyz Ala-Too Range and the Karamoynok, Jumgal, and Kindik mountains. Compared to other parts, it is narrower, with steep sides and a valley floor lying at an elevation of 2,100–3,000 m.

On the eastern side, the valley narrows significantly and splits into two branches (the headwaters of Western Söök and Karakol). Southeast of the Kindik Mountains, the Joojyurok Valley stretches from northeast to southwest at an altitude of 2,000–3,000 meters.

== Geology ==
Geologically, the Suusamyr Valley is composed of sandstones, conglomerates, and red-colored clays dating back to the Cenozoic era. The valley floor and the gently sloping foothill plains are predominantly covered with sands and clays from the Quaternary period. The valley’s primary tectonic formation is characterized by a synclinal structure.

== Hydrology ==
The river Suusamyr flows through Suusamyr Valley.

== Climate ==
The climate of the Suusamyr Valley is continental. In summer, air temperatures can reach up to 30°C, while in winter they may drop to –40°C to –45°C. The average temperature in January is –20 to –21°C, and in July, it is 13–14°C. In summer, dew often falls at night, and frosts may also occur. Annual precipitation is between 350–370 mm (255 mm in dry years, and up to 500 mm during wet periods). About 63% of annual precipitation falls between March and July. Winters are long (5–6 months) with heavy snowfall (up to 1 meter). Winds predominantly blow from the west and northwest.

== Landscapes ==
The valley is predominantly used as "alpine summer pastures full of herbs and wild flowers – carpeting the valley floor in many colours."

Depending on the relief, elevation, and climatic conditions, the Suusamyr Valley is characterized by the following landscape zones:

1. Feather grass and wormwood dry steppe (at elevations of 2000–2200 m) — occupies the flat areas along both banks of the Suusamyr River and the foothills. The soils are light brown and brown. Vegetation covers 50–70% of the soil surface; the rest is bare.
2. Feather grass–alkali grass steppe and mixed herb (sedge, wild thyme, bindweed)–grass (including feather grass, etc.) meadow steppe (2200–2600 m). The soil is dark brown or chestnut, rich in humus.
3. Subalpine meadow dominated by grasses (such as wild rye, foxtail, mountain oats, etc.) and diverse herbs (up to 3000–3100 m). The soil is meadow black or dark-colored.
4. Feather grass–fescue and mixed herb alpine meadow (up to 3500–3700 m). These are mountain meadows and meadow-steppes with stony, humus-rich soils.
5. Glacial-nival zone (above 3500–3700 m) — characterized by gravelly surfaces, rocky ridges, scree slopes, glaciers, permanent snow that does not melt, and sharply rising high peaks.

== Settlements ==
The valley includes the settlements of Kozhomkul, Tunuk, Ülgü, Birinchi May, Kaysar, and Suusamyr.

== Infrastructure ==
Bishkek — Osh (M41) (European route E010) road enters the valley at the tunnel under Töö Ashuu Pass and leaves it at Ala-Bel Pass.
