= Sandyk Range =

Mountain range in Kyrgyzstan

- Location within Kyrgyzstan

Highest point
- Elevation: 3,947 m (12,949 ft)

Dimensions
- Length: 50 km (31 mi) E-W
- Width: 12 km (7.5 mi) N-S

Naming
- Native name: Сандык кырка тоосу (Kyrgyz)

Geography
- Country: Kyrgyzstan
- Region: Naryn Province
- District(s): Kochkor District, Jumgal District
- Range coordinates: 42°12′53″N 74°42′20″E

The Sandyk Range (Kyrgyz: Сандык кырка тоосу) is a range in the inner Tien Shan, Kyrgyzstan to the east of Jumgal Too. It is located in Jumgal and Kochkor districts of Naryn Region. The length of the range is 50 kilometres (31 mi) and the width - 12 kilometres (7.5 mi). The average altitude is about 3,570 metres (11,710 ft) and the highest peak - 3,947 metres (12,949 ft). The range descends from the west to the east transforming to adyrs (low foothills) in Kochkor Valley. The northern slope is short and steep, and dissected by small gorges. Tributaries of the Kochkor (river) and Jumgal rivers took its rise in the range.
