= Ming-Kush (river) =

Ming-Kush or Mingkush
- Native name: Миңкуш (Kyrgyz)

Location
- Country: Kyrgyzstan

Physical characteristics
- Source: Moldo Too
  - location: Jumgal District
- Mouth: Kökömeren
  - coordinates: 41°45′10″N 74°15′18″E
- Length: 47 km (29 mi)
- Basin size: 728 km^{2} (281 sq mi)
- Discharge
  - average: 1.12 m^{3}/s (40 cu ft/s)

Basin features
- Progression: Kökömeren→ Naryn→ Syr Darya→ North Aral Sea
- Tributaries
  - left: Dyunureme
  - right: Chong-Tash

The Ming-Kush (Kyrgyz: Миңкуш or Миң-Куш; Russian: Мин-Куш) is a river in Jumgal District of Naryn Region of Kyrgyzstan. It rises on north slopes of Moldo Too and flows into Kökömeren river from the left. The length of the river is 47 km (29 mi) and the basin area 728 square kilometres (280 mi^{2}). Average annual discharge is 1.12 m^{3}/s (40 cu ft/s). The maximum discharge is in June - July and the minimum in January - February. The river is majorly fed by springs (42%), glaciers (28%) and snow (25.4%).
