= Ming-Kush =

Ming-Kush Миң-Куш
- Location within Kyrgyzstan
- Coordinates: 41°40′48″N 74°27′36″E
- Country: Kyrgyzstan
- Region: Naryn
- District: Jumgal
- urban-type settlement: 1953
- Elevation: 2,260 m (7,410 ft)

Population (2021)
  - Total: 3,647
- Time zone: UTC+6

Ming-Kush (Kyrgyz: Миң-Куш, lit. 'a thousand birds') is a village (urban-type settlement from 1953 until 2012) in the Jumgal District of Naryn Region of Kyrgyzstan. Its population was 3,647 in 2021. It is located in the narrow Ming-Kush Valley on the right bank of the river Ming-Kush, about 45 km (28 mi) south of Chaek. It is the site of a former uranium mine.

== Population ==
Historical population
Year	Pop.	±% p.a.
1970	6,134	—
1979	8,544	+3.75%
1989	8,377	−0.20%
1999	4,760	−5.50%
2009	3,353	−3.44%
2021	3,647	+0.70%
Note: resident population; Sources:
