= Kyzart =

Kyzart Кызарт
- Location within Kyrgyzstan
- Coordinates: 42°1′50″N 74°59′0″E
- Country: Kyrgyzstan
- Region: Naryn Region
- District: Jumgal District

Population (2021)
  - Total: 1,516
- Time zone: UTC+6

Kyzart (Kyrgyz: Кызарт) is a village in Naryn Region of Kyrgyzstan. It is part of the Jumgal District. Its population was 1,516 in 2021.
