= Orto-Tokoy =

Orto-Tokoy Орто-Токой
- Location within Kyrgyzstan
- Coordinates: 42°20′24″N 76°1′12″E
- Country: Kyrgyzstan
- Region: Issyk-Kul Region
- City: Balykchy
- Elevation: 1,834 m (6,017 ft)

Population (2021)
  - Total: 491
- Time zone: UTC+6

Orto-Tokoy (Kyrgyz: Орто-Токой) is an urban-type settlement in the Issyk-Kul Region of Kyrgyzstan, just north of the A365 highway between Kochkor and Balykchy. Its population was 491 in 2021. Administratively, it is part of the city of Balykchy. It is on the east-flowing part of the upper river Chu, downstream from the Orto-Tokoy Reservoir and dam.

== Population ==
Historical population
Year	Pop.	±% p.a.
1970	445	—
1979	398	−1.23%
1989	601	+4.21%
1999	605	+0.07%
2009	495	−1.99%
2021	491	−0.07%
Note: resident population; Sources:
