= Tabylgyty =

Tabylgyty Kyrgyz: Табылгыты
- Location within Kyrgyzstan
- Coordinates: 41°43′20″N 74°12′20″E
- Country: Kyrgyzstan
- Region: Naryn
- District: Jumgal
- Elevation: 1,450 m (4,760 ft)

Population (2021)
  - Total: 517
- Time zone: UTC+6

Tabylgyty (Kyrgyz: Табылгыты) is a village in Naryn Region, Kyrgyzstan. It is part of the Jumgal District. Its population was 517 in 2021.
