= Bash-Kuugandy =

Bash-Kuugandy Баш-Кууганды
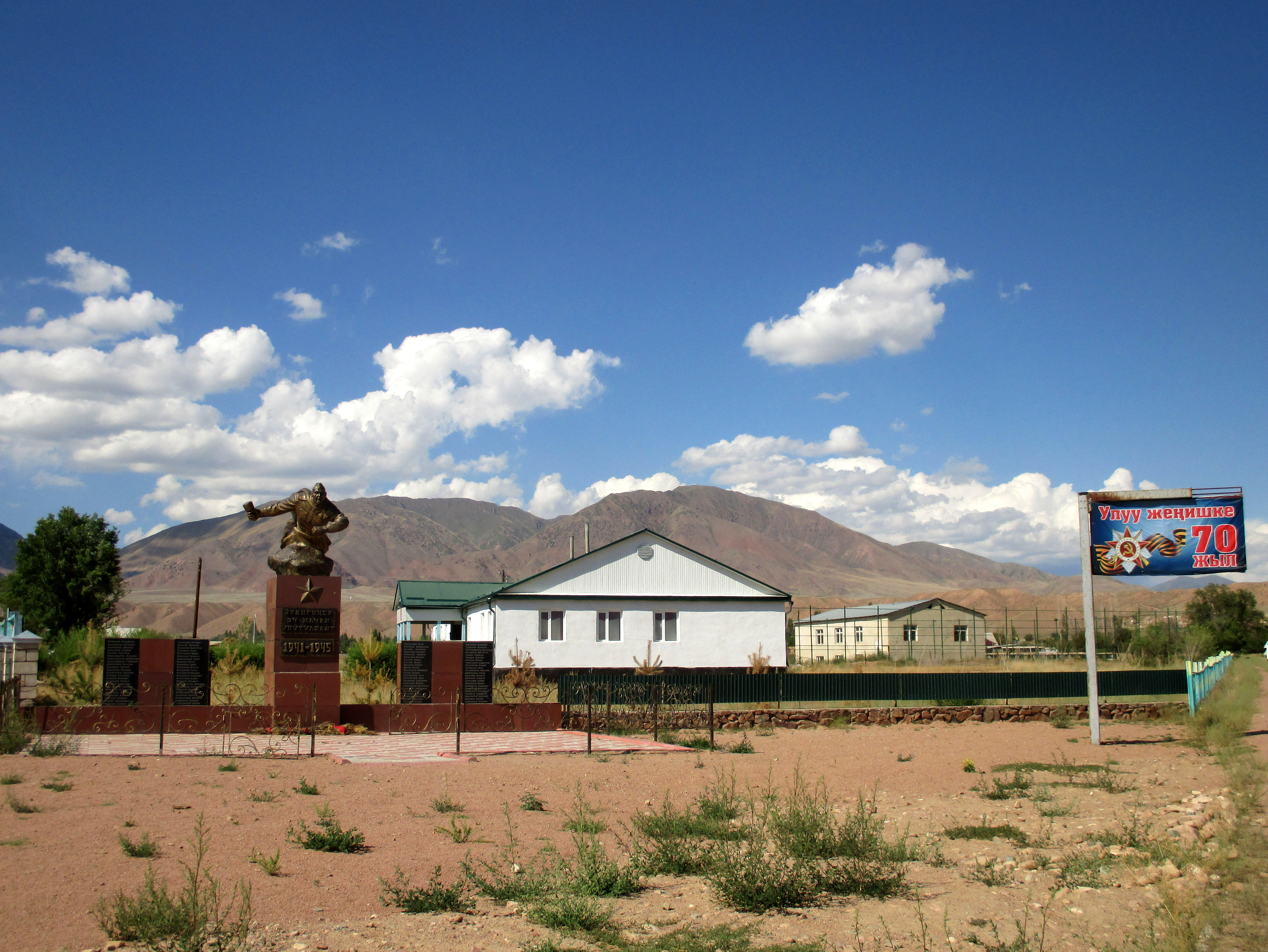

- Location within Kyrgyzstan
- Coordinates: 42°0′10″N 74°39′20″E
- Country: Kyrgyzstan
- Region: Naryn Region
- District: Jumgal District

Population (2021)
  - Total: 3,218
- Time zone: UTC+6

Bash-Kuugandy is a village in Naryn Region of Kyrgyzstan. It is part of the Jumgal District. Its population was 3,218 in 2021.
