= Sary-Bulung =

Sary-Bulung Kyrgyz: Сары-Булуң
- Location within Kyrgyzstan
- Coordinates: 41°44′30″N 74°16′50″E
- Country: Kyrgyzstan
- Region: Naryn
- District: Jumgal
- Elevation: 1,560 m (5,120 ft)

Population (2021)
  - Total: 298
- Time zone: UTC+6

Sary-Bulung (Kyrgyz: Сары-Булуң) is a village in Naryn Region, Kyrgyzstan. It is part of the Jumgal District. Its population was 298 in 2021.
