= Chong-Döbö =

Chong-Döbö Чоң-Дөбө
- Location within Kyrgyzstan
- Coordinates: 41°43′48″N 74°7′48″E
- Country: Kyrgyzstan
- Region: Naryn Region
- District: Jumgal District
- Elevation: 1,678 m (5,505 ft)

Population (2021)
  - Total: 1,445
- Time zone: UTC+6

Chong-Döbö (Kyrgyz: Чоң-Дөбө) is a village in Naryn Region, Kyrgyzstan. It is part of the Jumgal District. Its population was 1,445 in 2021.
