= Kochkor =

Kochkor Kyrgyz: Кочкор
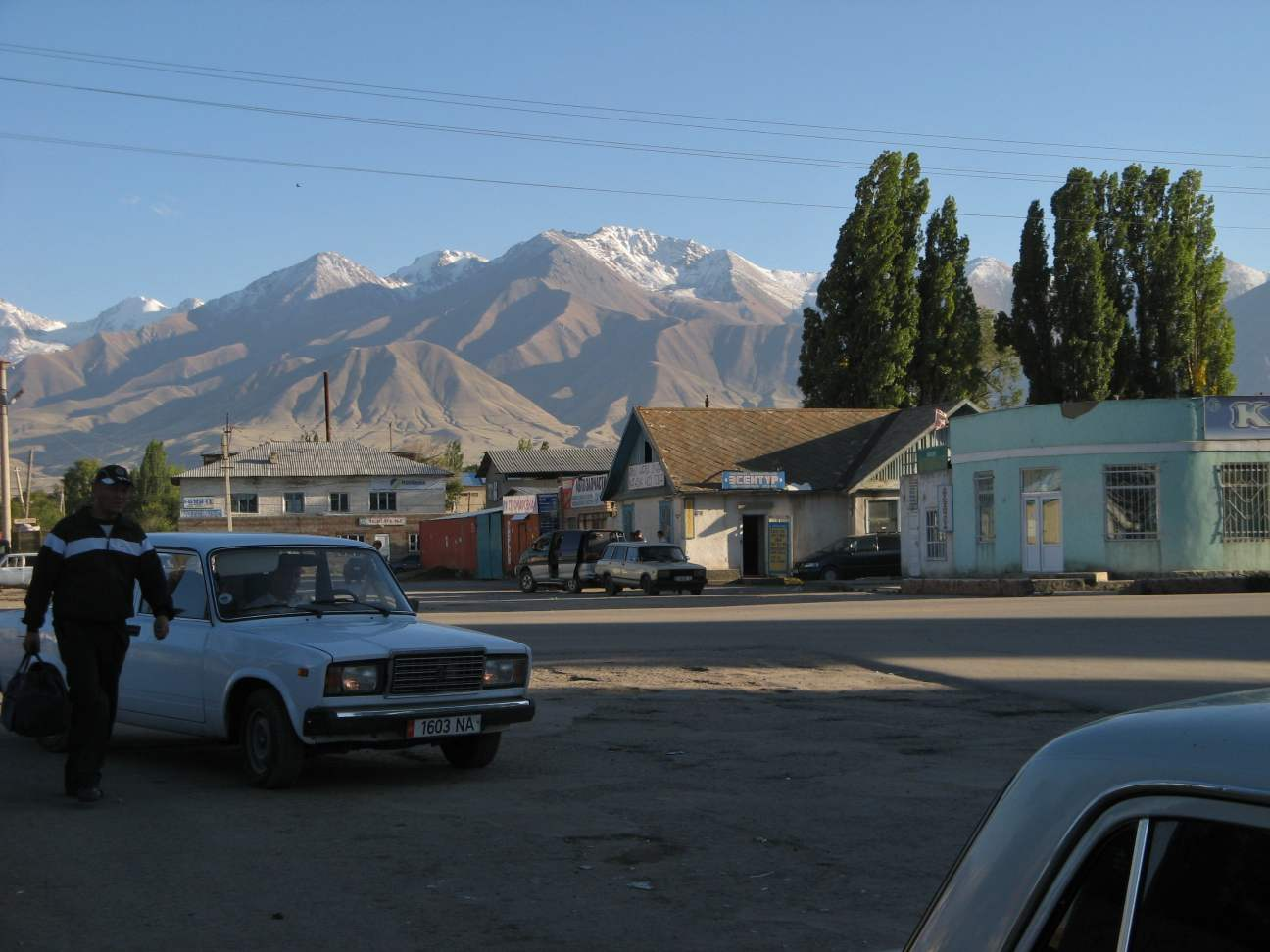

- Location within Kyrgyzstan
- Coordinates: 42°12′57″N 75°45′20″E
- Country: Kyrgyzstan
- Region: Naryn Region
- District: Kochkor District
- Stolypino: 1909
- Elevation: 1,767 m (5,797 ft)

Population (2021)
  - Total: 11,373
- Time zone: UTC+6

Kochkor (Kyrgyz: Кочкор; Russian: Кочкорка, romanized: Kochkorka) is a large village in northern Naryn Region of Kyrgyzstan. It is the administrative centre of Kochkor District. The village was established in 1909 as Stolypino and renamed to Kochkor in 1917. Altitude 1,800 m. Its population was 11,373 in 2021. It is on the main A365 highway from Torugart Pass (China) north to Bishkek. About 7 km west A367 branches west toward Jalal-Abad Region and the Ferghana Valley. About 25 km northeast along the highway is the Orto-Tokoy reservoir and about 45 km northeast is Balykchy on Lake Issyk-Kul. The village is a base for excursions into the high country and tourist infrastructure is fairly well developed. There is a regional museum.

== Population ==
Historical population
Year	Pop.	±% p.a.
2009	9,863	—
2021	11,373	+1.19%
Note: resident population; Sources:

== Notable people ==
- Turdakun Usubalijev, Soviet-era Kyrgyz politician and secretary of the Central Committee of the Communist Party of Kyrgyzstan.
