= Kyzyl-Korgon =

Kyzyl-Korgon Кызыл-Коргон
- Location within Kyrgyzstan
- Coordinates: 41°43′48″N 74°12′0″E
- Country: Kyrgyzstan
- Region: Naryn Region
- District: Jumgal District
- Elevation: 1,284 m (4,213 ft)

Population (2021)
  - Total: 854
- Time zone: UTC+6

Kyzyl-Korgon (Kyrgyz: Кызыл-Коргон) is a village in Naryn Region, Kyrgyzstan. It is part of the Jumgal District. Its population was 854 in 2021.
