= Kabakov =

Kabakov, feminine: Kabakova (Russian or Bulgarian: Кабаков) is a Russian surname originating from the word kabak (tavern). Notable people with the surname include:

- Aleksandr Kabakov (1943–2020), Russian writer and journalist
- Emilia Kabakov (born 1945), Russian-American artist, wife of Ilya
- Georgi Kabakov (born 1986), Bulgarian international football referee
- Ilya Kabakov (1933–2023), Russian-American conceptual artist
- Larisa Kabakova (born 1953), Soviet sprint canoer
- Miryam Kabakov (born 1964), American social worker
- Mitko Kabakov (born 1955), Bulgarian sailor

== See also ==
- Kabak (disambiguation)
- Kabakovsky
