= Kyzart Too =

Coordinates: 42°01′14.6″N 75°23′57.4″E

- Location within Kyrgyzstan

Highest point
- Elevation: 4,400 m (14,400 ft)

Dimensions
- Length: 30 km (19 mi) EW
- Width: 16 km (9.9 mi) SN

Naming
- Native name: Кызарт тоосу

Geography
- Country: Kyrgyzstan
- Region: Naryn Region
- District(s): Kochkor District, Jumgal District

Geology
- Formed by: schists, aleurolites, tuffs
- Rock age: Middle Paleozoic

Kyzart Too (Кызарт тоосу) is a range in the internal Tien-Shan located in Jumgal District and Kochkor District of Naryn Region, Kyrgyzstan. It is spread for 30 km (19 mi) from Kara- Koktu mountains in the east to Kyzart River in the west. The average elevation is 3,800 m (12,500 ft) with the highest point of about 4,400 m (14,400 ft). The eastern part of the range that contains neve areas feeding rivers Chong-Tuz, Kichi-Tuz, Jar-Korumdu, Char-Archa, etc. has higher elevation. The westernmost part of the range manifests itself as smoothed relief of midlands. Characteristic landforms here are isolated dome-shaped elevations with massive crystalline cores. Northern slopes descending to Kyzart river are gentle, and southern slopes, giving rise to Tolok River and Kilemche River, are short. There are ancient peneplain surfaces and U-shaped valleys at the ridge and its branches. The area is rich with sub-Alpian vegetation and is used as a summer pasture. The range is composed of exclusively metamorphic rocks of Middle Paleozoic: schists, aleurolites, tuffs, and other rocks.
