= Bayzak =

Bayzak Байзак
- Location within Kyrgyzstan
- Coordinates: 41°59′40″N 74°35′00″E
- Country: Kyrgyzstan
- Region: Naryn
- District: Jumgal

Population (2021)
  - Total: 6,386
- Time zone: UTC+6

Bayzak (Kyrgyz: Байзак) is a village in Naryn Region of Kyrgyzstan. It is part of the Jumgal District. Its population was 6,386 in 2021.

== Population ==
Historical population
Year	Pop.	±% p.a.
2009	5,216	—
2021	6,386	+1.70%
Note: resident population; Sources:
