= Suusamyr =

Suusamyr Суусамыр
- Location within Kyrgyzstan
- Coordinates: 42°10′40″N 73°57′50″E
- Country: Kyrgyzstan
- Region: Chüy Region
- District: Jayyl District

Population (2021)
  - Total: 3,468
- Website: Official website

Suusamyr (Kyrgyz: Суусамыр) is a village in the southern part of the Jayyl District of Chüy Region of Kyrgyzstan. Its population was 3,468 in 2021. It is situated in the Suusamyr Valley, on the northern bank of the river Suusamyr.

== Climate ==
Climate data for Suusamyr (1991–2020)
Month	Jan	Feb	Mar	Apr	May	Jun	Jul	Aug	Sep	Oct	Nov	Dec	Year
Daily mean °C (°F)	−21.4 (−6.5)	−17.7 (0.1)	−8.8 (16.2)	2.0 (35.6)	9.0 (48.2)	11.9 (53.4)	13.8 (56.8)	13.2 (55.8)	9.3 (48.7)	2.2 (36.0)	−6.3 (20.7)	−16.9 (1.6)	−0.8 (30.6)
Source: NOAA
