= Sarykamysh Range =

Mountain range in Kyrgyzstan

- Location within Kyrgyzstan

Highest point
- Peak: Unnamed peak
- Elevation: 4,042 m (13,261 ft)
- Coordinates: 41°50′30.90″N 74°06′46.84″E

Dimensions
- Length: 39 km (24 mi)
- Width: 17 km (11 mi)

Naming
- Native name: Сарыкамыш кырка тоосу (Kyrgyz)

Geography
- Country: Kyrgyzstan
- Region: Inner Tien Shan
- District: Jumgal District
- Parent range: Suusamyr Too

Geology
- Rock type(s): Porphyritic granite, adamellite, granodiorite

The Sarykamysh Range (Kyrgyz: Сарыкамыш кырка тоосу) is a mountain range in the Inner Tien Shan of Kyrgyzstan. It forms a southeastern spur of the Suusamyr Too and is situated between the Kökömeren and Köbük rivers in Jumgal District, Naryn Region. The range extends 39 km from east to west and is 17 km wide. Its average elevation is 3,800 m, reaching a maximum height of 4,042 m.

== Geography ==
The central part of the range is elevated and glaciated. The southern slopes are long and relatively steep, while the northern slopes are shorter and more gradual.

The western section is rocky, with slopes dissected by numerous gullies and ravines. The central section is characterized by sharp peaks, exposed rock surfaces, and deep gorges. The eastern section is generally more level, with remnants of ancient erosion surfaces and slopes descending gradually towards the Kökömeren River.

Several left tributaries of the Kökömeren originate in the range, including the Köbüksuu, Kashkasuu, Tuurasuu, Tuurakayyng, Karaküngöy, and Tuuraterek rivers.

== Geology ==
The range consists mainly of intrusive igneous rocks, including porphyritic granite, adamellite, and granodiorite.

== Vegetation ==
Vegetation varies with elevation. Dry steppe and shrub-steppe landscapes occur up to approximately 2,400 m. Between 2,400 and 3,000 m, shrublands, meadow-steppe, and meadows predominate, with sparse juniper woodlands in some areas.

Subalpine and alpine meadow-steppe and meadow vegetation extend up to approximately 3,700 m. Above this elevation, nival and glacial landscapes prevail.

== Land use ==
The range is used extensively for grazing and contains numerous hayfields. The villages of Sarykamysh and Chaŋ-Döbö, as well as seasonal winter livestock settlements, are located at its foothills.

== See also ==
- Tien Shan
- Naryn Region
- Suusamyr Too
- Kökömeren
