= Nurlan Motuev =

Kyrgyz politician (1969–2026)

Nurlan Motuev (Kyrgyz: Нурлан Мотуев; 10 December 1969 – 26 June 2026) was a Kyrgyz politician from the Jumgal area of Naryn province, popularly nicknamed the King of Coal after seizing control of the Karakeche coal mines during 2005. One of the activists behind the 2006 revolution, he later went on trial and was jailed but rebounded to become a presidential candidate for the 2009 elections, receiving 21,724 (0.93%) votes. In October 2012 his newly formed Patriotic Movement called for the nationalization of Kyrgyzstan's mineral resources.

Motuev died on 26 June 2026, at the age of 56.
