= Suusamyr (river) =

River in Kyrgyzstan

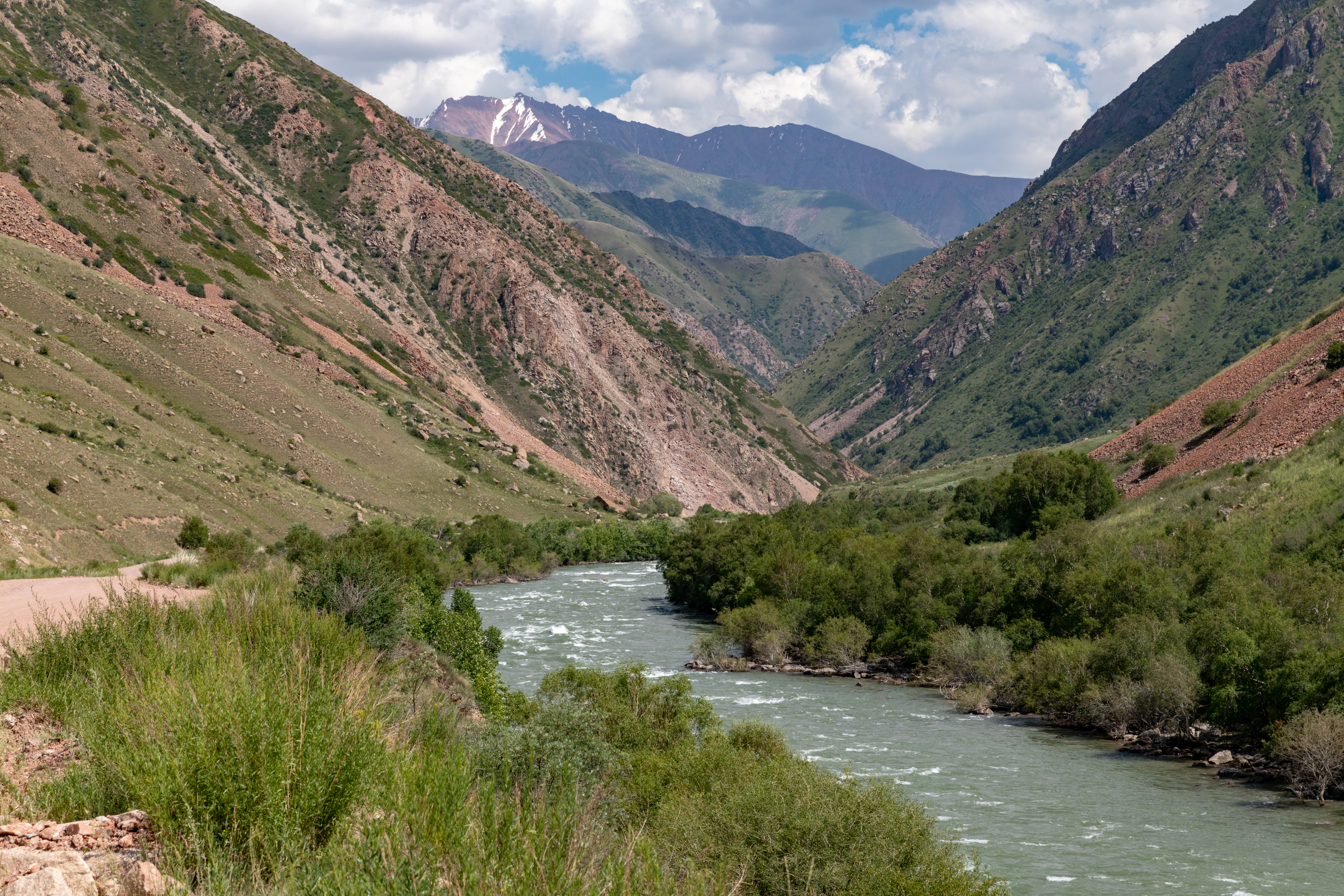
- Native name: Суусамыр (Kyrgyz)

Location
- Country: Kyrgyzstan
- Region: Chüy Region
- District: Jayyl District

Physical characteristics
- Mouth: Kökömeren
  - coordinates: 42°07′21″N 74°03′43″E
  - elevation: 2,030 m (6,660 ft)
- Length: 90 km (56 mi)
- Basin size: 2,410 km^{2} (930 sq mi)
- Discharge
  - average: 39.3 m³/s

Basin features
- Progression: Kökömeren→ Naryn→ Syr Darya→ North Aral Sea
- Tributaries
  - left: Ötmök, Korumdu, Charyia
  - right: Western and Eastern Aramza, Chong Üchemchek

The Suusamyr (Kyrgyz: Суусамыр) is a river in Jayyl District of Chüy Region of Kyrgyzstan. Starting at Ala-Bel Pass, where the Talas Ala-Too and Suusamyr Too meet, it flows eastwards along Suusamyr Valley. The Suusamyr is 90 kilometres (56 mi) long, and has a drainage basin of 2,410 square kilometres (930 sq mi). The average annual flow is 39.3 m³/s. The riverbanks are wide and marshy, and in some areas, it splits into multiple branches, with a floodplain several kilometers wide. The lower reaches have shrub and forest vegetation along the banks. The river is fed by snow, glaciers, and springs. It swells in April and recedes by September. The Suusamyr's confluence with the Batysh Karakol (Western Karakol) forms the Kökömeren. The village of Suusamyr is located along its banks.

== Tributaries ==
Main tributaries are:

- Left: Ötmök, Korumdu, Charyia
- Right: Western and Eastern Aramza, Chong Üchemchek.

Some of its tributaries are used for irrigation.
