= Eshekart Range =

Mountain range in Kyrgyzstan

- Location of the highest point of the Eshekart Range

Highest point
- Elevation: 4,384 m (14,383 ft)
- Coordinates: 41°52′32.97″N 78°42′57.11″E

Dimensions
- Length: 50 km (31 mi) east–west
- Width: 12 km (7.5 mi)

Naming
- Native name: Kyrgyz: Эшекарт тоосу

Geography
- Country: Kyrgyzstan
- Region: Issyk-Kul Region
- District: Jeti-Ögüz District
- Parent range: Tian Shan

The Eshekart Range (Kyrgyz: Эшекарт тоосу) is a mountain range in the central Tian Shan, in Jeti-Ögüz District of Kyrgyzstan. It lies east of the Ak-Shyyrak mountain massif, between the Uchköl and Ak-Shyyrak rivers, both right tributaries of the Saryjaz. The range extends approximately 50 kilometres (31 mi) from east to west, has an average elevation of 4,200 metres (13,800 ft), and reaches a maximum elevation of 4,384 metres (14,383 ft). Its maximum width is 12 kilometres (7.5 mi).

== Relief ==
The range rises towards its central part. Its western crest has sharp peaks, while the central and eastern sections are more subdued and retain remnants of ancient erosion surfaces. The slopes are dissected by small ravines and gullies. The southwestern slope is broader and relatively gentle.

== Geology ==
The range consists mainly of Devonian and Carboniferous siltstone, shale, conglomerate, sandstone, marl, and marbleized and dolomitic limestone. The rocks are cut by parallel tectonic faults trending east–west.

== Landscapes and land use ==
Desert and steppe landscapes occur on the northern slope up to approximately 3,400 metres (11,200 ft), followed by subalpine and alpine meadow steppe at elevations of 3,400 to 3,800 metres (11,200 to 12,500 ft). On the southern slope, desert and semi-desert extend up to approximately 2,900 metres (9,500 ft), with subalpine and alpine steppe and nival–glacial landscapes at higher elevations. The area is used as pastureland.
