= Jetim Range =

Mountain range in Kyrgyzstan

- Location within Kyrgyzstan

Highest point
- Peak: Unnamed peak
- Elevation: 4,931 m (16,178 ft)
- Coordinates: 41.5833°N 77.0°E

Dimensions
- Length: 120 km (75 mi)
- Width: 24 km (15 mi)

Naming
- Native name: Жетим кырка тоосу (Kyrgyz)

Geography
- Country: Kyrgyzstan
- Region: Inner Tien Shan

Geology
- Orogeny: Alpine orogeny
- Rock age(s): Proterozoic, Paleozoic
- Rock type(s): Sandstone, slate, limestone, gneiss, quartzite, porphyrite

The Jetim Range or Zhetim Range (Kyrgyz: Жетим кырка тоосу) is a mountain range in the Inner Tien Shan of Kyrgyzstan, situated between the Chong-Naryn and Kichi-Naryn rivers. It extends 120 km in length and 24 km in width, with an average elevation of 4,280 m, reaching a maximum height of 4,931 m.

The range is asymmetrical. Its southern slopes, facing the Naryn Valley, have a greater relative height than the northern ones. Ancient planation surfaces are widespread on the slopes at elevations of 3,500–3,800 m. They are well expressed along almost the entire northern slope and in the eastern part of the southern slope of the range, in the section facing the Upper Naryn Basin.

The western part of the southern slope is deeply dissected by very scenic gorges covered with spruce forests. The depth of dissection locally reaches 2,000 m. Under these conditions, denudation surfaces are preserved only in small, isolated areas.

== Geology ==
The western part of the range consists of Ordovician-Devonian sandstones, slates, and conglomerates. The central part is composed of Proterozoic crystalline limestone, gneiss, and quartzite, while the eastern part contains marbleized and dolomitic limestone with graphite-bearing phyllites. The northern slopes contain Paleogene-Neogene deposits, and Quaternary loose sediments are found in the valleys.

== Glaciers ==
The eastern part of the range is covered with glaciers, which occupy 120 km^{2} (about 11% of the total mountain area). Most glaciers are located on the northern slopes, extending up to 5–6 km in length.

== Vegetation ==
The lower elevations of the range feature pine forests and alpine meadows, especially in deep valleys such as Zhakbolot, Atzhailoo, Taldysuu, Moldobashy, and Kurmenty. The southern slopes are steeper and rocky, while the northern slopes have lush meadows and subalpine grasslands.

== Resources ==
The Jetim Range is rich in mineral deposits, including iron (Jetimtoo deposit), manganese (Archaly and Zhakbolot deposits), vanadium, molybdenum, tungsten, and various construction materials.

== Usage ==
The region is primarily used as pastureland.

== See also ==
- Tien Shan
- Naryn Region
- Naryn (river)
