= Kemin Range =

Mountain range in Kyrgyzstan

- Location within Kyrgyzstan

Highest point
- Elevation: 3,884 m (12,743 ft)
- Coordinates: 42°52′00″N 76°13′46″E

Dimensions
- Length: 36 km (22 mi)
- Width: 10 km (6.2 mi)

Naming
- Native name: Кемин тоосу (Kyrgyz)

Geography
- Country: Kyrgyzstan

Geology
- Formed by: granite slabs, granite-gneiss, granite-pegmatites
- Rock age: Proterozoic

The Kemin Range (or Kemin-Too, Kyrgyz: Кемин тоосу) is a mountain range in the north Tien-Shan, a southern branch of the Trans-Ili Alatau. It stretches for 36 km from southeast to northwest between the valleys of the rivers Kichi-Kemin (river) and Tegirmenti, left tributary of the Chong-Kemin. The range's average altitude is 3,100 m (10,200 ft), and the highest point 3,884 m (12,743 ft). The mountains are largely composed of granite slabs, granite-gneiss, granite-pegmatites and other rocks formed in the beginning of Proterozoic. The eastern part of the range features the Alpine relief: the crests are high and rocky with traces of ancient glaciation. The western part is mountainous. Northern and southern slopes are limited by tectonic faults. Flat crests and denudation plains are among distinguishing features. Steppe and meadow-steppe (1,600 m (5,200 ft) - 1,800 m (5,900 ft)), shrub meadows (2,500 m (8,200 ft) - 2,600 m (8,500 ft)), sub-Alpine and Alpine meadow (3,100 m (10,200 ft) - 3,200 m (10,500 ft) msl), and nival-glacial belt (above 3,200 m (10,500 ft)) are characteristic landscapes.
