= Koksu Range (Tien-Shan) =

Mountain range on the Kyrgyzstan–Uzbekistan border

- Location in Kyrgyzstan Location in Uzbekistan

Dimensions
- Length: 60 km (37 mi)
- Width: 15–17 km (9.3–10.6 mi)

Naming
- Native name: Көксуу тоосу (Kyrgyz); Koʻksuv tizmasi (Uzbek)

Geography
- Countries: Kyrgyzstan; Uzbekistan
- Range coordinates: 41°49′12.94″N 70°35′56.08″E
- Parent range: Pskem Mountains, Tian Shan

The Koksu Range (Kyrgyz: Көксуу тоосу; Uzbek: Koʻksuv tizmasi) is a southeastern branch of the Pskem Mountains in the western Tian Shan. It forms the watershed between the Chatkal and Koksu rivers, along the border between Kyrgyzstan and Uzbekistan. The range is approximately 60 kilometres (37 mi) long and 15–17 kilometres (9.3–10.6 mi) wide. Its steep, rocky slopes support woodland, steppe and mountain meadows, with the grasslands used for grazing.

== Geography ==
The Koksu Range lies southeast of the Pskem Mountains and northwest of the Chatkal Range. It extends from the Chatkal River valley towards its junction with the Pskem Mountains at Qoratepa, at 3,685 metres (12,090 ft). The Kyrgyzstan–Uzbekistan border follows its watershed crest, which separates the Koksu and Chatkal river basins.

The range is approximately 60 kilometres (37 mi) long and 15–17 kilometres (9.3–10.6 mi) wide, with an average elevation of 3,100–3,300 metres (10,200–10,800 ft). Its constituent ridges include Chatirtepa and Kengyaylov. Elevations increase towards the northeast, from approximately 2,498 metres (8,196 ft) in the southwest to 3,366 metres (11,043 ft) at Qozonbuloq in the central section and 3,673 metres (12,051 ft) at Chatirtepa in the northeast. (Note: Summit names and elevations differ between the two encyclopedias. The National Encyclopedia of Uzbekistan gives Chatirtepa as 3,673 metres (12,051 ft) and Qoratepa, at the junction with the Pskem Mountains, as 3,685 metres (12,090 ft). The geographical encyclopedia of Kyrgyzstan identifies Chatyr-Döbö, at 3,828 metres (12,559 ft), as the highest point of the range.)

The crest is rocky and precipitous, with sharp peaks. Slopes commonly reach angles of 40–50° and are dissected by short, deep ravines and gorges. The relief is predominantly middle-mountain as far as Qozonbuloq, becoming more distinctly high-mountain towards the northeast. The Koksu River flows through a deep gorge alongside the range. (Note: The geographical encyclopedia of Kyrgyzstan describes the range as having no glaciers. The National Encyclopedia of Uzbekistan reports permanent snowfields and small glaciers along the watershed.)

== Geology ==
The range forms a large anticlinal structure composed of Devonian and Carboniferous limestone and shale, intruded by granite, granodiorite, gabbro, syenite and other igneous rocks. Its geological structure is complex, with folded formations cut by deep tectonic faults.

The southeastern section consists of granite, granodiorite and granosyenite. The central section contains Lower Carboniferous conglomerate, arkosic sandstone, bituminous limestone and dolomitic limestone. The northwestern section comprises Devonian dolomite, sandstone, shale and gritstone.

== Vegetation and land use ==
Brown soils, with mountain forest soils in some areas, occur at elevations of approximately 1,200–2,800 metres (3,900–9,200 ft). Woodland includes juniper at higher elevations, with walnut, cherry plum, almond and hawthorn lower down.

On the southeastern slope, steppe, meadows and shrubby woodland extend to approximately 2,800–2,900 metres (9,200–9,500 ft). Higher elevations support subalpine and alpine meadows, meadow steppe and subnival cold-desert landscapes. High-elevation vegetation includes kobresia, fescues and other low-growing plants on mountain meadow-steppe soils.

The mountain grasslands are used as pasture.
