= Alamyshyk Too =

- Location within Kyrgyzstan

Highest point
- Elevation: 3,399 m (11,152 ft)
- Coordinates: 41°24′14″N 75°53′20″E

Dimensions
- Length: 36 km (22 mi)
- Width: 6–20 km (3.7–12.4 mi)

Naming
- Native name: Аламышык Тоо (Kyrgyz)

Geography
- Country: Kyrgyzstan
- Region: Naryn
- District: At-Bashi

Geology
- Formed by: limestone
- Rock age(s): Devonian, Carboniferous

The Alamyshyk Too (or Alamyshyk Range, Kyrgyz: Аламышык Тоосу) is a mountain range in the internal Tien-Shan to the west of Naryn Too between Naryn Valley and At-Bashy Valley. The range is located in At-Bashi District of Naryn Region. The length of the range is 35 km (22 mi) and the width ranges from 6 km (3.7 mi) to 20 km (12 mi). The heights varies largely from 3,000 m (9,800 ft) to 3,300 m (10,800 ft) with the highest point of 3,399 m (11,152 ft). The mountains are composed of limestone of Devonian and Carboniferous. There are some caves in the mountains. The northern slopes are covered by spruce and bushes, southern - by semi-desert dry steppe plants, and eastern slopes and higher altitudes covered by sub-Alpian feather grass.
