= Suusamyr Too =

- Kyrgyz: Суусамыр тоо кыркасы
- Location within Kyrgyzstan

Highest point
- Elevation: 4,048 m (13,281 ft)

Dimensions
- Length: 126 km (78 mi) E–W
- Width: 31 km (19 mi) N–S

Naming
- Etymology: Possibly from Sygun Samur, recorded by Mahmud al-Kashgari; interpreted as Kyrgyz suu samyry ("water beaver").

Geography
- Country: Kyrgyzstan
- Region(s): Naryn Region, Jalal-Abad Region
- District(s): Jumgal District, Toktogul District
- Range coordinates: 42°08′N 73°15′E

Geology
- Rock type(s): Gabbro, diorite, granite, gneiss, schist, sandstone, limestone, tuff

Suusamyr Too (Kyrgyz: Суусамыр тоо кыркасы) is a mountain range in the Inner Tian Shan of Kyrgyzstan. It forms the southwestern margin of the Suusamyr Valley and the northeastern margin of the Ketmen-Töbö Valley. The range extends for approximately 126 kilometres (78 mi) from the Kökömeren River valley and the Kara-Küngöy and Sary-Kamysh mountains in the east to the Talas Ala-Too–Chatkal Range mountain junction in the west, reaching a maximum width of 31 kilometres (19 mi). Its average elevation is about 3,500 metres (11,500 ft), while its highest summit reaches 4,048 metres (13,281 ft).

== Etymology ==
Possibly derived from Sygun Samur, a place name recorded by Mahmud al-Kashgari in the 11th-century Dīwān Lughāt al-Turk. According to one interpretation, samur is an Iranian word meaning "beaver" or "otter", and the name Suusamyr may therefore mean "water beaver" (Kyrgyz: suu samyry ). In modern geographical usage, the name Suusamyr refers not only to the valley but also to several related geographic features in Kyrgyzstan, including the Suusamyr Too, Suusamyr Pass, and Suusamyr River.

== Geography and Relief ==
The range consists predominantly of weakly dissected granitic ridges with pyramidal peaks. Perennial snowfields occupy basin-like depressions at the headwaters of rivers, and small retreating glaciers occur in some cirques. U-shaped valleys and morainic deposits provide evidence of former glaciation.

The northeastern slopes are comparatively gentle and locally exhibit stepped relief, whereas the southwestern slopes descending toward the Ketmen-Töbö Valley are more rugged and deeply dissected by valleys and gorges formed by the right-bank tributaries of the Naryn River.

According to Kyrgyz geographical sources, the northern slope is relatively short and characterized by rolling uplands, while the southern slope is broader with low foothills. Near the Kökömeren River, the range becomes steep and rocky, and its slopes are cut by numerous river valleys, including the gorges of the Chychkan and Toluk rivers.

The Sarykamysh Range forms a southeastern spur of the Suusamyr Too, extending between the Kökömeren and Köbük rivers.

== Geology ==
The range is composed predominantly of intrusive rocks formed during various stages of the Caledonian orogeny, including gabbro, diorite, and granite. In some areas, Precambrian, Cambrian, and Ordovician gneiss, crystalline schist, sandstone, limestone, and tuff occur. Intermontane depressions and river valleys contain Quaternary sediments. The range is crossed by major tectonic faults.

== Glaciation ==
The total glacier area is about 25 square kilometres (9.7 sq mi). Evidence of ancient glaciation is also present.

== Landscapes ==
Vegetation changes with elevation. The northern slopes are characterized by dry feather-grass and wormwood steppe up to about 2,200 m, meadow-steppe up to 2,600 m, subalpine meadows up to 3,200 m, and alpine meadows above that elevation. The southern slopes feature semi-desert landscapes below 1,200 m, steppe and meadow-steppe between 1,200 and 2,200 m, tall-grass meadows up to 3,000 m, subalpine and alpine meadows above 3,000 m, and a glacial–nival zone above 3,700–3,800 m.

The range is widely used as summer pasture.
