= Kalba-Too =

- Location within Kyrgyzstan

Highest point
- Peak: Atchykpas
- Elevation: 4,146 m (13,602 ft)
- Coordinates: 42°16′01″N 72°27′50″E

Dimensions
- Length: 29 km (18 mi)
- Width: 14 km (8.7 mi)

Naming
- Native name: Калба-Тоо (Kyrgyz)

Geography
- Country: Kyrgyzstan

The Kalba-Too (or Kalbatoo, Kyrgyz: Калба-Тоо) is a mountain range in the north Tien-Shan, a northern branch of the Talas Ala-Too Range. It stretches for 29 km from south to north between the valleys of the rivers Beshtash and Kalba, left tributaries of the Talas. Its highest point is Atchykpas, elevation 4,146 m. The mountains are dissected by a dense net of short and shallow, but steep gulleys. The slopes have a weathering crust, the surface of which is sodded.
