= Naryn Too =

Mountain range in Naryn, Kyrgyzstan

Highest point
- Elevation: 4,499 m (14,760 ft)
- Coordinates: 41°21′25.80″N 76°23′4.86″E

Naming
- Native name: Нарын Тоо (Kyrgyz)

Geography
- Country: Kyrgyzstan
- Region: Naryn
- District: At-Bashy

Geology
- Formed by: shists, quartzites, limestones, and granodiorites
- Rock age: Paleozoic

The Naryn Too (or Naryn Range, Kyrgyz: Нарын Тоосу) is a mountain range located in the inner Tien-Shan, situated between Naryn Valley and At-Bashy Valley to the east of Alamyshyk Too. The range spans approximately 120 km (75 mi) in length and up to 18 km (11 mi) in width. Its average elevation is around 4,200 m (13,800 ft), with the highest peak, Orto-Acha Mountain, reaching 4,499 m (14,760 ft).

The Naryn Too features sharply rugged glacier relief, particularly pronounced in the eastern part of the range, where denudation surfaces are found at elevations of 3,600 m (11,800 ft) to 3,800 m (12,500 ft) on the northern slopes. In the central section, both slopes are highly dissected, while the western part displays denudation surfaces on both sides. The foothills are primarily located along the southern slopes.

== Geology ==
Geologically, the Naryn Mountain Range is part of the Central Tien Shan and is bordered to the southeast by the At-Bashy – Engilchek tectonic fault. The central section forms the western wing of the Chon Naryn anticlinorium. The central and eastern parts of the range are composed of various terrigenous rock, shists, quartzites, limestones, granodiorites, and the western part - by rocks of the middle and late Paleozoic.

== Landscapes ==
The landscapes change with elevation.The northern slopes are covered by spruce forests at elevations of 2,600 m (8,500 ft) - 3,000 m (9,800 ft), by sub-Alpian meadows and meadow steppes at 3,000 m (9,800 ft) - 3,200 m (10,500 ft), and by Alpine meadows at 3,200 m (10,500 ft) - 3,500 m (11,500 ft). High altitude feather-grass steppes (2,600 m (8,500 ft) - 3,000 m (9,800 ft)), spruce forests (2,800 m (9,200 ft) - 3,000 m (9,800 ft)), sub-Alpian meadows and meadow steppes, Central Asia juniper (3,000 m (9,800 ft) - 3,200 m (10,500 ft)), and glacial-nival belt (above 3,600 m (11,800 ft)) are observed at the southern slopes.

== Glaciers ==
The total area of glaciers in the range is 69.1 km².
