= Qəvoy =

- Municipality
- Location within Azerbaijan
- Coordinates: 38°36′07″N 48°34′45″E
- Country: Azerbaijan
- Rayon: Lerik

Population
  - Total: 272
- Time zone: UTC+4 (AZT)
  - Summer (DST): UTC+5 (AZT)

Qəvoy (also, Qəğoy and Kagoy) is a village and municipality in the Lerik Rayon of Azerbaijan. It has a population of 272.
