= Keng-Suu, Jumgal =

Keng-Suu Kyrgyz: Кең-Суу
- Location within Kyrgyzstan
- Coordinates: 41°45′0″N 74°4′48″E
- Country: Kyrgyzstan
- Region: Naryn Region
- District: Jumgal District
- Elevation: 1,680 m (5,510 ft)

Population (2021)
  - Total: 111
- Time zone: UTC+6

Keng-Suu (Kyrgyz: Кең-Суу, lit. 'a wide water') is a village in Naryn Region, Kyrgyzstan. It is part of the Jumgal District. Its population was 111 in 2021.
