= Ters (mountain) =

Mountain range in western Kyrgyzstan

Highest point
- Elevation: 3,890 m (12,760 ft)

Dimensions
- Length: 30 km (19 mi) southwest–northeast
- Width: 16 km (9.9 mi)

Naming
- Native name: Терс тоосу (Kyrgyz)

Geography
- Country: Kyrgyzstan
- Parent range: Tian Shan

Ters (Kyrgyz: Терс тоосу) is a mountain range in the western Tian Shan of Kyrgyzstan, between the Ters and Chatkal rivers. It extends approximately 30 kilometres (19 mi) from southwest to northeast and is 16 kilometres (9.9 mi) wide. Its average elevation is 3,300 metres (10,800 ft), and its highest point reaches 3,890 metres (12,760 ft).

== Geography ==
The range lies between the Ters and Chatkal rivers and extends from southwest to northeast for approximately 30 kilometres (19 mi), with a width of 16 kilometres (9.9 mi). Its average elevation is 3,300 metres (10,800 ft), rising to a maximum of 3,890 metres (12,760 ft).

The crest is rocky. The northern slope, facing the Chatkal Valley, is relatively gentle, whereas the slope towards the Ters River is steep and rocky, with a gorge-like valley.

Part of the Besh-Aral Nature Reserve lies within the Ters Range.

== Geology ==
The range consists predominantly of Carboniferous intrusive rocks, including fine- and medium-grained granite, granodiorite and granosyenite.

== Vegetation and land use ==
Vegetation varies with elevation. Steppe and meadow steppe occur up to approximately 2,300 metres (7,500 ft). Meadows, woodland and shrub vegetation occupy elevations of 2,300–2,800 metres (7,500–9,200 ft), followed by tall-herb meadows at 2,800–3,000 metres (9,200–9,800 ft). Higher elevations support subalpine and alpine meadows, giving way to glacial–nival landscapes. The range is used as pasture.
