= Akademik Adyshev Range =

Mountain range in Kyrgyzstan

- Location in Kyrgyzstan

Highest point
- Peak: Akademik Adyshev Peak
- Elevation: 4,785 m (15,699 ft)
- Coordinates: 40°02′22.02″N 73°55′48.35″E

Dimensions
- Length: 110 km (68 mi) NW–SE
- Width: 50 km (31 mi)

Naming
- Native name: Kyrgyz: Академик Адышев кырка тоосу

Geography
- Country: Kyrgyzstan
- Region: Osh Region

The Akademik Adyshev Range (Kyrgyz: Академик Адышев кырка тоосу) is a mountain range in northeastern Osh Region, Kyrgyzstan, between the Tar and Gülchö rivers. It extends for approximately 110 kilometres (68 mi), reaching 4,785 metres (15,699 ft) at Akademik Adyshev Peak. The range is named after the Kyrgyz geologist and academician Musa Adyshev.

== Geography ==
The range comprises a group of roughly north–south-trending ridges between the Alaykuu and Gülchö valleys. It adjoins the Kök-Suu Range to the north and is bounded by the Adyke–Gülchö Fault to the west. Narrow valleys, including those of Andakul, Terek, Chiyrchyldak and Ak-Bogus, separate its constituent ridges.

Töö-Jayloo Pass separates the range from the Terek Mountains. From the pass, it extends northwestwards, gradually decreasing in elevation. The range is up to 50 kilometres (31 mi) wide, with an average elevation of 3,260 metres (10,700 ft). Its highest peak lies in the southeastern section. Major subsidiary ridges include Kyzylargyn, Jylangach-Tash, Kök-Bulak, Kara-Sorong and Aldayar.

The southeastern section has steep, deeply dissected alpine terrain with pointed, snow- and ice-covered peaks. Evidence of past glaciation is widespread there. Landforms shaped by denudation and erosion predominate in the central and northwestern sections, while gently sloping depositional landforms characterise the foothills.

== Geology ==
The geological structure of the range developed during the Hercynian orogeny and is cut by numerous approximately north–south-trending tectonic faults. The higher southeastern section consists of Silurian and Devonian slate, sandstone and conglomerate. The central section comprises phyllite, sericite schist and sandstone attributed to the Jurassic, Cretaceous and Paleogene, while the lower northwestern section consists of Paleogene and Quaternary sand, clay and conglomerate. The 1987 encyclopedia also records Paleozoic siltstone and limestone in the southeastern section.

== Glaciers and vegetation ==
Hanging glaciers occur on the higher peaks. The landscape belts range from low-mountain steppe through montane meadow-steppe, meadows and shrub woodland to subalpine and alpine vegetation and glacial–nival terrain at the highest elevations. The range is used for grazing.
