= Kök-Oy =

Kök-Oy Көк-Ой
- Location within Kyrgyzstan
- Coordinates: 41°51′36″N 74°24′36″E
- Country: Kyrgyzstan
- Region: Naryn Region
- District: Jumgal District
- Elevation: 1,712 m (5,617 ft)

Population (2021)
  - Total: 2,830
- Time zone: UTC+6

Kök-Oy (Kyrgyz: Көк-Ой [kœɣój]) is a village in Jumgal District of Naryn Region of Kyrgyzstan. Its population was 2,830 in 2021.
