= Doğan Kabak =

Turkish Journalist and Youtuber (born 1980)

Personal information
- Nationality: (Turkey) Turkish
- Born: April 23, 1980 (age 46); Istanbul, Turkey

World Rally Championship record
- Championships: 0
- Rally wins: 0
- Podiums: 0
- Stage wins: 0
- Total points: 0

Doğan Kabak (born 23 April 1980) is a Turkish rally driver.

Kabak was born in 1980. In Turkey, at the moment, he is the publisher of Top Gear Turkey and Health & Fitness magazines. Before that, he was editor chief at AutoCar and EVO magazine. At the same time, he attended a lot of Rally and Track races, and he acquired degrees.

Kabak won the first place at class 7 in the 2014 Turkey Autocross championship with Mitsubishi Lancer Evolution.

Kabak represented Turkey at the Mazda mx-5 open race, which took place in Italy in 2009.
