= Jumgal =

- Location within Kyrgyzstan
- Native name: Жумгал (Kyrgyz)

Location
- Country: Kyrgyzstan

Physical characteristics
- Mouth: Kökömeren
  - coordinates: 41°51′07″N 74°20′33″E
- Length: 96 km (60 mi)
- Basin size: 3,080 km^{2} (1,190 sq mi)

Basin features
- Progression: Kökömeren→ Naryn→ Syr Darya→ North Aral Sea

The Jumgal (Kyrgyz: Жумгал) is a river in Jumgal District, Naryn Region, Kyrgyzstan. It is a left tributary of the Kökömeren. The river is formed at the confluence of the rivers Kyzart and Bazarturuk, which originate in the Fergana Range. The river's length is 96 km, and its basin area is 3,080 km^{2}. It flows through the up to 30 km wide Jumgal Valley, which lies between the mountain ranges Jumgal Too to the north and Moldo Too to the south. The Jumgal is used for irrigation. It flows along the villages Tügöl-Say, Chaek and Aral.
