= Donguz-Too (range) =

Mountain range in Kyrgyzstan

- Location within Kyrgyzstan

Highest point
- Elevation: 2,354 m (7,723 ft)
- Coordinates: 40°54′23″N 73°39′20″E

Dimensions
- Length: 28 km (17 mi) SE-NW
- Width: 6 km (3.7 mi) NE-SW

Naming
- Native name: Доңузтоо (Kyrgyz)

Geography
- Country: Kyrgyzstan
- Region: Osh Region

Geology
- Rock type(s): Composed of limestone and shist of middle Paleozoic in southeast part, and sandstone, clay, and marl of Paleogene and Cretaceous in northwest part.

The Donguz-Too (Kyrgyz: Доңузтоо; Russian: Донуз-Тоо ) is an offshoot of Fergana Range located in the West Tien Shan, Kyrgyzstan. It is located between valleys of rivers Donguz-Too and Zyndan-Suu, both right tributaries of the river Jazy (Yassy). The length of the range is approximately 28 km and the width - 6 km. The average altitude is about 2,100 - 2,200 m and the highest peak - 2,354 m. The range is mainly composed of limestone and shist of middle Paleozoic in southeast part, and sandstone, clay, and marl of Paleogene and Cretaceous in northwest part. The slopes are gentle and the terrain is mildly or moderately rugged.
