= Balykchy =

Balykchy Балыкчы
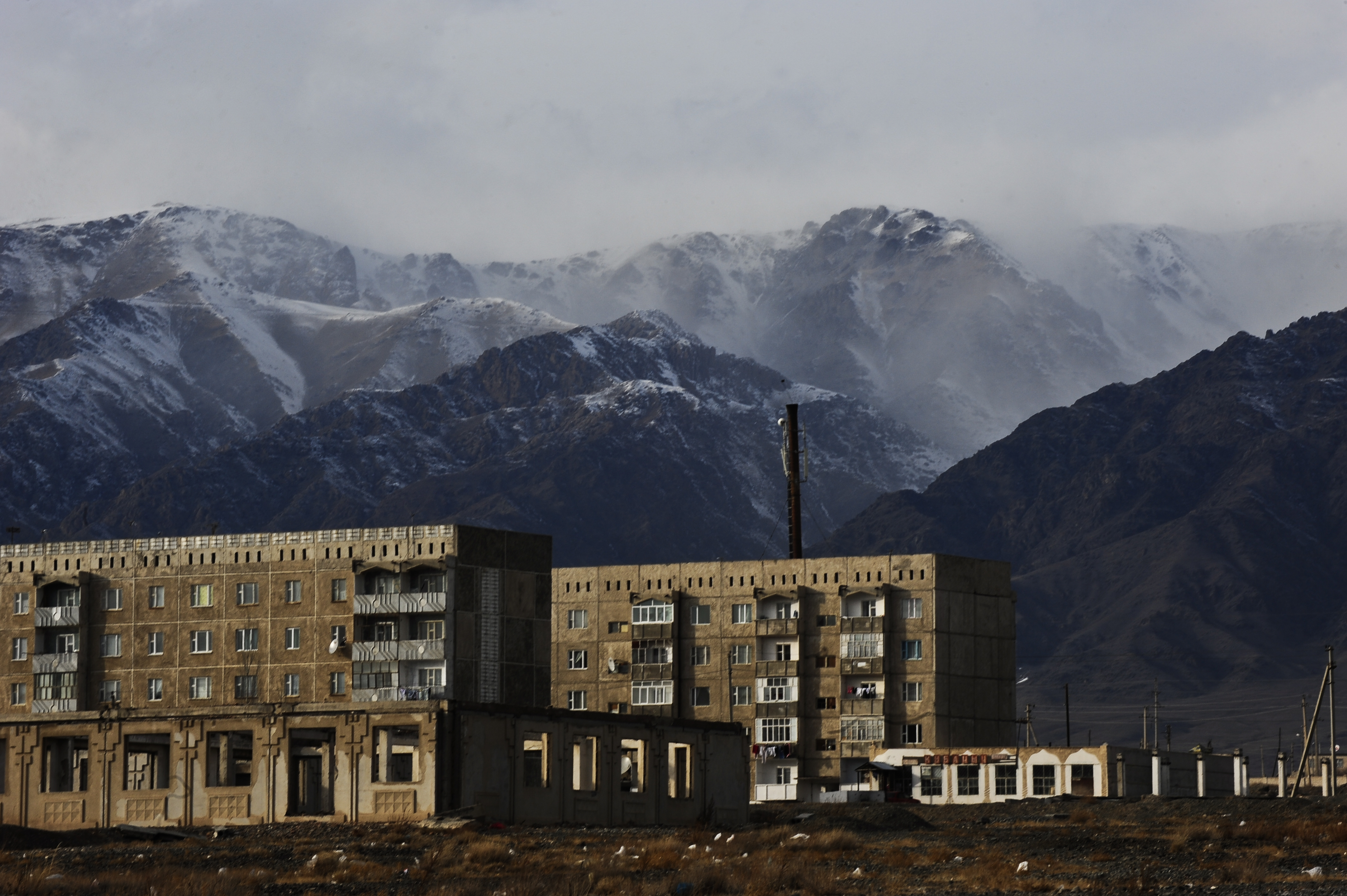
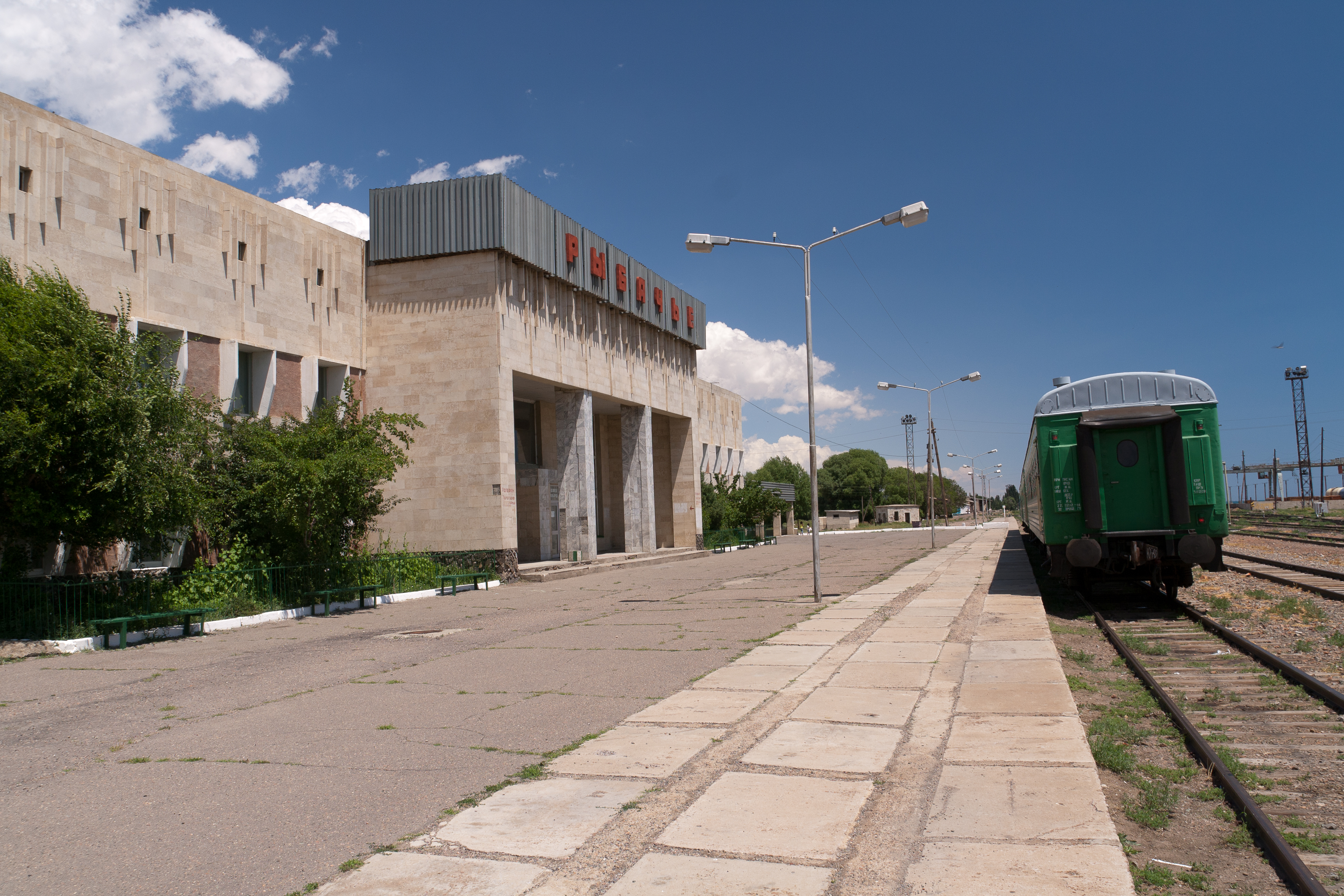
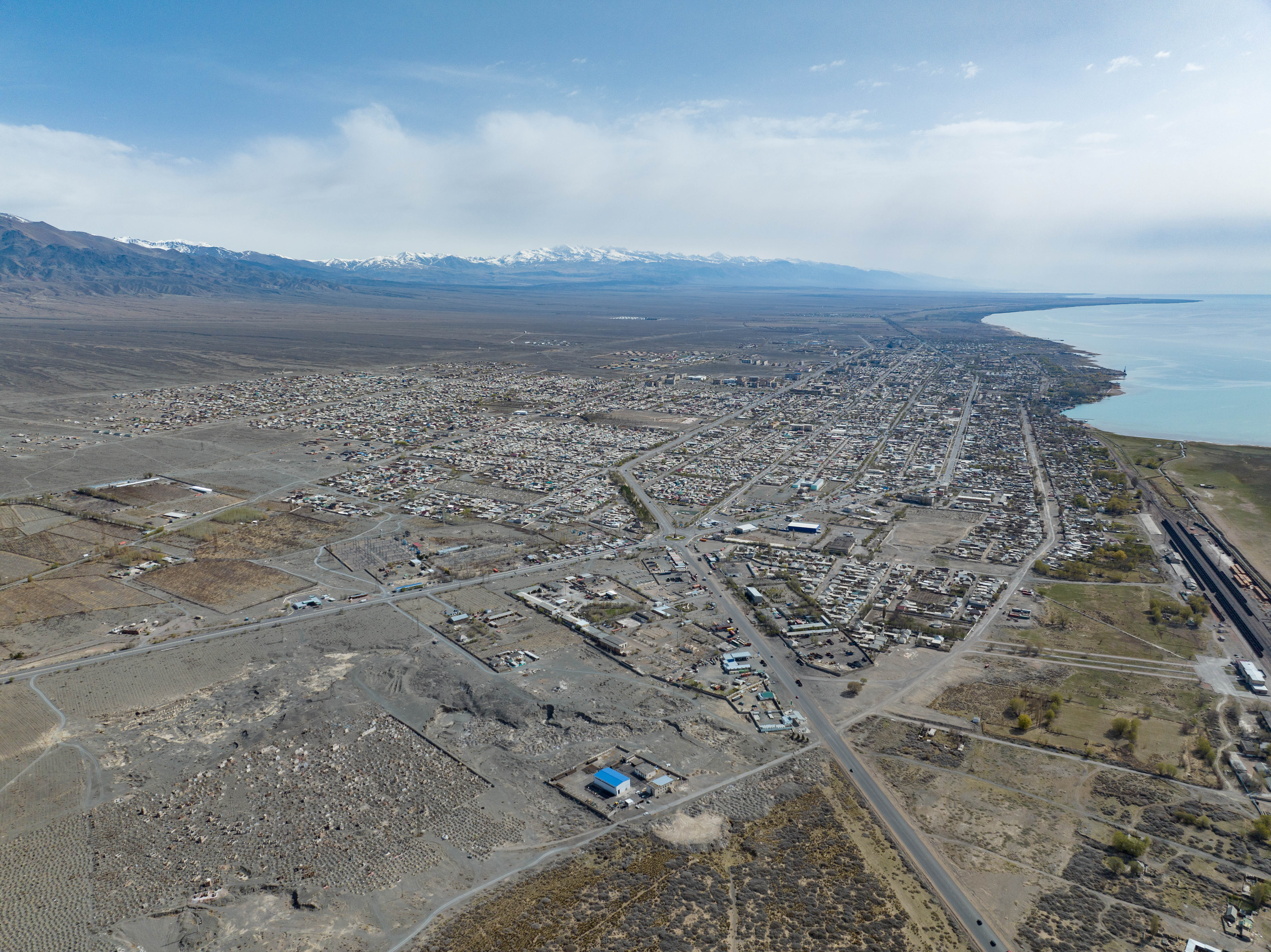
- From the top to bottom-right, Apartment Buildings in Balykchy, The Train station, Aerial view of the town

- Flag Coat of arms

- Location in Kyrgyzstan
- Coordinates: 42°28′N 76°11′E
- Country: Kyrgyzstan
- Region: Issyk-Kul Region
- Founded: 1884
- Current from: 1954

Area
  - Total: 38 km^{2} (15 sq mi)
- Elevation: 1,630 m (5,350 ft)

Population (2021)
  - Total: 51,305
  - Density: 1,400/km^{2} (3,500/sq mi)
- Postal code: 721900
- Area code: +996 3944

Balykchy (Kyrgyz: Балыкчы) is a town at the western end of Lake Issyk-Kul in Kyrgyzstan, at an elevation of about 1,900 metres. Its area is 38 square kilometres (15 sq mi), and its resident population was 42,875 in 2021 (both including Orto-Tokoy). A major industrial and transport centre (wool and crop processing, lake shipping, rail terminal, and road junction) during the Soviet era, it lost most of its economic base after the collapse of the Soviet Union and the closure of virtually all of its industrial facilities.

The main road from Bishkek, the capital of Kyrgyzstan, to China, a part of the ancient Great Silk Road, passes through Balykchy before it starts its long and arduous way across the alpine ranges of Naryn Province in central Kyrgyzstan to the Chinese border at Torugart Pass. Plans for the rail road from the Chinese border to Balykchy, where the line from Bishkek currently ends, are under discussion. Two other roads go around the north and south sides of Issyk Kul to Karakol and then around the east end of the Kungey Alatau to the far southeast of Kazakhstan.

== History ==
The history of Balykchy begins with a post station and farm, established by M. I. Bachin, retired soldier of Naryn Fort in Kyzyl Tokoy area in 1884. At the end of the 19th and beginning of the 20th century the settlement was known as Ketmaldy (the nearby river's name), Novodmitrievka (after the family name of the owner of a local stud-farm; E.S.Dmitriev), and Bachino (after M. I. Bachin). It was named Rybachye (fishing place in Russian) from 1909-1993. In the early 1990s, following the disintegration of the Soviet Union, the town was known as Issyk-Kul, taking the name of the adjacent lake. Shortly after independence, its name was changed to Balykchy which means fisherman in the Kyrgyz language (and also in its sister language Turkish).

== Demographics ==
Balykchy is the seventh largest town in Kyrgyzstan with a resident population, as of 2021, of 50,814 or 51,305 including Orto-Tokoy.

Historical populations in Balykchy
Year	Pop.	±% p.a.
1935	2,000	—
1939	5,400	+28.19%
1970	28,555	+5.52%
1979	33,716	+1.86%
1989	43,265	+2.53%
1999	42,346	−0.21%
2009	42,875	+0.12%
2021	51,305	+1.51%

== Climate ==
Climate data for Balykchy (1991–2020)
Month	Jan	Feb	Mar	Apr	May	Jun	Jul	Aug	Sep	Oct	Nov	Dec	Year
Daily mean °C (°F)	−3.4 (25.9)	−2.1 (28.2)	2.5 (36.5)	8.6 (47.5)	13.1 (55.6)	17.0 (62.6)	19.5 (67.1)	19.0 (66.2)	14.9 (58.8)	8.6 (47.5)	2.6 (36.7)	−2.0 (28.4)	8.2 (46.8)
Source: NOAA

== Transport ==
The small old airport is no longer in operation. The passenger railway station marks the end of the railway line from Bishkek; it has newly begun direct services in 2018 to/from Tashkent, as well as long existing rail services to Kazakhstan. In March 2018, Uzbekistan Railways began a new service, connecting Tashkent with Balykchy.

In 2022, construction began on a new 186 km extension of the existing railway from Balykchy to Karakeche, primarily meant to carry coal from mines at Karakeche to Bishkek. In June 2023, a railway between Balykchy and Bishkek was officially opened.
