= Chaek =

Chaek Kyrgyz: Чаек
- Village
- Location within Kyrgyzstan
- Coordinates: 41°55′40″N 74°30′50″E
- Country: Kyrgyzstan
- Region: Naryn Region
- District: Jumgal District
- Elevation: 1,682 m (5,518 ft)

Population (2021)
  - Total: 3,762
- Time zone: UTC+6

Chaek (Kyrgyz: Чаек) is a village in Naryn Region of Kyrgyzstan on the A361 highway which crosses the north of the region. Its population was 3,762 in 2021. It is the center of the Jumgal District. It is about 100km west of Kochkor and 45km west of Lake Song-Köl. It is the largest of several villages in an agricultural valley. Further west the scenery becomes more dramatic.

== Population ==
Historical population
Year	Pop.	±% p.a.
2009	7,009	—
2021	3,762	−5.05%
Note: resident population; Sources:

== Climate ==
Climate data for Chaek (1991–2020)
Month	Jan	Feb	Mar	Apr	May	Jun	Jul	Aug	Sep	Oct	Nov	Dec	Year
Daily mean °C (°F)	−15.1 (4.8)	−11.4 (11.5)	−1.0 (30.2)	9.3 (48.7)	14.0 (57.2)	16.8 (62.2)	19.2 (66.6)	18.8 (65.8)	14.6 (58.3)	7.3 (45.1)	−0.6 (30.9)	−10.5 (13.1)	5.1 (41.2)
Source: NOAA
