= Kökömeren =

River in Kyrgyzstan

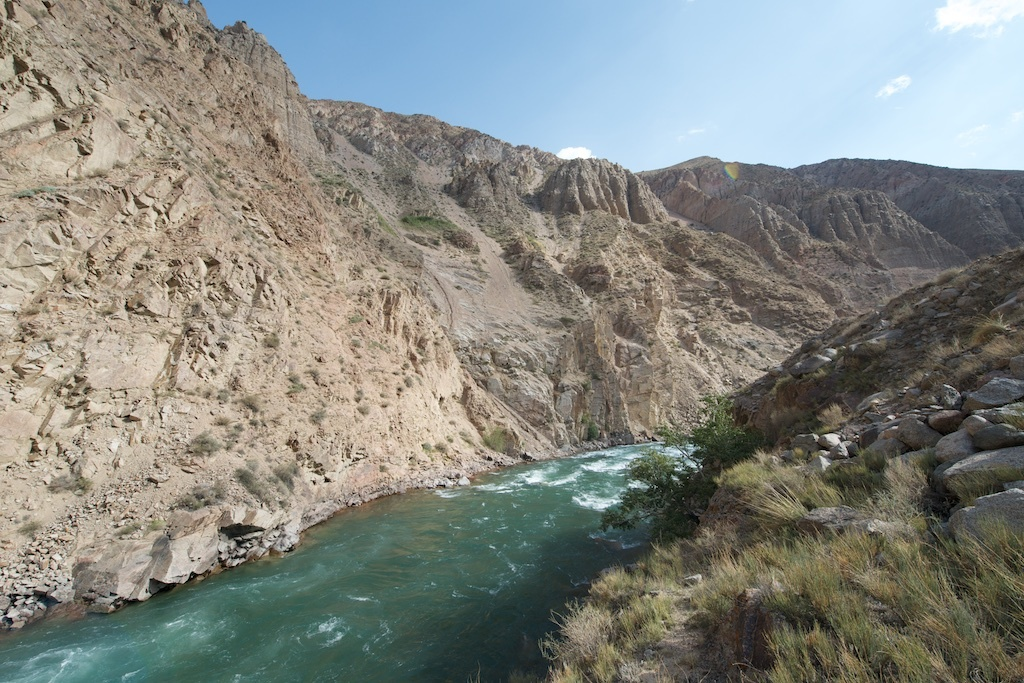
- Native name: Көкөмерен (Kyrgyz)

Location
- Country: Kyrgyzstan
- Region: Chüy Region, Naryn Region

Physical characteristics
- Source: Confluence of Suusamyr and Batysh Karakol
  - location: Jayyl District
  - coordinates: 42°07′21″N 74°03′43″E
  - elevation: 2,030 m (6,660 ft)
- Mouth: Naryn
  - location: Jumgal District
  - coordinates: 41°43′01″N 73°52′31″E
  - elevation: 1,127 m (3,698 ft)
- Length: 199 km (124 mi)
- Basin size: 10,400 km^{2} (4,000 sq mi)
- Discharge
  - average: 80.3 m^{3}/s (2,840 cu ft/s)

Basin features
- Progression: Naryn→ Syr Darya→ North Aral Sea
- Tributaries
  - left: Jumgal, Ming-Kush
  - right: Köbük-Suu

The Kökömeren (Kyrgyz: Көкөмерен) is a right tributary of the Naryn in Kyrgyzstan, flowing through Chüy Region (Jayyl District) and Naryn Region (Jumgal District). It is formed by the confluence of the Suusamyr and Batysh Karakol (Western Karakol) rivers. The Kökömeren is 199 kilometres (124 mi) long, has a drainage basin of 10,400 square kilometres (4,000 sq mi), and an average discharge of 80.3 cubic metres per second (2,840 cu ft/s).

== Etymology ==
The name Kökömeren is a Kyrgyz adaptation of the Mongolian khökh mörön, meaning "blue great river" (khökh meaning blue or light blue, and mörön meaning large river). The name is semantically equivalent to the Turkic Köksuu ("blue river"). The Atlas of the Kirghiz SSR (1987) describes the Kökömeren as having exceptionally clear, bluish water.

== Geography ==
The Kökömeren begins at the confluence of the Suusamyr and Batysh Karakol rivers and flows through the mountainous terrain of central Kyrgyzstan before joining the Naryn River. The average elevation of its drainage basin is approximately 2,800 m.

== Hydrology ==
The river is fed mainly by snowmelt and springs. Its mean annual discharge is 80.3 cubic metres per second (2,840 cu ft/s). The highest mean monthly discharge occurs in June (215 cubic metres per second (7,600 cu ft/s)), while the lowest occurs in March (29.7 cubic metres per second (1,050 cu ft/s)).

The river's high-water period generally begins in April and ends in September. Ice formation begins in October–November, and the river becomes ice-free in March–April.

== Tributaries ==
The major tributaries of the Kökömeren include the Muztör, Jaman-Echki, Aksuu, Karakol, Joojürök, Oykayyng, Köbük-Suu, Jumgal, and Ming-Kush rivers. More than 100 smaller tributaries also flow into the river, and several small lakes occur within its drainage basin.

== Economic use and hydropower ==
Water from the Kökömeren is used for irrigation. Settlements along the river include Kyzyl-Oy, Aral, Sary-Bulung, and Örnök.

The river has significant hydropower potential.

In June 2011, China and Kyrgyzstan signed a protocol of intent concerning the construction of a cascade of hydroelectric power plants on the Kökömeren River.

In December 2024, the Eurasian Development Bank (EDB) and the Kyrgyz ministries responsible for economy and energy signed a memorandum of cooperation concerning the proposed Suusamyr–Kökömeren hydropower cascade. The project envisages three hydroelectric power plants: Karakol (33 MW), Kökömeren-1 (360 MW), and Kökömeren-2 (912 MW), with a combined installed capacity of 1,305 MW. The project was included in Kyrgyzstan's National Energy Programme through 2035. The memorandum provided for preparatory studies, including a preliminary feasibility study and an assessment of potential environmental and social impacts.

In March 2025, the EDB agreed to finance preliminary feasibility studies for the proposed cascade.

On 8 August 2025, the Kyrgyz government signed an investment agreement with Central Asian Investment Holding concerning the proposed cascade. The preliminary project cost was estimated at US$3.2 billion, with the final amount to be determined following completion of the project documentation, feasibility study, and government review.

Whitewater rafting and fishing are popular recreational activities on the Kökömeren.

== See also ==
- Naryn (river)
- Suusamyr (river)
- Sarykamysh Range
