= Ak-Shyrak Massif =

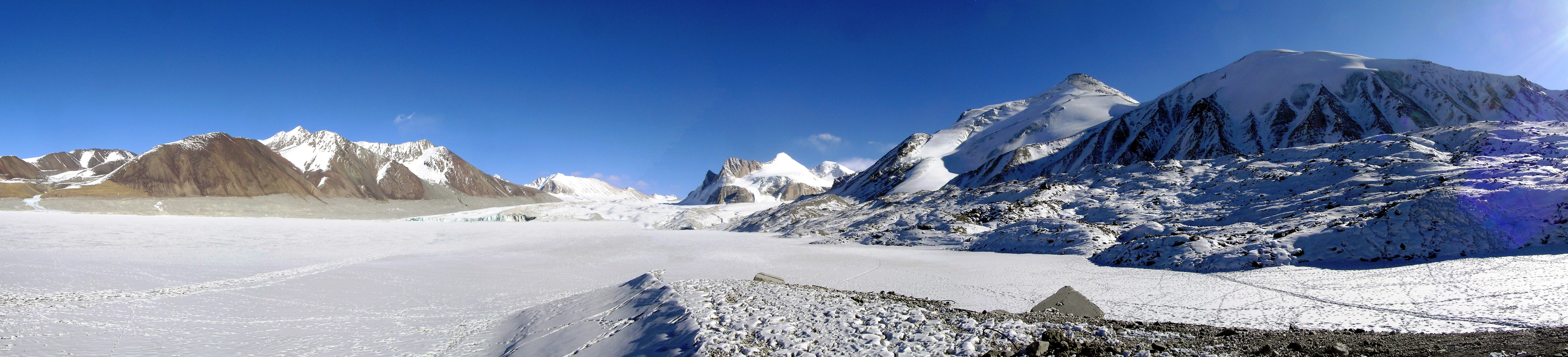

Highest point
- Peak: unnamed peak
- Elevation: 5,100 m (16,700 ft)
- Coordinates: 41°53′36″N 78°25′57″E

Dimensions
- Length: 60 km (37 mi)
- Width: 28 km (17 mi)

Naming
- Native name: Ак-Шыйрак тоо тоому (Kyrgyz)

Geography
- Location within Kyrgyzstan
- Country: Kyrgyzstan
- Region(s): Central and Inner Tien Shan

Geology
- Orogeny: Alpine orogeny
- Rock age(s): Proterozoic; Silurian–Carboniferous; uplift during Neogene–Quaternary
- Rock type(s): Sedimentary and effusive rocks; plagiogranite, syenite-diorite, gabbro-diabase, nepheline syenite, tourmaline-bearing granite

The Ak-Shyrak Massif (Kyrgyz: Ак-Шыйрак тоо тоому) is a major high-mountain massif located in the Central Tien-Shan of Kyrgyzstan. It is bounded by the Saryjaz Valley to the east and by the upper reaches of the Naryn River to the west. The massif extends from the southwest toward the northeast for approximately 60 kilometres (37 mi), with a maximum width of 28 kilometres (17 mi).

The massif has an average elevation of about 4,720 metres (15,490 ft), while its highest point reaches 5,100 metres (16,700 ft), located at the headwaters of a right tributary of the Jamansu River.

== Topography ==
The Ak-Shyrak Massif is characterized by extremely high absolute elevations and a strongly dissected alpine relief. The massif consists of three main ridges: the northern ridge (Sarychat, Eertash, Maitör), the central ridge (Kyzyleshme), and the southern ridge (Uchköl). The eastern parts of these ridges merge into a single high mountain node.

Ridge crests reach elevations of 4,500 to 5,000 m (14,800 to 16,400 ft), while the upper sections of valleys lie at 4,000 to 4,500 m (13,100 to 14,800 ft). The northern and southern foothills are marked by major tectonic faults.

== Geology ==
The massif is composed predominantly of sedimentary and effusive rocks of Proterozoic, Silurian, Devonian, and Carboniferous age. Intermontane depressions and river valleys contain Paleogene–Neogene red-colored sedimentary rocks, as well as Quaternary alluvial and glacial deposits.

Intrusive rocks are widespread and include plagiogranite, syenite–diorite, gabbro-diabase, nepheline syenite, and tourmaline-bearing granites. Structurally, the massif represents a complex uplifted block formed during the Neogene–Quaternary phase of the Alpine orogeny.

== Glaciers ==
The Ak-Shyrak Massif is one of the most heavily glaciated regions of the Tien-Shan. It contains 131 glaciers with a total area of approximately 432 square kilometres (167 sq mi). Major glaciers include the Petrov Glacier, Davydov Glacier, Council of People's Commissars Glacier, and Kumtor Glacier.

The Petrov Glacier, the largest in the massif, gives rise to the Naryn River. Valley glaciers typically reach lengths of 10 to 20 km (6.2 to 12.4 mi).

== Landscapes ==
At elevations of 3,500 to 4,000 m (11,500 to 13,100 ft), alpine meadow landscapes dominate. Higher elevations are characterized by glacial–nival landscapes, extensive moraines, and gravel deposits formed by retreating mountain glaciers.

Lower slopes and valley floors contain sparse high-altitude grasslands, while permanent snow and ice prevail above 4,000 m (13,000 ft).

== Mineral resources ==
The Ak-Shyrak Massif is rich in mineral resources. Gold and tin deposits are of industrial importance. The Kumtor gold deposit, one of the largest in Central Asia, is located on the northwestern foothills of the massif.
