= Jumgal Too =

Mountain range in Kyrgyzstan

- Location within Kyrgyzstan

Highest point
- Elevation: 4,121 m (13,520 ft)
- Coordinates: 42.0918°N 74.3810°E

Dimensions
- Length: 54 km (34 mi) W-S
- Width: 15 km (9.3 mi) N-S

Naming
- Native name: Жумгал кырка тоосу (Kyrgyz)

Geography
- Country: Kyrgyzstan
- Region: Naryn Region

Geology
- Rock age(s): Paleozoic, Cenozoic

Jumgal Too is a mountain range in internal Tian Shan in Kyrgyz Republic. It is part of Jumgal mountain system which includes also ranges Sandyk, Kara Moynok, Kindik, and Oy Kaiyn. It lies north of the Jumgal valley. The length of the range is 54 km, width - 15 km, and height up to 4121m. The Jumgal mountain range rises from east to west. The slopes of the mountains are uneven: the northern sides of the Jumgal and Oy Kaiyn mountains are steep and short, while the southern sides are wide and gently sloping. In contrast, the slopes of the Kindik, Kara Moynok, and Sandyk mountains are smoother. Streams feeding the Western and Eastern Karakol rivers flow down from the mountains. Small glaciers are found in the Kara Moynok and Oy Kaiyn mountains, with a total area of 7.3 km^{2} (3 sq mi).

== Geology ==
The geological structure of the mountain is highly complex. Its western section consists of a granite-diorite intrusion and Upper Proterozoic phyllite and quartzite formations, with thicknesses ranging from 500 to 3000 meters. The central part is primarily composed of Lower Paleozoic granites and granite-diorites. The eastern section is formed of Ordovician sedimentary rocks, including sandstones, tuffs, porphyrites, limestones, conglomerates, and other deposits, with thicknesses between 1000 and 4600 meters. In the intermontane depressions, Neogene and Quaternary sedimentary deposits are present. The mountain range contains nepheline syenite massifs, which are associated with aluminum ore deposits.

== Landscapes ==
The mountain landscapes change according to altitude zones. At the foothills, especially on the southern slopes, there are steppe areas (feather grass and Artemisia up to 2200–2300 meters. From 2200 to 2800 meters, there are meadow-steppes (feather grass and mixed herbs) with some forested areas. Between 2800 and 3300 meters, alpine meadows and meadow-steppes prevail. Above 3300 meters, there are rocky, scree-covered subnival and nival-glacial zones. The area is used for pastures.

== Climate ==
The climate varies by altitude and is generally continental. The average air temperature is –11.9°C in January and 12.5°C in July, with annual precipitation ranging from 300 to 400 mm.
