= Kabak Too =

Highest point
- Peak: Kashkasuu Chokusu
- Elevation: 4,144 m (13,596 ft)
- Coordinates: 41.724°N 74.539°E

Dimensions
- Length: 40 km (25 mi) W-S
- Width: 16 km (9.9 mi) N-S

Naming
- Native name: Кабак Тоо (Kyrgyz)

Geography
- Country: Kyrgyzstan
- Region: Naryn Region

Kabak Too is a mountain range in the inner Tian Shan in Naryn Region, Kyrgyzstan. It is located between Jumgal and Ming-Kush valleys. The length of the range is about 40 km, width - up to 16 km. The highest point is Kashkasuu Chokusu - 4,144 m (13,596 ft).
