= Moldo Too =

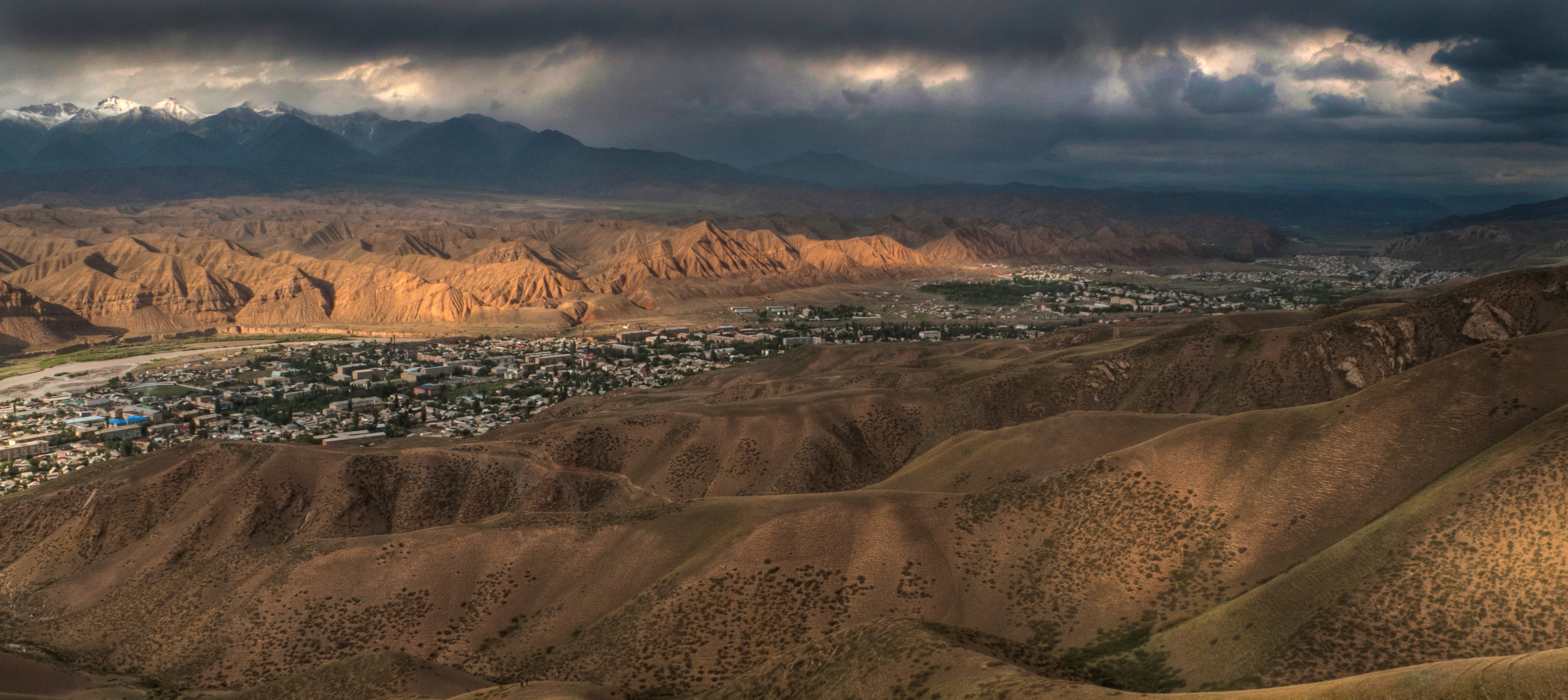
- Moldo Too Mountains in the background rise above Naryn

Highest point
- Elevation: 4,185 m (13,730 ft)

Dimensions
- Length: 110 km (68 mi) E-W
- Width: 26 km (16 mi) N-S

Naming
- Etymology: in Kyrgyz "Молдо" meaning round, and "Тоо" - mountains
- Native name: Молдотоо (Kyrgyz)

Geography
- Location within Kyrgyzstan
- Country: Kyrgyzstan
- Region: Naryn Province
- Range coordinates: 41°35′N 74°40′E

Geology
- Rock type: Composed of sedimentary rocks of Middle Paleozoic

The Moldo Too (Kyrgyz: Молдотоо) is a mountain range in the inner Tien Shan, Kyrgyzstan. The length of the range is approximately 110 km and the width - 26 km. The average altitude is about 3,600 m and the highest peak - 4,185 m. The range is mainly composed of sedimentary rocks of Middle Paleozoic.
