= Jumgal District =

Coordinates: 41°55′N 74°30′E

Jumgal Жумгал району
- District
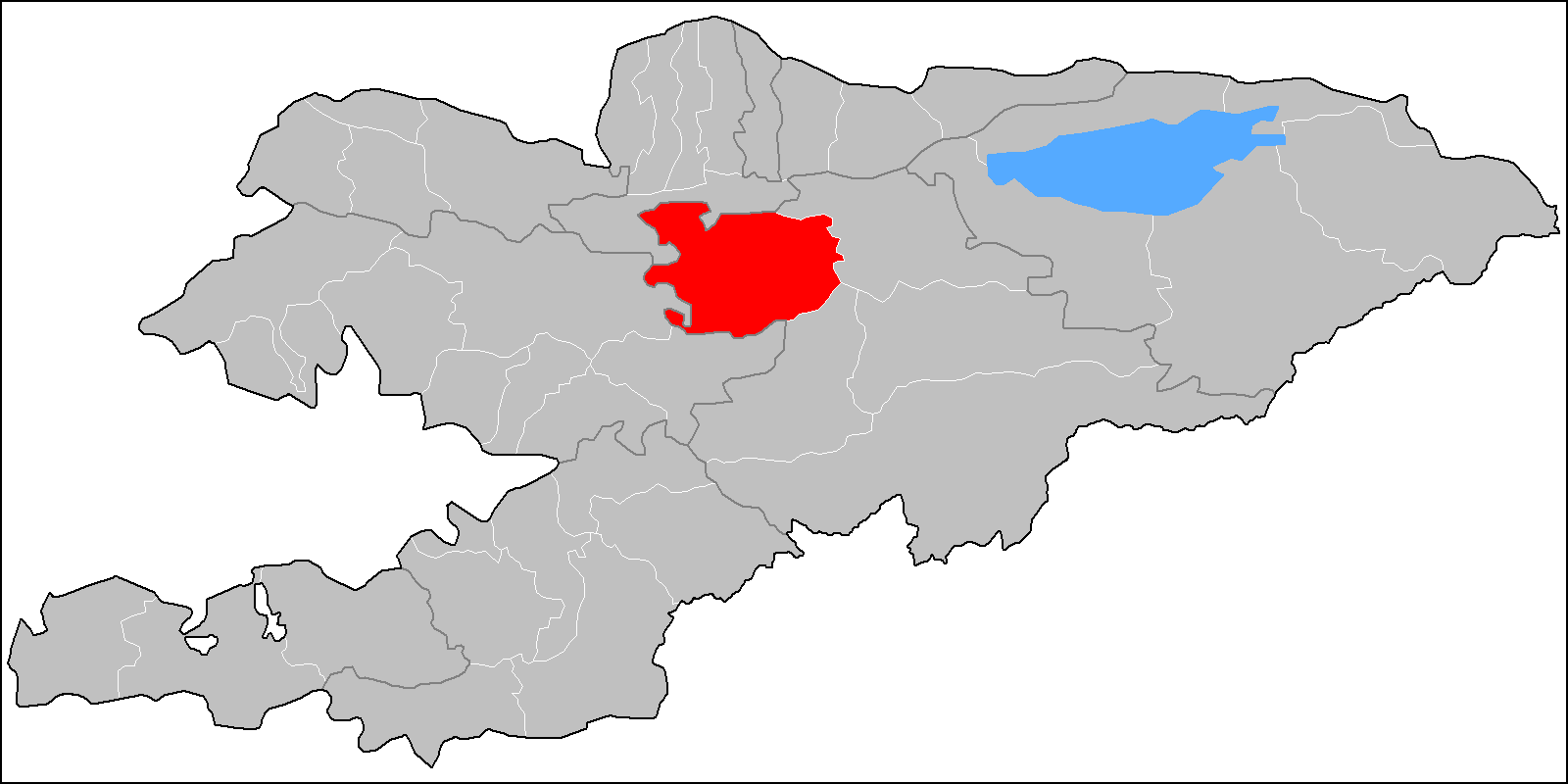
- Country: Kyrgyzstan
- Region: Naryn Region

Area
  - Total: 4,803 km^{2} (1,854 sq mi)

Population (2021)
  - Total: 44,866
  - Density: 9.341/km^{2} (24.19/sq mi)
- Time zone: UTC+6

Jumgal (Kyrgyz: Жумгал району, romanized: Jumgal rayonu) is a district of Naryn Region in central Kyrgyzstan. The administrative seat lies at Chaek. Its area is 4,803 square kilometres (1,854 sq mi), and its resident population was 44,866 in 2021. It is a mountainous district. Its main rivers are the Kökömeren (a tributary to the river Naryn) and its tributaries Jumgal, Suusamyr and Batysh Karakol.

== Population ==
Historical population
Year	Pop.	±% p.a.
1970	34,306	—
1979	41,493	+2.14%
1989	44,613	+0.73%
1999	40,902	−0.86%
2009	40,718	−0.05%
2021	44,866	+0.81%
Note: resident population; Sources:

== Populated places ==
In total, Jumgal District include 30 settlements in 13 rural communities (ayyl aymagy). Each rural community includes one or several villages. The rural communities and settlements in the Jumgal District are as follows:

1. Bash-Kuugandy (seat: Bash-Kuugandy)
2. Bayzak (seat: Bayzak)
3. Chaek (seat: Chaek; incl. Ak-Tatyr, Besh-Terek, Chukur-Akseki and Shorton)
4. Chong-Döbö (seat: Chong-Döbö)
5. Jangy-Aryk (seat: Jangy-Aryk; incl. Bazar-Turuk, Kyzart and Kyzyl-Emgek)
6. Jumgal (seat: Jumgal; incl. Lama)
7. Kabak (seat: Tabylgyty; incl. Aral, Keng-Suu, Kotur-Suu, Kyzyl-Korgon, Sary-Bulung and Tabylgy)
8. Kök-Oy (seat: Kök-Oy; incl. Kichi-Aral)
9. Kuyruchuk (seat: Kuyruchuk)
10. Kyzyl-Jyldyz (seat: Kyzyl-Jyldyz)
11. Ming-Kush (seat: Ming-Kush; incl. Kyzyl-Söök)
12. Süyümbay (seat: Tash-Döbö)
13. Tügöl-Say (seat: Tügöl-Say; incl. Epkin)
Settlements of the Jumgal District
