= Engilchek =

Engilchek or Inylchek may refer to:

- Engilchek, Kyrgyzstan, a village in Issyk Kul Province, Kyrgyzstan
- Engilchek (river), the river by which the above town is situated.
- Engilchek Glacier, which feeds the river.
