= Xuelian Feng =

Mountain in Xinjiang, China

- 雪莲峰
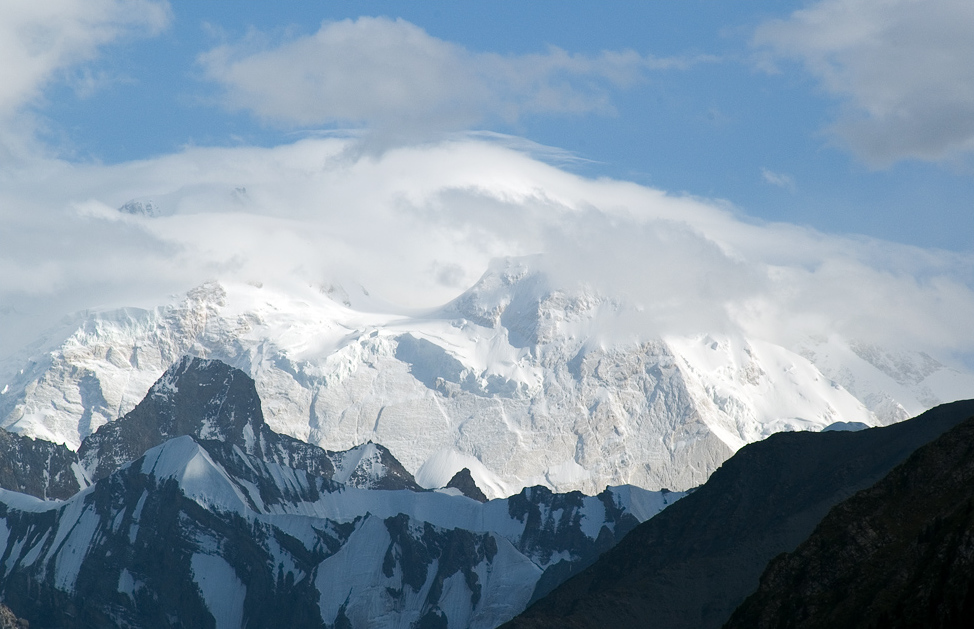
- Xuelian Feng is in the cloud on the right

Highest point
- Elevation: 6,627 m (21,742 ft)
- Prominence: 3,068 m (10,066 ft); Topographic Prominence Ranked 84th
- Listing: Ultra
- Coordinates: 42°15′42″N 80°53′24″E

Geography
- Location within China
- Location: Xinjiang, China
- Parent range: Tian Shan

Climbing
- First ascent: August 19, 1990 by Motochiro Fujita, Hideki Sakai, Mikio Suzuki, Etuo Nishikawa, Hiroshi Kojiri, Takuo Kato, Reiji Takahashi, Kazuo Tukushima
- Easiest route: Snow/ice/rock climb

Xuelian Feng (Chinese: 雪莲峰), also spelled Xuelian Peak or Snow Lotus Peak, is one of the major mountains of the Tian Shan mountain range. It lies in Xinjiang province, China, about 50 kilometres (30 mi) east-northeast of Jengish Chokusu, the highest peak in the range. It is notable for its large, steep relief above the nearby valleys, and for its large topographic prominence, ranking 84th by this measure. However, it ranks considerably lower by elevation. The mountain has five summits, with the highest being the north summit at 6,627 m (21,742 ft); the south summit has an elevation of 6,527 m (21,414 ft).

== Expeditions ==
The Tokai Section of the Japanese Alpine Club made four expeditions to Xuelian Feng, in 1986, 1988, 1989, and 1990, with the last being successful in ascending the main summit. (The 1989 expedition ascended the south summit and "Junction Peak", another subpeak to the south of the main summit, with elevation 6,450 m (21,161 ft), and came close to but did not reach the main summit.) In 1990, the expedition was led by Kazuo Tukushima, and ascended from the Karakume Glacier. The route ascended the southeast ridge of Junction Peak, then traversed a long (2 km/1.2 mi) corniced snow and rock ridge to reach the main summit tower. Other difficulties involved in the 2,500 m (8,200 ft) route included technical rock and ice walls, and snow gullies up to 70 degrees in steepness.

== See also ==
- List of ultras of Central Asia
- Muzart Pass
- Muzat River
