= Muzart Pass =

Mountain pass in Xinjiang, China

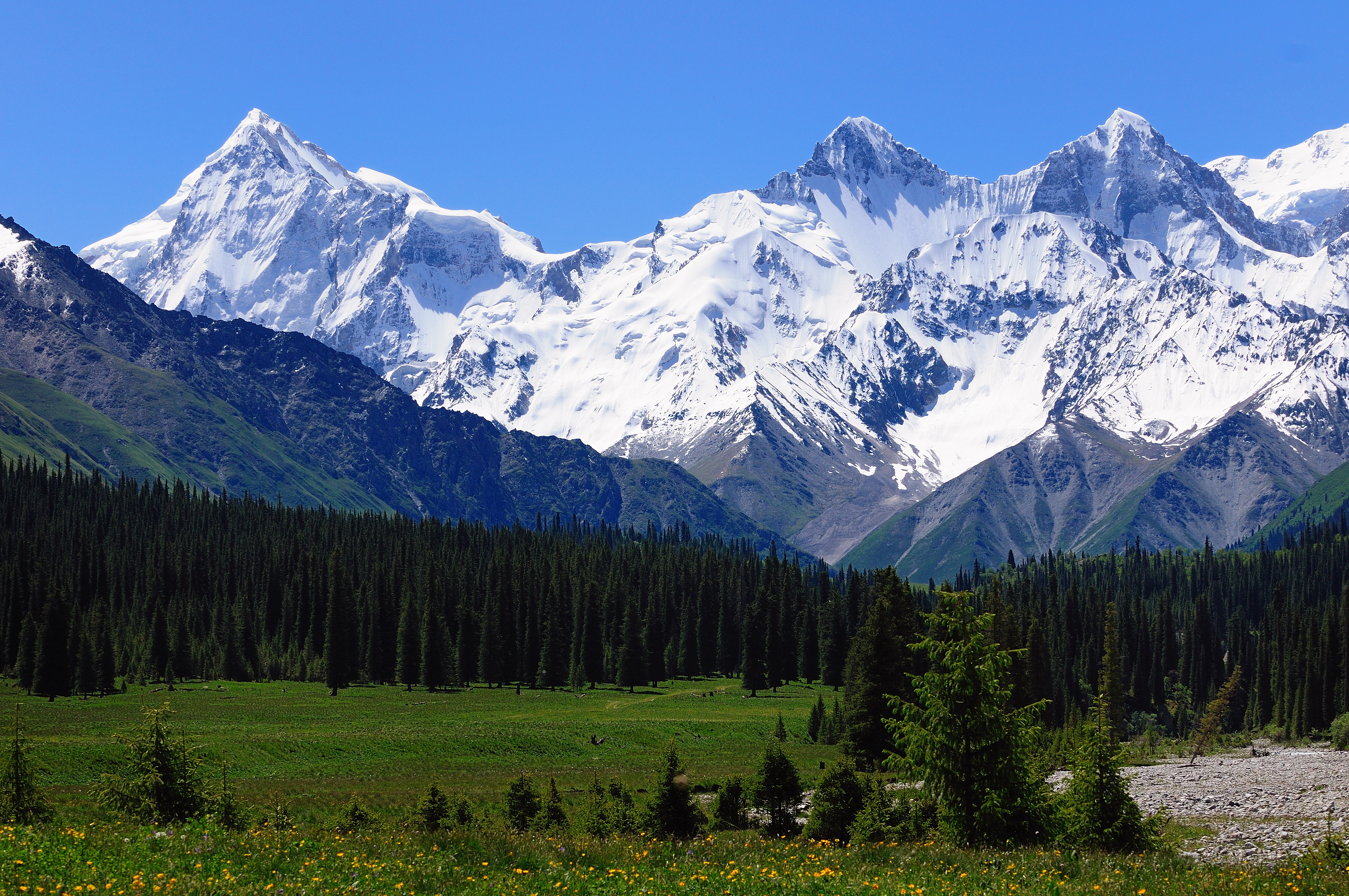
- Xiata Valley looking south, Muzart Pass turns right before the snow-capped mountains

- Location within Dzungaria Location within Southern Xinjiang
- Interactive map of Muzart Pass
- Elevation: 3,582 metres (11,752 ft)
- Traversed by: Xiata Trail (夏塔古道) or Xiate Trail (夏特古道)

Third Approach
- Location: between Ili Prefecture and Aksu Prefecture in Xinjiang, China
- Range: Tian Shan
- Coordinates: 42.359°N 80.798°E

Muzart Pass
- Traditional Chinese: 木扎爾特達坂
- Simplified Chinese: 木扎尔特达坂
Transcriptions

The Muzart Pass, Muz-art Pass, or Muzat Pass (Chinese: 木扎尔特达坂) is a high mountain pass that crosses the Tian Shan mountains in Xinjiang, China. It connects the city of Aksu in Tarim Basin with the city of Yining (Kulja) in the upper Ili River valley. It is located on the county boundary between Zhaosu County in Ili Prefecture and Baicheng County in Aksu Prefecture. The route over Muzart Pass is more commonly referred to as Xiata Trail (Chinese: 夏塔古道) or Xiate Trail (Chinese: 夏特古道) by the Chinese, Xiata being the name of the village in Tekes River valley at the base on the northern side of the route.

China National Highway 219 is in the process of being extended to cross Tian Shan connecting Zhaosu County with Wensu County in Tarim Basin. There are two routes under investigation -- the western and shorter route will traverse Muzart Pass.

== Etymology ==
According to Chinese sources, muz-art is derived from the Mongolic word for "glacier". It has also been interpreted to mean "ice pass" by Western sources as that is its meaning if read as Uzbek.

== History ==
British explorer Henry Lansdell, who traversed this route in the late 1800s, believed the famous Chinese explorer Xuanzang who inspired the Chinese classic Journey to the West used this mountain pass in the 7th century on his journey to India. However, number of scholars argue that it was Bedel Pass, as Xuanzang described the passage was northwest of "Kingdom of Baluka", modern day city of Aksu.

During the Qing dynasty, this pass was of strategic military importance as it was the main artery of communication between Tarim Basin in southern Xinjiang and the Qing power base at Ili in northern Xinjiang. Due to the Muzart Glacier, the Qing government had spent much labor keep this mountain pass traversable. During the Dungan Revolt of 1862–1877 by Yakub Beg, this labor stopped and it became impassible. Around 1870 during the revolt, the Russians took control of the pass to prevent Yakub Beg from advancing on Kulja, trade interest that the Russians acquired in Treaty of Kulja. After the Qing reconquest of Xinjiang in 1879, the initially negotiated Treaty of Livadia between Russian Empire and Qing, if ratified, would have ceded this mountain pass along with much of Ili Valley to Russia. With the support other European powers, the treaty was renegotiated and became the 1881 Treaty of Saint Petersburg. In 1907, future-President of Finland Gustaf Mannerheim, while serving as an intelligence officer in the Imperial Russian Army, passed through here. His mission was to determine the feasibility of invading China by the Russian Empire.

In 1992, the Narynkol–Muzart border crossing with Kazakhstan was temporarily opened. It was hoped a highway would be built over this pass, allowing the port to connect Tarim Basin with Kazakhstan. However, that never happened. Thus, the crossing was closed as it lacked traffic.

In recent years, Xiata Hot Springs, a tiny village on the north slope downhill from the pass, has been developed into a tourist destination and there are tour groups that would traverse part of the trail.

== See also ==
- Muzat River
- Xuelian Feng
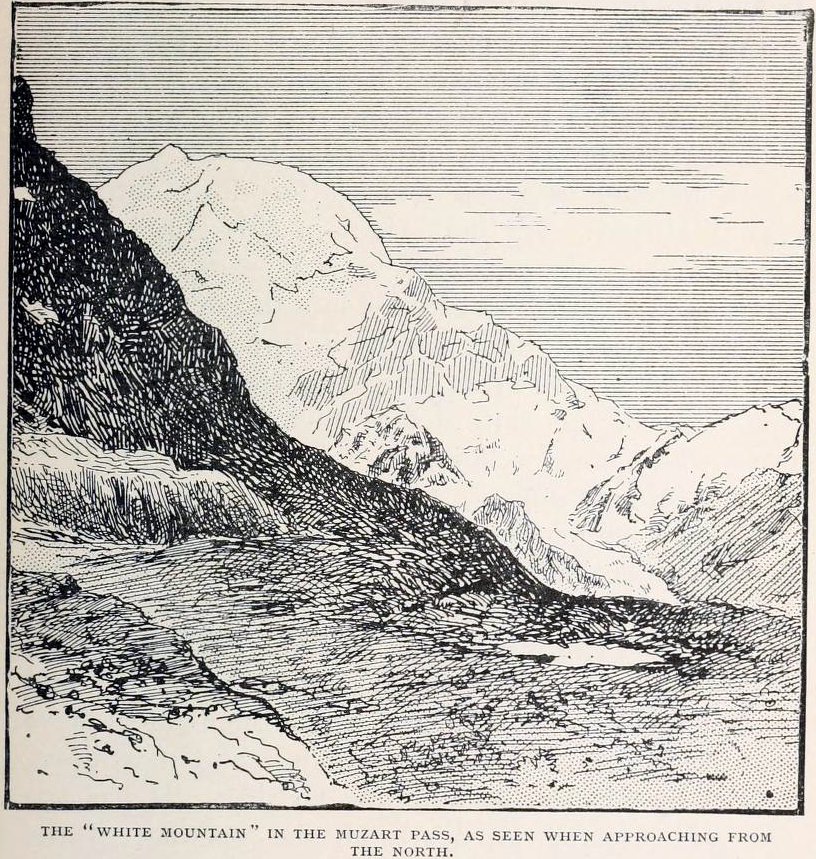
"White mountain" in the Muzart Pass sketched by Henry Lansdell in 1893

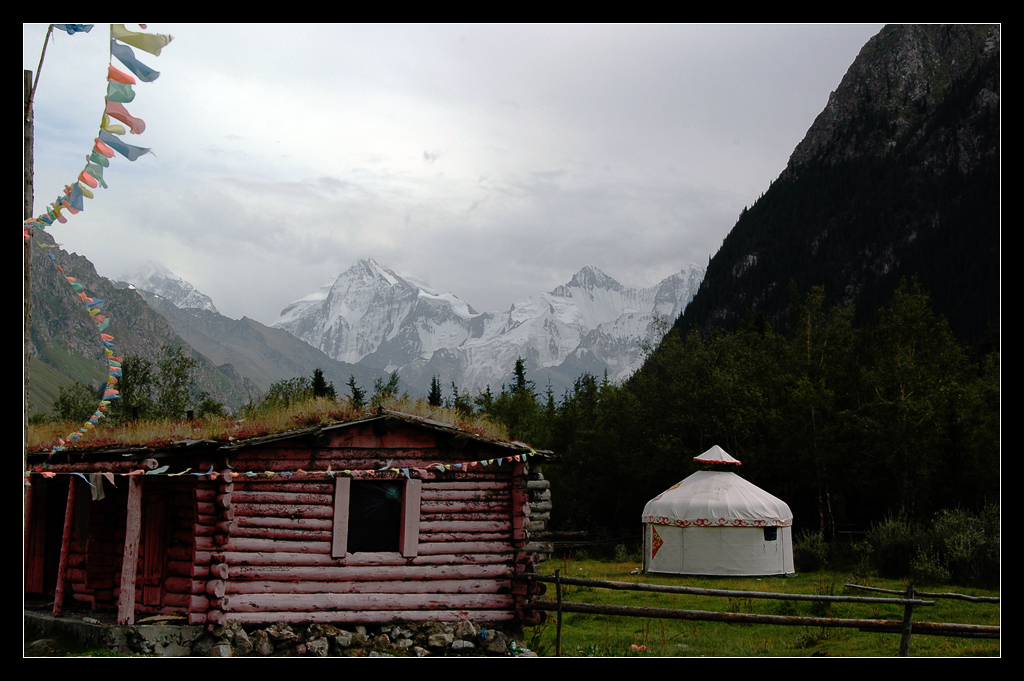
Xiata Hot Springs, a settlement on the north slope that has been developed into a tourist destination
