= Toshkan River =

River in China and Kyrgyzstan

Toshkan
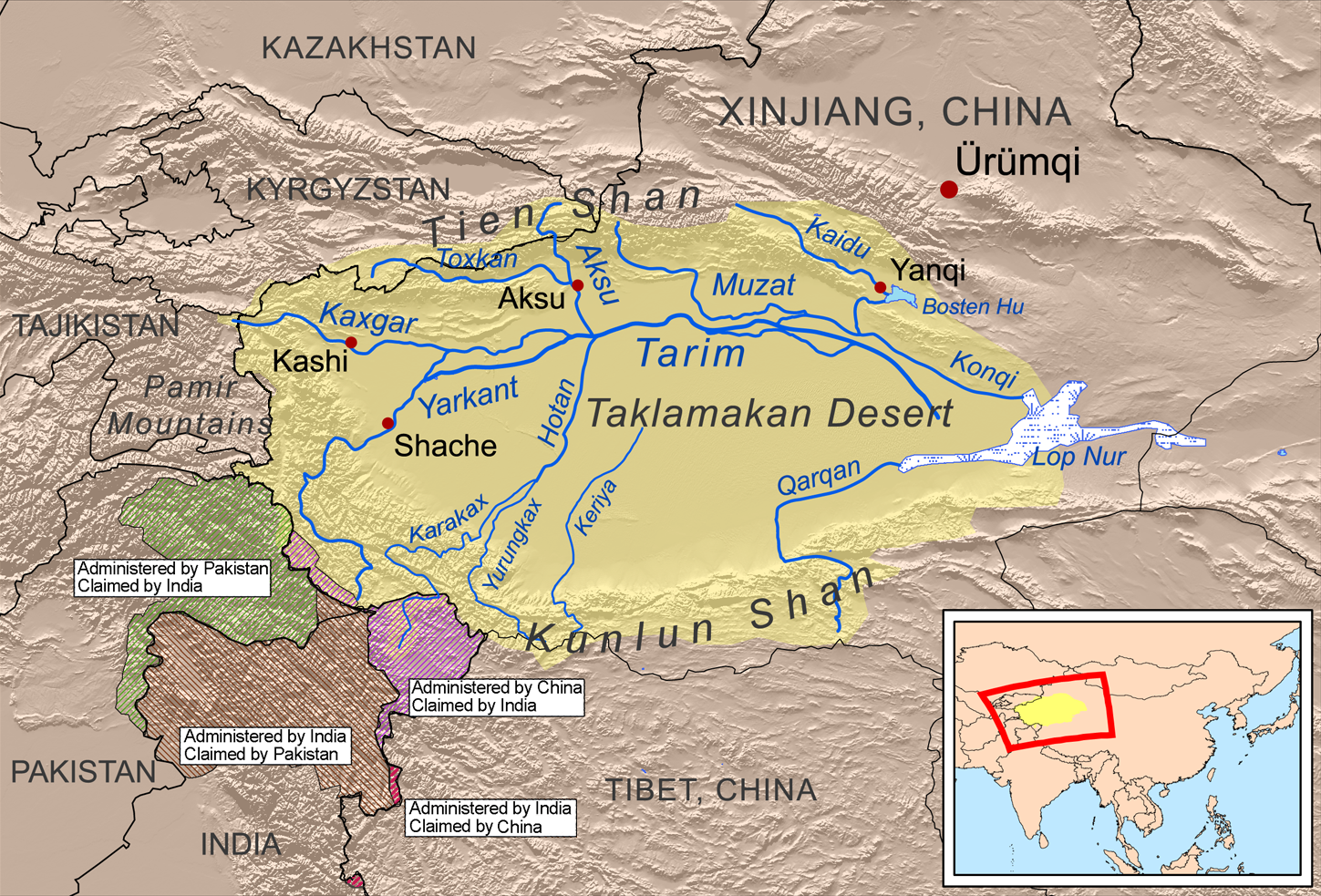
- Map showing the rivers of the Tarim Basin

Location
- Country: Kyrgyzstan, China

Physical characteristics
- Mouth: Aksu
  - coordinates: 41.1874°N 80.0931°E

Basin features
- Progression: Aksu→ Tarim→ Taitema Lake

The Toshkan (Uyghur: توشقان دەرياسى, romanized: Toshqan deryasi, cyrillized: Тошқан деряси; Kyrgyz: Какшаал, romanized: Kakshaal, arabized: قاقشاال) is a river in the Tien Shan mountains in the border area between China and Kyrgyzstan. It is 345 kilometres (214 mi) long, and has a drainage basin of 8,270 square kilometres (3,190 sq mi) in Kyrgyzstan. The Toshkan has its sources in the At-Bashy Range and Kakshaal Too south of the Kyrgyzstani city of Naryn. In its uppermost course, upstream of the confluences with the rivers Müdürum and Kökkyya, it is called Aksay; from these confluences to the border with China, it is called Kakshaal. It then flows towards the east and into the Xinjiang province of China. It continues east, running parallel to the Tien Shan mountains, until its confluence with the Aksu River near the city Aksu. The Toshkan is the largest tributary of the Aksu.
