= Merzbacher =

Merzbacher is a German surname. Notable people with the surname include:

- Eugen Merzbacher (1921–2013), American physicist
- Leo Merzbacher (1809–1856), German-American rabbi
- Ludwig Merzbacher (1875–1942), German neuroscientist and psychiatrist

== See also ==
- Lake Merzbacher, a lake in Kyrgyzstan
