= Engilchek Glacier =

Glacier in Kyrgyzstan

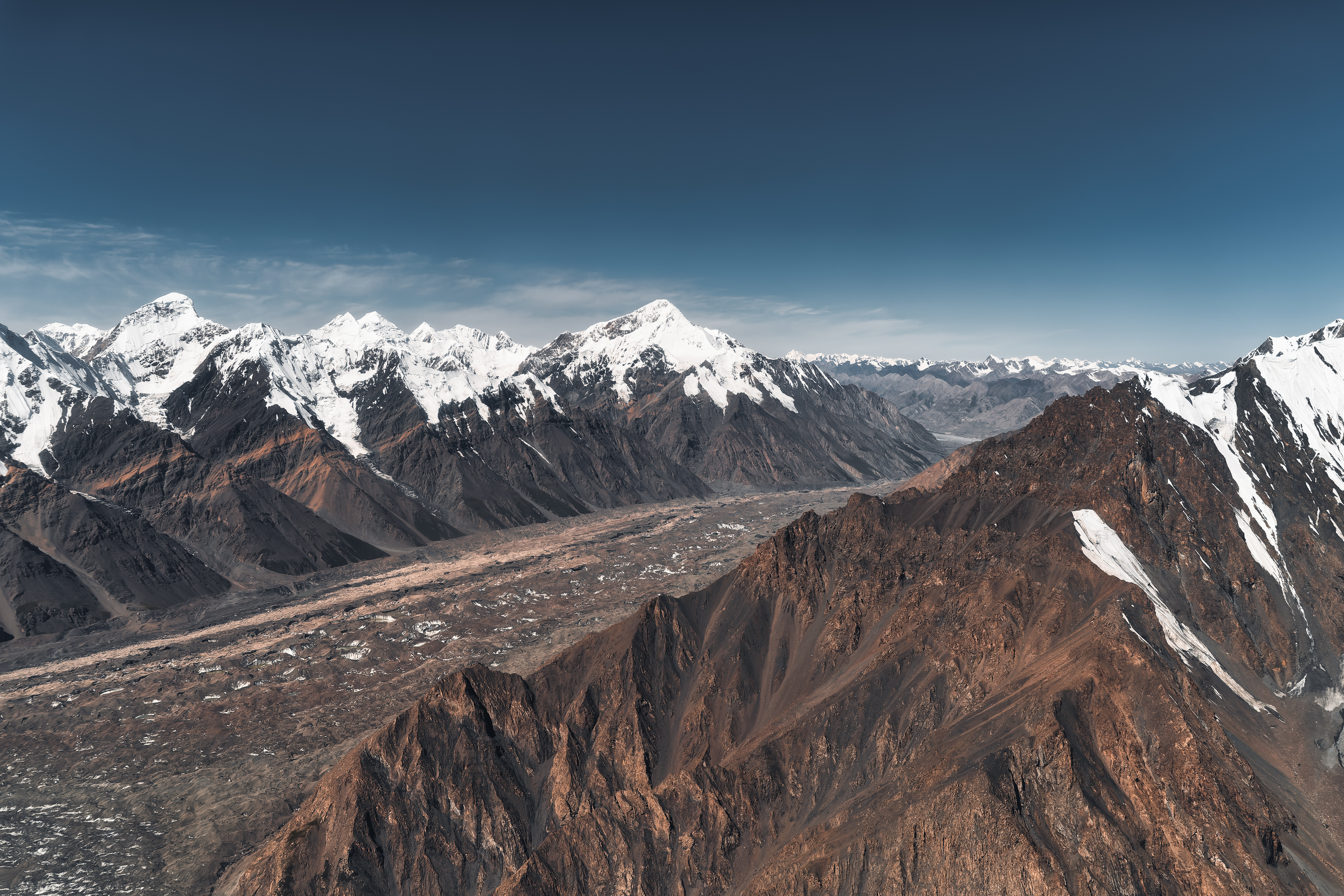
- Aerial view of the glacier surface on South Engilchek Glacier

- Location within Kyrgyzstan
- Type: Valley glacier
- Location: Central Tian Shan mountains, Kyrgyzstan, China, and Kazakhstan
- Coordinates: 42°09′30″N 79°56′0″E
- Area: 17.2 square kilometres (7 mi^{2})
- Length: 60.5 kilometres (38 mi)

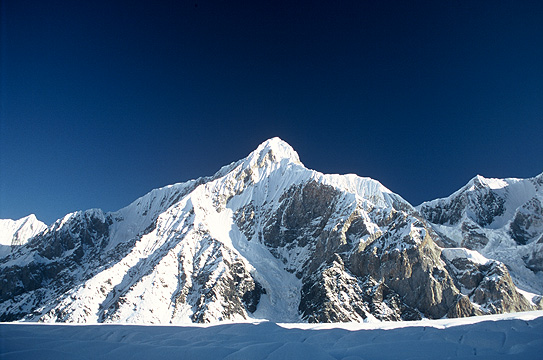
Gorkiy Peak from South Engilchek Glacier

Engilchek Glacier (Kyrgyz: Эңилчек, Russian: Энильчек - Enilchek, also Иныльчек - Inylchek) is a glacier in the Central Tian Shan Mountains of Issyk-Kul Region, northeastern Kyrgyzstan. Its snout is 50 km east of the village of Engilchek. The South Engilchek Glacier ranks as the sixth longest non-polar glacier in the world and is the largest and fastest moving glacier in Kyrgyzstan. The main glacier has two arms, the North and South Engilchek Glaciers. The latter is longer and provides an overall length of 60.5 kilometres (38 mi). with an area of 17.2 square kilometres (7 mi^{2}) and an ice thickness of roughly 150–200 m in the bottom parts. The glacier stems from the Chinese-Kazakh-Kyrgyz massif of Khan Tengri and Pik Pobedy and the upper part of the glacier falls in all three countries. Meltwater from the glacier feeds the Engilchek River, a tributary of the Saryjaz (known as Aksu in China), which crosses the Chinese border into the Tarim Basin. Water from this glacier also feeds the seasonal glacial Lake Merzbacher which causes frequent glacial lake outburst floods in the Engilchek River valley.
