= Lake Merzbacher =

Lake in Kyrgyzstan

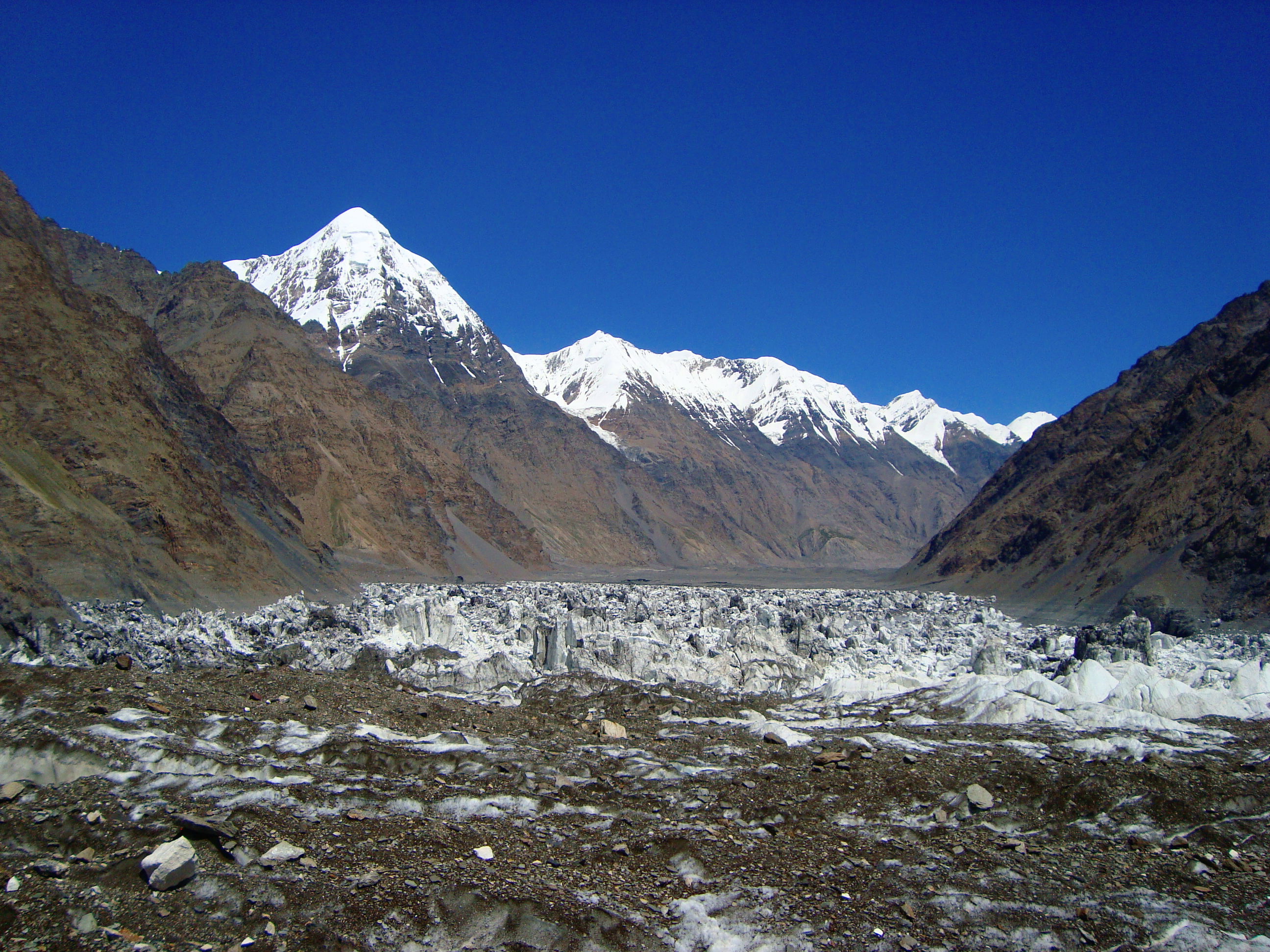
- Lake Merzbacher after outburst

- Location within Kyrgyzstan Location within Asia
- Coordinates: 42°12′N 79°52′E
- Lake type: Glacier lake
- Primary inflows: Glaciers
- Primary outflows: Engilchek River
- Basin countries: Kyrgyzstan
- Surface elevation: 3,304 metres (10,840 ft)

Lake Merzbacher (Kyrgyz: Мерцбахер көлү) is a moraine glacier lake located in east Kyrgyzstan between the north and south Engilchek Glaciers in the Tien Shan Mountains. It is often called the "Disappearing Lake" because it drains every year as the ice melts, often causing a glacial lake outburst flood. The lake was named after a German explorer, Gottfried Merzbacher, who led an expedition in the area in 1903. An ice dam prevents the lake from draining through the majority of the year. However, when a hole finally melts through the dam, the lake drains within three days. When this happens, the lake's discharge can be up to 1000 m^{3} a second which causes destruction of infrastructure and creates major flooding downstream. It goes through this cycle of appearing, expanding and then draining annually.
