= Uchköl =

- Native name: Үчкөл (Kyrgyz)

Location
- Country: Kyrgyzstan

Physical characteristics
- Source
  - location: Southern slope of the Terskey Alatoo (central Tien Shan)
- Mouth: Saryjaz River
  - coordinates: 41°55′37″N 79°03′21″E
- Length: 87 km (54 mi)
- Basin size: 1,400 km^{2} (540 sq mi)
- Discharge
  - average: 11.8 m^{3}/s (420 cu ft/s)

Basin features
- Progression: Saryjaz (Aksu) → Tarim→ Taitema Lake

The Uchköl (Kyrgyz: Үчкөл) is a river in the central Tien Shan in Kyrgyzstan and a right tributary of the Saryjaz River. The river is 87 km (54 mi) long, with a drainage basin area of 1,400 km^{2} (540 sq mi). It originates on the southern slope of the Terskey Alatoo. In its upper reaches it is known as Sarychat, while in the middle course it is called Eertash; in the lower course, after turning eastward, it is known as Uchköl.

The basin contains 165 glaciers (total area 326.6 km^{2} (126.1 sq mi)) and 13 lakes. The valley is used as pastureland.

== Course ==
Uchköl rises on the southern slope of the Terskey Alatoo. In its upper reaches it is known as the Sarychat and flows eastward. In its middle course, where it is called the Eertash, it turns south and flows through a narrow valley. In its lower course the river turns eastward, takes the name Uchköl, and joins the Saryjaz River.

== Hydrology ==
The mean annual discharge at the mouth is 11.8 m^{3}/s (420 cu ft/s). The highest flows occur in July and August, reaching 45 to 50 m^{3}/s (1,600 to 1,800 cu ft/s), while the lowest flows occur in February and March, when discharge falls to 1.5 to 2.1 m^{3}/s (53 to 74 cu ft/s).

== Glaciers and lakes ==
The Uchköl basin includes 165 glaciers with a combined area of 326.6 km^{2} (126.1 sq mi), and 13 lakes.
