= Engilchek, Kyrgyzstan =

Engilchek Эңилчек
- Location within Kyrgyzstan
- Coordinates: 42°02′02″N 79°05′23″E
- Country: Kyrgyzstan
- Region: Issyk-Kul Region
- District: Ak-Suu District
- Elevation: 2,500 m (8,200 ft)

Population (2023)
  - Total: 138
- Time zone: UTC+6

Engilchek (Kyrgyz: Эңилчек, Russian: Энильчек) is a village in Ak-Suu District, southeast Issyk-Kul Region, Kyrgyzstan. It is situated at the confluence of the rivers Saryjaz and Engilchek. With the closure of the tin mine, the population fell from 5,000 to less than 20 families. As of 2021, its population was 140. It lies at the head of one of the few good roads into the southeast of the province, and is therefore a base for mountaineers and serious hikers. The road west to Ak-Shyyrak has been impassable since at least 2008. The Engilchek Glacier is about 50 km east of the town.

== Population ==
Historical population
Year	Pop.	±% p.a.
2009	345	—
2021	140	−7.24%
Note: resident population; Sources:
