= Aksu City =

Aksu: ئاقسۇ شەھىرى (Uyghur); 阿克苏市 (Chinese)
- County-level city
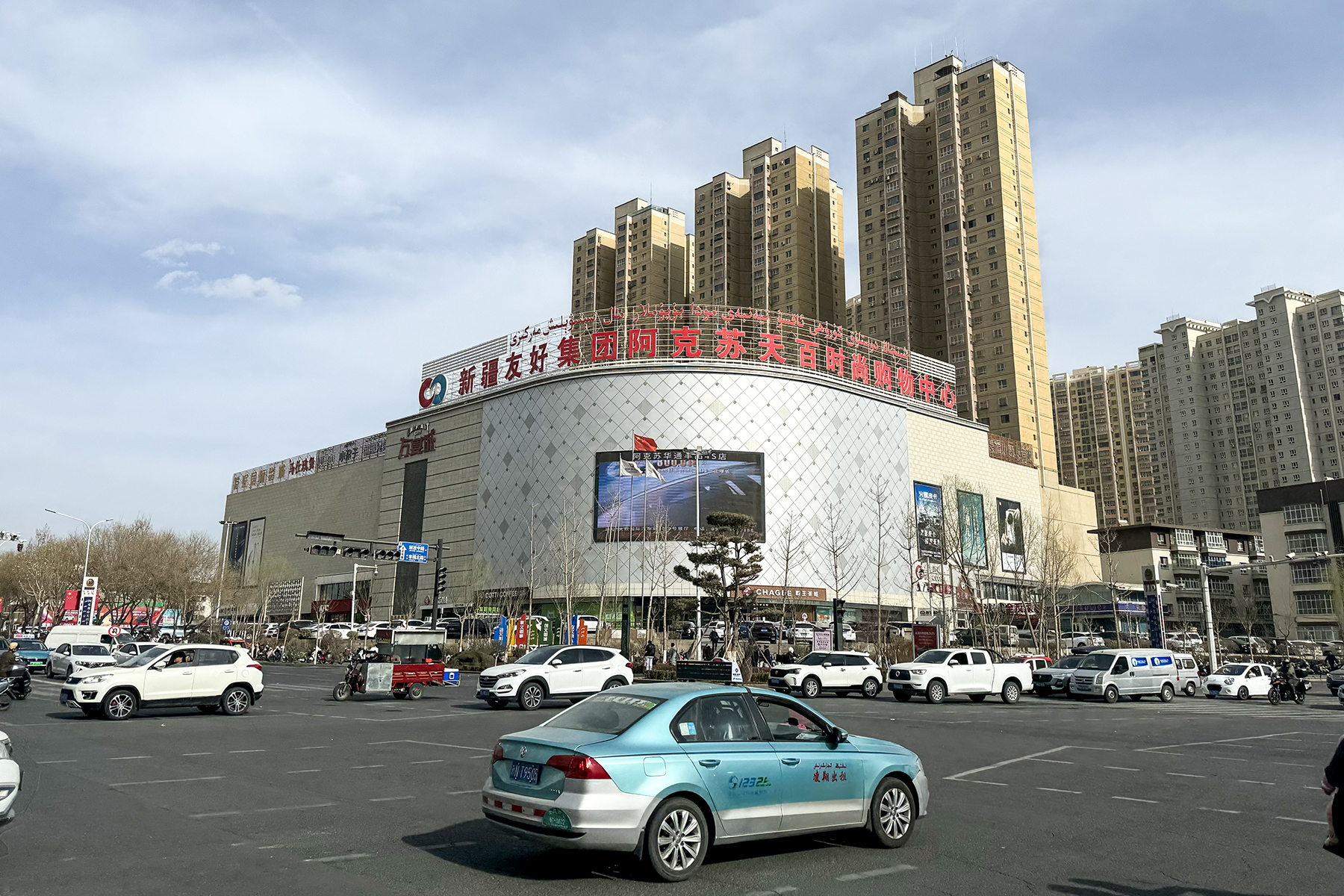
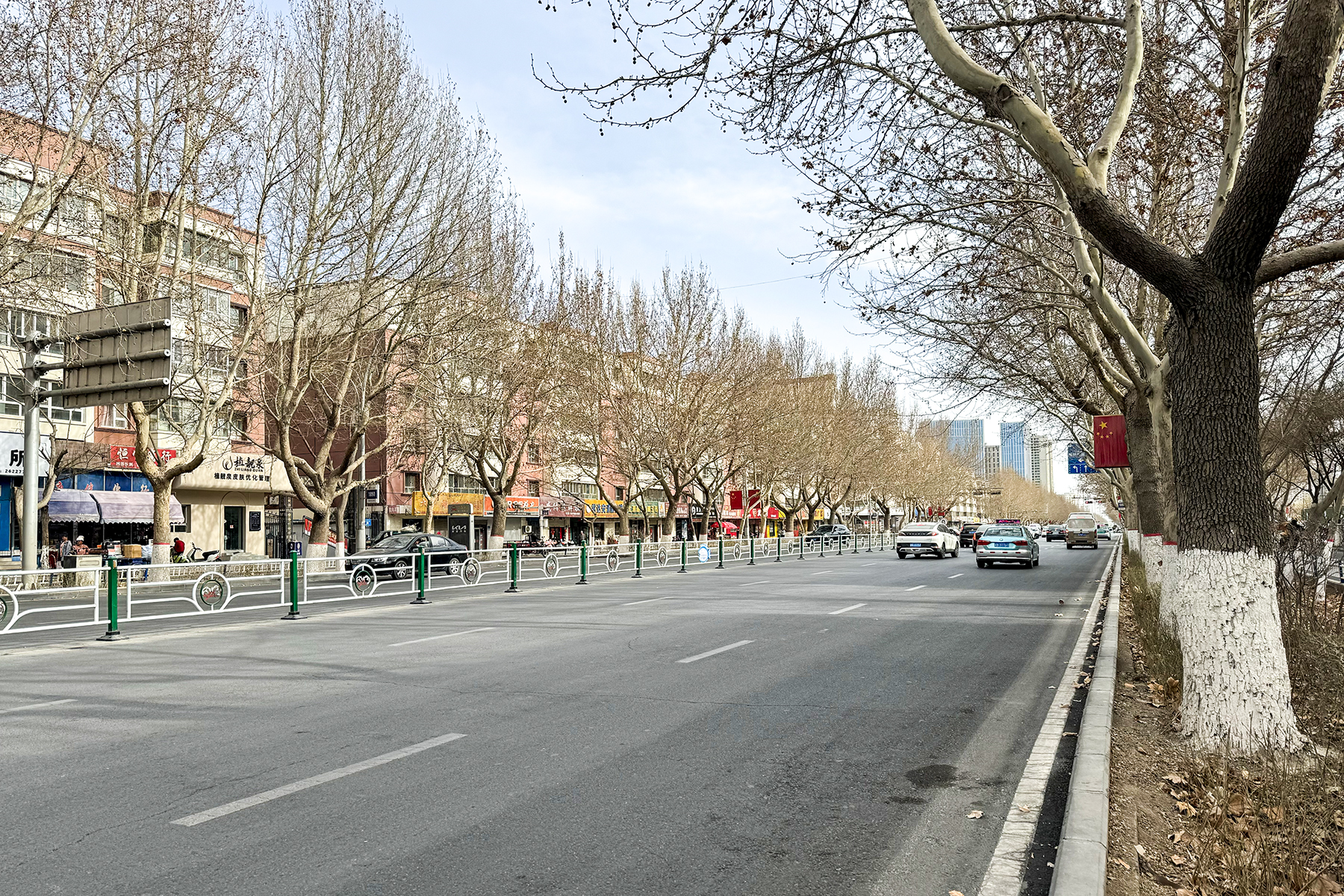
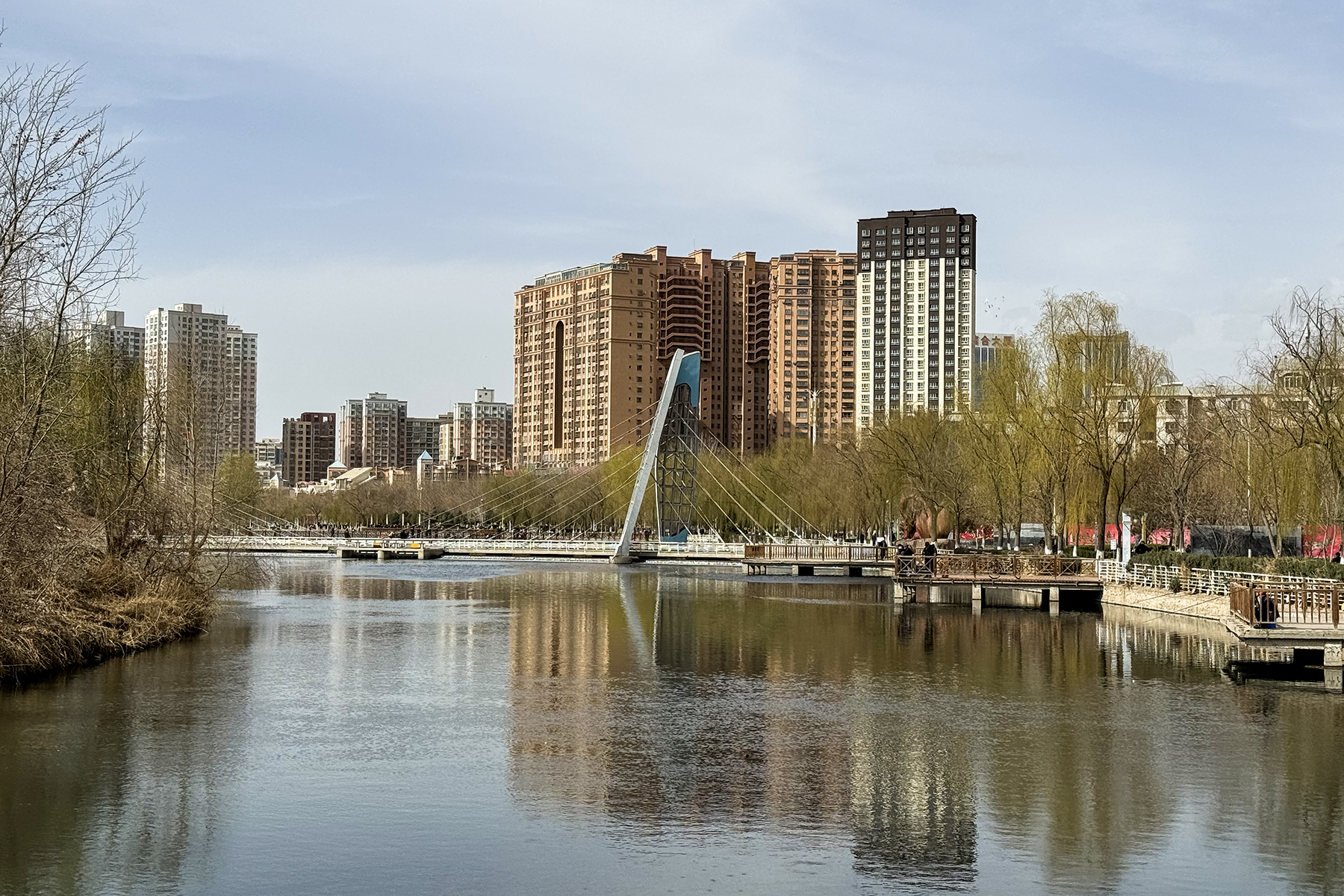
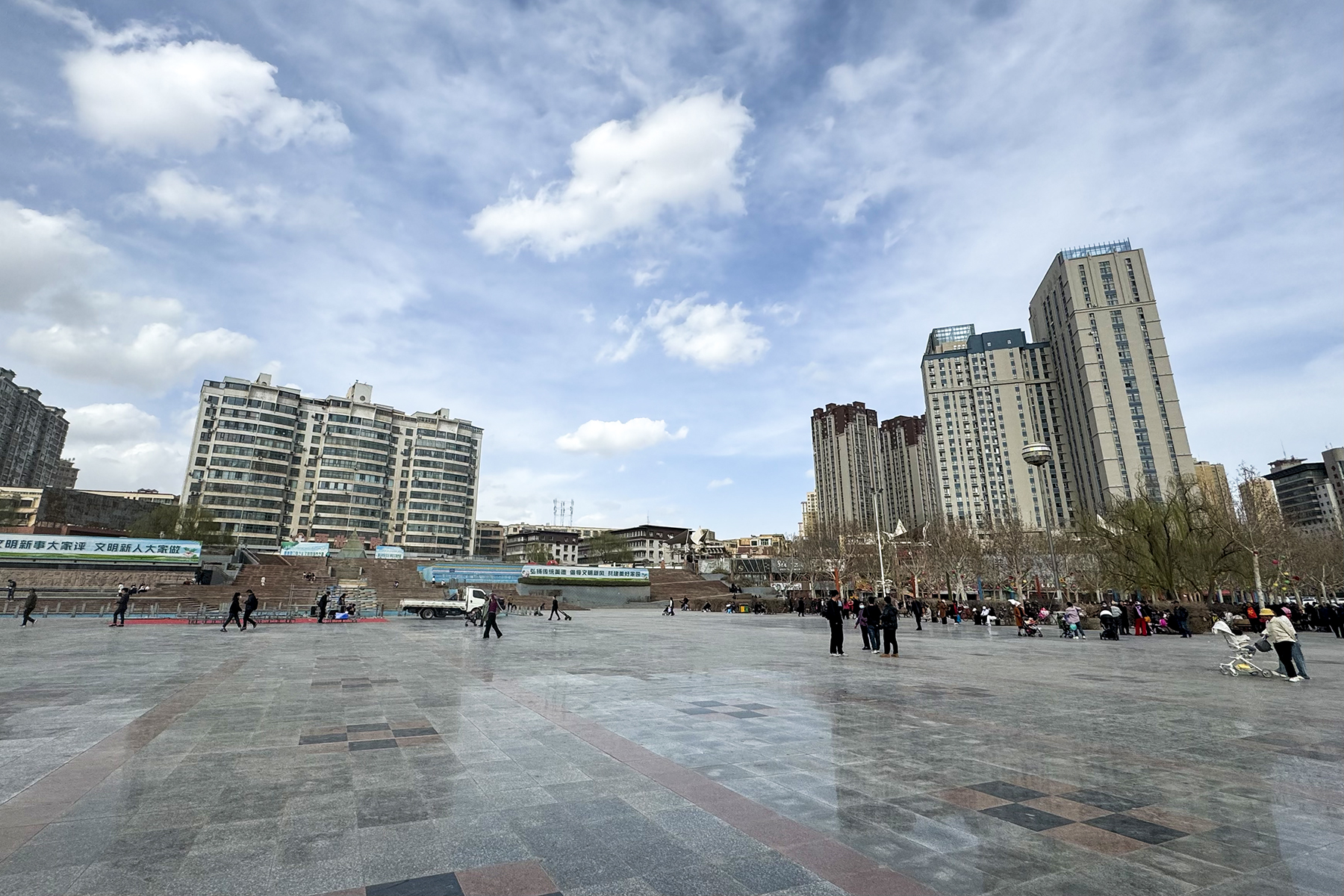
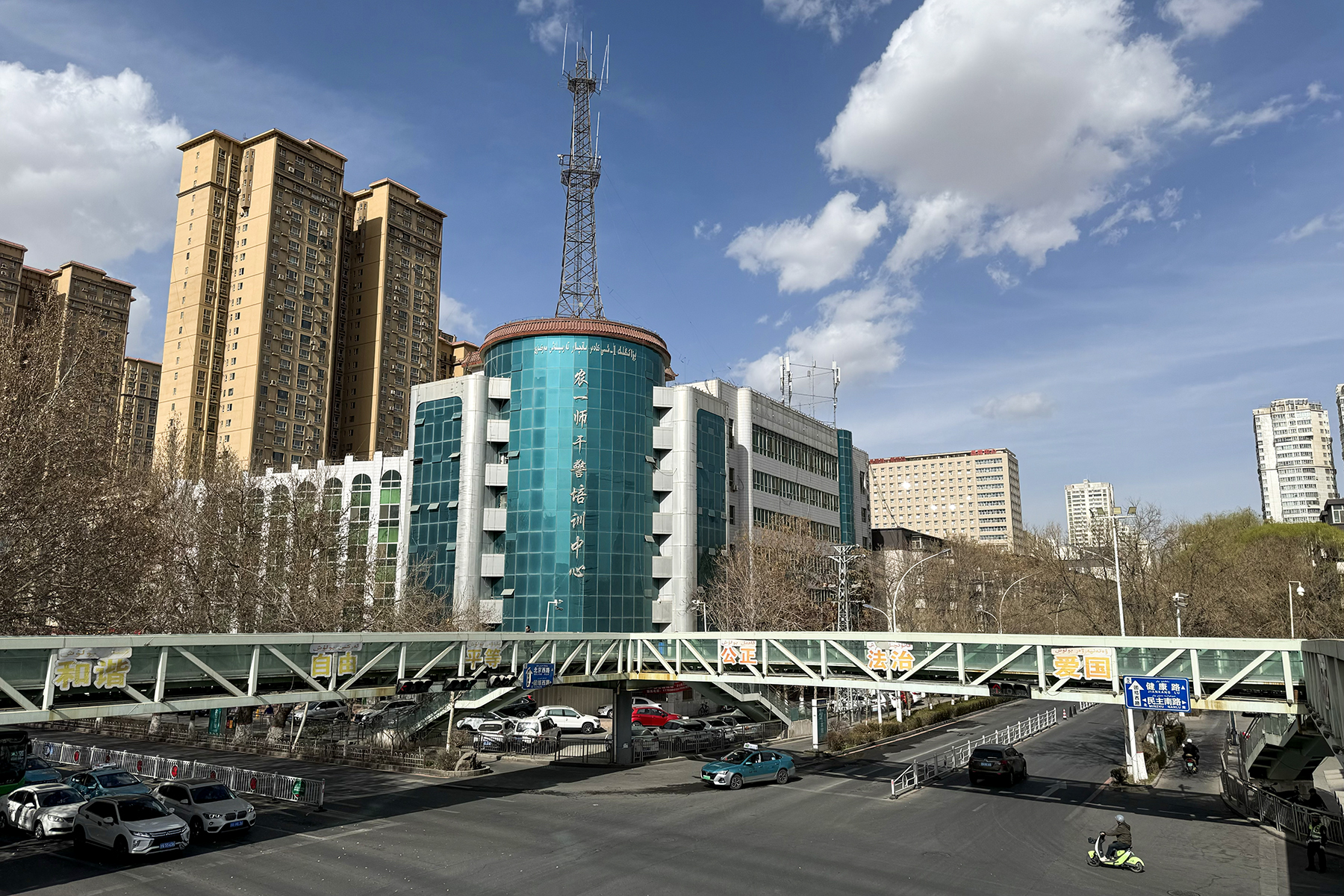
- Tianbai Shopping Center North Xingfu Road Duolang River Century Square Crossing of South Minzhu Road and West Tuanjie Road

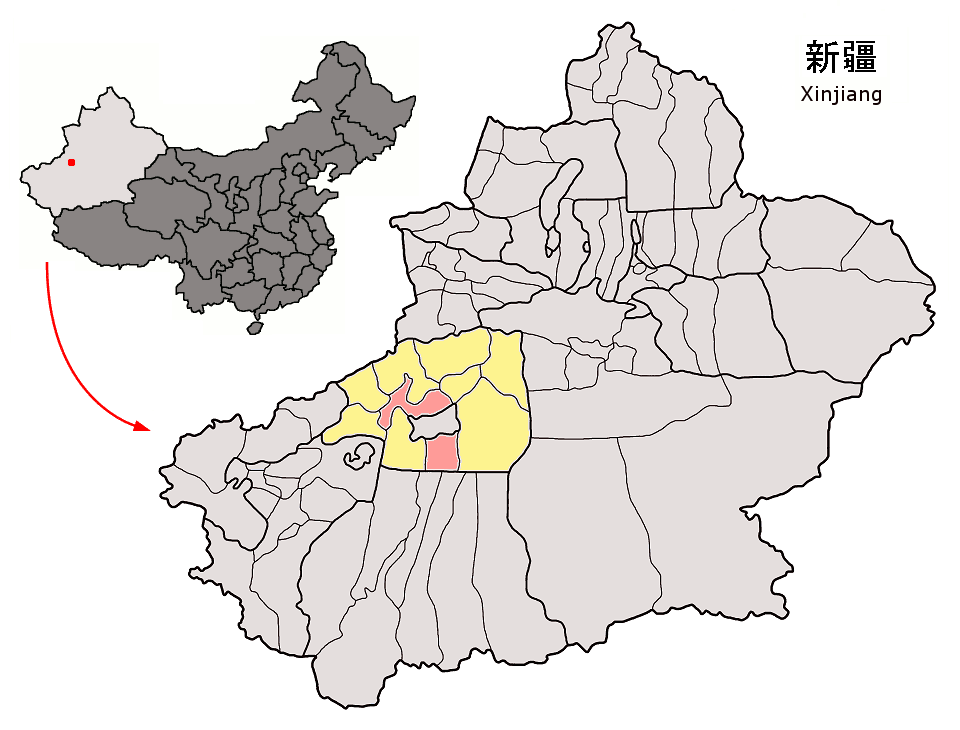
- Location of Aksu City (pink) in Aksu Prefecture and Xinjiang

- Location of the city centre in Xinjiang Location of Aksu in China
- Coordinates (Aksu City government): 41°11′06″N 80°17′25″E
- Country: China
- Autonomous region: Xinjiang
- Prefecture: Aksu
- Municipal seat: Lengger Subdistrict
- Township-level divisions: 7 subdistricts, 2 towns, 4 townships, 5 other areas

Area
  - Total: 14,668 km^{2} (5,663 sq mi)

Population (2020)
  - Total: 695,000
  - Density: 47.4/km^{2} (123/sq mi)

Ethnic groups
  - Major ethnic groups: Uyghurs, Han Chinese
- Time zone: UTC+8 (China Standard (Note: Locals in Xinjiang frequently observe UTC+6 (Xinjiang Time), 2 hours behind Beijing.))
- Postal code: 843000
- Area code: 0997
- GDP (2020): CNY¥25.125 billion US $3.64 billion
- GDP per capita: CNY¥36,151; US $5,239
- Growth: ▲5.8%
- Website: akss.gov.cn (in Chinese)

Aksu City

Uyghur name
- Uyghur: ئاقسۇ
Transcriptions
- Latin Yëziqi: Aqsu
- Yengi Yeziⱪ: Aⱪsu
- SASM/GNC: Aksu
- Siril Yëziqi: Ақсу

Chinese name
- Simplified Chinese: 阿克苏市
- Traditional Chinese: 阿克蘇市
Transcriptions
Standard Mandarin
- Hanyu Pinyin: Ākèsū Shì

Aksu (Uyghur: ئاقسۇ, Aqsu; Chinese: 阿克苏; pinyin: Ākèsū) is a city in and the seat of Aksu Prefecture, Xinjiang, lying at the northern edge of the Tarim Basin. The name Aksu literally means "white water" (in Turkic) and is used for both the oasis town and the Aksu River.

The economy of Aksu is mostly agricultural, with cotton, in particular long-staple cotton (Gossypium hirsutum), as the main product. Also produced are grain, fruits, oils and beets. The industry mostly consists of weaving, cement and chemical industries.

The land currently under the administration of the Aksu City is divided in two parts, separated by the Aral City. The northern part hosts the city center, while the southern part is occupied by the Taklamakan Desert.

== Etymology ==
The name Aksu comes from the name of the Aksu River which is the Uyghur word for "white water". It is transliterated as Akesu in Chinese Pinyin.

== History ==
=== Gumo ===
From the Former Han dynasty (125 BCE to 23 CE) at least until the early Tang dynasty (618–907 CE), Aksu was known as Gumo 姑墨 [Ku-mo]. The ancient capital town of Nan ("Southern Town") was likely well south of the present town.

During the Han dynasty, Gumo is described as a "kingdom" (guo) containing 3,500 households and 24,500 individuals, including 4,500 people able to bear arms. It is said to have produced copper, iron and orpiment. The territory of Gumo was roughly situated in the counties of Baicheng and Wensu and the city of Aksu of nowadays.

=== Baluka ===
During the Buddhist era, it was known as Bharuka, Bohuan and Baluka, Bolujia (in pinyin), Po-lu-chia (in Wade–Giles).

The Chinese pilgrim Xuanzang visited this "kingdom" in 629 CE and referred to it as Baluka. He recorded that there were tens of Sarvastivadin vihāras in the kingdom and over 1000 Buddhist monks. He said the kingdom was 600 li from east to west, and 300 li from north to south. Its capital was said to be six li in circumference. Xuanzang reported that the "native products, climate, temperament of the people, customs, written language and law are the same as in the country of Kuci or modern Kucha", some 300 km or 190 mi to the east, "but the spoken language is somewhat different" from the Kuchean language, which is also known as Tocharian B and West Tocharian. He also stated that fine cotton and hemp cloth made in the area was traded in neighbouring countries. Bharuka was an ancient oasis kingdom recorded in Buddhist Sanskrit geographical traditions. Located along the northern Silk Road in Central Asia, it was linked to India through trade and Buddhist pilgrimage routes. These connections supported the movement of merchants and monks and the transmission of Buddhist texts, teachings and cultural traditions.

=== Contested period ===
In the 7th, 8th, and early 9th centuries, control of the entire region was often contested by Tang China, the Tibetan Empire, and the Uyghur Khaganate; cities frequently changed hands. Tibet seized Aksu in 670, but Tang forces reconquered the region in 692.

The Tang general Tang Jiahui led the Chinese to defeat an Arab-Tibetan attack in the Battle of Aksu (717). The attack on Aksu was joined by Türgesh Khan Suluk. Both Uch Turfan and Aksu were attacked by the Turgesh, Arab, and Tibetan force on 15 August 717. Qarluqs serving under Chinese command, under Arsila Xian, a Western Turkic Qaghan serving under the Chinese Assistant Grand Protector General Tang Jiahui defeated the attack. Al-Yashkuri, the Arab commander and his army fled to Tashkent after they were defeated.

Tibet regained the Tarim Basin in the late 720s, and the Tang dynasty again annexed the region in the 740s. The Battle of Talas led to the gradual withdrawal of Chinese forces, and the region was then contested between the Uyghurs and Tibetans.

Aksu was positioned on a junction of trade routes: the northern Tarim route Silk Road, and the dangerous route north via the Tian Shan's Muzart Pass to the fertile Ili Valley.

=== Mongol era ===
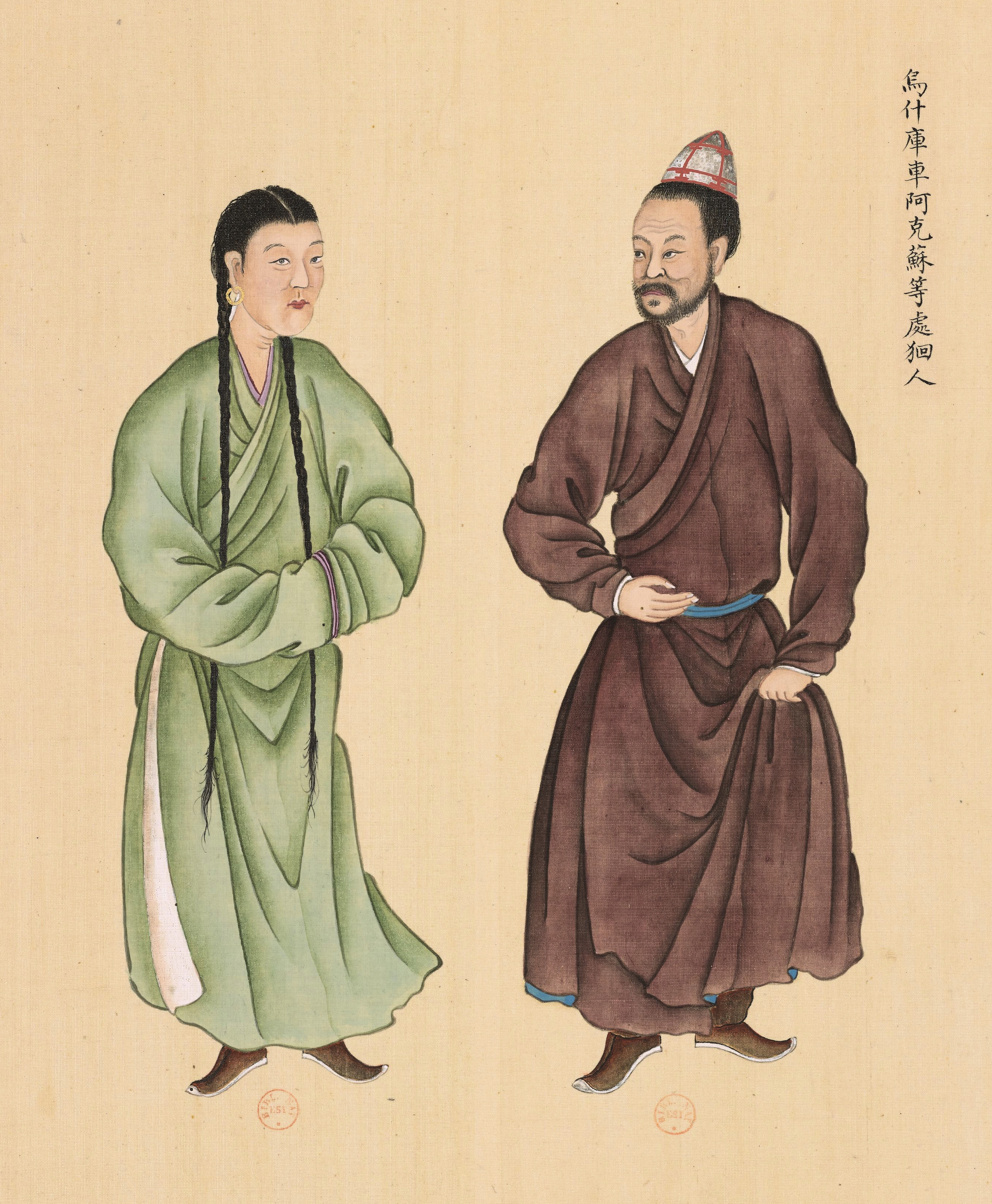
Huang Qing Zhigong Tu, 1769, Uyghur commoners from Wushi, Kucha and Aksu.

In 1207–1208, Aksu submitted to Genghis Khan who founded the Mongol Empire. The area had been part of the whole Mongol Empire before it was occupied by the independent-minded Chagatai Khanate under the House of Ögedei in 1286 from the hands of Kublai's Yuan dynasty. After the decline of the Yuan dynasty and the split of the Chagatai Khanate in the mid-14th century, Aksu became a territory of the khanate of Moghulistan. Later Aksu fell under the power of Turkic and Mongol warlords. Like most of Xinjiang, Aksu fell under the control of the Khojas and the Dzungar Khanate. Along with Kashgar, Asku played an important role in east–west exchange.

=== Qing era ===
The Qing dynasty of China conquered the Dzungar Khanate during the final stage of the Dzungar–Qing Wars in the late 1750s. By 1760, the whole Xinjiang including Aksu became the territory of the Qing dynasty. The Aksu region was given immediate legitimacy by the Qing government, which also gave it the name Wensu Independent Department (溫宿直隸州) and appointed an imperial agent to supervise its activity.

Aksu was seized by Yaqub Beg during the Dungan Revolt of 1864–1877. Yakub Beg seized Aksu from Chinese Muslim forces. After the reconquest of Xinjiang, the Qing dynasty formed Aksu Prefecture as part of the new Xinjiang Province in 1884. After the fall of Yakub Beg, a learned cleric named Musa Sayrami (1836–1917), who had occupied positions of importance in Aksu under both rebel regimes, authored Tārīkh-i amniyya (History of Peace), which is considered by modern historians as one of the most important historical sources on the period.

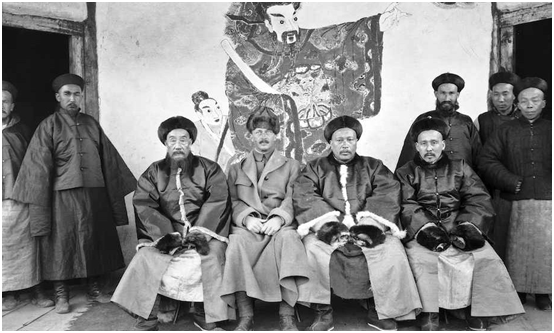
Baron C. G. E. Mannerheim (in the middle) in Aksu, 1907

British Army officer Francis Younghusband visited Aksu in 1887 on his overland journey from Beijing to British India. He described it as being the largest town he had seen on his way from the Chinese capital, with a population of about 20,000, besides other inhabitants of the district and a garrison of about 2,000 soldiers. "There were large bazaars and several inns—some for travellers, others for merchants wishing to make a prolonged stay to sell goods."

=== Modern era ===
After the fall of the Qing dynasty, Aksu County (阿克蘇縣) was established by the Republic of China in 1913.

The Battle of Aksu occurred here on 31 May 1933. Isma'il Beg, a Uighur, became the rebel Tao-yin of Aksu. After the outbreak of the Ili Rebellion, the Ili National Army forces led by Abdulkerim Abbas attempting to take Aksu were repelled by National Revolutionary Army defenders commanded by Zhao Hanqi after two bitter sieges in September 1945.

On 19 August 1983, Aksu County became Aksu City (阿克苏市). The city government began operation on 7 May 1984. Aksu was the site of a bombing in 2010. On 23 January 2013, 802.733 km^{2} (309.937 mi^{2}) of territory was transferred from Aksu city to Aral city.

=== Timeline ===
- Before 600 the region was under control of Huns and Uyghur Turkic tribes.
- 630: Xuanzang visited the kingdom.
- 800: Uyghur Khaganate
- 1000: Kara-Khanid Khanate
- 1250: Chagatai Khanate
- 1350: Moghulistan
- 1500: Yarkent Khanate

== Geography ==
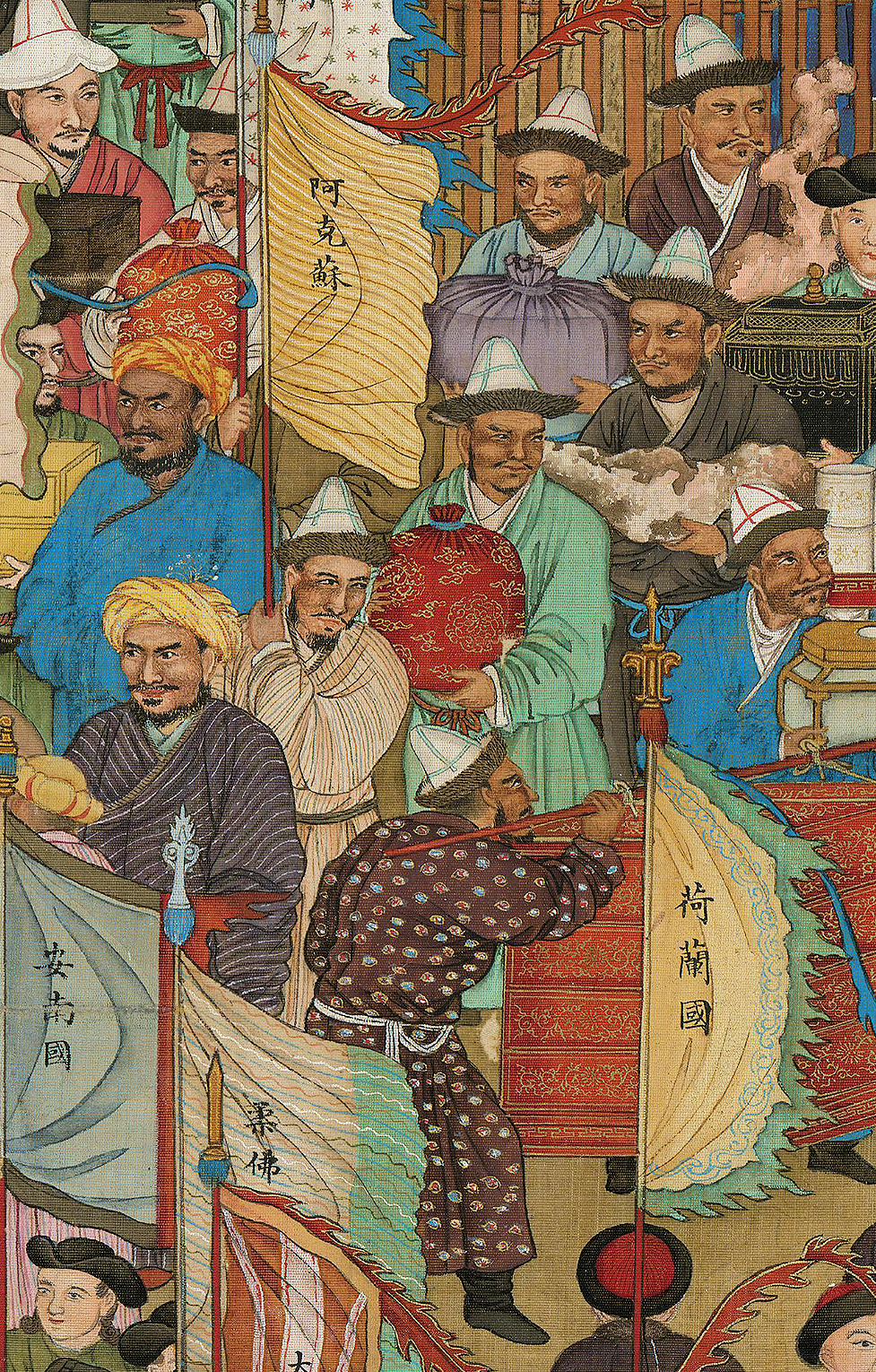
Aksu (阿克蘇) delegates in Beijing, China, in 1761. 万国来朝图

Aksu City is divided into two non-contiguous areas. The northern area is inhabited and the southern area is in the Taklamakan Desert. The southern area ends at a strait line in the desert along the 39°28′57″N parallel that divides it from Lop County (Luopu) and Qira County (Cele) in Hotan Prefecture (Hetian).

=== Neighbours ===
The kingdom bordered Kashgar to the south-west, and Kucha, Karasahr then Turpan to the east. Across the desert to the south was Khotan.

=== Climate ===
Aksu has a cold desert climate (Köppen climate classification BWk) with extreme seasonal variation in temperature. The monthly 24-hour average temperature ranges from −7.2 °C (19.0 °F) in January to 24.1 °C (75.4 °F), and the annual mean is 10.8 °C (51.4 °F). Precipitation totals only 80.6 mm (3.17 in) annually, and mostly falls in summer, as compared to an annual evaporation rate of about 1,200 to 1,500 mm (47 to 59 in); there are about 2,800–3,000 hours of bright sunshine annually. The frost-free period averages 200–220 days.

Climate data for Aksu, elevation 1,107 m (3,632 ft), (1991–2020 normals, extremes 1971–present)
| Month | Jan | Feb | Mar | Apr | May | Jun | Jul | Aug | Sep | Oct | Nov | Dec | Year |
|---|---|---|---|---|---|---|---|---|---|---|---|---|---|
| Record high °C (°F) | 8.8 (47.8) | 14.4 (57.9) | 27.9 (82.2) | 34.5 (94.1) | 36.0 (96.8) | 37.4 (99.3) | 39.6 (103.3) | 38.6 (101.5) | 36.5 (97.7) | 29.4 (84.9) | 22.4 (72.3) | 9.8 (49.6) | 39.6 (103.3) |
| Mean daily maximum °C (°F) | −1.0 (30.2) | 5.4 (41.7) | 14.4 (57.9) | 22.8 (73.0) | 27.3 (81.1) | 30.6 (87.1) | 32.0 (89.6) | 30.8 (87.4) | 26.6 (79.9) | 19.7 (67.5) | 9.8 (49.6) | 0.7 (33.3) | 18.3 (64.9) |
| Daily mean °C (°F) | −7.4 (18.7) | −0.9 (30.4) | 8.0 (46.4) | 15.9 (60.6) | 20.2 (68.4) | 23.3 (73.9) | 24.7 (76.5) | 23.5 (74.3) | 19.0 (66.2) | 11.6 (52.9) | 2.9 (37.2) | −5.0 (23.0) | 11.3 (52.4) |
| Mean daily minimum °C (°F) | −12.4 (9.7) | −6.1 (21.0) | 2.1 (35.8) | 9.3 (48.7) | 13.5 (56.3) | 16.4 (61.5) | 17.9 (64.2) | 17.0 (62.6) | 12.5 (54.5) | 5.2 (41.4) | −2.0 (28.4) | −9.1 (15.6) | 5.4 (41.6) |
| Record low °C (°F) | −25.2 (−13.4) | −24.4 (−11.9) | −10.9 (12.4) | −3.1 (26.4) | 2.7 (36.9) | 6.0 (42.8) | 8.7 (47.7) | 8.3 (46.9) | 1.4 (34.5) | −4.5 (23.9) | −12.9 (8.8) | −23.4 (−10.1) | −25.2 (−13.4) |
| Average precipitation mm (inches) | 2.2 (0.09) | 3.1 (0.12) | 3.7 (0.15) | 4.1 (0.16) | 10.2 (0.40) | 19.7 (0.78) | 15.1 (0.59) | 13.5 (0.53) | 10.0 (0.39) | 4.4 (0.17) | 2.4 (0.09) | 3.5 (0.14) | 91.9 (3.61) |
| Average precipitation days (≥ 0.1 mm) | 3.3 | 2.2 | 1.3 | 1.7 | 3.6 | 6.4 | 6.9 | 6.2 | 3.9 | 1.2 | 1.2 | 3.2 | 41.1 |
| Average snowy days | 5.8 | 3.1 | 0.8 | 0 | 0 | 0 | 0 | 0 | 0 | 0.1 | 1.3 | 5.8 | 16.9 |
| Average relative humidity (%) | 70 | 59 | 45 | 38 | 41 | 46 | 50 | 54 | 57 | 58 | 65 | 74 | 55 |
| Mean monthly sunshine hours | 182.3 | 184.9 | 208.9 | 240.2 | 278.0 | 292.3 | 309.9 | 286.7 | 263.0 | 256.2 | 197.4 | 158.2 | 2,858 |
| Percentage possible sunshine | 61 | 61 | 56 | 59 | 61 | 65 | 68 | 68 | 72 | 76 | 68 | 56 | 64 |
Source 1: China Meteorological Administration all-time September high
Source 2: Weather China

== Administrative divisions ==
Aksu City included 7 subdistricts, 3 towns, 3 townships and five other areas:

| Name | Simplified Chinese | Hanyu Pinyin | Uyghur (UEY) | Uyghur Latin (ULY) | Administrative division code |
|---|---|---|---|---|---|
Subdistricts
| Lengger Subdistrict | 兰干街道 | Lángàn Jiēdào | لەڭگەر كوچا باشقارمىسى | lengger kocha bashqarmisi | 652901001 |
| Yengibazar Subdistrict | 英巴扎街道 | Yīngbāzhā Jiēdào | يېڭىبازار كوچا باشقارمىسى | yëngibazar kocha bashqarmisi | 652901002 |
| Qizil Kowruk Subdistrict (Hongqiao Subdistrict) | 红桥街道 | Hóngqiáo Jiēdào | قىزىل كۆۋرۈك كوچا باشقارمىسى | qizil köwrük kocha bashqarmisi | 652901003 |
| Yengisheher Subdistrict (Xincheng Subdistrict) | 新城街道 | Xīnchéng Jiēdào | يېڭىشەھەر كوچا باشقارمىسى | yëngisheher kocha bashqarmisi | 652901004 |
| Nancheng Subdistrict | 南城街道 | Nánchéng Jiēdào | جەنۇبىي شەھەر كوچا باشقارمىسى | jenubiy sheher kocha bashqarmisi | 652901005 |
| Kokyar Subdistrict | 柯柯牙街道 | Kēkēyá Jiēdào | كۆكيار كوچا باشقارمىسى | kökyar kocha bashqarmisi | 652901006 |
| Dolan Subdistrict | 多浪街道 | Duōlàng Jiēdào | دولان كوچا باشقارمىسى | dolan kocha bashqarmisi | 652901007 |
Towns
| Qaratal Town (Kara Tal) | 喀拉塔勒镇 | Kālātǎlè Zhèn | قاراتال بازىرى | qaratal baziri | 652901100 |
| Aykol Town | 阿依库勒镇 | Āyīkùlè Zhèn | ئايكۆل بازىرى | Ayköl baziri | 652901101 |
| Egerchi Town (Igerchi) | 依干其镇 | Yīgànqí Zhèn | ئېگەرچى بازىرى | Ëgerchi baziri | 652901102 |
Townships
| Bextügman Township | 拜什吐格曼乡 | Bàishítǔgémàn Xiāng | بەشتۈگمەن يېزىسى | beshtügmen yëzisi | 652901201 |
| Topluq Township | 托普鲁克乡 | Tuōpǔlǔkè Xiāng | توپلۇق يېزىسى | topluq yëzisi | 652901202 |
| Qumbash Township | 库木巴什乡 | Kùmùbāshí Xiāng | قۇمباش يېزىسى | qumbash yëzisi | 652901203 |

== Demographics ==
Historical population
| Year | Pop. | ±% p.a. |
|---|---|---|
| 2000 | 561,822 | — |
| 2010 | 535,657 | −0.48% |
| 2015 | 513,682 | −0.83% |

Although the Tarim Basin is largely dominated by the Uyghurs, there are many Han Chinese in Aksu due to the presence of bingtuan state farms here. The Chinese government had encouraged migration to Xinjiang from the late 1950s and early 1960s onwards, and by 1998, Han Chinese formed the majority in the urban area of Aksu. In 2015, 44.67% of the population was Han Chinese.

As of 1999, 57.89% of the population of Aksu City was Han Chinese and 40.75% of the population was Uyghur. In the 2000 census, a figure of 561,822 was recorded for the city's population. In the 2010 census figure, the population in the city of Aksu dropped slightly to 535,657. The difference may be partly due to boundary changes.

As of 2015, 278,210 (54.16%) of the 513,682 residents of the city were Uyghur, 226,781 (44.14%) were Han Chinese and 8,691 were from other ethnic groups.

== Economy ==
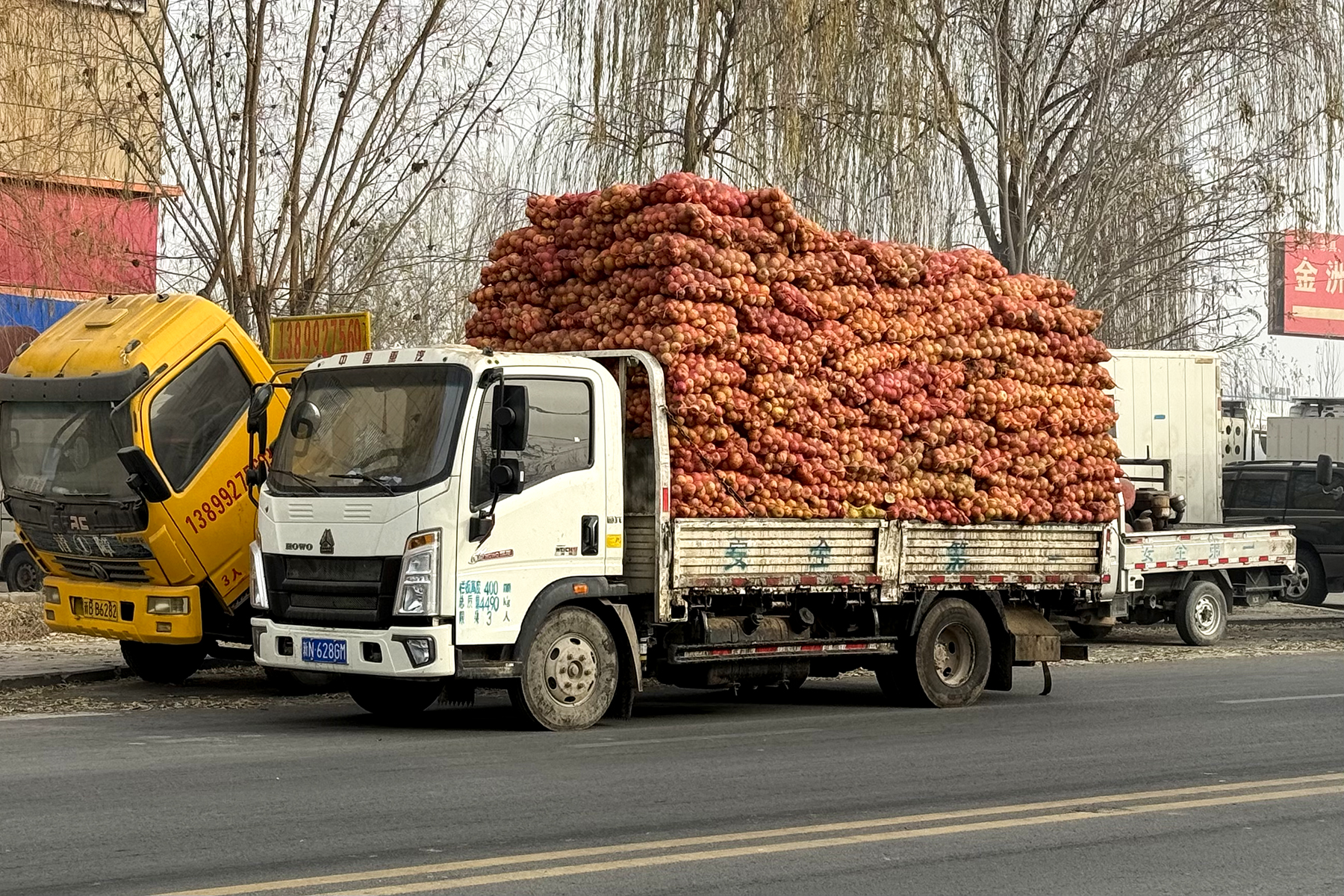
Truck carrying apples in Aksu in 2023

Industries in the city include textiles, construction, chemicals and others. Agricultural products include rice, wheat, corn and cotton. The local speciality is apple and thin-shelled walnuts.

== Transportation ==
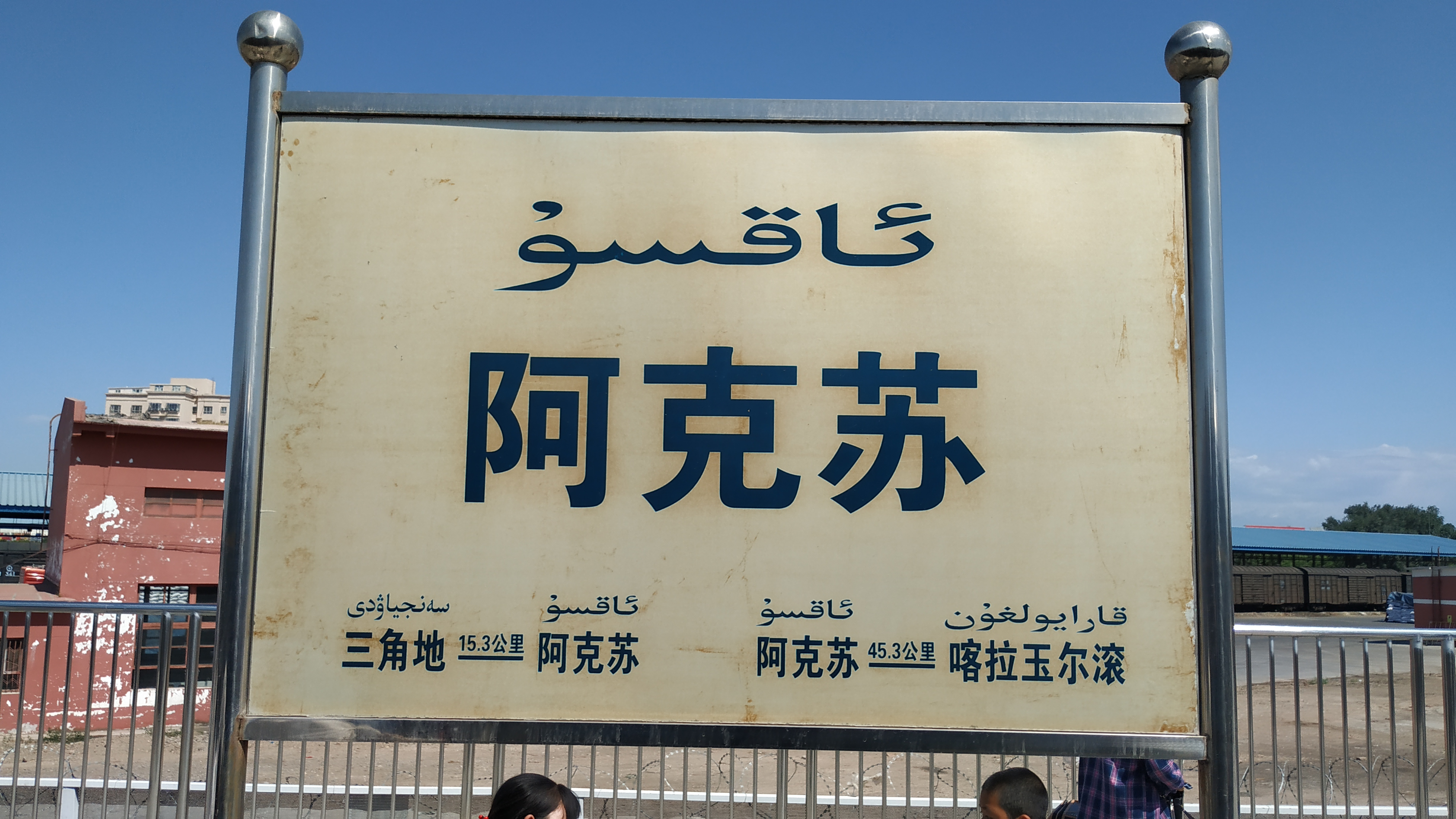
Aksu railway station

Aksu is situated between Ürümqi and Kashgar, with crucial transportation corridors between southern and northern Xinjiang going through the city, such as China National Highway 217, China National Highway 314, and G3012 Turpan–Hotan Expressway. The city is also a significnat stop on the Southern Xinjiang Railway.

Akesu Hongqipo Airport is considered a military airport in China (although also available for civil usage). Only aircraft registered in China can land in Aksu. This means if you are flying to Aksu from international origins you have to land in a major airport in China like Beijing, Shanghai, Guangzhou and change to China registered aircraft which tail number starts with B.

== Tourism ==
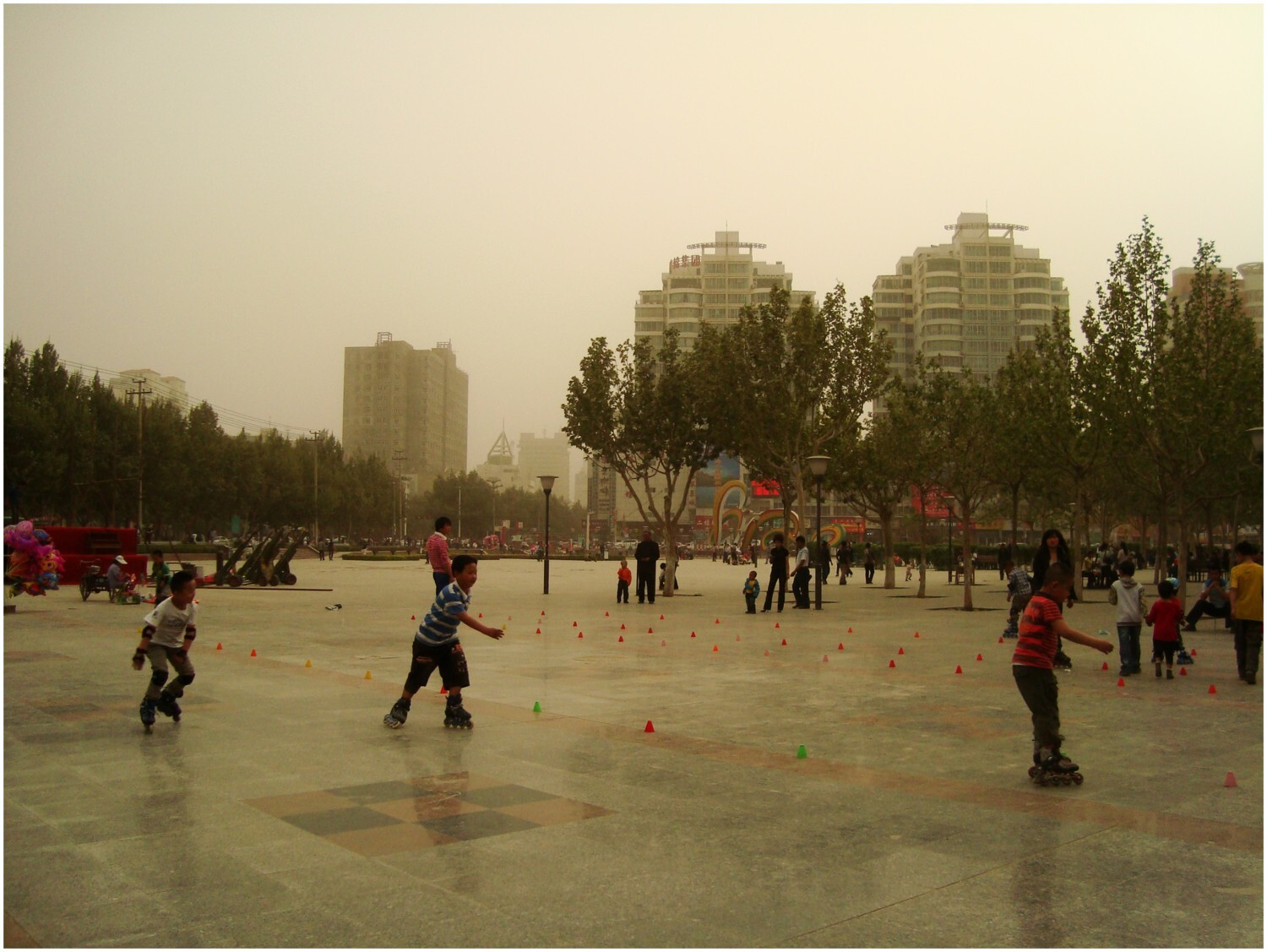
Century Square, Aksu, during a sandstorm

Aksu, formerly the territory of Kucha (Chinese: 龟兹), or Gumo, served as a significant station on the historic Silk Road, with various points of interest along the route. Jengish Chokusu, recognized as the foremost peak of Tianshan Mountains, the enigmatic Grand Canyon, Tianshan Shenmu Garden, Yanshuigou Yardang Landscape, Taklamakan Desert, the primordial Tugay forest along the Tarim River, the largest inland river in China, and the Kizil Thousand Buddha Caves, one of China's four major grottoes. Aksu was designated a National Excellent Tourist City in 2006.

== Historical maps ==
Historical English-language maps including Aksu:

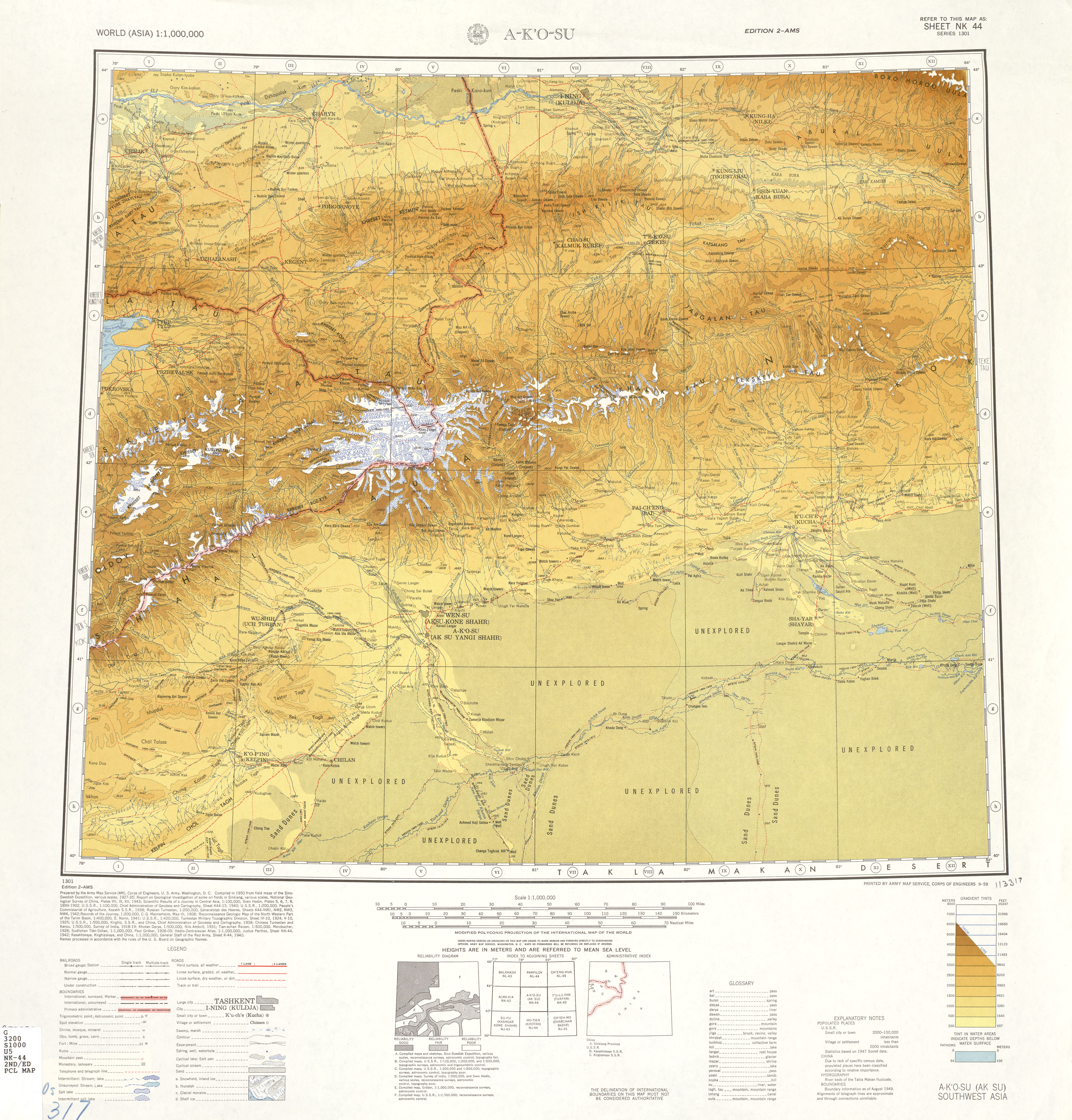
Map of Aksu (labeled as A-K'O-SU (AK SU YANGI SHAHR)) and surrounding region from the International Map of the World (AMS, 1950) (Note: From map: "THE DELINEATION OF INTERNATIONAL BOUNDARIES ON THIS MAP MUST NOT BE CONSIDERED AUTHORITATIVE")

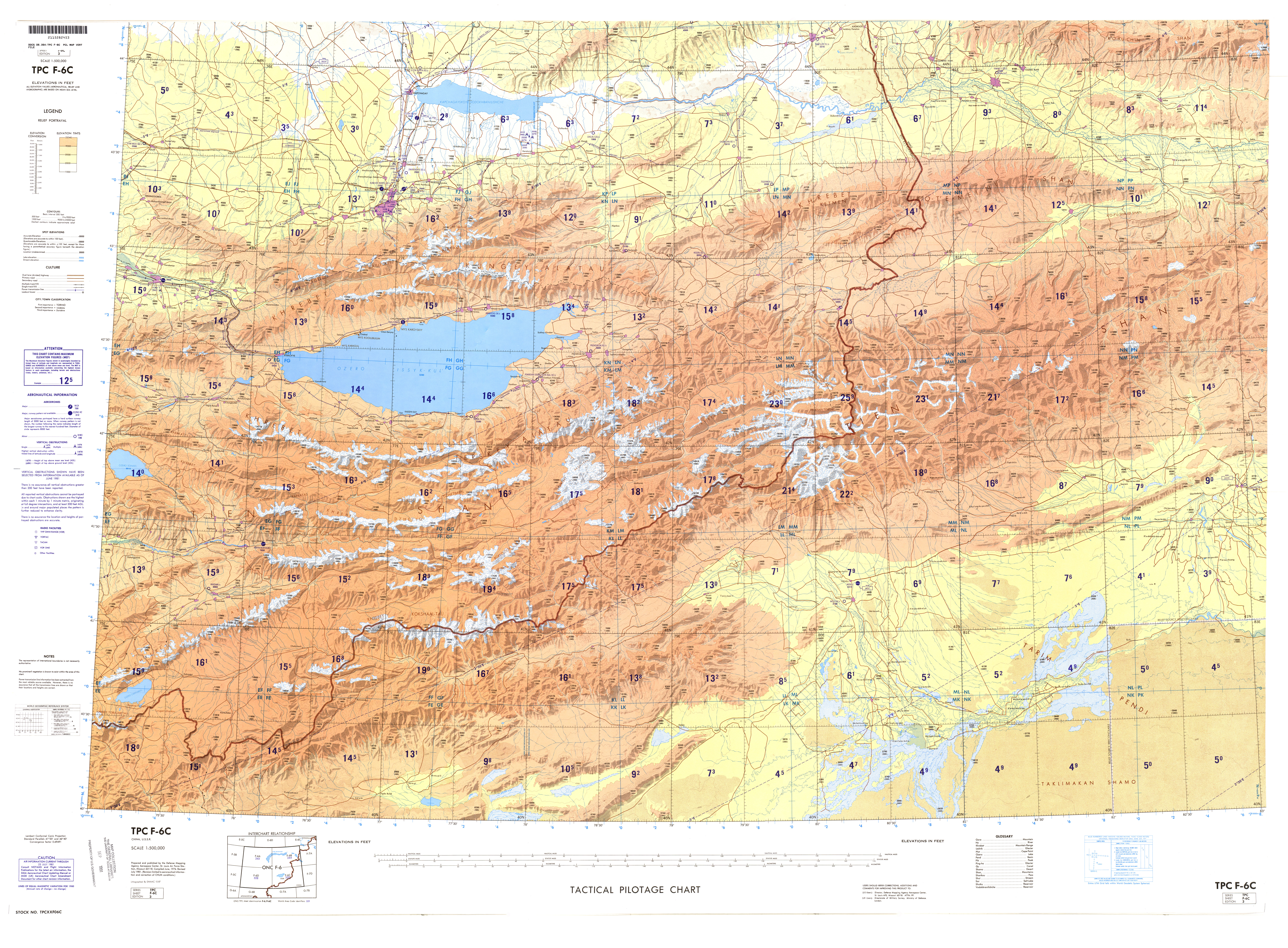
Map including Aksu (DMA, 1981)

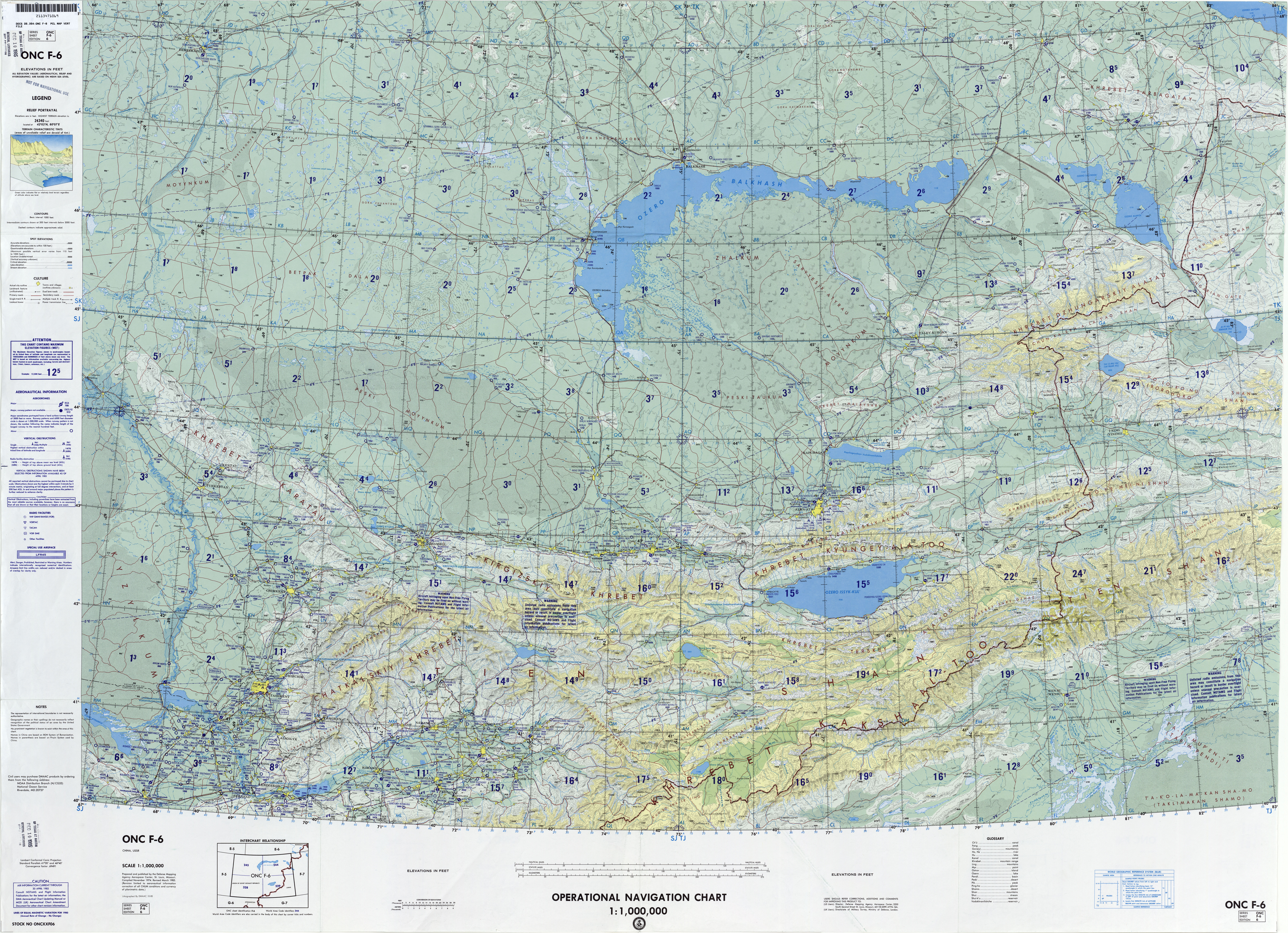
From the Operational Navigation Chart; map including Aksu (A-k'o-su) (DMA, 1985) (Note: From map: "The representation of international boundaries is not necessarily authoritative.")

== See also ==
- Silk Road transmission of Buddhism
