= Muzat River =

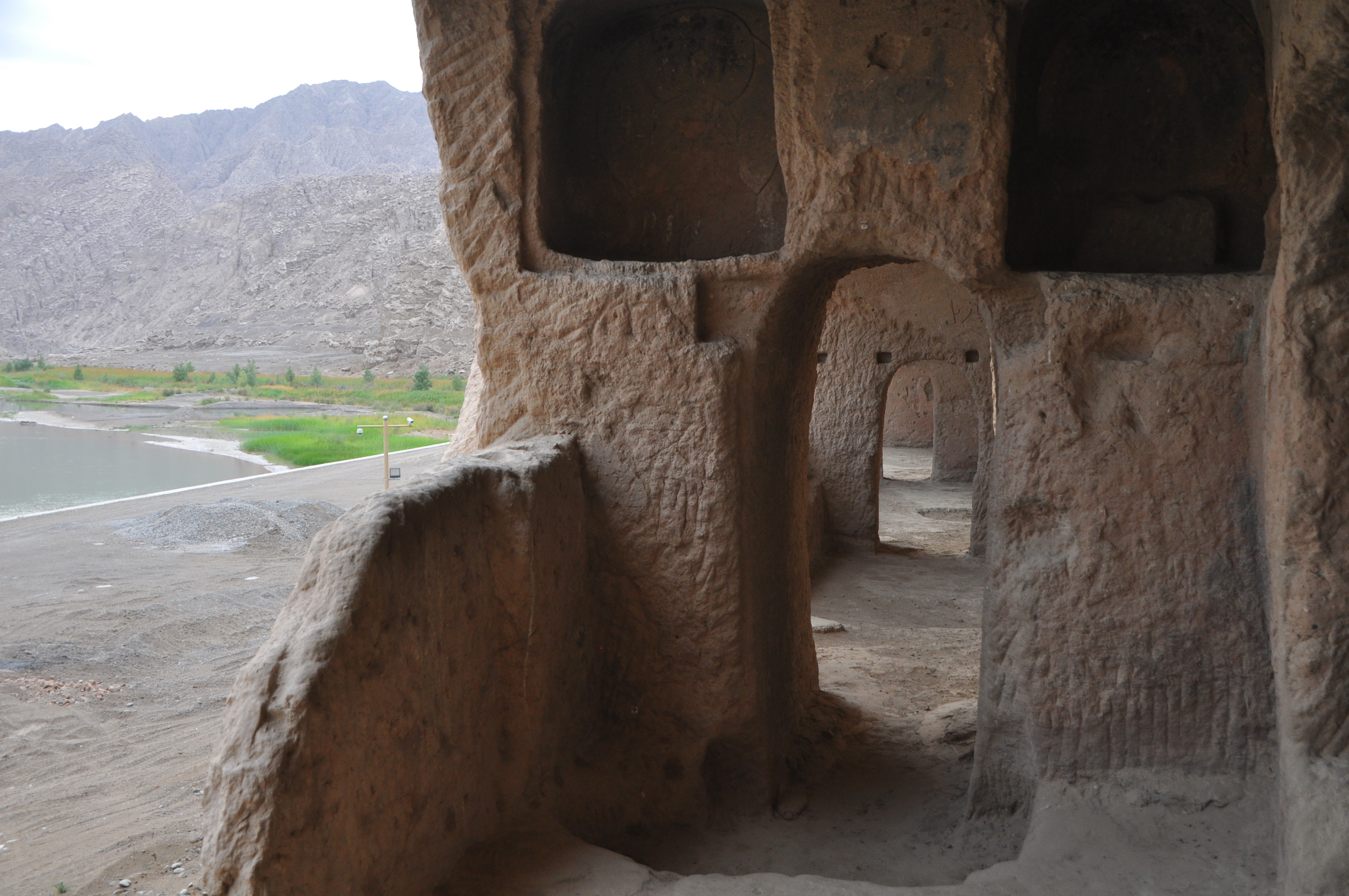

- Location of mouth

Location
- Country: China
- Province: Xinjiang Uyghur Autonomous Region

The Muzart River (Chinese: 木扎尔特河) or Muzat River (Chinese: 木扎提河; Uyghur: مۇزات دەرياسى, romanized: Muzat Deryasi) is a river in Aksu Prefecture of Xinjiang Uyghur Autonomous Region, People's Republic of China, a left tributary of the Tarim River. An early 20th-century source also gives an alternative name for this river, Shāh-Yār-Daryā. Shāh-Yār-Daryā (شاه‌یاردریا) is a Persian word meaning 'The King's aide River.'

The Muzart River starts in the Muzart Glacier (木扎尔特冰川) in the Tian Shan Mountains, not too far from the Khan Tengri Peak, and flows toward the southeast and east through Baicheng County, in the valley between the main range of the Tian Shan and the Queletage Mountains (却勒塔格山) to the south. Most of Baicheng County's population lives in the valley irrigated by this river.

As the river flows east, toward Kucha, it crosses the Queletage Range in a steep valley. Cut into the northern walls of the valley are 230 caves and grottos, forming the Kizil Caves archaeological site.

The river has been dammed at 41°44′45″N 82°26′40″E, a short distance upstream of the Kizil site, forming a large man-made lake known as the Kizil Reservoir (simplified Chinese: 克孜尔水库; traditional Chinese: 克孜爾水庫; pinyin: Kèzī'ěr shuǐkù). With the surface area of 50,000 m², the reservoir has been described as "the largest swimming pool" in southern Xinjiang. However, its construction may have destroyed the possibility of future archaeological excavations for the area.

Farther east the river enters a wide plain, where most of its water is taken into irrigation channels supporting the agriculture of the Kuqa, Toksu, and Xayar Counties. Theoretically, the Muzart River is considered a left tributary of the Tarim River, but in practice its waters flow all the way to the Tarim only during the spring-summer flood season.

== See also ==
- Muzart Pass
