= Engilchek (river) =

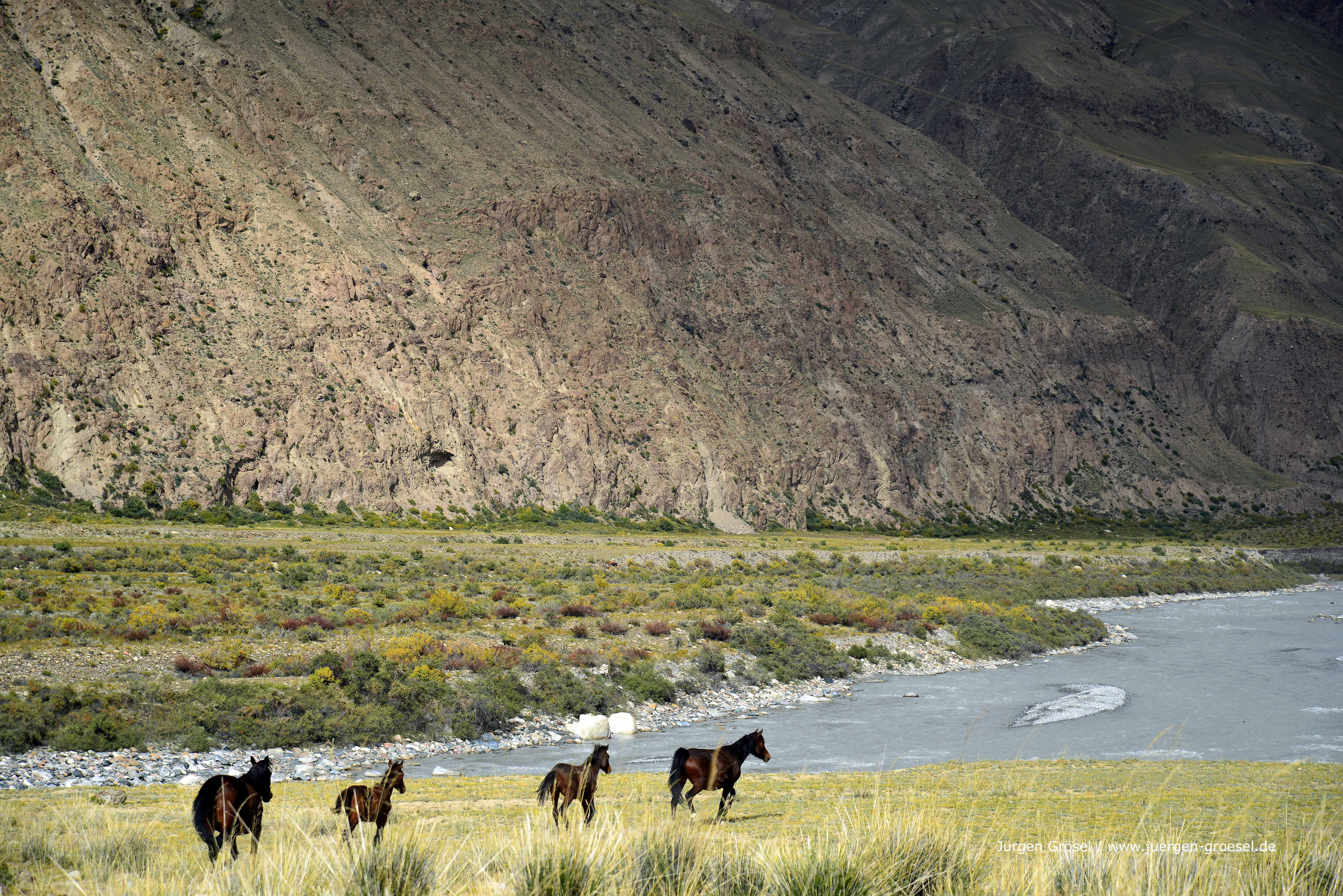
- Native name: Эңилчек (Kyrgyz)

Location
- Country: Kyrgyzstan
- Region: Issyk-Kul Region
- District: Ak-Suu District

Physical characteristics
- Mouth: Saryjaz
  - coordinates: 42°01′56″N 79°04′02″E
- Length: 62 km (39 mi)
- Basin size: 1,739 km^{2} (671 sq mi)
- Discharge
  - average: 30.0 m^{3}/s (1,060 cu ft/s)

Basin features
- Progression: Saryjaz→ Tarim→ Taitema Lake

The Engilchek (Kyrgyz: Эңилчек) is a river in Ak-Suu District of Issyk-Kul Region of eastern Kyrgyzstan. It drains the Engilchek Glacier in the Central Tian Shan Mountains. It is a left tributary of the river Saryjaz (Aksu in China). It is 62 kilometres (39 mi) long, has a drainage basin of 1,739 square kilometres (671 sq mi), and its annual average flow rate is 30.0 m^{3}/s (1,060 cu ft/s). The only populated place on its banks is the mining village Engilchek, near its confluence with the Saryjaz.
