= Baicheng County =

Baicheng County باي ناھىيىسى (Uyghur) 拜城县 (Chinese) Bay, Bai, Paicheng
- County
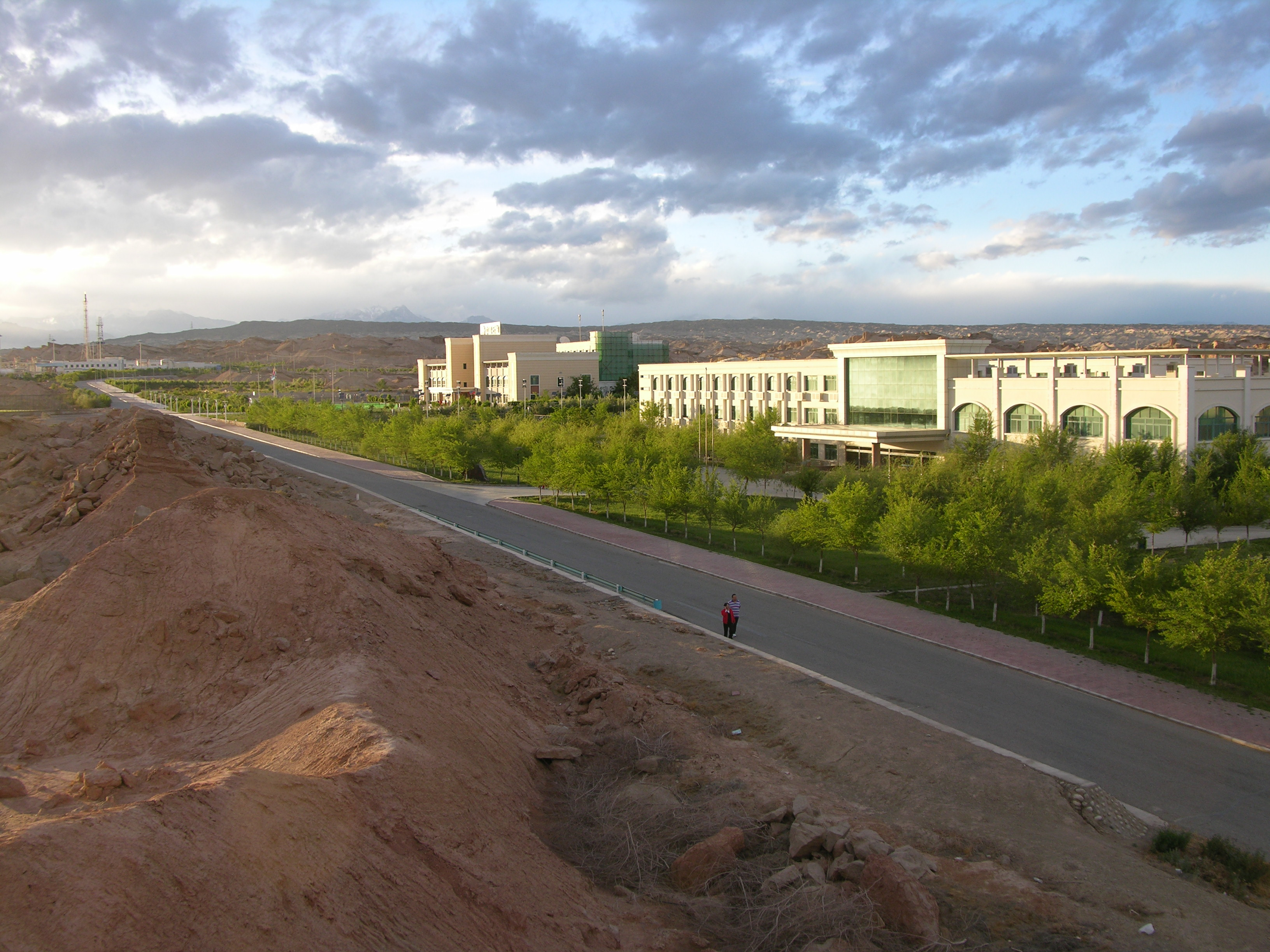

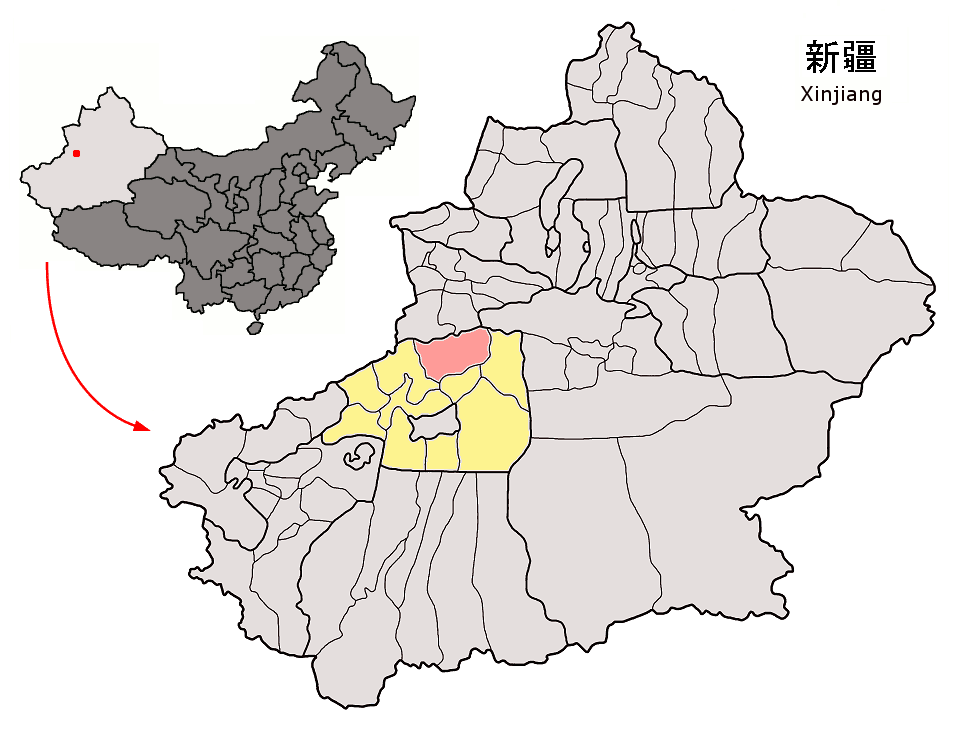
- Location of Baicheng County (red) in Aksu Prefecture (yellow) and Xinjiang

- Location within China Baicheng County (China)
- Coordinates: 41°46′12″N 81°52′12″E
- Country: China
- Autonomous region: Xinjiang
- Prefecture: Aksu
- County seat: Bai Town
- Township-level divisions: 4 towns, 10 townships

Area
  - Total: 15,916.81 km^{2} (6,145.51 sq mi)

Population (2020)
  - Total: 231,113
  - Density: 14.5201/km^{2} (37.6068/sq mi)

Ethnic groups
  - Major ethnic groups: Uyghur
- Time zone: UTC+8 (China Standard (Note: Locals in Xinjiang frequently observe UTC+6 (Xinjiang Time), 2 hours behind Beijing.))
- Postal code: 842300
- Website: www.xjbc.gov.cn (in Chinese)

Baicheng County

Uyghur name
- Uyghur: باي ناھىيىسى
Transcriptions
- Latin Yëziqi: Bay Nahiyisi
- Yengi Yeziⱪ: Bay Naⱨiyisi
- SASM/GNC: Bay Nahiyisi
- Siril Yëziqi: Бай Наһийиси

Chinese name
- Simplified Chinese: 拜城县
- Traditional Chinese: 拜城縣
Transcriptions
Standard Mandarin
- Hanyu Pinyin: Bàichéng Xiàn

Alternative Chinese name
- Simplified Chinese: 拜县
- Traditional Chinese: 拜縣
Transcriptions
Standard Mandarin
- Hanyu Pinyin: Bài Xiàn

Baicheng County (Chinese: 拜城县) as the official romanized name, also transliterated from Uyghur as Bay County (pronounced like 'bye',, Uyghur: باي ناھىيىسى; Chinese: 拜县), is a county in Aksu Prefecture of the Xinjiang Uyghur Autonomous Region, China.

== History ==
In 1882, the county was established.

On 6 November 1997, a member of a Xinjiang separatist group, Muhammat Tursun, fatally shot imam Yunus Sidiq Damolla at his mosque in Baicheng County.

According to a report from Radio Free Asia, on February 17, 2015, seventeen Uyghurs (four policemen, nine attackers and four bystanders) were killed after a stabbing incident 150 m (490 ft) from a police station in the county.

On September 18, 2015, a group of terrorists, suspected to be Uyghurs, attacked workers and security guards at the Sogan Colliery in Terek, leaving at up to 50 dead and 50 wounded. A manhunt for the suspects concluded on November 13, with 28 suspects killed and 1 surrendering. In interview with Radio Free Asia, county police officers confirmed that women and children were among those killed in November.

On December 5, 2019 at around 10:46 a.m., a 4.9 magnitude earthquake struck the county (epicenter: 41.73°N 81.65°E).

== Geography ==
The county is located in the northern part of the prefecture, occupying the valley of the Muzart River between the southern slopes of the Tengritagh and the Qoltagh (却勒塔格山; Quèlètǎgé Shān).

== Climate ==
Climate data for Baicheng, elevation 1,229 m (4,032 ft), (1991–2020 normals, extremes 1991–present)
Month	Jan	Feb	Mar	Apr	May	Jun	Jul	Aug	Sep	Oct	Nov	Dec	Year
Record high °C (°F)	5.6 (42.1)	16.8 (62.2)	25.3 (77.5)	33.6 (92.5)	34.2 (93.6)	36.2 (97.2)	39.0 (102.2)	37.7 (99.9)	36.0 (96.8)	28.3 (82.9)	19.2 (66.6)	7.3 (45.1)	39.0 (102.2)
Mean daily maximum °C (°F)	−4.3 (24.3)	2.7 (36.9)	12.9 (55.2)	21.3 (70.3)	25.8 (78.4)	29.1 (84.4)	30.8 (87.4)	29.9 (85.8)	25.4 (77.7)	18.1 (64.6)	7.5 (45.5)	−2.3 (27.9)	16.4 (61.5)
Daily mean °C (°F)	−11.3 (11.7)	−4.5 (23.9)	5.4 (41.7)	13.4 (56.1)	17.8 (64.0)	20.7 (69.3)	22.1 (71.8)	21.1 (70.0)	16.5 (61.7)	8.6 (47.5)	0.1 (32.2)	−8.2 (17.2)	8.5 (47.3)
Mean daily minimum °C (°F)	−16.6 (2.1)	−10.3 (13.5)	−1.1 (30.0)	6.0 (42.8)	10.4 (50.7)	13.1 (55.6)	14.9 (58.8)	14.0 (57.2)	9.7 (49.5)	1.9 (35.4)	−4.7 (23.5)	−12.2 (10.0)	2.1 (35.8)
Record low °C (°F)	−28.7 (−19.7)	−28.1 (−18.6)	−9.6 (14.7)	−5.0 (23.0)	−0.2 (31.6)	4.9 (40.8)	8.3 (46.9)	7.3 (45.1)	0.8 (33.4)	−5.7 (21.7)	−18.8 (−1.8)	−25.0 (−13.0)	−28.7 (−19.7)
Average precipitation mm (inches)	3.3 (0.13)	4.9 (0.19)	4.8 (0.19)	7.5 (0.30)	13.4 (0.53)	23.9 (0.94)	22.1 (0.87)	22.5 (0.89)	16.7 (0.66)	11.1 (0.44)	5.0 (0.20)	2.5 (0.10)	137.7 (5.44)
Average precipitation days (≥ 0.1 mm)	5.3	3.2	2.5	3.0	5.4	9.1	10.4	9.1	6.8	2.8	2.1	4.0	63.7
Average snowy days	8.9	5.5	1.6	0.2	0	0	0	0	0	0.2	2.5	8.1	27
Average relative humidity (%)	76	71	56	45	48	56	60	62	66	68	76	80	64
Mean monthly sunshine hours	184.4	200.5	240.1	258.9	294.1	295.7	308.2	291.5	266.3	254.3	200.4	161.0	2,955.4
Percentage possible sunshine	62	66	64	64	65	65	68	69	73	76	69	57	67
Source: China Meteorological Administrationall-time September high

== Administrative divisions ==
Baicheng County administered 4 towns and 10 townships

Name	Simplified Chinese	Hanyu Pinyin	Uyghur (UEY)	Uyghur Latin (ULY)	Administrative division code	Notes
Towns
Bai Town	拜城镇	Bàichéng Zhèn	باي بازىرى	bay baziri	652926100	
Tirek Town	铁热克镇	Tiěrèkè Zhèn	تېرەك بازىرى	tërek baziri	652926101	
Qarqi Town (Yaqeriq)	察尔齐镇	Chá'ěrqí Zhèn	ياقىئېرىق بازىرى	yaqi'ëriq baziri	652926102	
Sayram Town	赛里木镇	Sàilǐmù Zhèn	سايرام بازىرى	sayram baziri	652926103	birthplace of the historian Musa Sayrami
Townships
Qeyir Township	黑英山乡	Hēiyīngshān Xiāng	قېيىر يېزىسى	qëyir yëzisi	652926200	
Kizil Township	克孜尔乡	Kèzī'ěr Xiāng	قىزىل يېزىسى	qizil yëzisi	652926201	site of a number of Buddhist grotto sites, including Kizil Caves
Toqsun Township	托克逊乡	Tuōkèxùn Xiāng	توقسۇن يېزىسى	toqsun yëzisi	652926203	
Yatur Township	亚吐尔乡	Yàtǔ'ěr Xiāng	ياتۇر يېزىسى	yatur yëzisi	652926204	
Kanchi Township	康其乡	Kāngqí Xiāng	كانچى يېزىسى	kanchi yëzisi	652926205	
Bulung Township	布隆乡	Bùlóng Xiāng	بۇلۇڭ يېزىسى	bulung yëzisi	652926206	
Miqigh Township	米吉克乡	Mǐjíkè Xiāng	مىچىغ يېزىسى	michigh yëzisi	652926207	
Onbash Township	温巴什乡	Wēnbāshí Xiāng	ئومباش يېزىسى	Ombash yëzisi	652926208	
Chong Kowruk Township	大桥乡	Dàqiáo Xiāng	چوڭ كۆۋرۈك يېزىسى	chong köwrük yëzisi	652926209	
Qarabagh Township	老虎台乡	Láohǔtái Xiāng	قاراباغ يېزىسى	qarabagh yëzisi	652926210	

== Economy ==
The county's economy is based on agriculture and produces rapeseed in abundance. Animal husbandry is also common. Mineral resources are rich. Industries include coal, iron, electronics, fertilizer, tractors, vegetable oil extraction, etc. The Tianshan Mountains have lush spruce forests.

As of 1885, there was about 67,500 acres (445,577 mu) of cultivated land in Bay.

== Demographics ==
Historical population
Year	Pop.	±% p.a.
2000	203,665	—
2010	229,252	+1.19%

As of 2015, 212,272 of the 241,079 residents of the county were Uyghur, 26,559 were Han Chinese and 2,248 were from other ethnic groups.

According to the 2002 census, it has a population of 200,000.

As of 1999, 87.03% of the population of the county were Uyghur and 12.08% of the population was Han Chinese.

== Transportation ==
- China National Highway 217

== Historical maps ==
Historical English-language maps including the county:

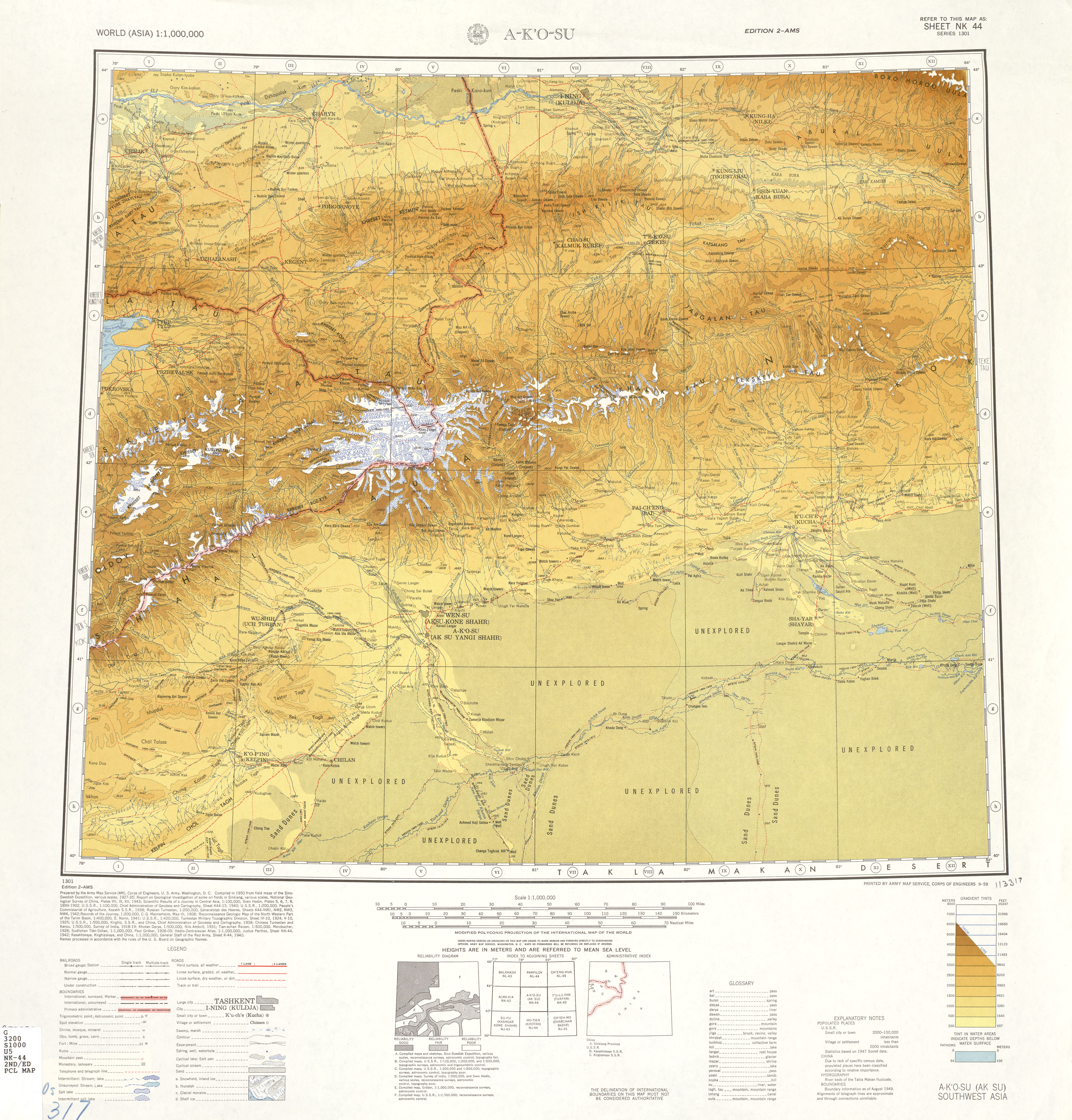
Map including the county (labeled as PAI-CH'ENG (BAI)) and surrounding region from the International Map of the World (AMS, 1950) (Note: From map: "THE DELINEATION OF INTERNATIONAL BOUNDARIES ON THIS MAP MUST NOT BE CONSIDERED AUTHORITATIVE")

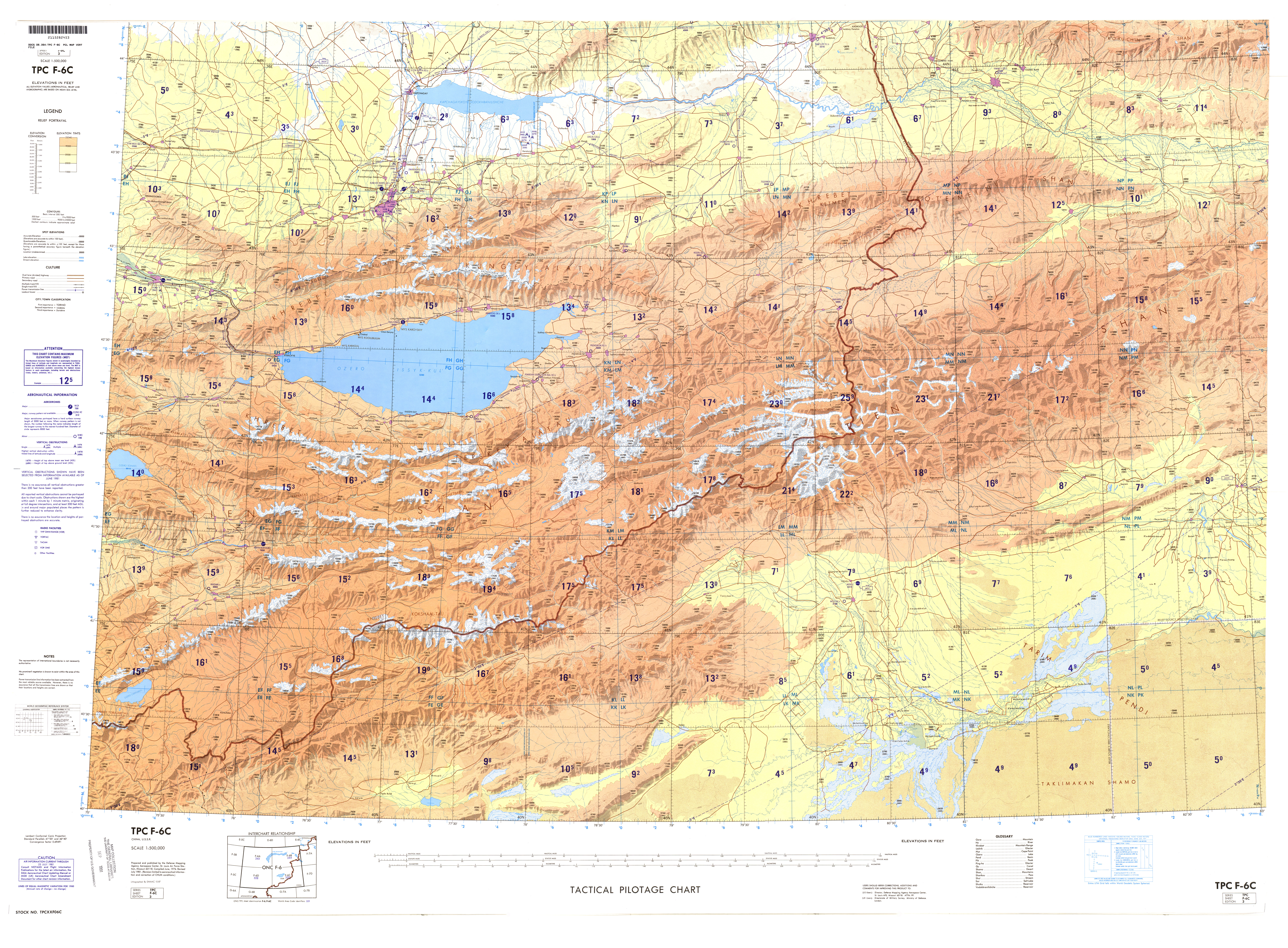
Map including the county (labeled as BAICHENG) (DMA, 1981)

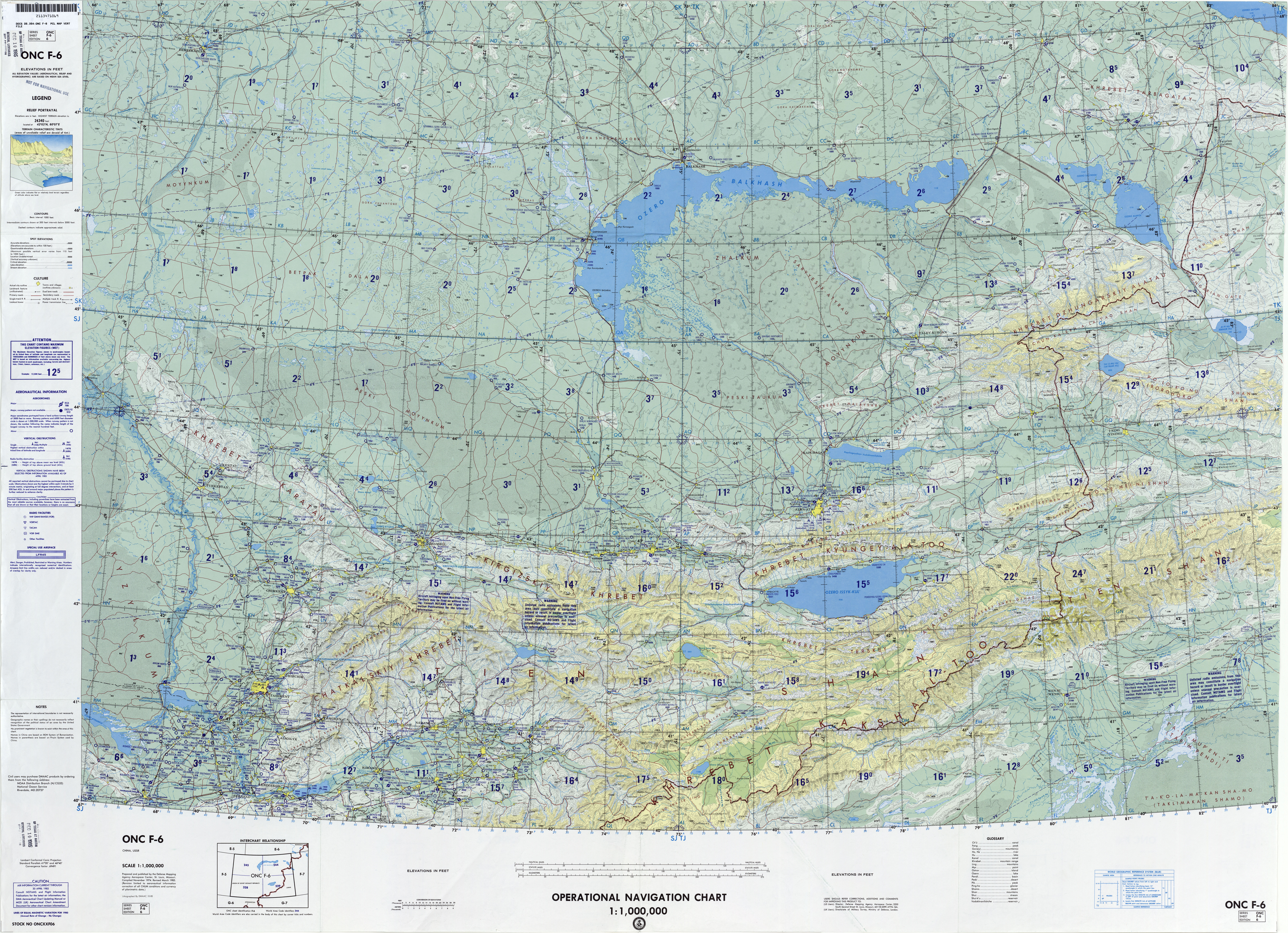
From the Operational Navigation Chart; map including the county (labeled as Pai-ch'eng (Bay)) (DMA, 1985) (Note: From map: "The representation of international boundaries is not necessarily authoritative.")
