= Aksu River (Xinjiang) =

Aksu Saryjaz
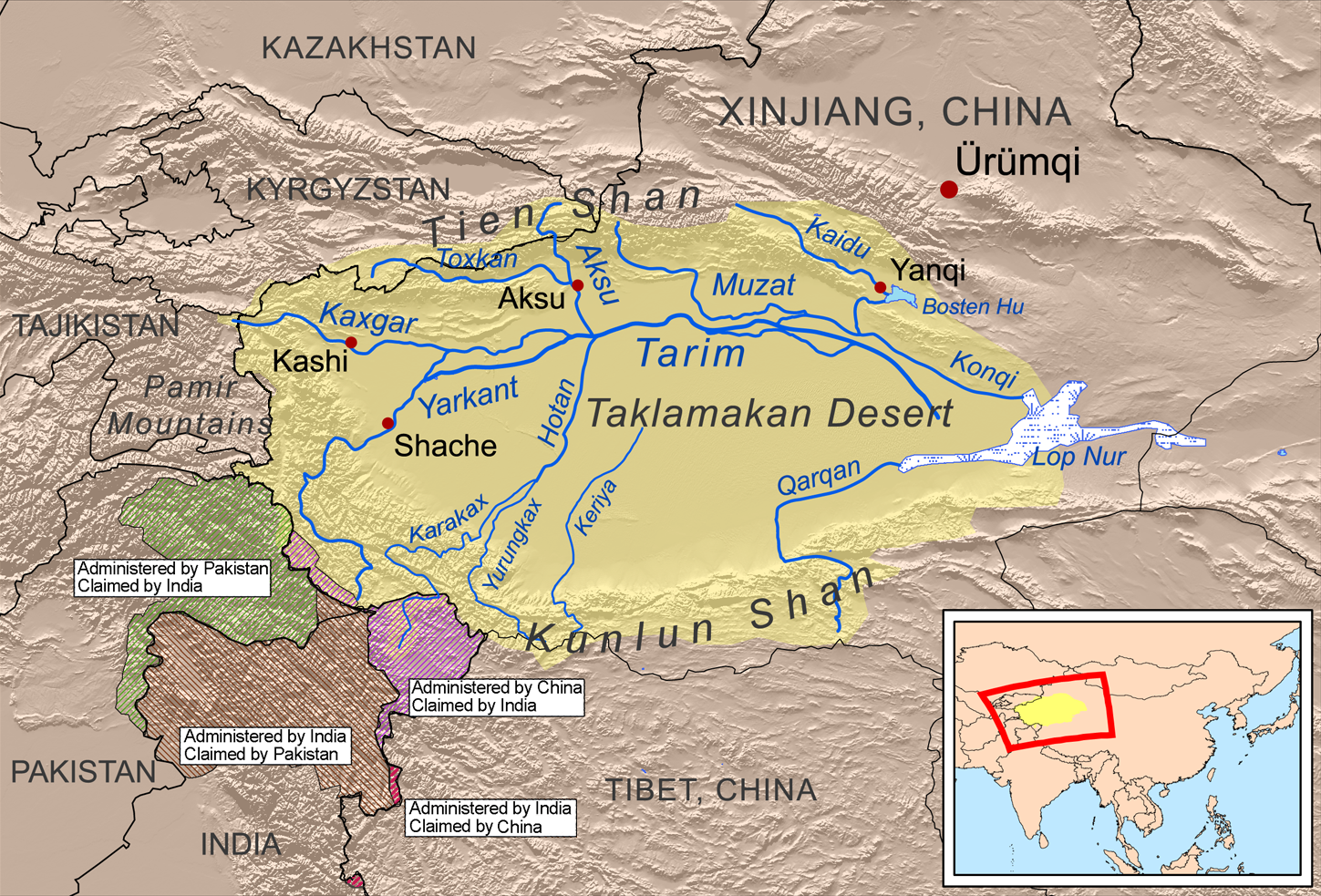
- Aksu River shown within the Tarim basin
- Etymology: Ak Su (white/clear water, Turkish)
- Native name: ئاقسۇ دەرياسى (Uyghur); 阿克苏河 (Chinese); Сарыжаз (Kyrgyz)

Location
- Country: Kyrgyzstan, China

Physical characteristics
- Source: Semyonov's glacier, Kyrgyzstan
- Mouth: Tarim
  - coordinates: 40.459°N 80.866°E
- Length: 282 km (175 mi)
- Basin size: 31,982 km^{2} (12,348 sq mi)
- Discharge
  - location: Aksu, Xinjiang
  - average: 249 m^{3}/s (8,800 cu ft/s)

Basin features
- Progression: Tarim→ Taitema Lake
- Tributaries
  - left: Engilchek, Kayyngdy
  - right: Köölü, Üchköl, Ak-Shyyrak, Toshkan

The Aksu River (Uyghur: ئاقسۇ دەرياسى, romanized: Aqsu deryasi; simplified Chinese: 阿克苏河; traditional Chinese: 阿克蘇河; pinyin: Ākèsū Hé; means "white/clear water" in Uyghur and Kyrgyz languages) is a transboundary river in the Xinjiang province in China and Ak-Suu District of Issyk-Kul Province of Kyrgyzstan. Its upper section in Kyrgyzstan is known as the Saryjaz River or Sarydzhaz River (Chinese: 萨雷扎兹河, Kyrgyz: Сарыжаз). The middle section, between the Kyrgyz-Chinese border and the confluence with the Toshkan, is called Kumarik River (Chinese: 库玛拉克河, Kyrgyz: Сарыжаз). The total length of the river is 282 kilometres (175 mi), of which 197 kilometres (122 mi) are in Kyrgyzstan. It has a drainage basin of 12,900 square kilometres (5,000 sq mi) in Kyrgyzstan. The Aksu is the only one of the Tarim's source rivers to run throughout the year.

== Course ==
The river takes its roots at the Semyonov glacier in the Central Tian Shan mountains of Kyrgyzstan, close to the tripoint with Kazakhstan and China. From here it first runs towards the west, before turning south and breaking through the high mountains and into Xinjiang in the northern parts of the Tarim Basin. At the city of Aksu it meets its main tributary, the Toshkan (Kakshaal), which flows in from the west. After the confluence, the river continues southward and enters the northern edge of the Taklamakan Desert, where it joins the Tarim River.

The main tributaries, from source to mouth, are as follows:

- Köölü (right)
- Engilchek (left)
- Terekti (right)
- Kayyngdy (left)
- Üchköl (right)
- Ak-Shyyrak (right)
- Köykap (left)
- Jaman-Suu (left)
- Jangy-Jer (left)
- Temirsuu (left)
- Toshkan (Kakshaal) (right)
