= Alaqagha =

Alaqagha ئالاقاغا بازىرى (Uyghur) 阿拉哈格镇 (Chinese) Alakaga, Alahage
- Town
- Location in Xinjiang
- Coordinates: 41°32′48″N 082°45′59″E
- Country: China
- Autonomous Region: Xinjiang
- Prefecture: Aksu
- County-level city: Kuqa
- Villages: 25

Area
  - Total: 147.6 km^{2} (57.0 sq mi)

Population (2010)
  - Total: 38,197
  - Density: 258.8/km^{2} (670.3/sq mi)

Ethnic groups
  - Major ethnic groups: Uyghur
- Time zone: UTC+8 (China Standard)

Alaqagha, Alakaga, (Uyghur: ئالاقاغا بازىرى or Alahage Chinese: 阿拉哈格镇), is a town in Kuqa, Aksu Prefecture, Xinjiang, China.

== Name ==
'Alaqagha' / 'Alakaga' is Uyghur for 'flower crow' (花乌鸦). According to local understanding, crows / ravens of various colors used to visit the town frequently.

== History ==
In 1958, Alaqagha Commune (阿拉哈格公社) was established.

In 1984, Alaqagha Commune became Alaqagha Township (阿拉哈格乡).

Between 2000 and 2003, Alaqagha Township became Alaqagha Town (阿拉哈格镇).

On 20 May 2014, after 4:30 pm, special armed police fired on Uyghur protesters and arrested more than 100. The protesters threatened to storm a government building in Alaqagha. According to a local official, police killed two (including Elqem Memtimin, 23) and injured five. The more than 1,000 Uyghur protesters were demanding the release of 25 Uyghur women and schoolgirls who had been detained for wearing headscarves. The protesters had beat the school principal, Tursun Qadir, and the head of the Alaqagha township government and thrown rocks at local government buildings. A round up of protesters continued into the night. Later that year, a Washington Post team was detained in Alaqagha and ultimately deported from the region. On 29 April 2015, Rebiya Kadeer, then President of the World Uyghur Congress, mentioned the town among areas with credible evidence of state violence that merited further investigation.

== Geography ==
Alaqagha is 26 km (16 mi) to the southwest of the Kuqa government seat. The land is flat with the roads on a north–south orientation. Alaqagha is located near the tripoint of Kuqa, Xayar County and Xinhe County (Toksu).

== Administrative divisions ==
Alaqagha includes twenty-five villages:

Villages (Mandarin Chinese Hanyu Pinyin-derived names except where Uyghur is provided):

- Kunasi (Kunasicun; 库纳斯村) 41°31′04″N 082°47′07″E
- Langan (兰干村)
- Bozi (博孜村)
- Hongqi (红旗村), formerly Qiangga (Qianggacun; 强尕村) 41°30′14″N 082°45′54″E
- Baghwen (Bagewan; باغۋەن كەنت / 巴格万村)
- Wukutuogelake (乌库托格拉克村)
- Tieti'erqi (Tieti'erqicun;铁提尔其村) 41°31′59″N 082°45′19″E
- Tuohula (Tuohulacun; 托乎拉村) 41°31′47″N 082°44′48″E
- Paizibage (Paizi Bagecun; 排孜巴格村) 41°31′14″N 082°45′08″E
- Yangduma (Yangdumacun; 央都玛村) 41°30′30″N 082°45′27″E
- Yingsa (英萨村)
- Kalagaqi'airike (Kalagaqi Airikecun; 喀拉尕奇艾日克村) 41°30′21″N 082°44′41″E
- Kuoshi'airike (阔什艾日克村), formerly Kushi'airike (库什艾日克村)
- Tianyuan (田园村), formerly Kaladong (喀拉东村)
- Zige'erqi (Zige'er Qicun; 孜格尔其村) 41°32′29″N 082°43′37″E
- Xiwang (希望村), formerly Ketati (克塔提村)
- Aoyituogelake (奥依托格拉克村)
- Tugemanbaishi (Tugeman Bashicun; 吐格曼拜什村) 41°33′26″N 082°43′28″E, formerly Tugemanbeixi (吐格曼贝希村)
- Bazha (巴扎村), formerly Alahage (阿拉哈格村)
- Jirimuleke (Jirimu Lekecun;吉日木勒克村) 41°31′52″N 082°46′26″E
- Bisute (比苏特村)
- Yingqikai'airike (Yingqikai Airikecun; 英其开艾日克村) 41°34′34″N 082°43′23″E
- Qiaokabositan (Qiaoka Bositancun; 乔喀博斯坦村) 41°33′50″N 082°42′12″E, formerly Qiaokapaisitan (乔喀派斯坦村)
- Tiereke'airike (Tiereke Airikecun; 铁热克艾日克村) 41°30′14″N 082°47′55″E
- Dönglük (Dunlüke, Dunlukecun; دۆڭلۈك كەنت / 墩吕克村) 41°30′57″N 082°47′46″E, formerly Dunluke (墩鲁克村)

== Economy ==
Situated near the intersection of three county-level divisions, the town was traditionally an important market. The local economy is primarily agricultural combined with animal husbandry. Fish are raised in the eastern area including Kunasi. Many fruits are produced including the noted Pyrus nivalis of Qiangga Village, the white peaches of Kunasi Village and the muskmelons of Yingsa Village. The local specialty is smoked plum.

As of 2019, Qiaokabositan Village was considered deeply economically impoverished.

== Demographics ==
Historical population
Year	Pop.	±% p.a.
2000	35,031	—
2010	38,197	+0.87%

As of 1997, 99.6% of the population of Alaqagha was Uyghur.

As of 2005–6, 4.65% of the population of Alaqagha, in total 1,710 of the residents of the town, were considered to be economically impoverished.

== Transportation ==
- China National Highway 217
