= Kuche railway station =

Railway station in Xinjiang, China

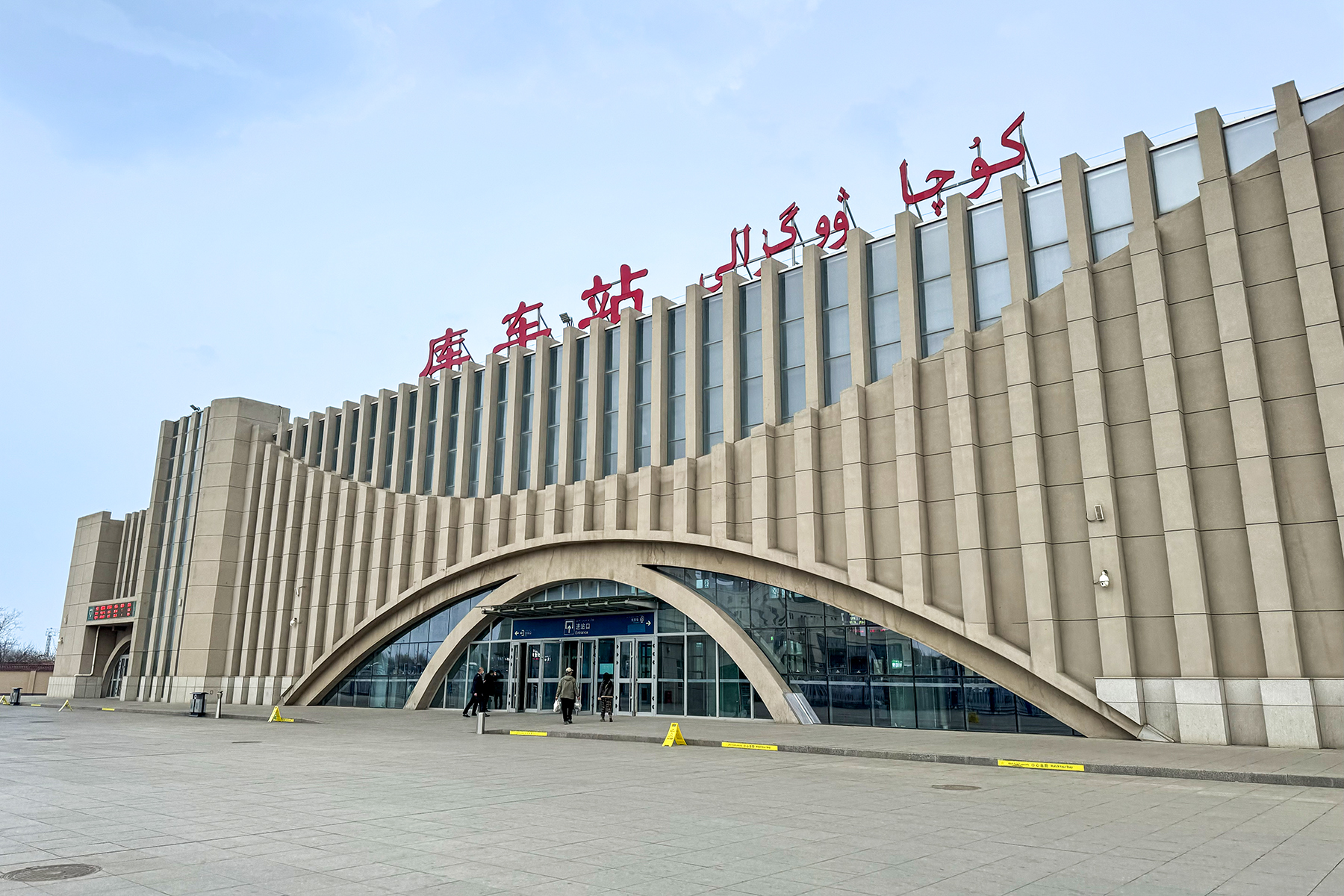
Facade of Kuche Railway Station in 2024

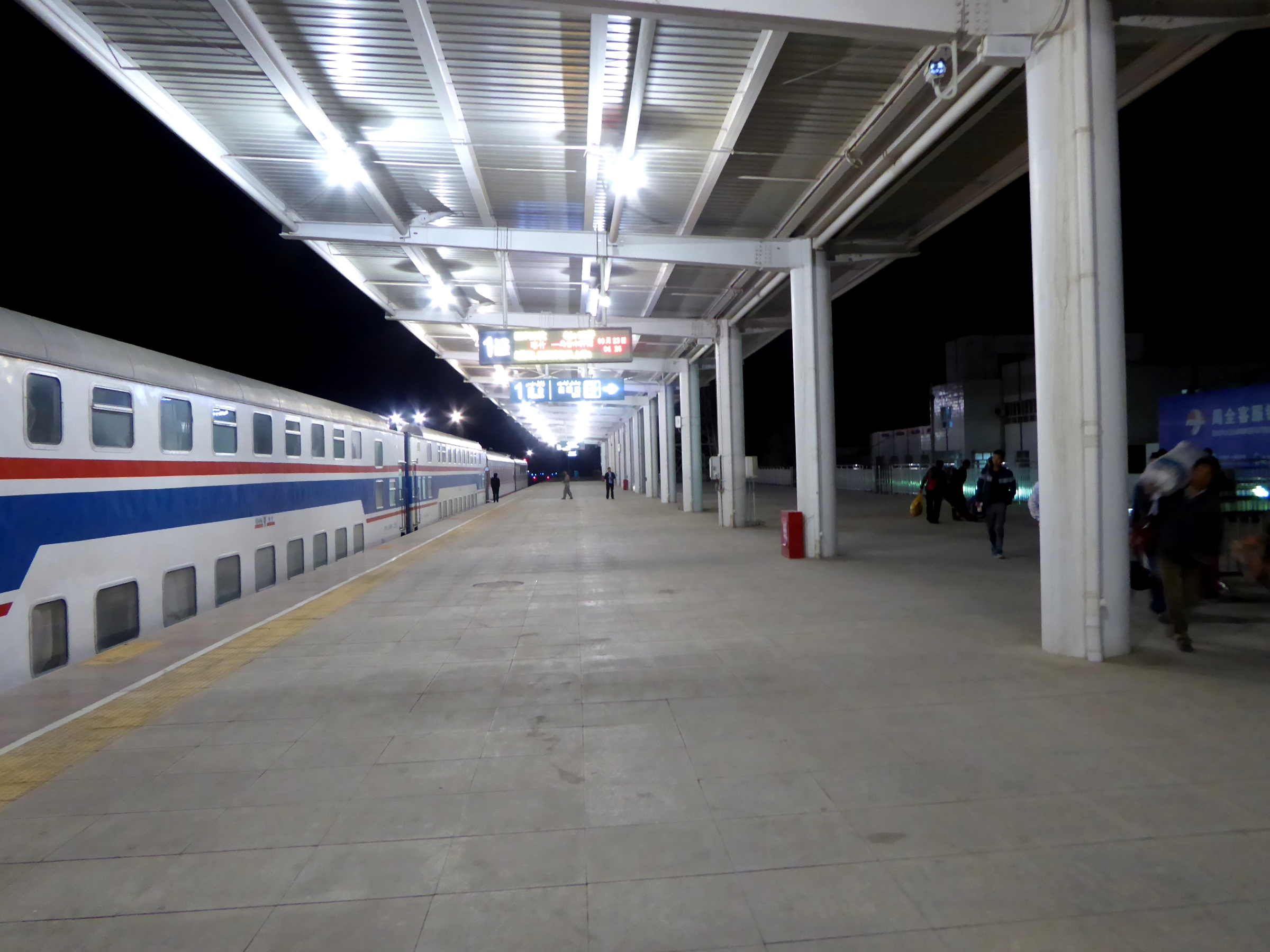
A 25B Double Decker arrives at Kuche railway station

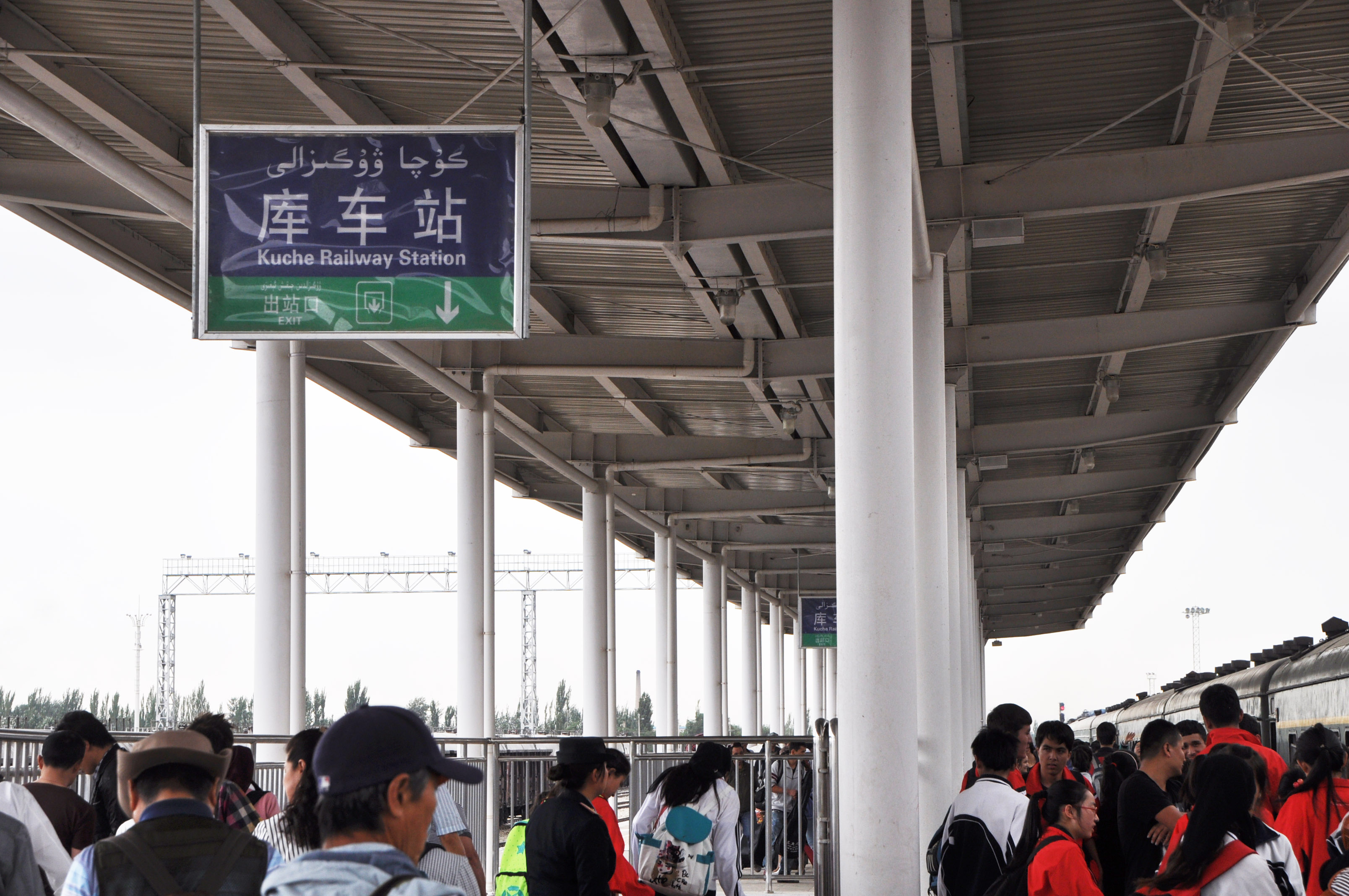
An express train arrives at Kuche railway station

Kuche or Kuqa railway station (Chinese: 库车站) is a railway station on Southern Xinjiang railway, located in Kuche, Kuche County, Aksu Prefecture in Xinjiang Uyghur Autonomous Region.

It was built in 1998 and opened in December 1999, when the railway was extended from Korla to Kashgar. It is served by trains from/to Kashgar, Turpan and Urumqi.

The station is located in Kuche (41.693344°N 83.013816°E) which is a thriving town of oil and natural gas development of the Tarim Basin, and of tourism, as it was once the homeland of the ancient Buddhist Kingdom of Kucha.

== See also ==
- Kucha
