= Kuqa, Xinjiang =

Kuqa: كۇچار شەھىرى (Uyghur); 库车市 (Chinese); Kucha, Kuche, Kuchar, Qiuci
- County-level city
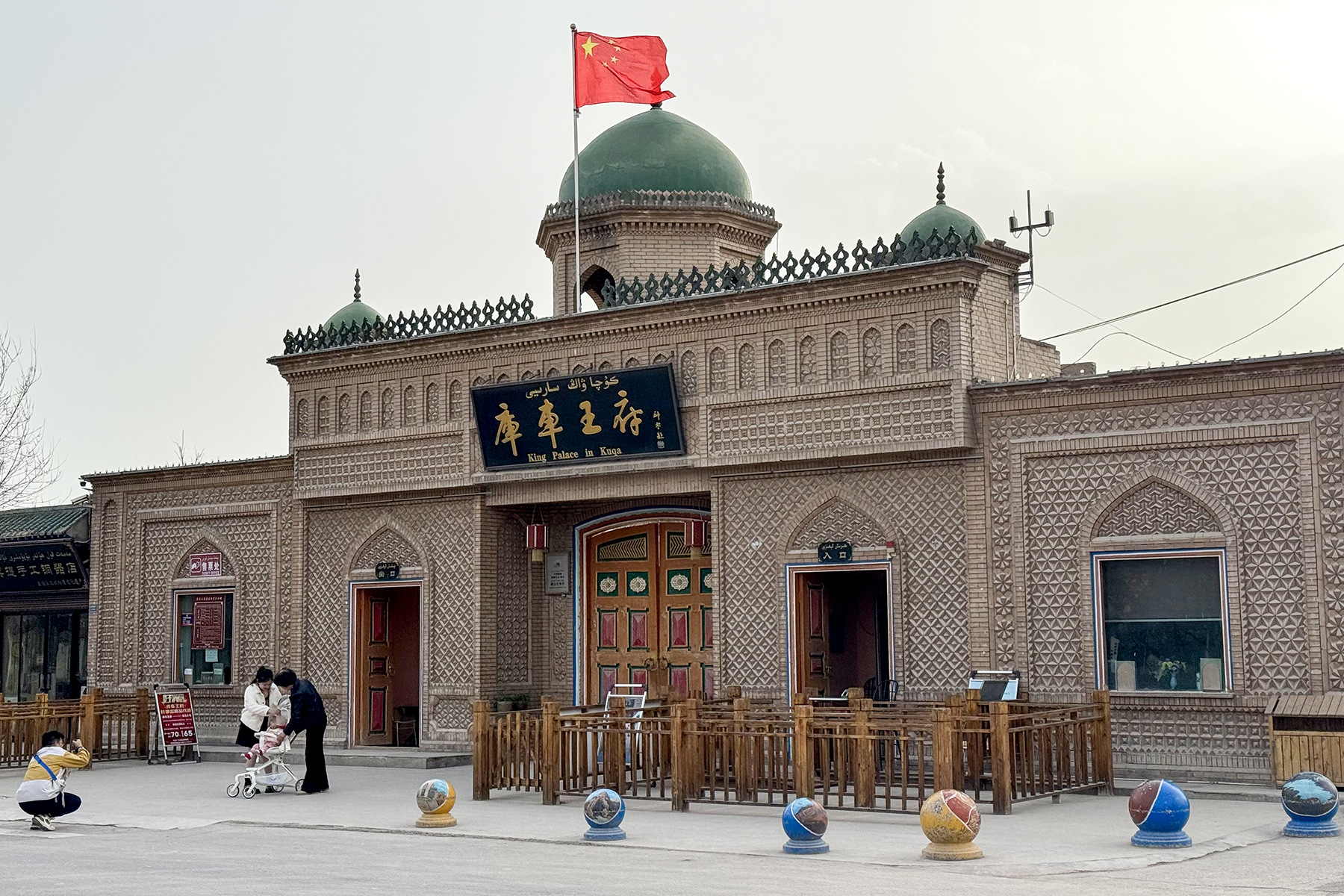
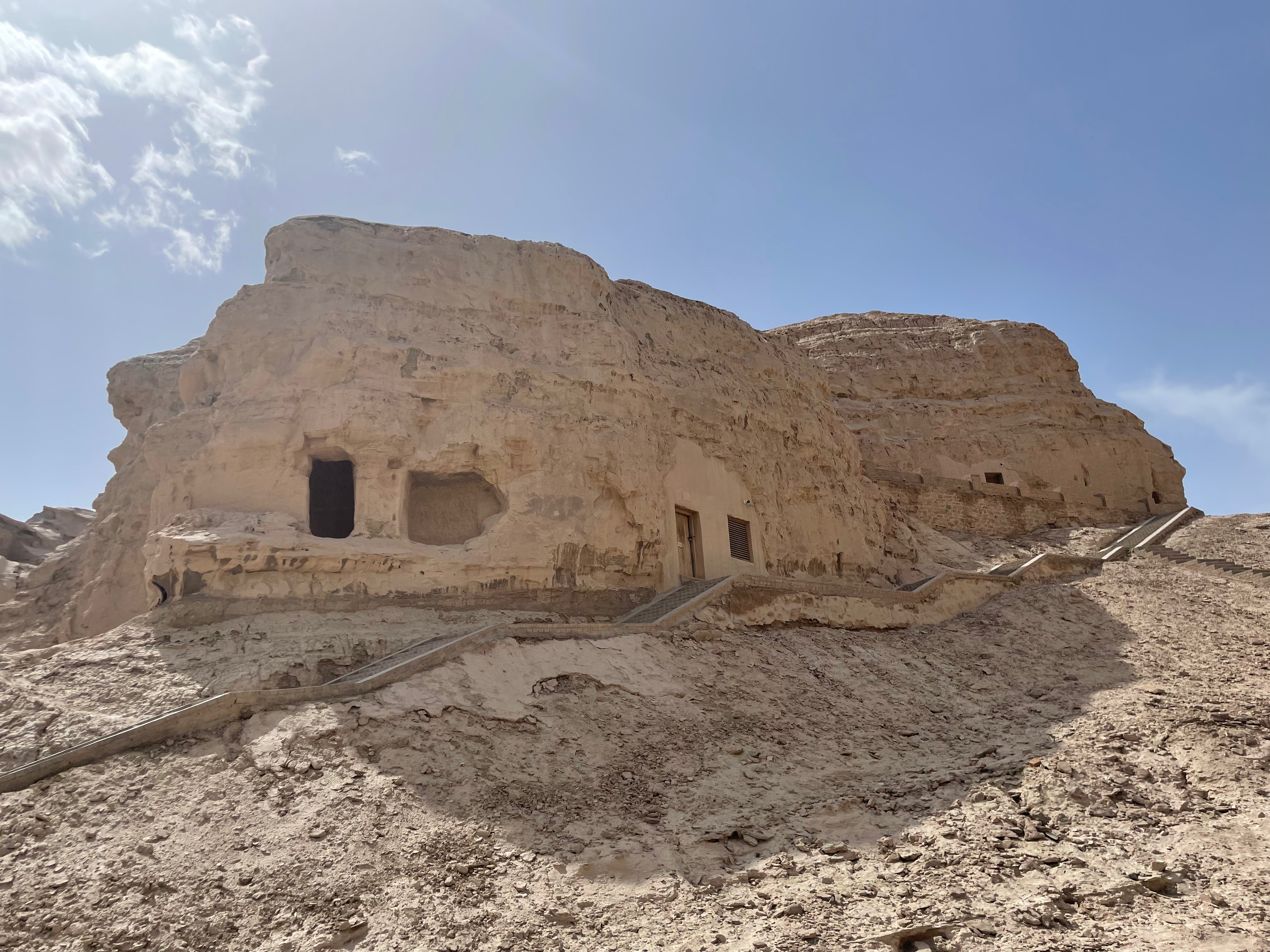
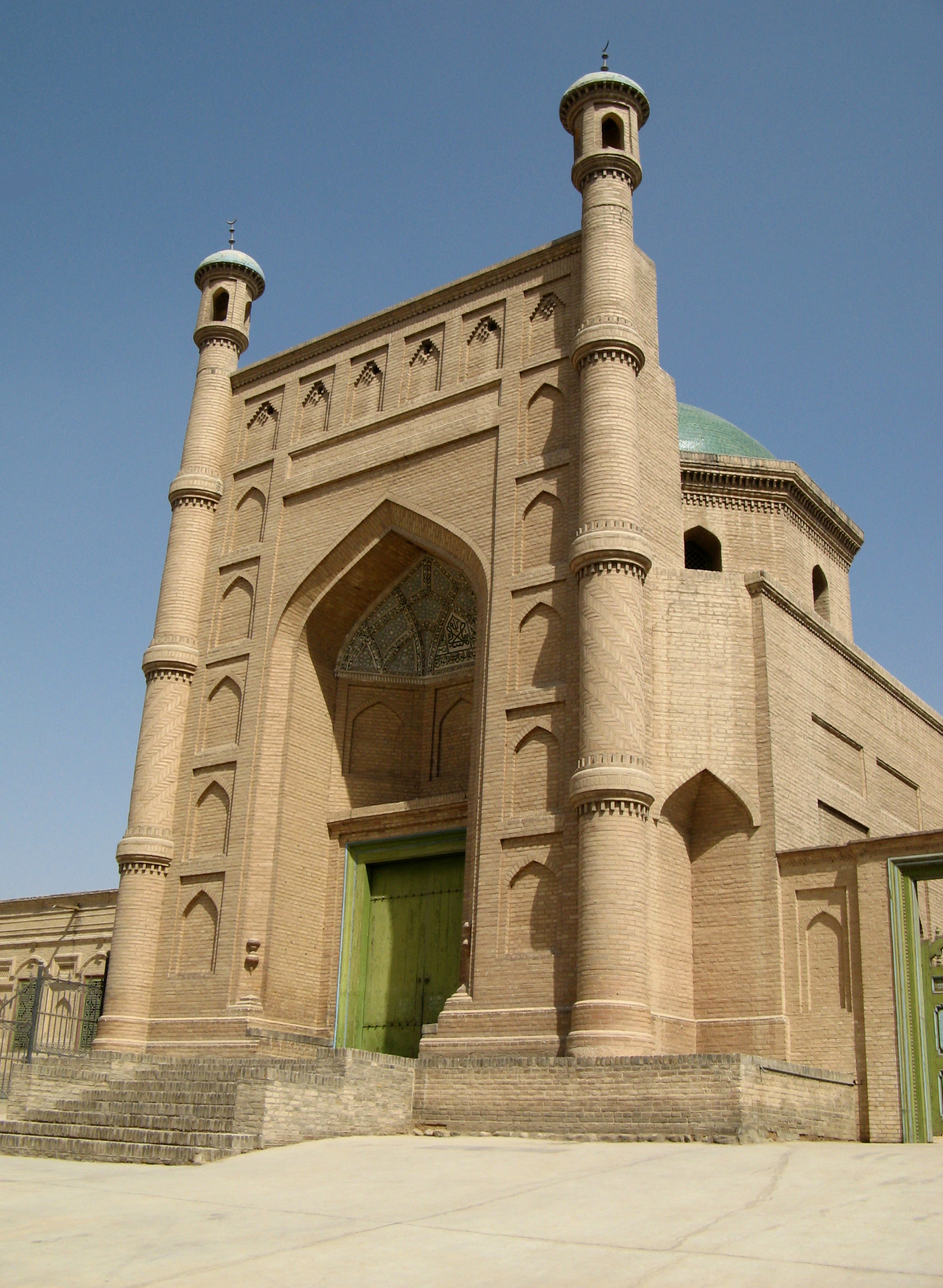
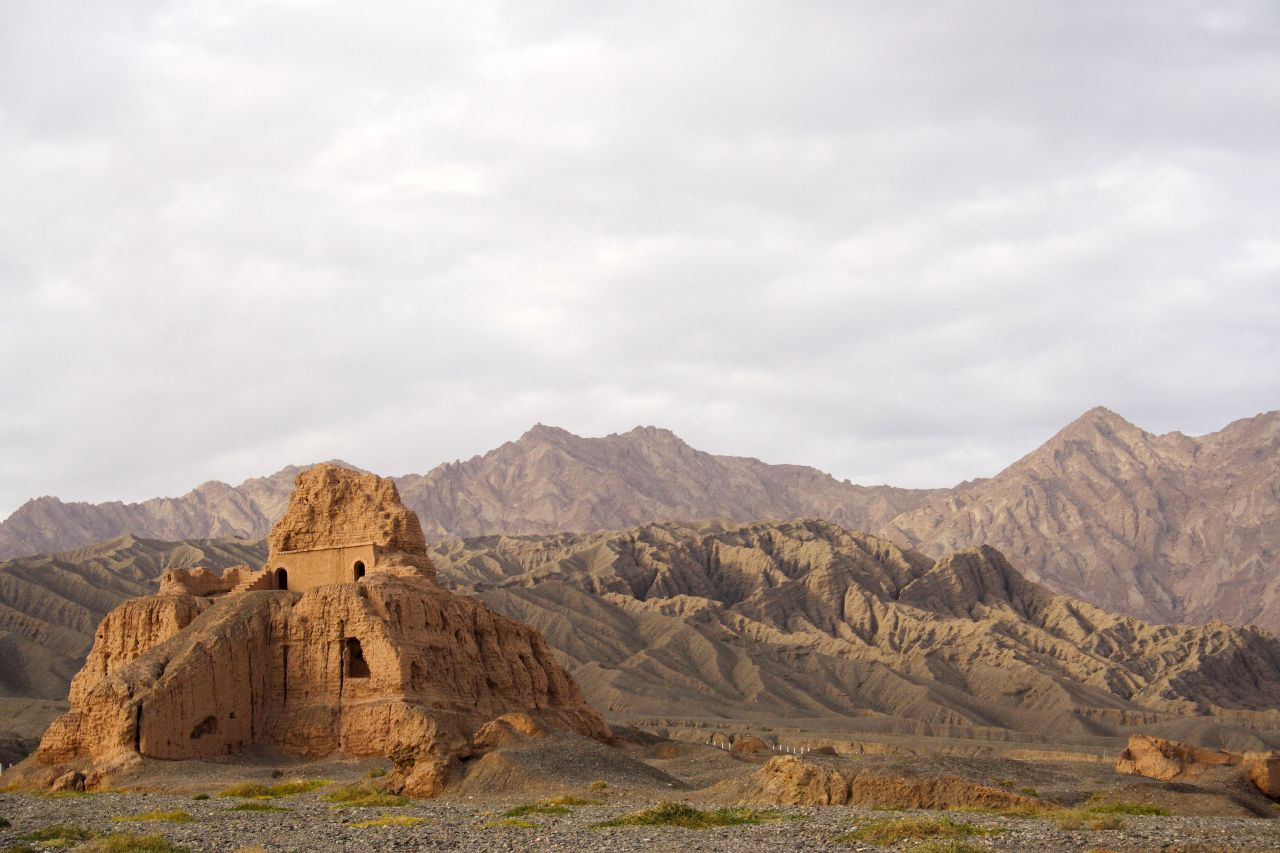
- Kuqa Royal Palace Kizilgaha Caves Kuqa Grand Mosque Ruins of Subashi Temple

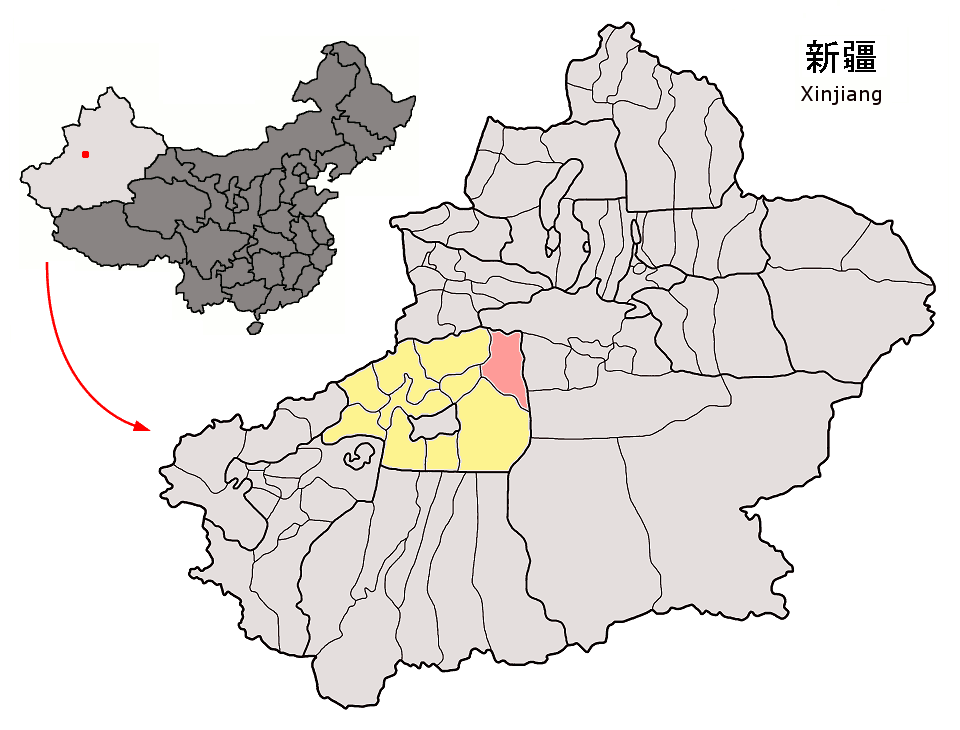
- Location of Kuqa City (red) within Aksu Prefecture (yellow) in Xinjiang

- Location of the seat Kuqa (China)
- Coordinates: 41°43′N 82°58′E
- Country: China
- Autonomous region: Xinjiang
- Prefecture: Aksu
- Municipal seat: Yengisheher Subdistrict (Xincheng Subdistrict)

Area
  - Total: 15,200 km^{2} (5,900 sq mi)
- Elevation: 1,072 m (3,517 ft)

Population (2020)
  - Total: 530,328
  - Density: 34.9/km^{2} (90.4/sq mi)

Ethnic groups
  - Major ethnic groups: Uyghur
- Time zone: UTC+8 (China Standard (Note: Locals in Xinjiang frequently observe UTC+6 (Xinjiang Time), 2 hours behind Beijing.))
- Postal code: 842000
- Website: www.xjkc.gov.cn (in Chinese)

Kuqa

Uyghur name
- Uyghur: كۇچار
Transcriptions
- Latin Yëziqi: Kucha
- Yengi Yeziⱪ: Kuqa
- SASM/GNC: Kuqa
- Siril Yëziqi: Куча

Chinese name
- Simplified Chinese: 库车
- Traditional Chinese: 庫車
Transcriptions
Standard Mandarin
- Hanyu Pinyin: Kùchē

Alternative Chinese name
- Simplified Chinese: 龟兹
- Traditional Chinese: 龜茲
Transcriptions
Standard Mandarin
- Hanyu Pinyin: Qiūcí

Kuqa (Note: The official spelling is "Kuqa". Alternate spellings and names include Kucha, Kuchar, Kuche, Kuchi, Kuchu, Kocha, Kuchel, and Kuga.) (/ˈkuːtʃə/ KOO-chə) is a county-level city in Aksu Prefecture, Xinjiang, China. It is located in the center of Xinjiang, where the northern limit of the Tarim Basin meets the southern foot of the Tian Shan mountains. The area was once the site of the ancient Buddhist kingdom of Kucha, an important Central Asian state during the height of the Silk Road. The Uyghur-majority city is known for its Buddhist caves and temple ruins which predate the arrival of Islam.

== History ==
The archaeological excavation of Neolithic cultural sites, such as the Haradun site (Chinese: 龟兹故城), indicates that ancient human activity occurred in the area of present-day city as early as 12,000 years ago.

According to the Book of Han (completed in 111 CE), Kucha was the largest of the "Thirty-Six Kingdoms of the Western Regions", with a population of 81,317, including 21,076 persons able to bear arms.

In 630, Xuanzang, a well-known Chinese Buddhist monk, scholar, traveller and translator, visited Kucha during the early Tang dynasty.

In the book Hudud al-'Alam, written in 982 by an unknown Arab or Persian writer and presented to Abu'l Haret Muhammad of Guzgan (present-day northern Afghanistan), the following is written regarding Kucha:

"Kucha is located on the Chinese border and belongs to China, but the indigenous people, Dokuzoguzes, at times are engaged in raids and looting. This city has many advantages."

Mirza Muhammad Haidar Dughlat, a military general, in his book Tarikh-i-Rashidi used the name Kūsān for Kucha.

Mahmud Kashgari, in his Compendium of Turkic Languages (Dīwān Lughāt al-Turk), wrote the following about Kucha: "It is one of the cities built by Zülqarnayin" (Alexander the Great). He also wrote that Kucha was a Uyghur town.

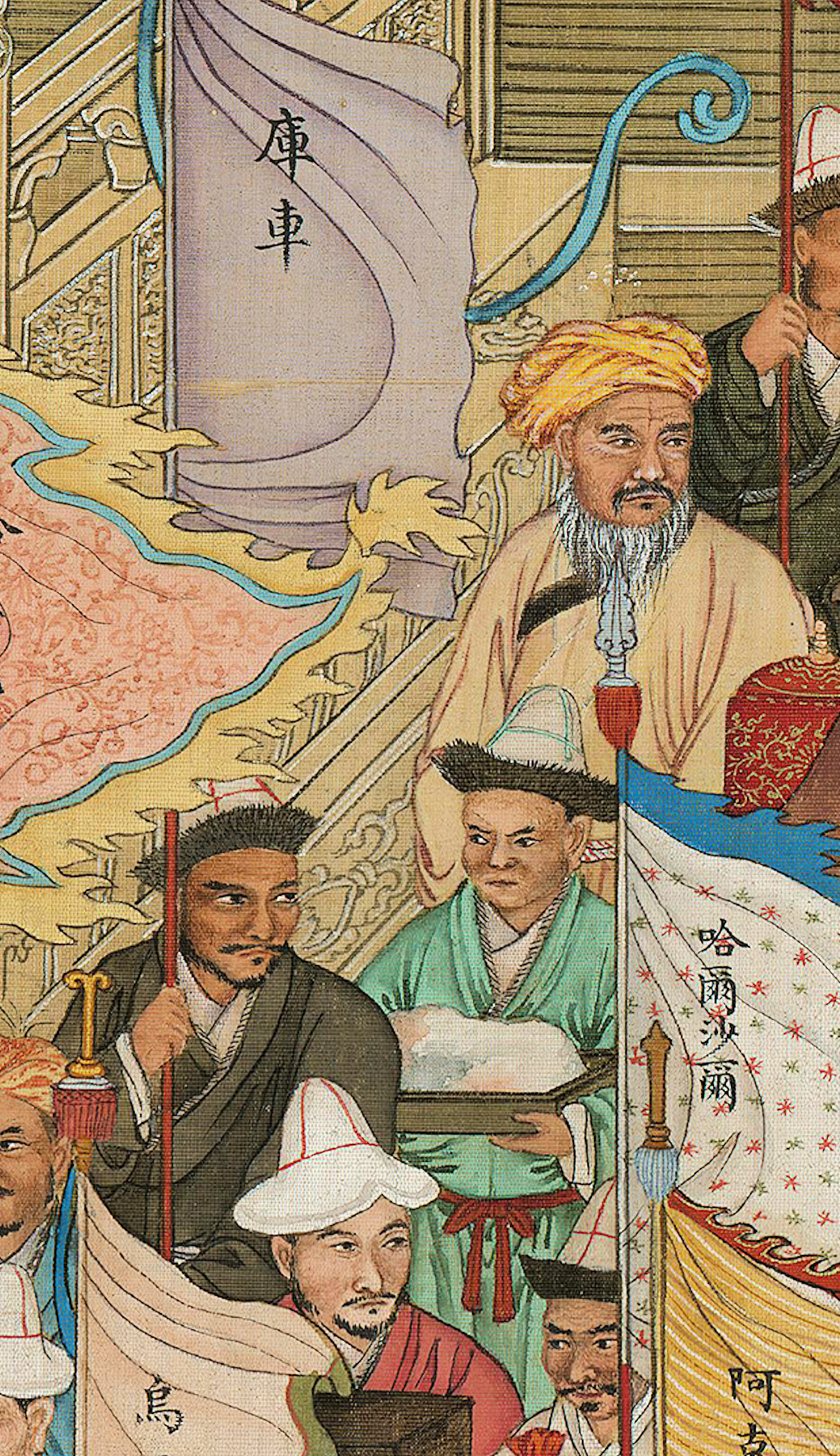
Kucha (庫車) delegates in Beijing, from the painting Ten Thousand Nations Coming to Pay Tribute (1761)

In 1758, the Qing dynasty took control of the area, and the Chinese transliteration Kuche (庫車) was made the name of the area. Kucha was made a county in 1913, within the fourth district of Xinjiang Province. In 1930, Xinjiang was partitioned into 12 districts to establish Tokesu County.

On 20 December 2019, Kuqa County was disestablished and Kuqa City was created in its place.

== Climate ==
=== Geography ===
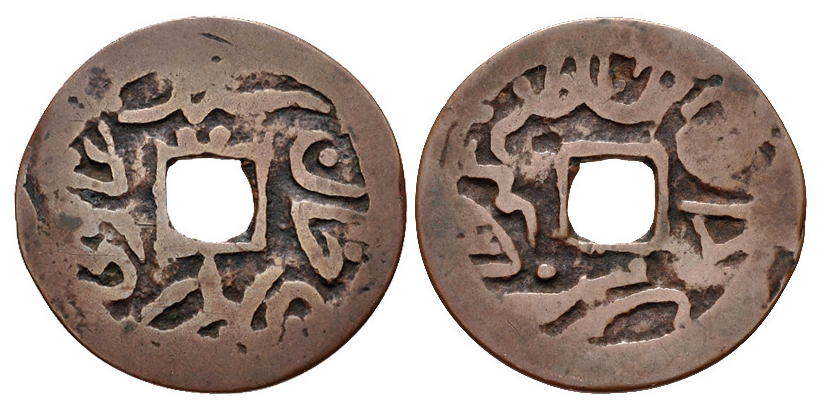
Coinage of Rashidin Khoja. Kucha mint. Dually dated AH 1281 and RY 2 (AD 1864). Obverse legend: Said Ghazi Rashidin Khan. Ithneen in Arabic. Reverse: Zarb dar al-sultanat Kucha, 1281 in Arabic.

Kuqa is located at the southern periphery of the Tian Shan range, the northern portion of the Tarim Basin, and the centre of Xinjiang. It occupies part of the northeastern portion of Aksu Prefecture, bordering Xinhe County and Xayar County, as well as Luntai County and Heiing County in the Bayingolin Mongol Autonomous Prefecture.

The city has a continental desert climate (Köppen BWk), with an average annual precipitation of 74.6 millimetres (2.94 in), a majority of which occurs in summer. The monthly 24-hour average temperature ranges from −7.2 °C (19.0 °F) in January to 25.3 °C (77.5 °F) in July, and the annual mean is 11.29 °C (52.3 °F). The frost-free period lasts for 266 days on average. With monthly per cent possible sunshine ranging from 54% in March to 69% in September and October, sunshine is abundant and the city receives 2,712 hours of bright sunshine annually.

Climate data for Kuqa, elevation 1,082 m (3,550 ft), (1991–2020 normals, extremes 1951–present)
Month	Jan	Feb	Mar	Apr	May	Jun	Jul	Aug	Sep	Oct	Nov	Dec	Year
Record high °C (°F)	7.8 (46.0)	16.4 (61.5)	24.1 (75.4)	33.2 (91.8)	35.1 (95.2)	38.2 (100.8)	40.8 (105.4)	39.5 (103.1)	35.7 (96.3)	28.5 (83.3)	20.7 (69.3)	9.2 (48.6)	40.8 (105.4)
Mean daily maximum °C (°F)	−1.7 (28.9)	5.3 (41.5)	14.1 (57.4)	22.2 (72.0)	26.9 (80.4)	30.5 (86.9)	32.1 (89.8)	30.9 (87.6)	26.4 (79.5)	19.4 (66.9)	9.7 (49.5)	0.2 (32.4)	18.0 (64.4)
Daily mean °C (°F)	−7.7 (18.1)	−0.9 (30.4)	7.7 (45.9)	15.4 (59.7)	19.9 (67.8)	23.4 (74.1)	24.9 (76.8)	23.7 (74.7)	18.8 (65.8)	10.9 (51.6)	2.7 (36.9)	−5.5 (22.1)	11.1 (52.0)
Mean daily minimum °C (°F)	−12.8 (9.0)	−6.3 (20.7)	1.8 (35.2)	8.9 (48.0)	13.0 (55.4)	16.4 (61.5)	18.0 (64.4)	16.9 (62.4)	12.1 (53.8)	4.4 (39.9)	−2.6 (27.3)	−9.9 (14.2)	5.0 (41.0)
Record low °C (°F)	−23.4 (−10.1)	−20.2 (−4.4)	−8.4 (16.9)	−2.0 (28.4)	0.7 (33.3)	7.5 (45.5)	10.4 (50.7)	7.6 (45.7)	3.2 (37.8)	−3.1 (26.4)	−16.3 (2.7)	−22.3 (−8.1)	−23.4 (−10.1)
Average precipitation mm (inches)	2.6 (0.10)	3.1 (0.12)	1.6 (0.06)	3.5 (0.14)	9.3 (0.37)	19.7 (0.78)	13.0 (0.51)	14.6 (0.57)	6.2 (0.24)	4.0 (0.16)	2.7 (0.11)	1.9 (0.07)	82.2 (3.23)
Average precipitation days (≥ 0.1 mm)	3.2	1.8	1.2	1.8	3.6	7.0	7.0	6.2	3.9	1.4	1.3	2.4	40.8
Average snowy days	5.2	2.5	0.5	0.2	0	0	0	0	0	0	1.3	4.5	14.2
Average relative humidity (%)	68	55	38	34	38	43	46	49	53	56	60	70	51
Mean monthly sunshine hours	186.9	198.4	231.4	245.1	278.5	280.6	291.9	277.1	255.7	247.4	204.4	166.3	2,863.7
Percentage possible sunshine	63	65	62	60	61	62	64	66	70	74	71	59	65
Source: China Meteorological Administration all-time February highall-time September high

== Administrative divisions ==
Kuqa has 4 subdistricts, 8 towns, 6 townships, and 1 other area under its administration:

Name	Simplified Chinese	Hanyu Pinyin	Uyghur (UEY)	Uyghur Latin (ULY)	Administrative division code
Subdistricts
Reste Subdistrict	热斯坦街道	Rèsītǎn Jiēdào	رەستە كوچا باشقارمىسى	reste kocha bashqarmisi	652902001
Saqsaq Subdistrict	萨克萨克街道	Sàkèsàkè Jiēdào	ساقساق كوچا باشقارمىسى	saqsaq kocha bashqarmisi	652902002
Yengisheher Subdistrict (Xincheng Subdistrict)	新城街道	Xīnchéng Jiēdào	يېڭىشەھەر كوچا باشقارمىسى	yëngisheher kocha bashqarmisi	652902003
Sherqiy Subdistrict (Dongcheng Subdistrict)	东城街道	Dōngchéng Jiēdào	شەرقىي شەھەر كوچا باشقارمىسى	sherqiy sheher kocha bashqarmisi	652902004
Towns
Uchar Town	乌恰镇	Wūqià Zhèn	ئۇچار بازىرى	Uchar baziri	652902101
Alakaga Town	阿拉哈格镇	Ālāhāgé Zhèn	ئالاقاغا بازىرى	Alaqagha baziri	652902102
Chimen Town	齐满镇	Qímǎn Zhèn	چىمەن بازىرى	chimen baziri	652902103
Dongqotan Town	墩阔坦镇	Dūnkuòtǎn Zhèn	دۆڭقوتان بازىرى	döngqotan baziri	652902104
Yaqa Town	牙哈镇	Yáhā Zhèn	ياقا بازىرى	yaqa baziri	652902105
Uzun Town	乌尊镇	Wūzūn Zhèn	ئۇزۇن بازىرى	Uzun baziri	652902106
Ishxila Town	伊西哈拉镇	Yīxīhālā Zhèn	ئىشخىلا بازىرى	Ishxila baziri	652902107
Erbatey Town	二八台镇	Èrbātái Zhèn	ئەرباتەي بازىرى	Erbatey baziri	652902108
Townships
Uchosteng Township	玉奇吾斯塘乡	Yùqíwúsītáng Xiāng	ئۈچئۆستەڭ يېزىسى	Üch'östeng yëzisi	652902201
Biyixbag Township	比西巴格乡	Bǐxībāgé Xiāng	بېھىشباغ يېزىسى	bëhishbagh yëzisi	652902202
Xanqitam Township	哈尼喀塔木乡	Hāníkātǎmù Xiāng	خانقىتام يېزىسى	xanqitam yëzisi	652902203
Aqosteng Township	阿克吾斯塘乡	Ākèwúsītáng Xiāng	ئاقئۆستەڭ يېزىسى	Aq'östeng yëzisi	652902204
Aghi Township	阿格乡	Āgé Xiāng	ئاغى يېزىسى	Aghi yëzisi	652902205
Tarim Township	塔里木乡	Tǎlǐmù Xiāng	تارىم يېزىسى	tarim yëzisi	652902206

== Economy ==
Agricultural products include wheat, corn, rice, cotton as well as pears, apricots, melons, grapes, pomegranates, and figs. Specialty products include Sanbei sheep (三北羊) lambskin, white apricots, and thin-shelled walnuts. Mineral resources include oil and coal. Industries include coal mining, tractor manufacturing and repair, construction and processing for non-staple foods.

In 1885, there was about 99,200 acres (654,476 mu) of cultivated land in what is now Kuqa City.

== Demographics ==
Historical population
Year	Pop.	±% p.a.
2000	388,593	—
2010	462,588	+1.76%

Uyghurs constitute a supermajority of Kuqa's population, while the Han Chinese form a significant minority. In 1999, 89.93% of the population of Kuqa County was Uyghur and 9.49% was Han Chinese. The ethnic composition was almost the same in 2015, with 440,125 of the 492,535 residents (89.3%) of Kuqa being Uyghur, 49,021 (9.9%) Han Chinese, and 3,389 from other ethnic groups.

== Transportation ==
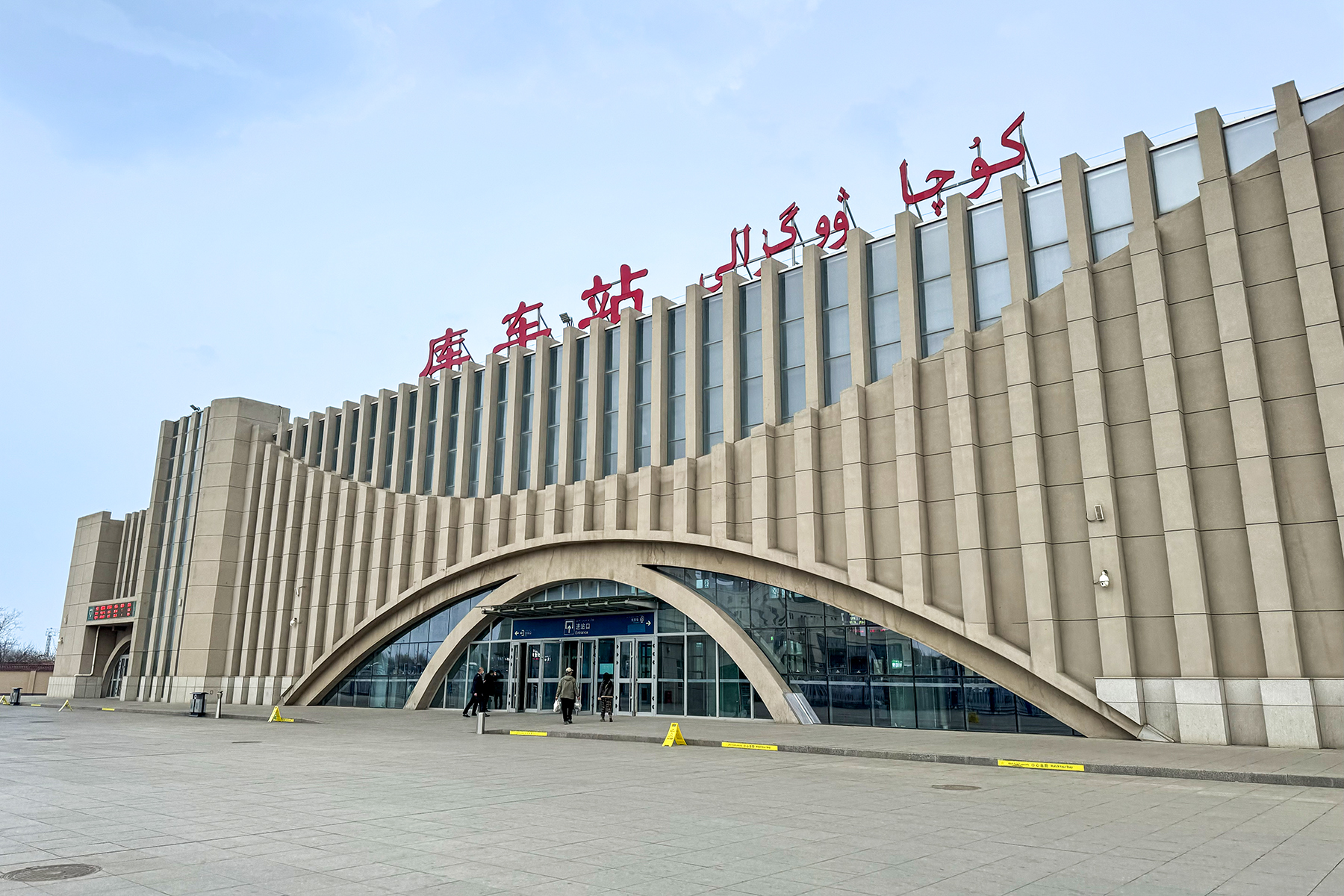
Kuqa Railway Station

Kuqa is served by China National Highway 217, China National Highway 314, the Southern Xinjiang Railway and Kuqa Qiuci Airport.

== Kuqa Town ==
Kuqa is also the name of the central town (Chinese: 库车镇), located in the easternmost area of Kuqa City. It is the second largest town of Aksu Prefecture. It has an area of 14,528.74 square meters and a population of 470,600 people, composed of fourteen ethnic groups, including Uyghurs, Han, Hui, and Mongols. Kuqa is a thriving town of oil and natural gas development in the Tarim Basin, as well as tourism, as it was once the site of the ancient Buddhist kingdom of Kucha. Tourist attractions include the Kumtura Caves, Subashi Temple Ruins, and Kizilgaha Caves.

== Notable people ==
- Qurban Mamut, former editor-in-chief of the official Xinjiang Cultural Journal (《新疆文化》) and detainee in the Xinjiang re-education camps

== Historical maps ==
Historical English-language maps including Kuqa
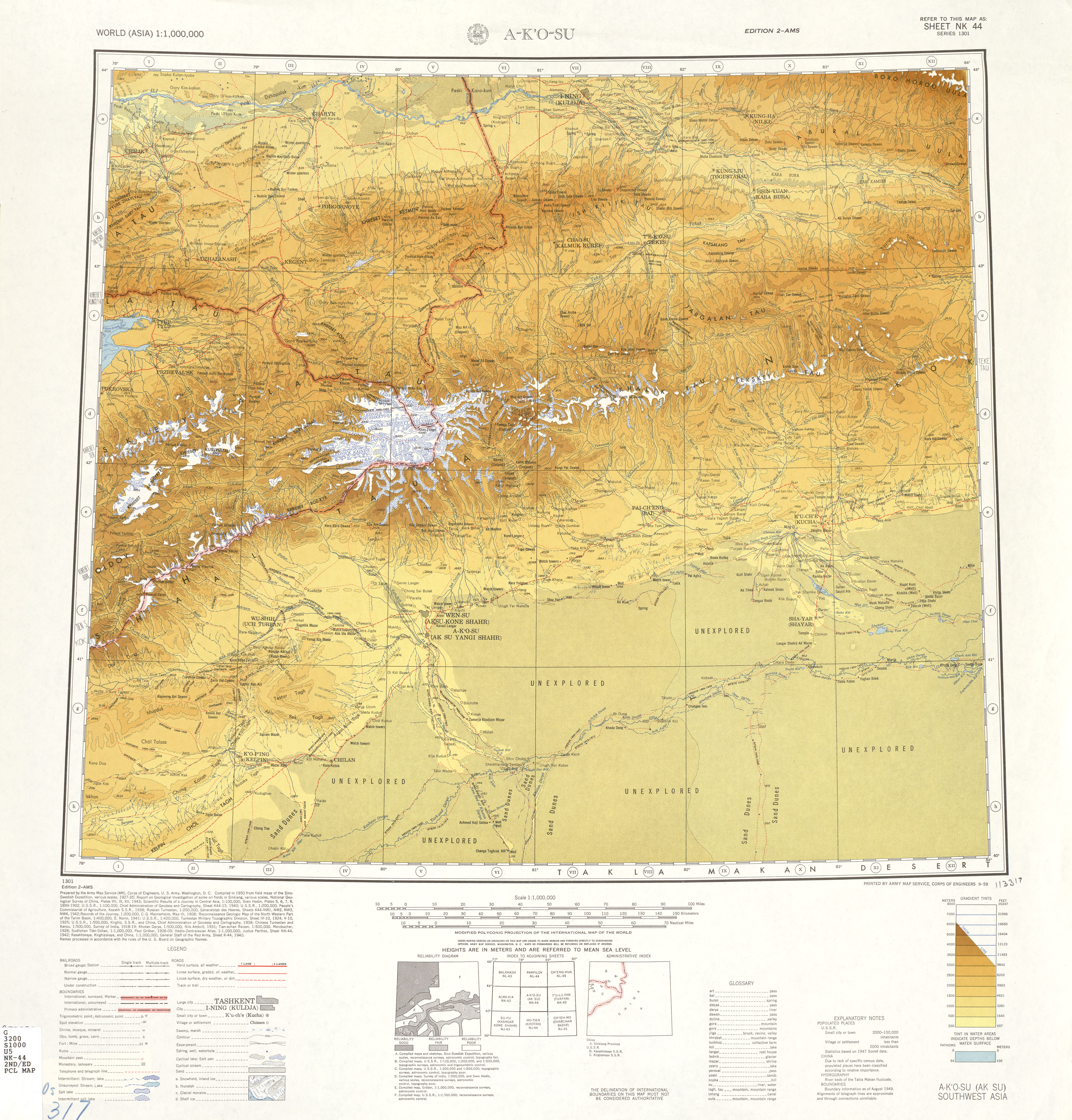
Map including Kuqa (labeled as K'U-CH'E (KUCHA)) and surrounding region from the International Map of the World (AMS, 1950) (Note: From map: "THE DELINEATION OF INTERNATIONAL BOUNDARIES ON THIS MAP MUST NOT BE CONSIDERED AUTHORITATIVE")

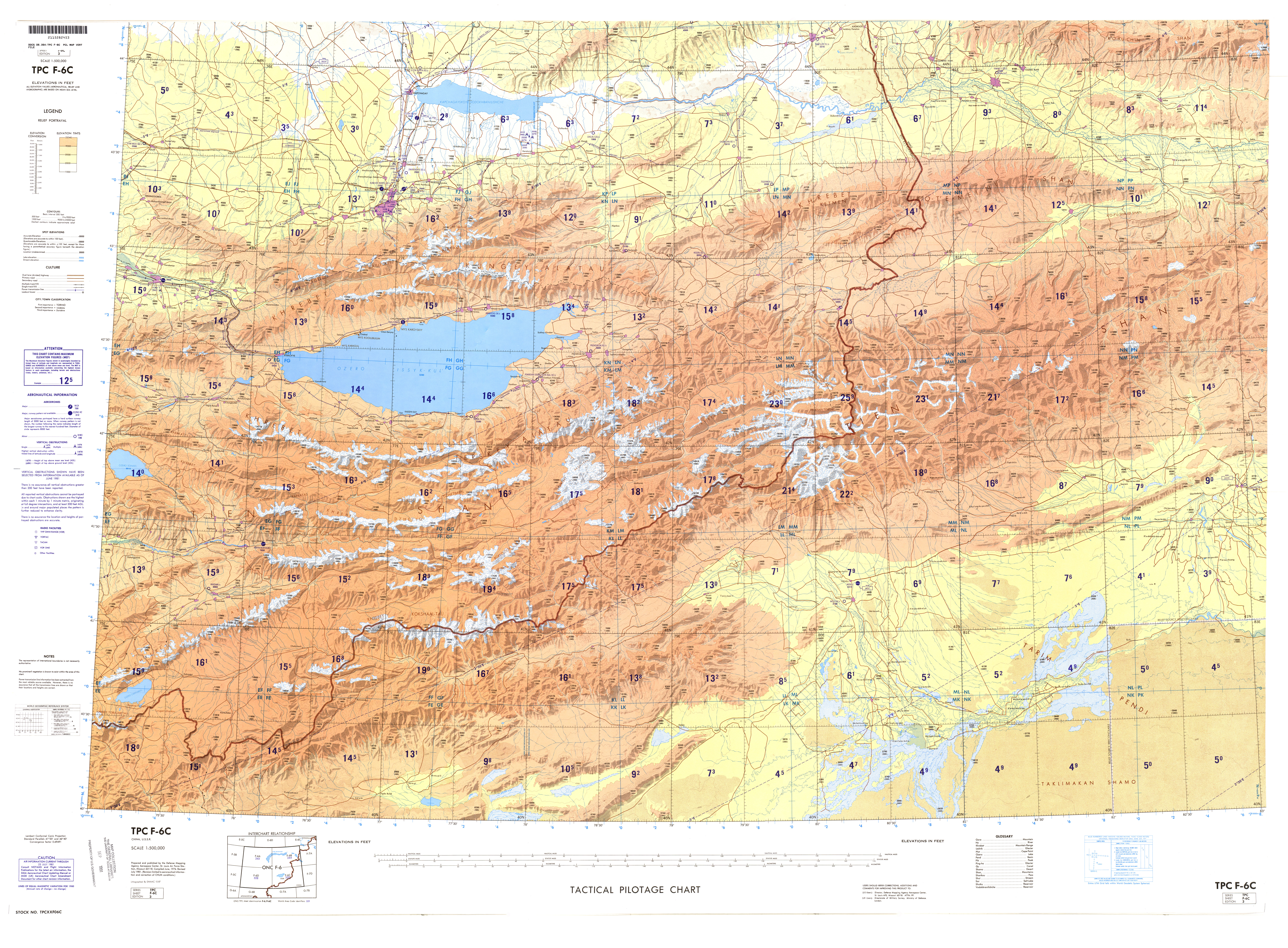
Map including Kuqa (labeled as Kuga/ Kuche/ Kuqaxian) (DMA, 1981)

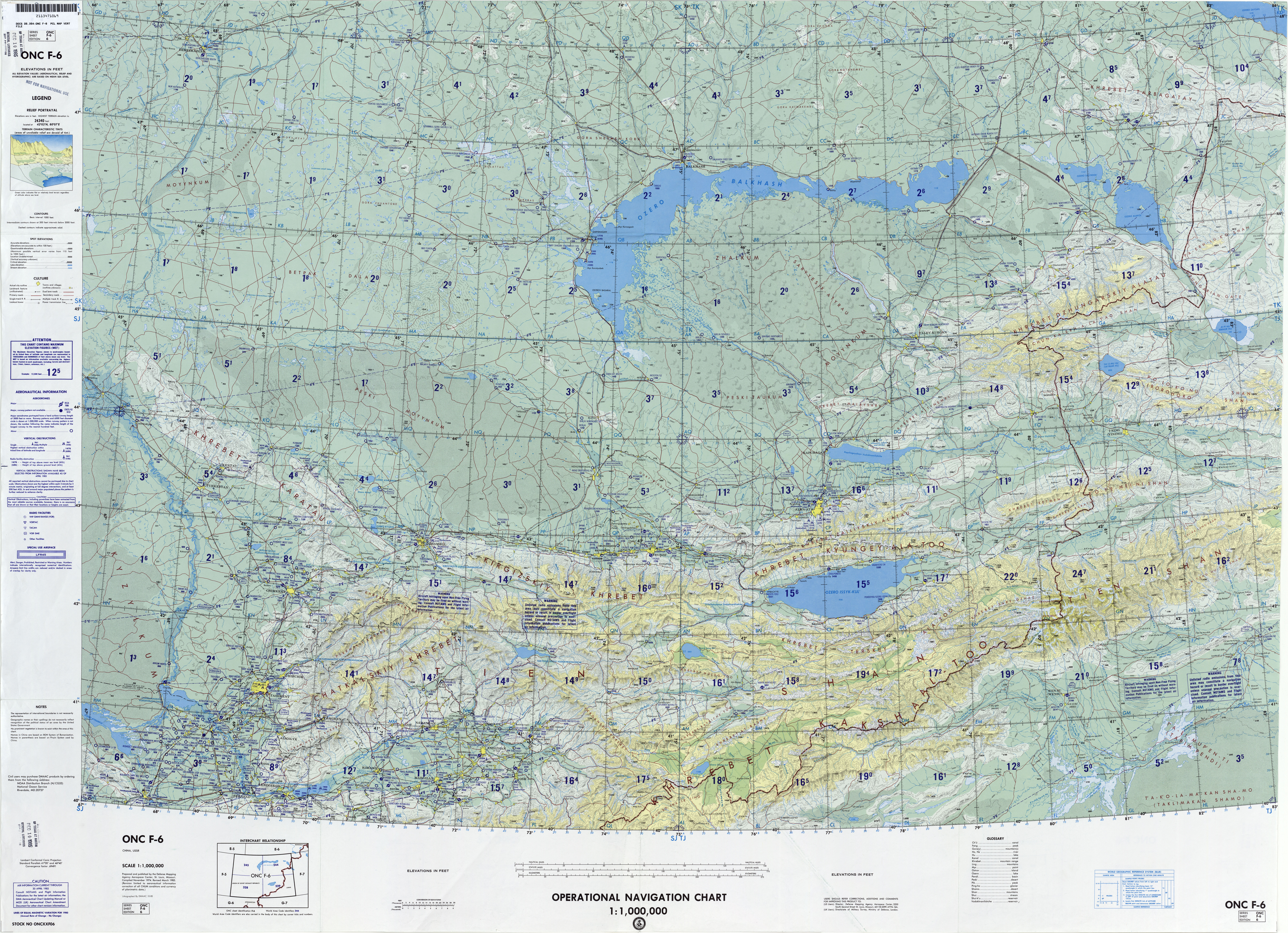
From the Operational Navigation Chart; map including Kuqa (K'u-ch'e) (DMA, 1985) (Note: From map: "The representation of international boundaries is not necessarily authoritative.")

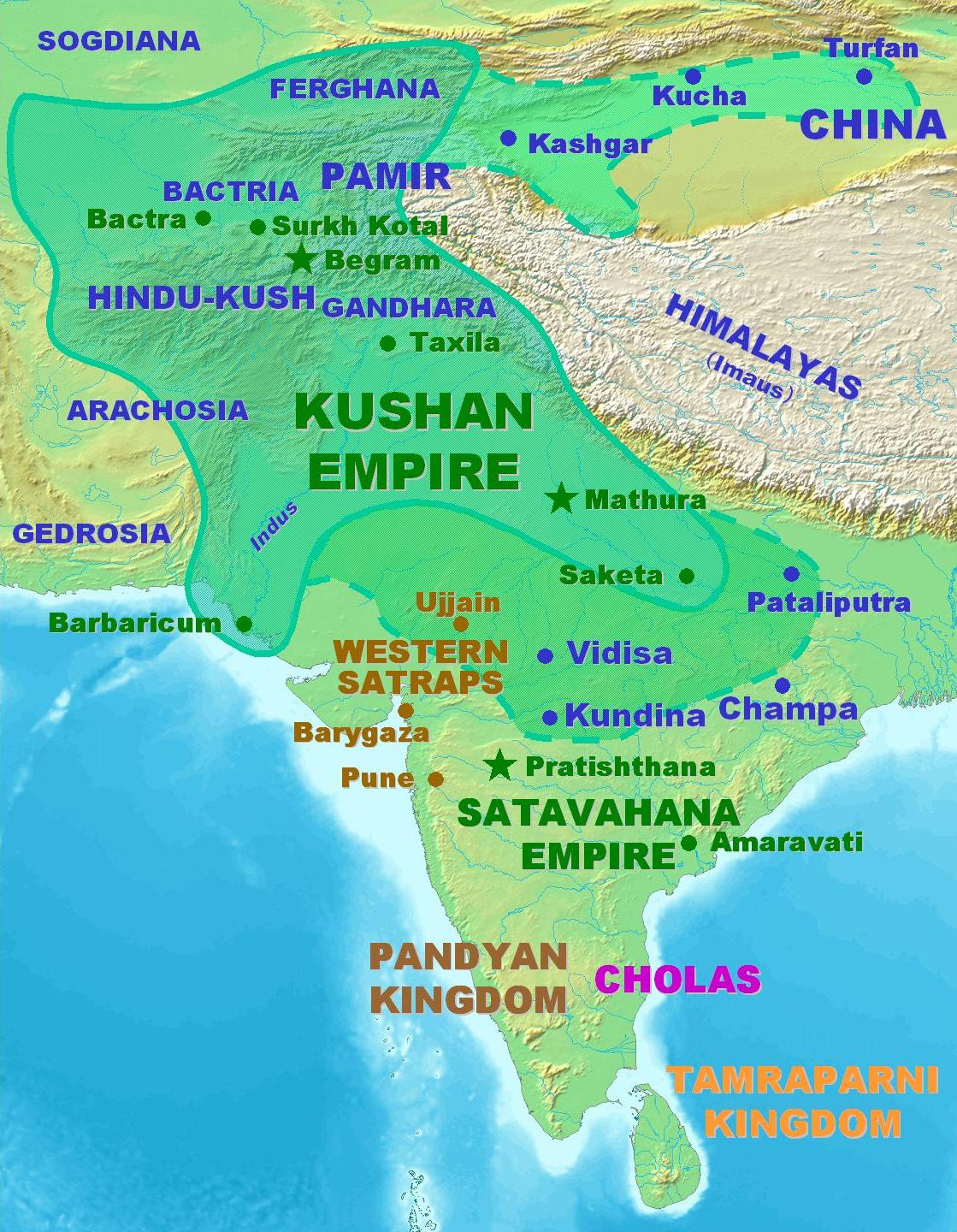
Kucha in the Kushan Empire under Kanishka the Great
