= Mamut (name) =

Mamut or Mamout may refer to the following notable people:

Given name

- Mamut Saine, Gambian footballer

Surname

- Alexander Mamut (born 1960), Russian businessman
- Eugene Mamut, Russian and American film special effects specialist and animator
- Ivan Mamut (born 1997), Croatian football forward
- Khalil Mamut, Uyghur refugee and ex-inmate of Guantanamo Bay
- Leandro Mamut (born 2003), Argentine football midfielder
- Musa Mamut (1931–1978), deported Crimean Tatar
- Qurban Mamut, Uyghur writer
- Yarrow Mamout (c. 1736–1823), Guinean entrepreneur
