= Streptomyces litoralis =

Scientific classification
- Domain: Bacteria
- Kingdom: Bacillati
- Phylum: Actinomycetota
- Class: Actinomycetia
- Order: Streptomycetales
- Family: Streptomycetaceae
- Genus: Streptomyces
- Species: S. litoralis

Binomial name
- Streptomyces litoralis Ma et al. 2016

Type strain
- CCTCC AA2015040, KCTC 39729, TRM 46515, TRM46515

Species of bacterium

Streptomyces litoralis is a bacterium species from the genus of Streptomyces which has been isolated from the beach of Awat in China.

== See also ==
- List of Streptomyces species
