= Mamut =

Mamut means mammoth in multiple European languages and may refer to:

- Mamut (name)
- Mamut Mine in Malaysia
- Mamutica, the largest building (by volume) in Zagreb and Croatia, as well as one of the largest apartment blocks in Europe
- "El Mamut Chiquitito", a song by the Argentinean–Venezuelan rock band Unos Panas Ahi
