= Eugene Mamut =

Soviet and American filmmaker

- Евгений Мамут
- Born: 9 July 1942 (age 83); Tashkent, Uzbek SSR, Soviet Union
- Citizenship: United States; Soviet Union (formerly)

Eugene Mamut (born Yevgeni Shamayevich Mamut; (Note: Alternatively Yevhen Shamayevych Mamut from Ukrainian: Євген Шамаєвич Мамут) Russian: Евгений Шамаевич Мамут; born 9 July 1942) is a Soviet and American film special effects specialist, animator, and Academy Award winner. He was awarded the Academy Scientific and Technical Award.

== Biography ==
Mamut was born on 9 July 1942 in Tashkent, Soviet Uzbekistan. His parents and sister emigrated to the United States in 1977, followed by Mamut's family one year late

From 1949 to 1959, Mamut attended secondary schools No. 95, No. 48, and No. 9 in Kharkiv. Between 1959 and 1961, he worked as a fourth-class lathe operator at the experimental plant of the Kharkiv Polytechnic Institute. From 1961 to 1963, he pursued studies at the Kharkiv Construction College, specialising as an electrical technician. Between 1963 and 1967, he served in the Soviet military with the Pacific Fleet on Russky Island, attaining the rank of Chief Petty Officer. From 1967 to 1970, he was affiliated with the Department of Dynamics and Strength of Machines (DPM) at KhPI, where he obtained two inventor's certificates from the Patent Office for an innovative method of measuring non-electrical quantities. In 1971, he was awarded a diploma in electrical engineering from KhPI. Between 1970 and 1978, he worked as an engineer at the KhPI film studio, where he developed a custom animation stand and pioneered techniques for microscopic cinematography.

== Personal life ==
In 1996, he married graphic artist and animation specialist Iryna Borisova.

== Work ==
The amateur film studio of the Kharkiv Polytechnic Institute began its creative activity in 1957, initially under the direction of Volodymyr Petrovych Zubara, and later, from 1965, under Arkadii Mykhailovych Faustov.

After graduating from the Polytechnic Institute, Mamut worked at the institute's film studio, which was equipped with professional-grade equipment. There, filmmakers from Kharkiv engaged in the creation of experimental animated films, fostering an environment of technical innovation and artistic exploration.

The animation stand used by Mamut and his colleagues was ingeniously constructed by repurposing an aerial photography device. Due to shortages in materials, the team had to travel to Moscow to acquire celluloid from the Soyuzmultfilm studio. It was on this repurposed equipment and with this scarce celluloid—originally intended for Fyodor Khitruk's celebrated Winnie-the-Pooh series—that the animated film Tum-Tum (1972) was created. The film was directed by Mamut and illustrated by artist Iryna Anatoliivna Borisova, who would later become his wife. Around this pioneering effort, a dedicated creative team formed at the Kharkiv studio, including A. Holubchyk, Ye. Malynov, A. Yarmoliuk, V. Stolbovyi, A. Gordeev, L. Peretiachenko, and Yu. Hantsevych.

In 1977, Mamut contributed to the creation of the animated film Rhinoceros, based on the poetry of Boris Zakhoder, which featured innovative batik inserts. The young team of animators, of which Mamut was a central figure, engaged not only in the production of classical animation but also in experimental approaches to the medium. Their work explored emerging techniques such as stereography and electronic animation, marking the studio as a site of both artistic experimentation and technical innovation in the late Soviet animation landscape.

== Experimental techniques ==
=== Stereoanimation ===
In 1973, at the Kharkiv Polytechnic film studio, Mamut and his colleagues produced Vanka-Vstanka, a stereographic puppet animation incorporating live-action performance and filmed in colour—recognized as the first artistic stereo animation in the USSR. The film was publicly presented in Kyiv using red-green anaglyph 3D glasses. Unlike holography, stereoscopic cinema remains a spectacle of flat but dual images—recorded and viewed separately for the right and left eyes. In this sense, even stereoscopic film maintains a two-dimensional image structure, but one specifically designed for binocular perception, thus enhancing spatial illusion without abandoning the plane of traditional cinematography.

=== Computer animation ===
The first artistic animated film in the USSR to incorporate segments of computer-generated animation was created by the Kharkiv Polytechnic collective. This pioneering work was made possible through the use of the first locally assembled computer capable of producing digital drawings, constructed by a skilled technician within the institute. This marked a significant milestone in Soviet animation, blending traditional artistic techniques with emerging digital technologies well ahead of their broader adoption.

In 1975, the idea emerged to create an artistic animated film incorporating segments of computer graphics. To realise this, the team employed the Intograf-2, a graphical interaction device developed by M. S. Bezrodnyi. Designed to operate in conjunction with a mainframe computer, the Intograf-2 enabled the real-time display of computational results in the form of technical drawings, graphs, and diagrams, while also allowing for on-screen editing of these images through a human–machine dialogue interface. This technological innovation led to the creation of the animated film The Computer is Drawing. An Elementary Truth, based on the poetry of Boris Zakhoder. The project stands as one of the earliest Soviet experiments in integrating computational technology into the artistic domain of animation.

== Move to United States ==
Mamut emigrated from Kharkiv to the United States in 1978. In the Soviet Union, particularly in his native Kharkiv, his departure was perceived through the lens of political defection, and he was branded a "traitor" and "enemy of the people". As a consequence, during the 1980s, his name was systematically removed from the credits of films produced by the KhPI film studio when these works were screened or distributed, effectively erasing his authorship from public record within the USSR.

Upon his arrival in New York, Mamut began working at EFX Unlimited, initially in a modest position cleaning film reels. Over time, however, his technical expertise and creative vision were recognised, and he was entrusted with the development of special effects for major Hollywood productions, including The Blue Lagoon (1980), directed by Randal Kleiser, and Xanadu (1980), directed by Robert Greenwald. These projects marked his transition from émigré technician to a contributor within the American film industry.

Subsequently, Mamut worked with R/Greenberg Associates, contributing to visual effects for a range of prominent films including Zelig (1983), Ladyhawke (1985), Dirty Dancing (1987), Ghost Dad (1990), Predator (1987), and Predator 2 (1990). From 1993 to 1995, he was employed at Jukson Rosebush Co in New York, where he specialised in 2D computer animation, further extending his influence in the evolving field of digital visual effects.

In 1996, Mamut relocated to Lenox, Massachusetts, where he began working with the visual effects company Mass.Illusion. During his time there, he contributed to the development of visual effects for major Hollywood productions, most notably Starship Troopers (1997) and The Matrix (1999). These films—particularly The Matrix—became landmarks in the history of cinematic visual effects, further cementing Mamut's reputation as a leading figure in the field.

Mamut's work in the American film industry occasionally required operating under strict confidentiality. For instance, director Woody Allen would deliver film negatives labelled only with vague designations such as "winter project" or "summer project", concealing the true identity of the film until its theatrical release. In such cases, even the visual effects team remained unaware of the final title or narrative context of the project they were contributing to—a testament to both the trust placed in Mamut's professionalism and the high level of discretion demanded in elite cinematic production environments.

== Special effects ==
Throughout his career, Mamut contributed to the development of special effects in both Soviet and American cinema. In the Soviet Union, he worked on Tum-Tum (1972), an animated film incorporating traditional cel techniques and batik, co-created with artist Iryna Borisova. He also developed Vanka-Vstanka (1973), recognised as the first artistic stereoscopic puppet animation in the USSR, combining three-dimensional visual effects with live-action footage. In 1975, he participated in the production of The Computer is Drawing. An Elementary Truth, among the earliest Soviet films to utilise computer-generated graphics, using the Intograf-2 system. After emigrating to the United States, Mamut was employed by EFX Unlimited, contributing to films such as The Blue Lagoon (1980) and Xanadu (1980). At R/Greenberg Associates, he worked on several commercial productions, including Zelig (1983), Ladyhawke (1985), Dirty Dancing (1987), Predator (1987), Ghost Dad (1990), and Predator 2 (1990). Between 1993 and 1995, he worked in 2D computer animation at Jukson Rosebush Co. in New York. In 1996, he joined the visual effects company Mass.Illusion in Lenox, Massachusetts, where he contributed to Starship Troopers (1997) and The Matrix (1999). In some cases, such as during collaborations with director Woody Allen, he worked under conditions of confidentiality, with film reels delivered under generic titles and the final identity of the project disclosed only at the time of release. His career spanned a period of significant technological transition in cinematic visual effects, ranging from analogue and experimental animation to large-scale digital production.

== Awards ==
In 1962, Mamut was awarded the Silver Medal of the VDNKh (Exhibition of Achievements of the National Economy) in Moscow for a functioning model of a power station equipped with controllable circuit breakers. In 1982, he received a Clio Award for his work on a commercial for Timex watches. In 1987, Mamut, together with three colleagues, was honoured with a Scientific and Engineering Award from the Academy of Motion Picture Arts and Sciences for the design and development of the RGA/Oxberry Compu-Quad Special Effects Optical Printer, used in the production of the film Predator.

== Animagic ==
In 2002, in the resort town of Lenox, located in Berkshire County, Massachusetts, Mamut, and Iryna Borisova founded a private institution: the Animagic – Museum of Animation, Special Effects and Art, later based in Lee, Massachusetts. The museum is dedicated to the history and practice of animation and visual effects.

== Works ==
The selected filmography of Mamut is as follows:

=== Authorial and Experimental Works (USSR) ===
- Tum-Tum (1972) – Animated short film (cel animation and batik)
- Vanka-Vstanka (1973) – Stereoscopic puppet animation, combining 3D effects with live-action performance
- Azbuchnaya istina (An Elementary Truth, 1975) – Computer-assisted animation, one of the first of its kind in the USSR
- Nosorog (Rhinoceros, 1978) – Animated film with batik inserts based on the poetry of Boris Zakhoder

=== Visual Effects and Optical Compositing (US) ===
- The Blue Lagoon (1980) – Optical cameraman
- Xanadu (1980) – Optical cameraman
- Zelig (1983) – Optical cameraman
- Weird Science (1985) – Optical cameraman
- Ladyhawke (1985) – Optical effects
- Predator (1986) – Optical cameraman; contributed to effects that later received an Academy Scientific and Engineering Award
- Dirty Dancing (1987) – Optical cameraman
- New York Stories (1989) – Optical cameraman
- Little Monsters (1989) – Optical cameraman
- Predator 2 (1990) – Supervisor, optical camouflage effects
- Ghost Dad (1990) – Optical cameraman
- Starship Troopers (1997) – Digital compositor (Mass.Illusion)
- What Dreams May Come (1998) – Digital compositor
- The Matrix (1999) – Digital compositor

=== Multimedia and Digital Projects ===
- Ocean Voyager (1995) – Educational CD-ROM game; production designer
- The War in Vietnam (1995) – Interactive digital archive including maps, articles from The New York Times, and CBS newsreels
- Eric Kroll: Fetish (1994) – Digital image catalogue
- Look What I See (1996) – Educational DVD produced for the Metropolitan Museum of Art

== Litaruture ==
- Myslavskyi, V. N. Kinematograficheskaia istoriia Kharkova, 1896–2010: Imena, fil'my, sobytiia. Kharkiv: 2011.
- Chapai, V. Dvorets studentov KhPI. 50 let. Dom, gde zazhigaiutsia serdtsa. Kharkiv: ASSA, 2013. 256 pp.
- Archive record: Ustroistvo graficheskogo vzaimodeistviia, original archived on 11 August 2014, cited 2 August 2014.
- Archive record: Amerikanskaia mechta pensionera Iudzhina. "Shvartsenegger trias mne ruku, khlopal po plechu i utverzhal, chto ia — 'papa Khishchnika'", original archived on 8 August 2014, cited 2 August 2014.
