= Xinhe County, Xinjiang =

Xinhe County توقسۇ ناھىيىسى (Uyghur) 新和县 (Chinese) Toksu, Hsin-ho
- County
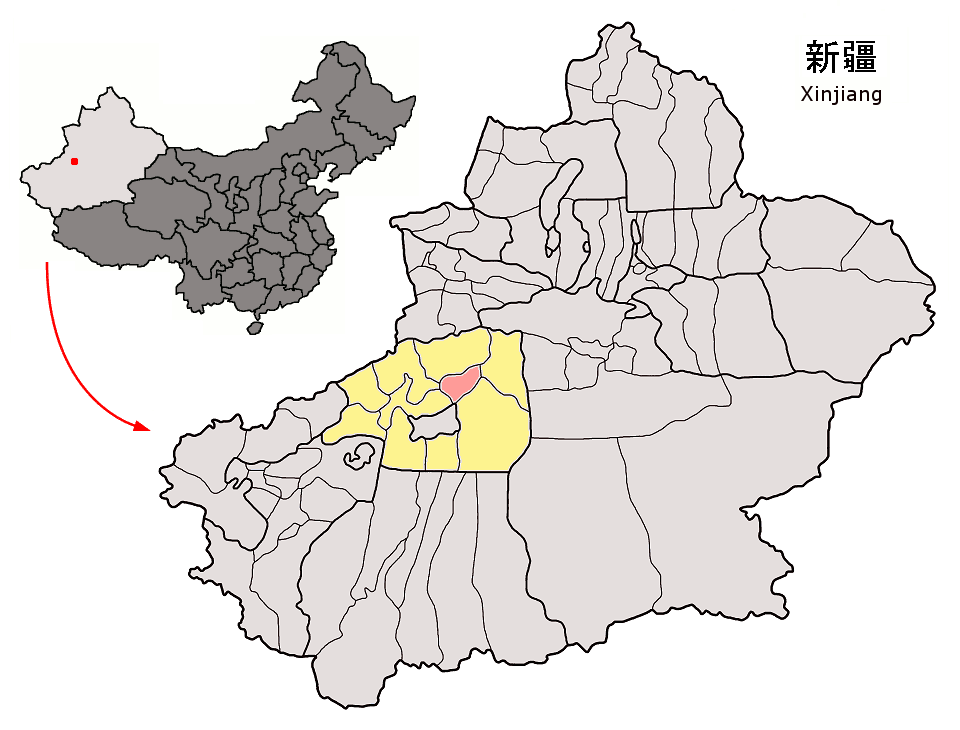
- Location of Toksu County (red) within Aksu Prefecture (yellow) and Xinjiang

- Location of the seat Xinhe County (China)
- Coordinates: 41°33′01″N 82°37′00″E
- Country: China
- Autonomous region: Xinjiang
- Prefecture: Aksu
- County seat: Toksu Town (Xinhe)

Area
  - Total: 5,820.46 km^{2} (2,247.29 sq mi)

Population (2020)
  - Total: 194,473
  - Density: 33.4120/km^{2} (86.5366/sq mi)

Ethnic groups
  - Major ethnic groups: Uyghur
- Time zone: UTC+8 (China Standard (Note: Locals in Xinjiang frequently observe UTC+6 (Xinjiang Time), 2 hours behind Beijing.))
- Website: xjxinhe.gov.cn (in Chinese)

Xinhe County, Xinjiang

Uyghur name
- Uyghur: توقسۇ ناھىيىسى
Transcriptions
- Latin Yëziqi: Toqsu Nahiyisi
- Yengi Yeziⱪ: Toⱪsu Naⱨiyisi
- SASM/GNC: Toksu Nahiyisi
- Siril Yëziqi: Тоқсу Наһийиси

Chinese name
- Simplified Chinese: 新和县
- Traditional Chinese: 新和縣
Transcriptions
Standard Mandarin
- Hanyu Pinyin: Xīnhé Xiàn
- Wade–Giles: Hsin¹-ho² Hsien⁴

Alternative Chinese name
- Simplified Chinese: 托克苏县
- Traditional Chinese: 托克蘇縣
Transcriptions
Standard Mandarin
- Hanyu Pinyin: Tuōkèsū Xiàn

Xinhe County (Chinese: 新和县) as the official romanized name, also formerly known as its Uyghur name Toksu County (Uyghur: توقسۇ ناھىيىسى; Chinese: 托克苏县), is a county in Aksu Prefecture, Xinjiang Uyghur Autonomous Region, China.

== Name ==
The county's original name Toksu was changed into Xinhe in 1941. "Xinhe" is the abbreviation of "Xinjiang Heping" (新疆和平), literally "Xinjiang Peace."

== History ==
On October 27, 1930, Toksu County was created from part of Kuqa.

In 1941 or 1944, Toksu County's Chinese character name was changed from 'Tuokesu' County (托克蘇縣) to 'Xinhe' County (新和縣).

== Administrative divisions ==
Xinhe County administered 4 towns, 4 townships and 4 other areas:

Name	Simplified Chinese	Hanyu Pinyin	Uyghur (UEY)	Uyghur Latin (ULY)	Administrative division code	Notes
Towns
Toksu Town (Xinhe Town)	新和镇	Xīnhé Zhèn	توقسۇ بازىرى	toqsu baziri	652925100	
Yultuzbaġ Town	尤鲁都斯巴格镇	Yóulǔdūsībāgé Zhèn	يۇلتۇزباغ بازىرى	yultuzbagh baziri	652925101	formerly Yultuzbaġ Township (尤鲁都斯巴格乡)
Icheriq Town	依其艾日克镇	Yīqí'àirìkè Zhèn	ئىچئېرىق بازىرى	Ich'ëriq baziri	652925102	formerly Icheriq Township (依其艾日克乡)
Tasheriq Town	塔什艾日克镇	Tǎshí'àirìkè Zhèn	تاشئېرىق بازىرى	tash'ëriq baziri	652925103	formerly Tasheriq Township (تاشئېرىق يېزىسى / 塔什艾日克乡)
Payxambabazar Town	排先拜巴扎镇	Páixiānbàibāzhā Zhèn	پەيشەنبەبازار بازىرى	peyshenbebazar baziri	652925104	formerly Payxambabazar Township (پەيشەنبەبازار يېزىسى / 排先拜巴扎乡)
Üchqat Town	玉奇喀特镇	Yùqíkātè Zhèn	ئۈچقات بازىرى	Üchqat baziri	652925105	formerly Üchqat Township (ئۈچقات يېزىسى / 玉奇喀特乡)
Townships
Ogen Township	渭干乡	Wèigàn Xiāng	ئۆگەن يېزىسى	Ögen yëzisi	652925203	
Tamtoghraq Township	塔木托格拉克乡	Tǎmùtuōgélākè Xiāng	تامتوغراق يېزىسى	tamtoghraq yëzisi	652925205	

== Climate ==
Climate data for Xinhe, elevation 1,010 m (3,310 ft), (1991–2020 normals, extremes 1981–2010)
Month	Jan	Feb	Mar	Apr	May	Jun	Jul	Aug	Sep	Oct	Nov	Dec	Year
Record high °C (°F)	7.5 (45.5)	14.7 (58.5)	25.5 (77.9)	34.7 (94.5)	35.5 (95.9)	37.7 (99.9)	40.5 (104.9)	38.6 (101.5)	35.7 (96.3)	29.8 (85.6)	21.2 (70.2)	9.9 (49.8)	40.5 (104.9)
Mean daily maximum °C (°F)	−1.0 (30.2)	5.9 (42.6)	14.6 (58.3)	22.8 (73.0)	27.5 (81.5)	31.0 (87.8)	32.3 (90.1)	31.0 (87.8)	26.7 (80.1)	19.9 (67.8)	10.3 (50.5)	0.8 (33.4)	18.5 (65.3)
Daily mean °C (°F)	−7.4 (18.7)	−0.8 (30.6)	7.9 (46.2)	15.9 (60.6)	20.5 (68.9)	24 (75)	25.2 (77.4)	23.9 (75.0)	19.1 (66.4)	11.2 (52.2)	2.6 (36.7)	−5.0 (23.0)	11.4 (52.6)
Mean daily minimum °C (°F)	−12.7 (9.1)	−6.6 (20.1)	1.6 (34.9)	9.3 (48.7)	13.8 (56.8)	17.3 (63.1)	18.8 (65.8)	17.6 (63.7)	12.4 (54.3)	4.6 (40.3)	−2.8 (27.0)	−9.3 (15.3)	5.3 (41.6)
Record low °C (°F)	−24.0 (−11.2)	−24.2 (−11.6)	−10.9 (12.4)	−1.7 (28.9)	1.4 (34.5)	6.7 (44.1)	10.6 (51.1)	8.1 (46.6)	3.6 (38.5)	−4.7 (23.5)	−14.1 (6.6)	−23.6 (−10.5)	−24.2 (−11.6)
Average precipitation mm (inches)	2.0 (0.08)	2.8 (0.11)	1.4 (0.06)	2.7 (0.11)	8.2 (0.32)	16.8 (0.66)	13.3 (0.52)	11.2 (0.44)	7.1 (0.28)	3.5 (0.14)	3.0 (0.12)	1.7 (0.07)	73.7 (2.91)
Average precipitation days (≥ 0.1 mm)	2.8	1.7	0.9	1.5	2.8	6.3	7.3	6.0	3.4	1.2	1.2	2.4	37.5
Average snowy days	5.1	2.0	0.4	0.2	0	0	0	0	0	0	1.2	4.8	13.7
Average relative humidity (%)	70	59	45	38	39	44	49	53	57	60	64	73	54
Mean monthly sunshine hours	177.6	193.4	225.5	247.5	288.0	296.5	301.9	287.1	263.5	255.5	201.2	163.4	2,901.1
Percentage possible sunshine	59	63	60	61	64	65	66	68	72	76	69	58	65
Source: China Meteorological Administration

== Economy ==
The economy is based on agriculture and also animal husbandry. The county produces wheat, corn, rice, cotton and melons as well as Parthian fennel and thin-shelled walnuts. Industries include wool-spinning, knitting, and carpet making.

== Demographics ==
Historical population
Year	Pop.	±% p.a.
2000	139,806	—
2010	172,064	+2.10%

As of 2015, 184,399 of the 195,920 residents of the county were Uyghur, 10,901 were Han Chinese and 620 were from other ethnic groups.

According to the 2002 census, it has a population of 140,000.

As of 1999, 95.01% of the population of the county were Uyghur and 4.81% of the population was Han Chinese.

== Transportation ==
Xinhe is served by the Southern Xinjiang Railway.

== Historical maps ==
Historical English-language maps including Toksu/Xinhe:

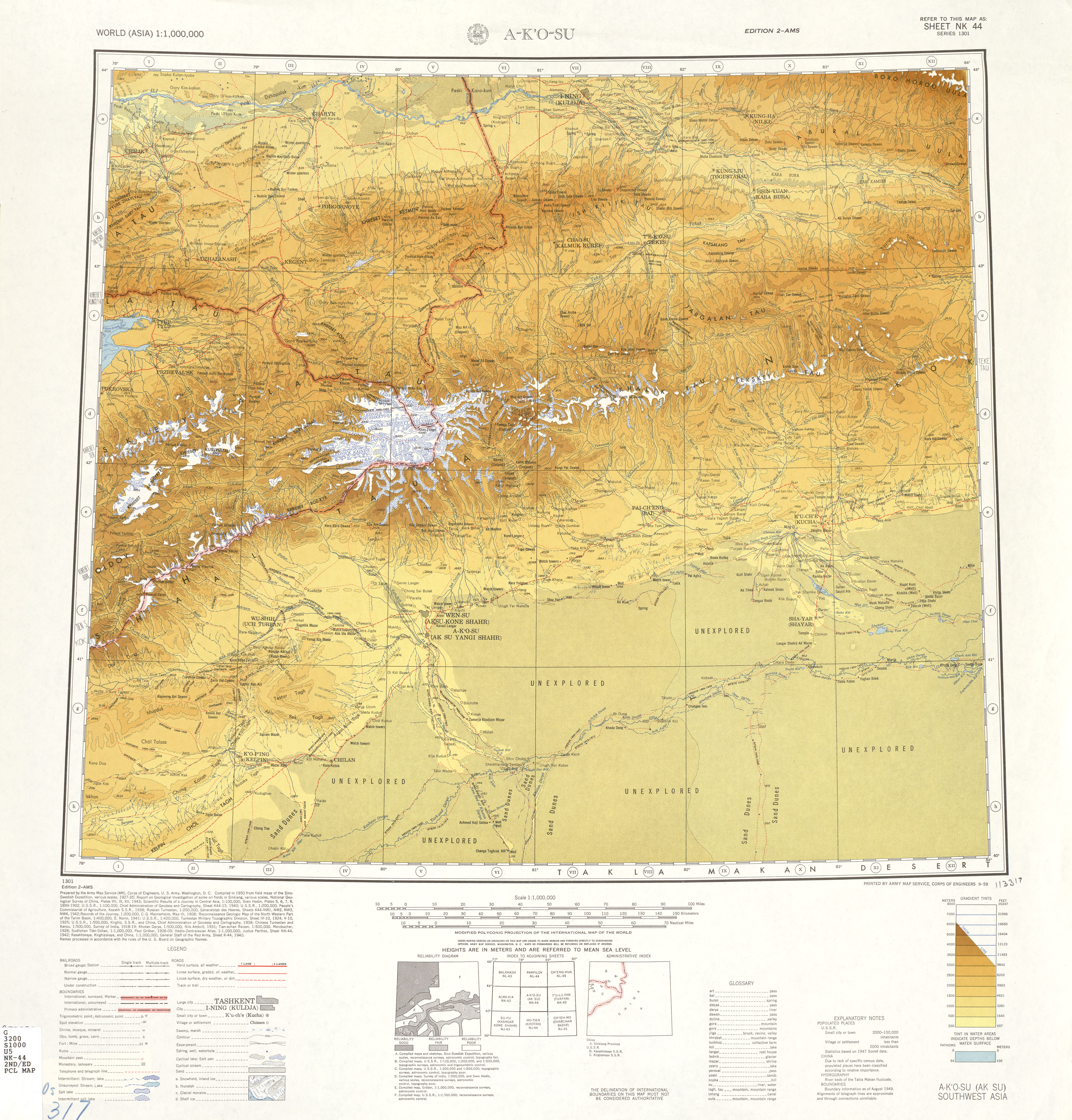
Map including Hsin-ho (Torpak Bazar) and surrounding region from the International Map of the World (AMS, 1950) (Note: From map: "THE DELINEATION OF INTERNATIONAL BOUNDARIES ON THIS MAP MUST NOT BE CONSIDERED AUTHORITATIVE")

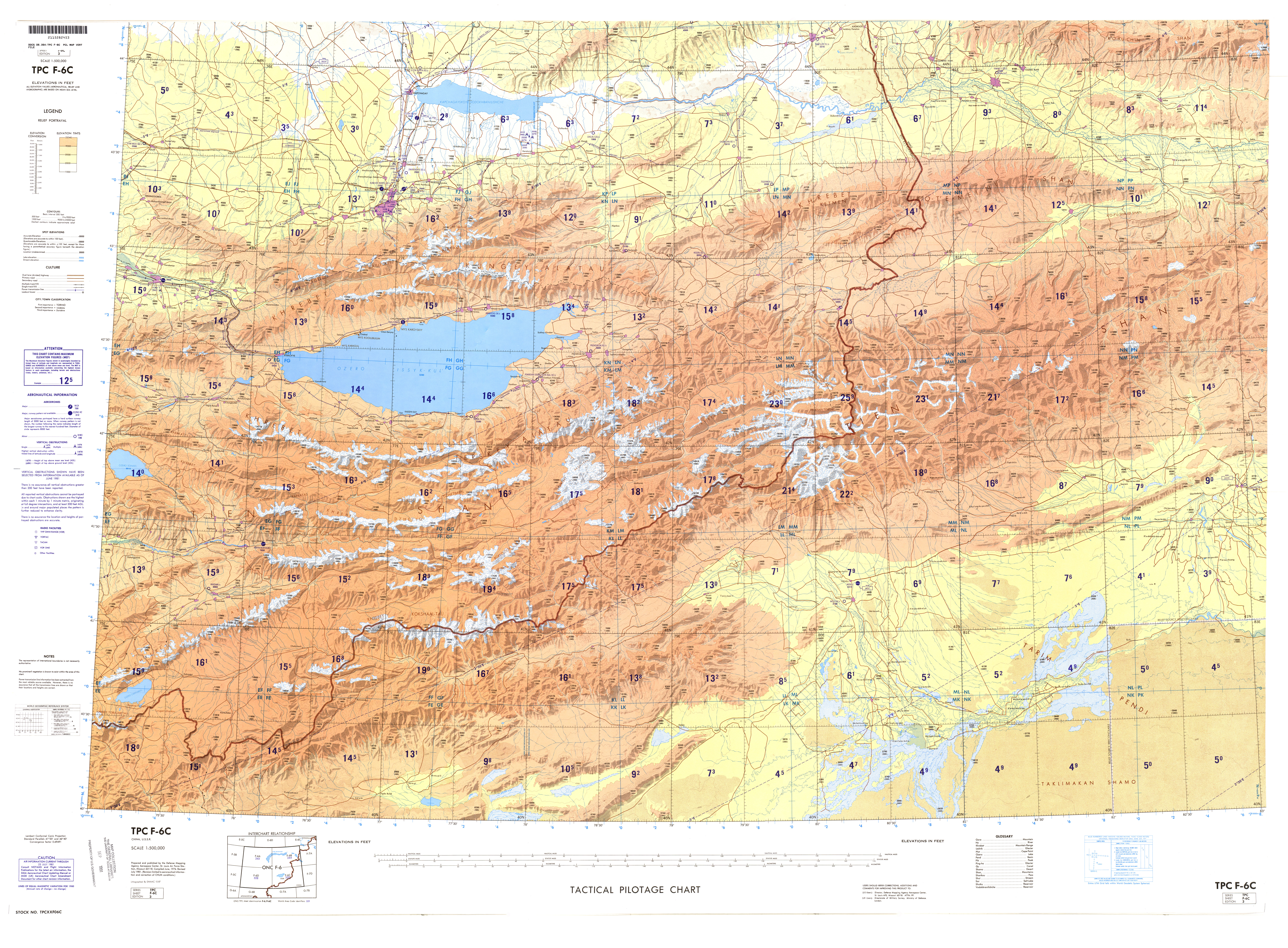
Map including Xinhe (DMA, 1981)

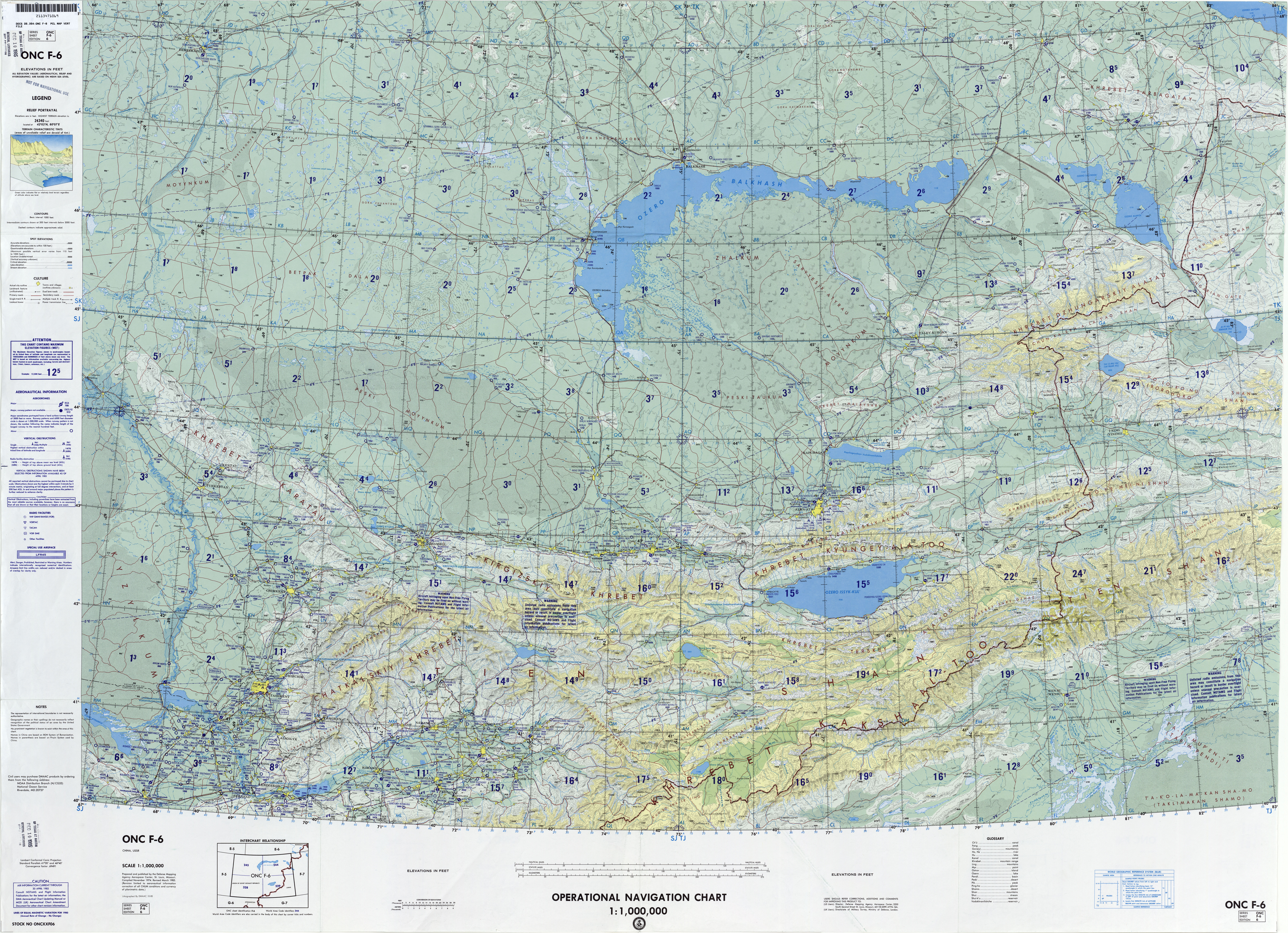
From the Operational Navigation Chart; map including Hsin-ho (Toksu) (DMA, 1985) (Note: From map: "The representation of international boundaries is not necessarily authoritative.")
