= Awat County =

Awat County ئاۋات ناھىيىسى (Uyghur) 阿瓦提县 (Chinese) Awati
- County
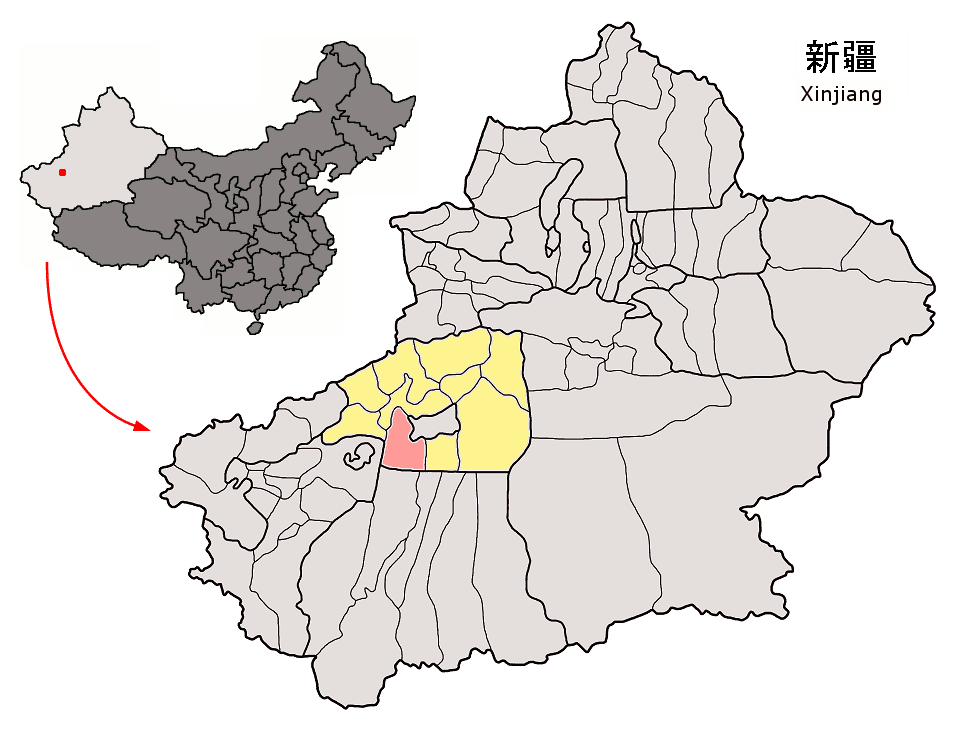
- Location of the county in Aksu Prefecture (yellow) and Xinjiang

- Location of the seat in Xinjiang Awat (China)
- Country: China
- Autonomous region: Xinjiang
- Prefecture: Aksu
- County seat: Awat Town
- Township-level divisions: 5 towns, 3 townships

Area
  - Total: 13,017.89 km^{2} (5,026.24 sq mi)

Population (2020)
  - Total: 242,481
  - Density: 18.6268/km^{2} (48.2431/sq mi)

Ethnic groups
  - Major ethnic groups: Uyghur, Han Chinese
- Time zone: UTC+8 (China Standard (Note: Locals in Xinjiang frequently observe UTC+6 (Xinjiang Time), 2 hours behind Beijing.))
- Postal code: 843200
- Website: www.xjawt.gov.cn (in Chinese)

Awat County

Uyghur name
- Uyghur: ئاۋات ناھىيىسى
Transcriptions
- Latin Yëziqi: Awat Nahiyisi
- Yengi Yeziⱪ: Avat Naⱨiyisi
- SASM/GNC: Awat Nahiyisi
- Siril Yëziqi: Ават Наһийиси

Chinese name
- Simplified Chinese: 阿瓦提县
- Traditional Chinese: 阿瓦提縣
Transcriptions
Standard Mandarin
- Hanyu Pinyin: Āwǎtí Xiàn
- Wade–Giles: A¹-wa³-tʻi² Hsien⁴

Awat County (Uyghur: ئاۋات ناھىيىسى) is a county in Aksu Prefecture, Xinjiang Uyghur Autonomous Region, China. Awat County is located on the southern foot of the Tian Shan mountain range and on the northern edge of the Taklamakan Desert.

== History ==
The term "Awat" translates from Uyghur to signify "prosperity". The region surrounding Awat County was formerly known as "Dolang," the ancestral home of the "Dolang people," an old Uyghur tribe. Subsequently, a significant influx of peasants settled in the region, resulting in a population surge, an expansion of cultivated land, and a daily transformation of the landscape, prompting the renaming to Awat.

During the Han dynasty, it was part of Gumo. During the Tang dynasty, it was part of Gumo Prefecture. In 1883, Aksu Dao was established, with Awat falling under its control. In 1913, the area was part of the three, four, and five districts of Aksu County; in 1922, Awat County was established. Awat County was established in 1930, initially part of Aksu Dao, and subsequently became part of the Aksu District Administrator's Office in 1933. In 1943, it pertains to the Aksu Administrative Inspector General's Office. The People's Government of the County of Awat was officially created in 1950. Subsequently, it has been governed by the Aksu Commissioner's Office and the Aksu Regional Administrative Office.

On January 23, 2013, the People's Government of Xinjiang Uygur Autonomous Region (Xin Zheng Xin [2013] No. 17) sanctioned the transfer of 474.208 square kilometers of Awat County to Aral City's administration.

== Administrative divisions ==
Awat County is made up of seven towns, two townships and one other area:

Name	Simplified Chinese	Hanyu Pinyin	Uyghur (UEY)	Uyghur Latin (ULY)	Administrative division code	Notes
Towns
Awat Town	阿瓦提镇	Āwǎtí Zhèn	ئاۋات بازىرى	Awat baziri	652928100	
Ghoruchol Town	乌鲁却勒镇	Wūlǔquèlè Zhèn	غورۇچۆل بازىرى	ghoruchöl baziri	652928101	formerly Ghoruchol Township (乌鲁却勒乡)
Besheriq Town	拜什艾日克镇	Bàishí'àirìkè Zhèn	بەشئېرىق بازىرى	besh'ëriq baziri	652928102	formerly Besheriq Township (拜什艾日克乡)
Tamtoghraq Town	塔木托格拉克镇	Tǎmùtuōgélākè Zhèn	تامتوغراق بازىرى	tamtoghraq baziri	652928103	formerly Tamtoghraq Township (تامتوغراق يېزىسى / 塔木托格拉克乡)
Yengierik Town	英艾日克镇	Yīng'àirìkè Zhèn	يېڭىئېرىق بازىرى	yëngi'ëriq baziri	652928104	formerly Yengierik Township (يېڭىئېرىق يېزىسى / 英艾日克乡)
Aybagh Town	阿依巴格镇	Āyībāgé Zhèn	ئايباغ بازىرى	Aybagh baziri	652928105	formerly Aybagh Township (ئايباغ يېزىسى / 阿依巴格乡)
Sanhe Town	三河镇	Sānhé Zhèn	سەنخې بازىرى	senxë baziri	652928106	Established on 30 December 2020
Townships
Dolan Township	多浪乡	Duōlàng Xiāng	دولان يېزىسى	dolan yëzisi	652928203	
Baytoghraq Township	巴格托格拉克乡	Bāgétuōgélākè Xiāng	بايتوغراق يېزىسى	baytoghraq yëzisi	652928204	

== Demographics ==
Historical population
Year	Pop.	±% p.a.
2000	209,654	—
2010	237,562	+1.26%

As of 1999, 81.59% of the population of Awat (Awati) County was Uyghur and 17.74% of the population was Han Chinese.

According to the 2010 Sixth Population Census, the total resident population of Awati County was 237,562. As of 2015, 217,722 of the 262,842 residents of the county were Uyghur, 42,960 were Han Chinese, 2,160 were from other ethnic groups.

== Climate ==
Climate data for Awat, elevation 1,044 m (3,425 ft), (1991–2020 normals, extremes 1981–present)
Month	Jan	Feb	Mar	Apr	May	Jun	Jul	Aug	Sep	Oct	Nov	Dec	Year
Record high °C (°F)	8.2 (46.8)	14.6 (58.3)	27.8 (82.0)	35.6 (96.1)	36.2 (97.2)	38.3 (100.9)	40.1 (104.2)	39.2 (102.6)	34.1 (93.4)	30.9 (87.6)	22.1 (71.8)	10.9 (51.6)	40.1 (104.2)
Mean daily maximum °C (°F)	−0.5 (31.1)	5.9 (42.6)	15.0 (59.0)	23.5 (74.3)	28.0 (82.4)	31.0 (87.8)	32.0 (89.6)	30.8 (87.4)	27.0 (80.6)	20.4 (68.7)	10.5 (50.9)	1.3 (34.3)	18.7 (65.7)
Daily mean °C (°F)	−7.4 (18.7)	−1.2 (29.8)	7.7 (45.9)	15.8 (60.4)	20.3 (68.5)	23.2 (73.8)	24.3 (75.7)	23.1 (73.6)	18.5 (65.3)	10.7 (51.3)	2.0 (35.6)	−5.1 (22.8)	11.0 (51.8)
Mean daily minimum °C (°F)	−13.1 (8.4)	−7.3 (18.9)	1.1 (34.0)	8.5 (47.3)	13.1 (55.6)	16.2 (61.2)	17.6 (63.7)	16.6 (61.9)	11.5 (52.7)	3.4 (38.1)	−3.8 (25.2)	−9.7 (14.5)	4.5 (40.1)
Record low °C (°F)	−26.0 (−14.8)	−25.0 (−13.0)	−12.1 (10.2)	−3.0 (26.6)	2.2 (36.0)	7.4 (45.3)	8.2 (46.8)	8.0 (46.4)	3.3 (37.9)	−5.5 (22.1)	−14.1 (6.6)	−21.9 (−7.4)	−26.0 (−14.8)
Average precipitation mm (inches)	1.0 (0.04)	1.7 (0.07)	1.6 (0.06)	2.5 (0.10)	9.1 (0.36)	16.6 (0.65)	14.8 (0.58)	12.6 (0.50)	9.3 (0.37)	2.5 (0.10)	1.0 (0.04)	1.1 (0.04)	73.8 (2.91)
Average precipitation days (≥ 0.1 mm)	1.7	1.1	0.7	1.3	3.2	6.2	6.7	5.7	3.3	1.3	0.7	1.5	33.4
Average snowy days	5.0	2.4	0.3	0.1	0	0	0	0	0	0.1	0.7	4.9	13.5
Average relative humidity (%)	69	60	47	39	42	50	56	59	62	63	66	74	57
Mean monthly sunshine hours	182.9	184.5	206.5	230.1	271.1	297.4	309.1	285.2	261.6	258.2	206.0	168.9	2,861.5
Percentage possible sunshine	61	60	55	57	60	66	68	68	71	77	71	59	64
Source: China Meteorological Administrationall-time extreme temperatureall-time October record

== Economy ==
A developed irrigation system is in place and agricultural products include wheat, rice, corn and cotton. Sheep are the primary livestock in the county. Industries include coal, construction, food processing, leathermaking and carpetmaking.

One quarter of the cotton production in Aksu prefecture comes from the county.

== Historical maps ==
Historical English-language maps including Awat:

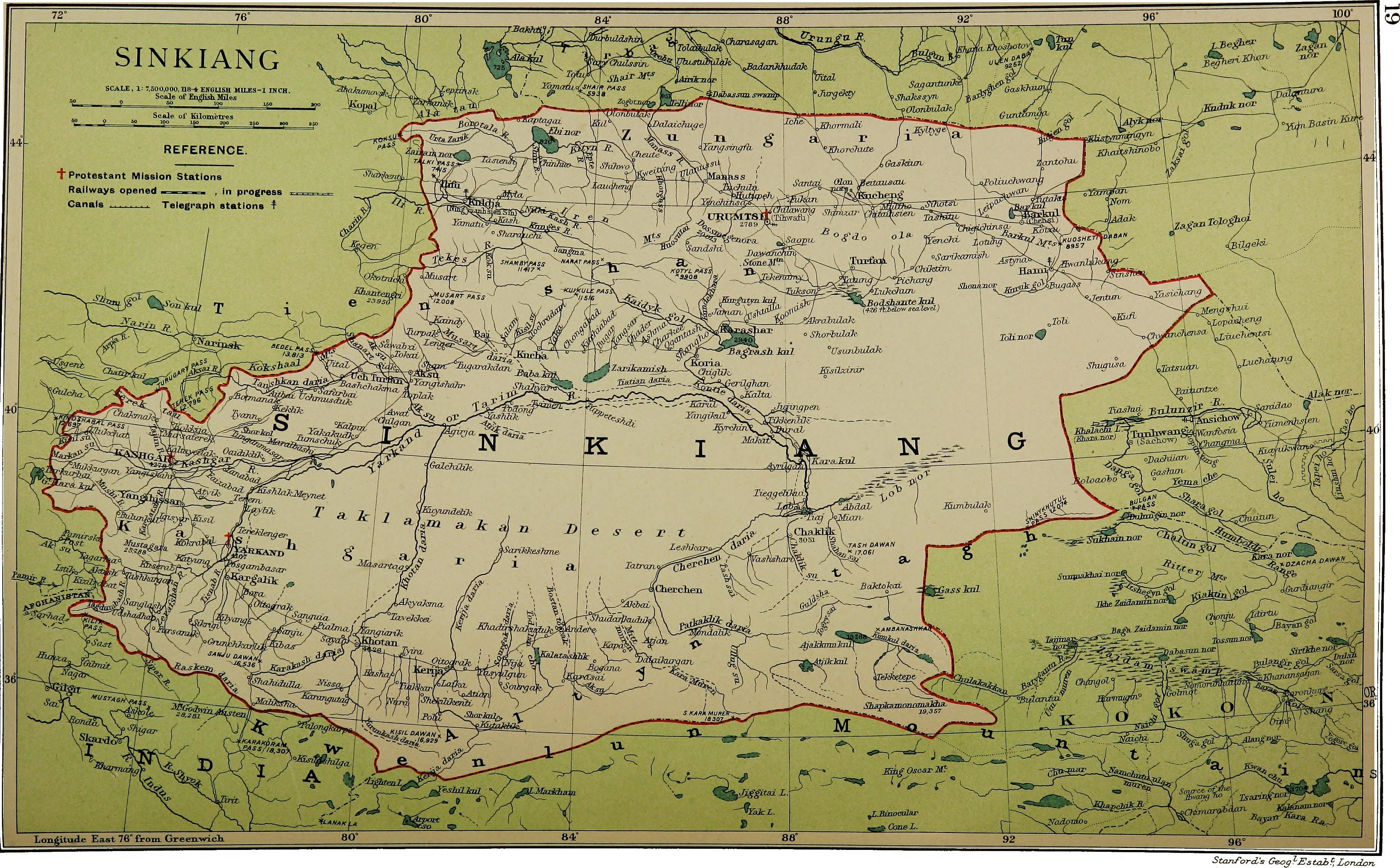
Map including Awat (1917)

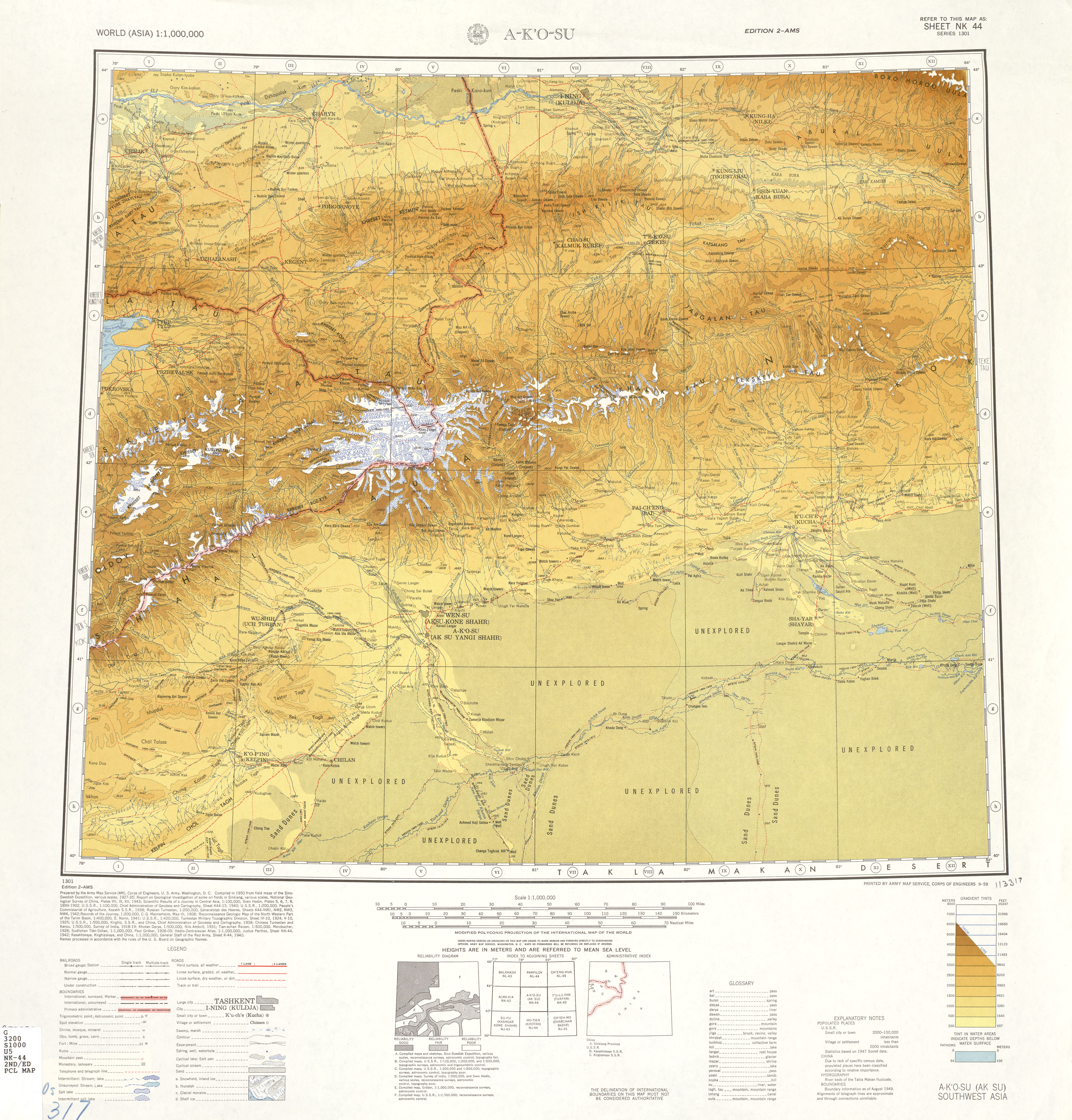
Map including Awat (labeled as A-wa-t'i (Abad)) and surrounding region from the International Map of the World (AMS, 1950) (Note: From map: "THE DELINEATION OF INTERNATIONAL BOUNDARIES ON THIS MAP MUST NOT BE CONSIDERED AUTHORITATIVE")

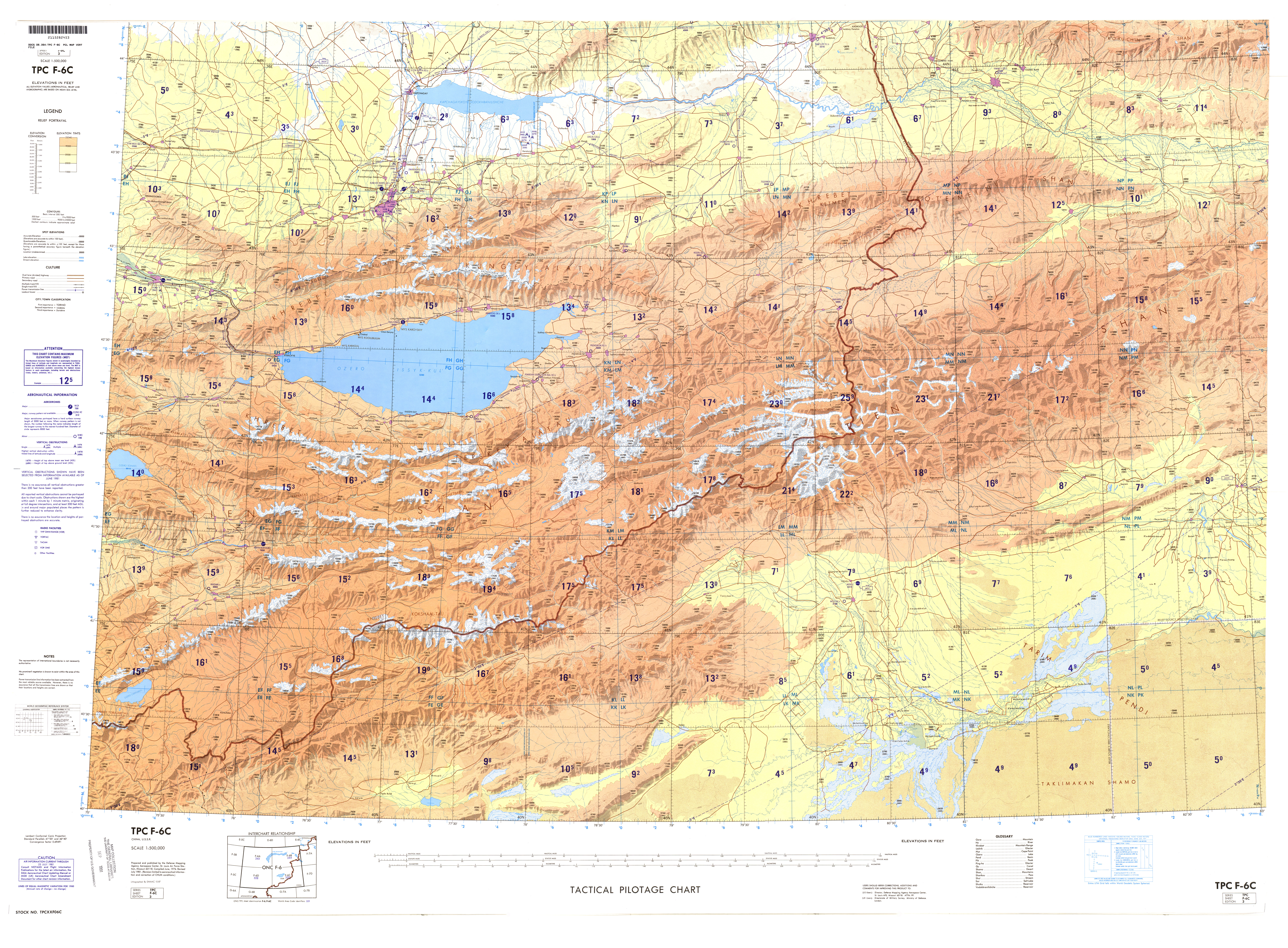
Map including Awat (DMA, 1981)

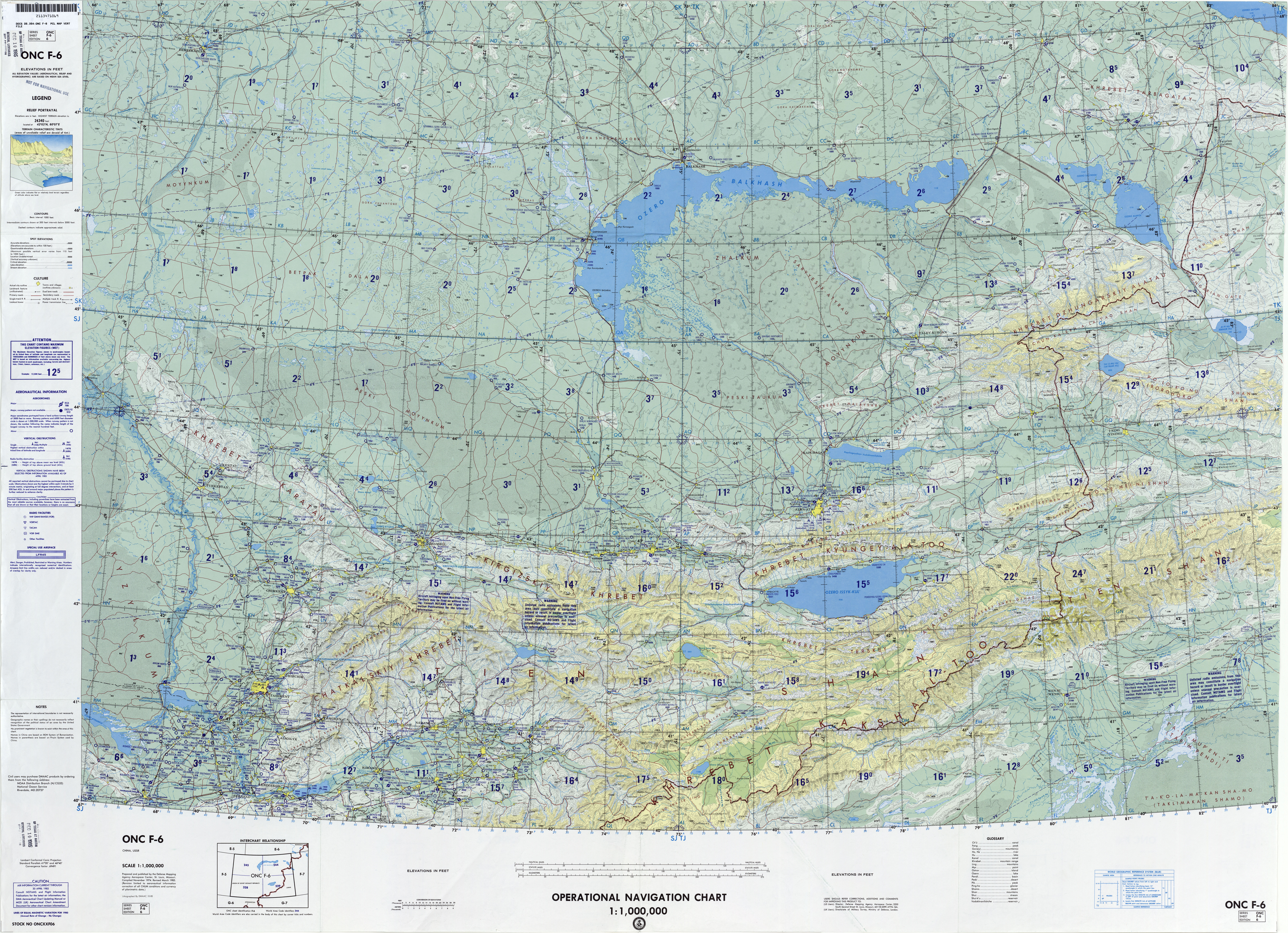
From the Operational Navigation Chart; map including Awat (labeled as A-wa-t'i (Awat)) (DMA, 1985) (Note: From map: "The representation of international boundaries is not necessarily authoritative.")
