= Aksu Prefecture =

Prefecture of Xinjiang, China

Aksu Prefecture: 阿克苏地区 (Chinese); ئاقسۇ ۋىلايىتى (Uyghur)
- Prefecture
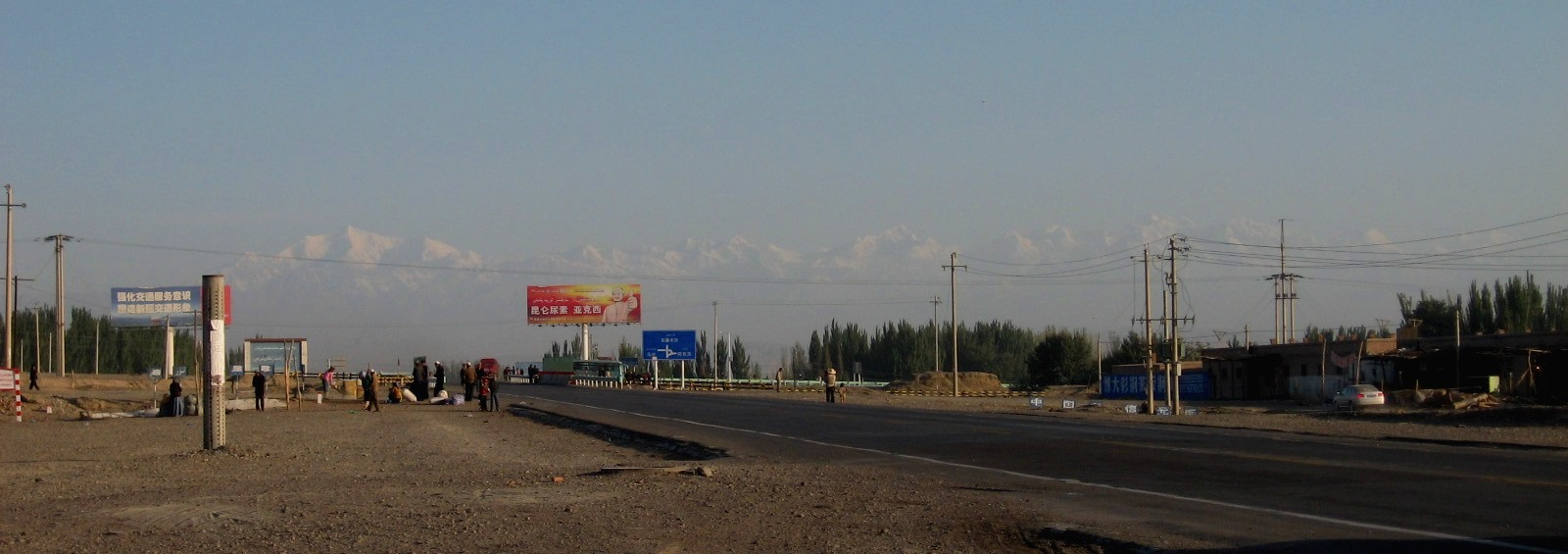
- Outside of Aksu City with Tian Shan range in the background

- Aksu Prefecture (red) in Xinjiang (orange)
- Coordinates (Aksu City government): 41.18°N 80.29°E
- Country: China
- Province: Xinjiang
- County-level divisions: 8
- Seat: Aksu City

Area
  - Prefecture: 127,817 km^{2} (49,350 sq mi)
  - Urban: 14,415 km^{2} (5,566 sq mi)
- Elevation: 1,519 m (4,984 ft)

Population (2020 Census)
  - Prefecture: 2,714,422
  - Density: 21.2368/km^{2} (55.0030/sq mi)

GDP
  - Prefecture: CN¥ 156.4 billion US$ 24.3 billion
  - Per capita: CN¥ 56,892; US$ 8,820
- Time zone: UTC+8 (China Standard)
- Postal code: 843000
- Area code: 997
- ISO 3166 code: CN-XJ-29
- License Plate: 新N
- Website: www.aksu.gov.cn

Aksu Prefecture

Chinese name
- Simplified Chinese: 阿克苏地区
- Traditional Chinese: 阿克蘇地區
Transcriptions
Standard Mandarin
- Hanyu Pinyin: Ākèsū Dìqū
- Wade–Giles: A¹-kʻo⁴-su¹ Ti⁴-chʻü¹
- IPA: [á.kʰɤ̂.sú.tî.tɕʰý]
other Mandarin
- Xiao'erjing: اَکْ‌سُ دِکِیُوِ

Uyghur name
- Uyghur: ئاقسۇ ۋىلايىتى
Transcriptions
- Latin Yëziqi: Aqsu Wilayiti
- Yengi Yeziⱪ: Aⱪsu Vilayiti
- SASM/GNC: Ak̂su Vilayiti
- Siril Yëziqi: Ақсу Вилайити

Aksu Prefecture is located in west-central Xinjiang, China. It has an area of 131,161 km^{2} (50,642 sq mi) and 2.714 million inhabitants at the 2020 census whom 715,319 lived in the built-up (or metro) area made up of Aksu urban district. The name Aksu is Turkic for 'white water'. Aksu Prefecture has a 263.8 km (163.9 mi) long international boundary with Kyrgyzstan and Kazakhstan.

== Etymology ==
The name Aksu comes from the name of the Aksu River which is Turkic for 'white water'. The name is similar to that of the nearby Zhetysu region which means 'seven rivers'. The name of Aksu Prefecture's Onsu County (Wensu) means 'ten water' in Uyghur and other Turkic languages, and Kizilsu in Kizilsu Kyrgyz Autonomous Prefecture means 'red water'—all of these names consist of a descriptor followed by su ('river'; 'water').

== History ==
In 717 AD, the Arabs, guided by their Turgesh allies, besieged Buat-ɦuɑn (撥換, roughly modern Aksu) and Dai-dʑiᴇk-dʑiᴇŋ (大石城, roughly modern Uqturpan) in the Battle of Aksu. On August 15, the Arabs, Tibetan Empire, and Suluk Khan of the Türgesh Khaganate formed an alliance to besiege the city of Dai-dʑiᴇk-dʑiᴇŋ (now Usi County). The Tang army, commanded by Tang Jiahui (Chinese: 汤嘉惠), allied with Karluks and Ashina Xian of Western Turkestan to alleviate the siege. The Arab army faced a counterattack and withdrew to Tashkent, where numerous Arab soldiers were captured but later released upon the payment of a ransom by the Umayyad caliphs. Subsequent to the conflict, the Arabs were displaced from the northern section of the Hezhong region. The Turks re-engaged with the Tang and then launched an assault on the Arabs in Fergana.

Following 720, the Tubo forces advanced northward into the Tarim Basin, while the Tang army re-entered Anxi in the 740s. The Battle of Talas in 751 inflicted severe losses on the Tang army, resulting in the original four towns of Anxi falling under the influence of the Tibetan Empire and Qocho. The city of Togang was reestablished under Tubo control in 790. By 840, the Qocho disintegrated, with a portion of the Qocho population establishing the Qocho Empire (present-day Turpan) as their base and adopting the Turkic designation Aksu. Following the eleventh century, Aksu commenced its Islamization under the influence of the Kura Khanate. In the twelfth century, Aksu, together with the Gaochang Qocho, became incorporated into Western Liao.

== Geography ==
The prefecture occupies the northwestern part of the Tarim Basin and the southern slopes of the Tian Shan. The southern part of the prefecture is within the Taklamakan desert. Agriculture is only possible in the areas irrigated by the Tarim River and its glacier-fed tributaries, the Aksu River and the Muzart River. Aksu Prefecture surrounds Aral, Xinjiang.

== Administrative divisions ==
Aksu Prefecture is divided into 2 county-level cities and 8 counties:

#	Name	Uyghur (UEY)	Uyghur Latin (ULY)	Chinese (S)	Hanyu Pinyin	Population (2020 Census)	Area (km^{2})	Density (/km^{2})
1	Aksu	ئاقسۇ شەھىرى	Aqsu Shehiri	阿克苏市	Ākèsū Shì	715,319	14,415	49.62
2	Kuqa (Kuchar, Kucha, Kuche)	كۇچار شەھىرى	Kuchar Shehiri	库车市	Kùchē Shì	530,328	14,525	36.51
3	Onsu County (Wenu)	ئونسۇ ناھىيىسى	Onsu Nahiyisi	温宿县	Wēnsù Xiàn	266,002	14,335	18.56
4	Xayar County (Shayar, Shaya)	شايار ناھىيىسى	Shayar Nahiyisi	沙雅县	Shāyǎ Xiàn	278,516	31,848	8.75
5	Xinhe County (Toksu)	توقسۇ ناھىيىسى	Toqsu Nahiyisi	新和县	Xīnhé Xiàn	194,473	5,820	33.41
6	Baicheng County	باي ناھىيىسى	Bay Nahiyisi	拜城县	Bàichéng Xiàn	231,113	15,891	14.54
7	Uqturpan County (Wushi)	ئۇچتۇرپان ناھىيىسى	Uchturpan Nahiyisi	乌什县	Wūshí Xiàn	205,571	9,051	22.71
8	Awat County	ئاۋات ناھىيىسى	Avat Nahiyisi	阿瓦提县	Āwǎtí Xiàn	242,481	13,018	18.63
9	Kalpin County (Kelpin)	كەلپىن ناھىيىسى	Kelpin Nahiyisi	柯坪县	Kēpíng Xiàn	50,619	8,912	5.68

== Demographics ==
As of 2020, 2,051,412 (80.1%) of the 2,561,674 residents of the county were Uyghur, 475,323 (18.6%) were Han Chinese and 34,939 were from other ethnic groups.

As of 1999, 75.0% of the population of Aksu (Aqsu, Akesu) Prefecture was Uyghur and 23.7% of the population was Han Chinese.
