= Qurban Mamut =

Uyghur writer

Qurban Mamut is a writer and former editor of the journal Xinjiang Civilization. He is a Uyghur and has been detained in a Xinjiang re-education camp.
