= Ten Thousand Nations Coming to Pay Tribute =

Qing dynasty painting

Wintertime version

Second version (summertime)

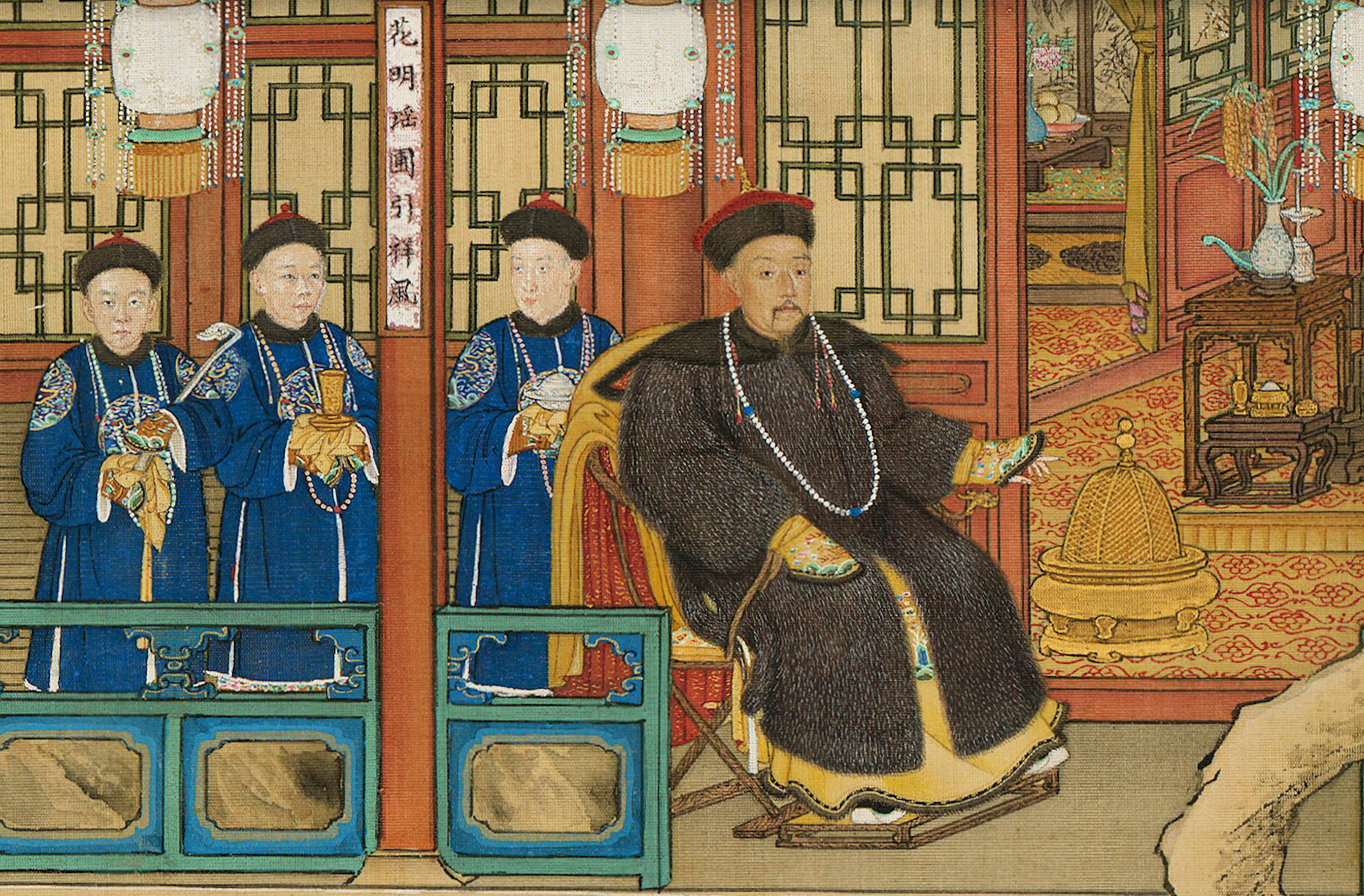
The Qianlong Emperor, aged 65, in the Forbidden City, attending the ceremony

Ten Thousand Nations Coming to Pay Tribute (Chinese: 萬國來朝圖; pinyin: Wànguó láicháo tú, 1761) is a monumental (299 × 207cm) Qing dynasty painting depicting foreign delegations visiting the Qianlong Emperor in the Forbidden city in Beijing during the late 1750s.

The painting was intended to show the cosmopolitanism and the centrality of the Qing Empire, since most countries of Asia and Europe are shown paying their respects to the Chinese Emperor. China already had a long tradition of such paintings (designated as "Portraits of Periodical Offering"), starting from around the 6th century CE, but such paintings ended around the time of the Opium War, which shattered the ideal of the Great Chinese Empire in the middle of the world, and gave way to the awareness of China as simply one country among others. The principle was one of more-or-less voluntary submission, with presents being periodically brought to the Chinese Emperor as a symbolic gesture of acknowledgement of Chinese overlordship. According to Ming period writings "The Emperor resides in the center and holds the reins of all other nations and all things under the sun".

The "ten thousand" ("萬") in the name means "countless" rather than a literal number.

== Countries depicted ==
=== East and Southeast Asia ===
Delegates of many Asian countries appear, such as Korea (朝鮮), Vietnam (安南), Ryukyu (琉球國), Siam (暹羅國), Luzon (呂宋), Sulu (蘇祿), and Myanmar (緬甸國).

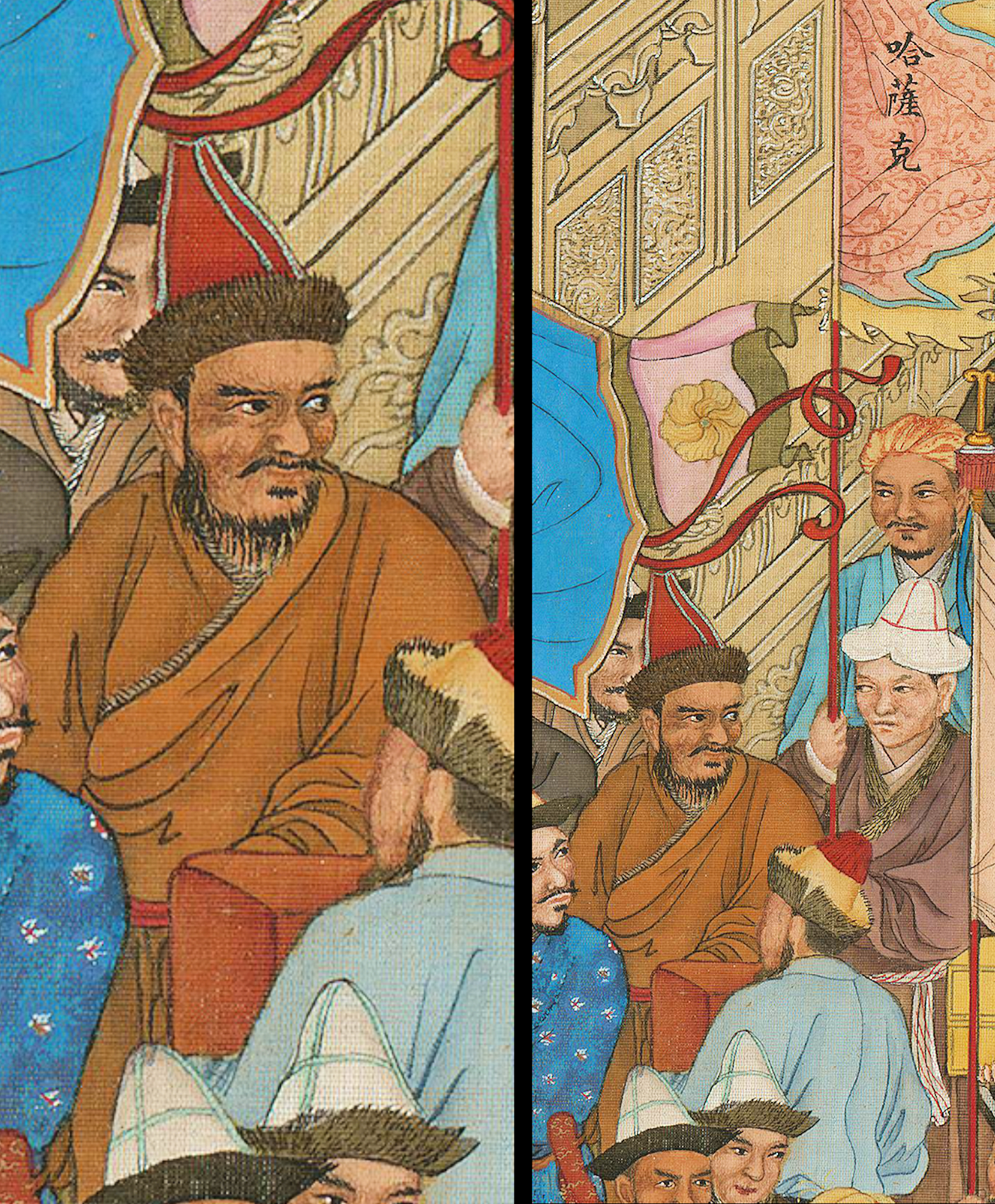
Kazakh delegates (哈薩克)

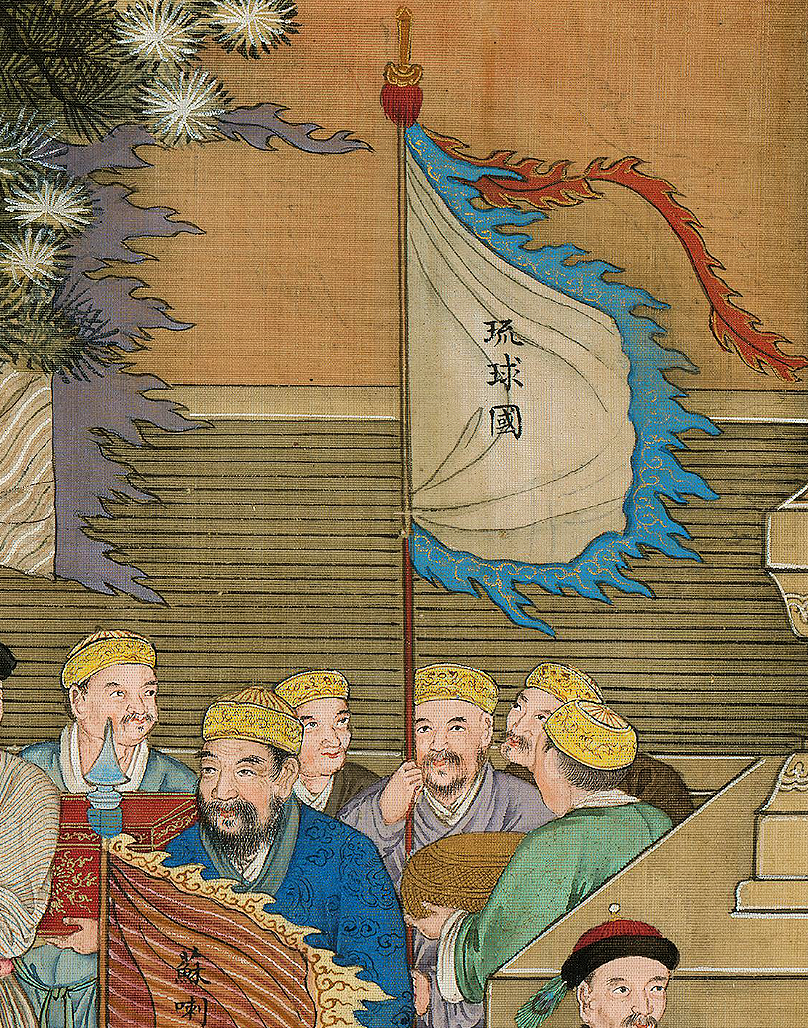
Ryukyu delegates (琉球國)

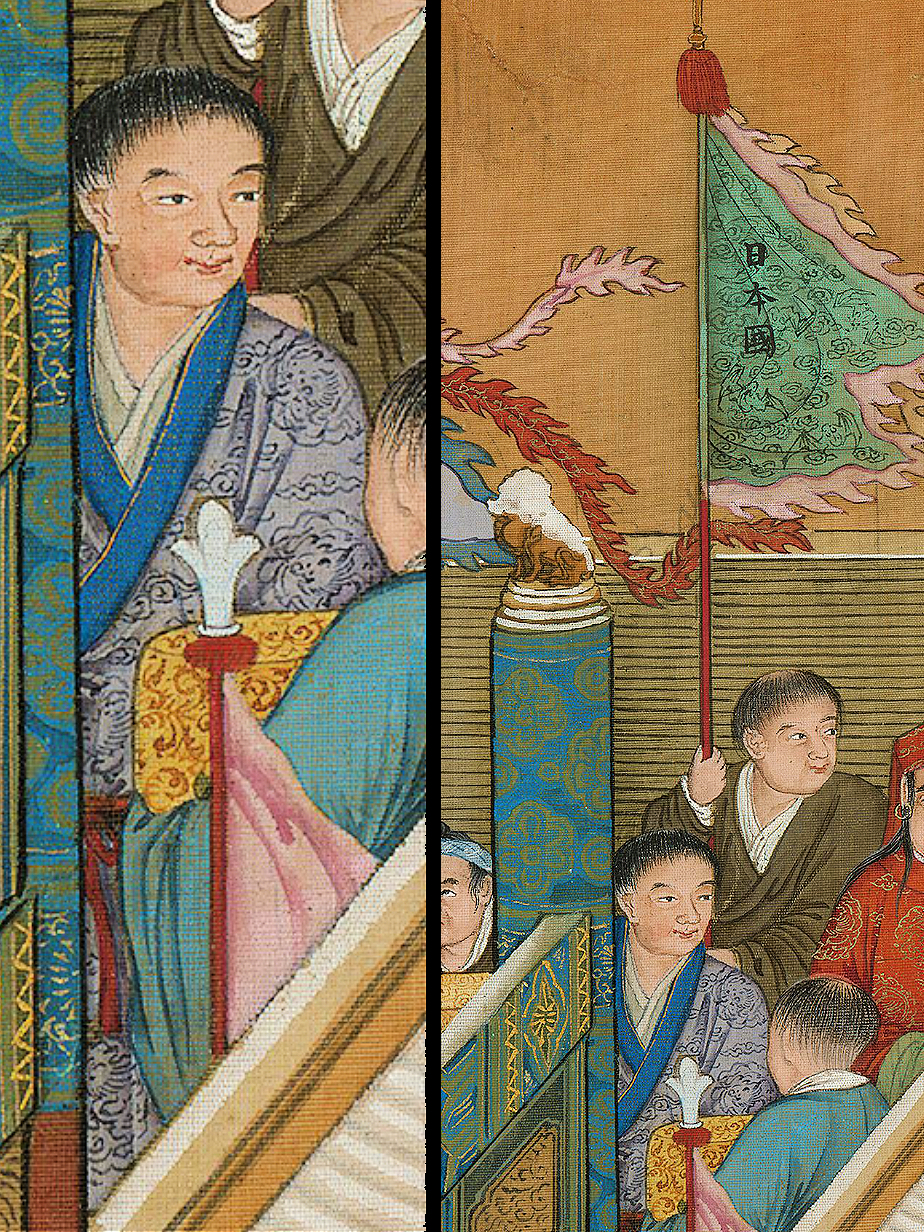
Japan delegates (日本國)

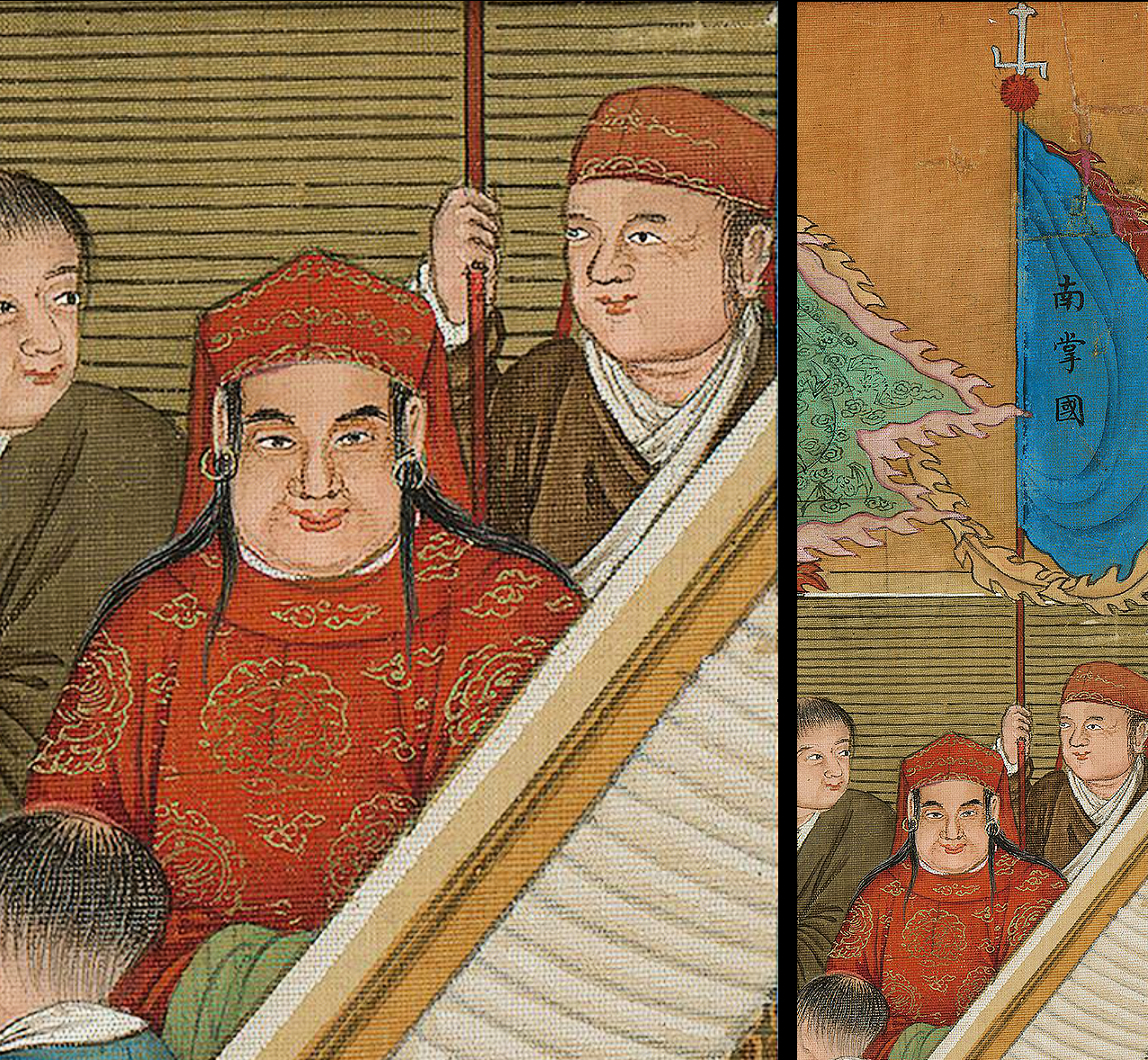
Luang Phrabang delegates (南掌國)

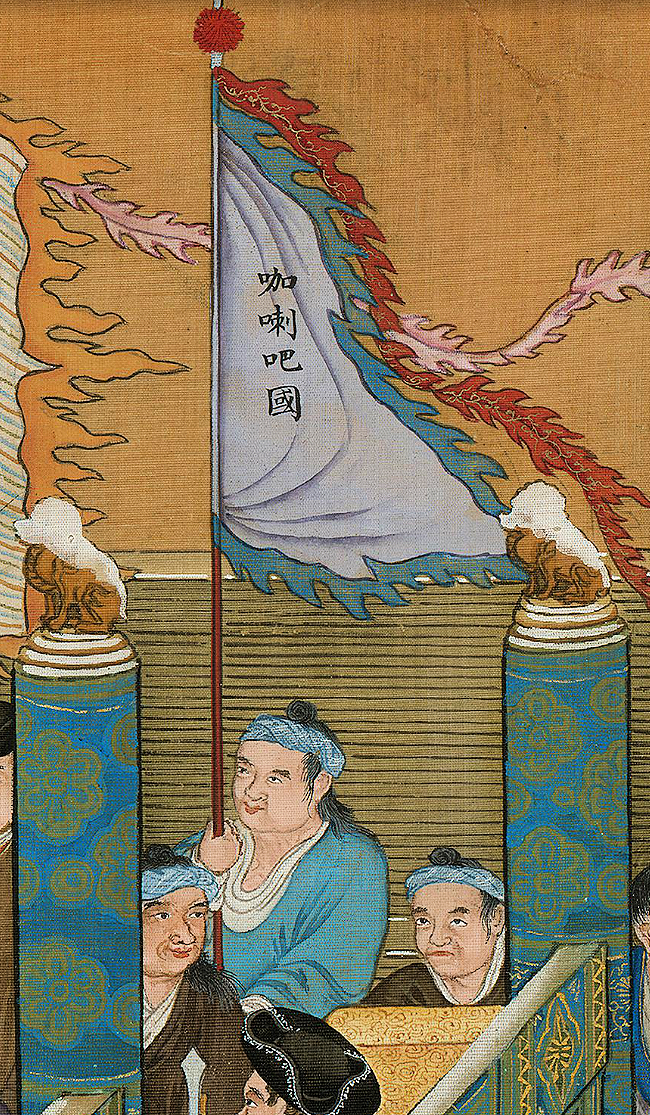
Jakarta delegates (咖喇吧國)

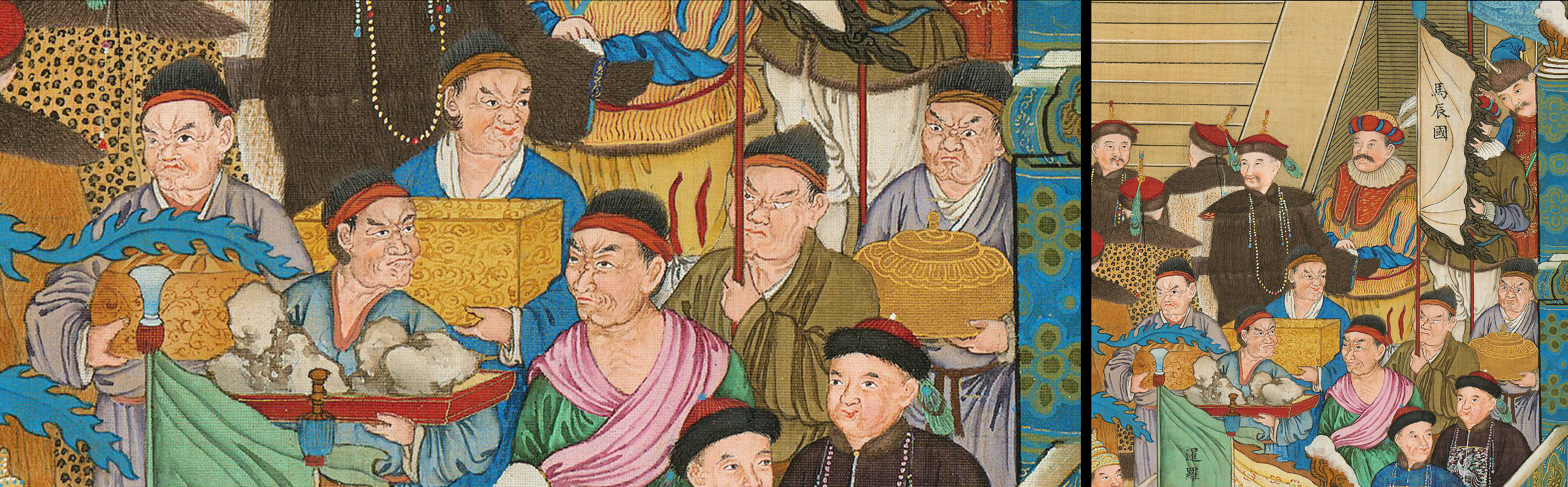
Banjarmasin delegates (馬辰國)

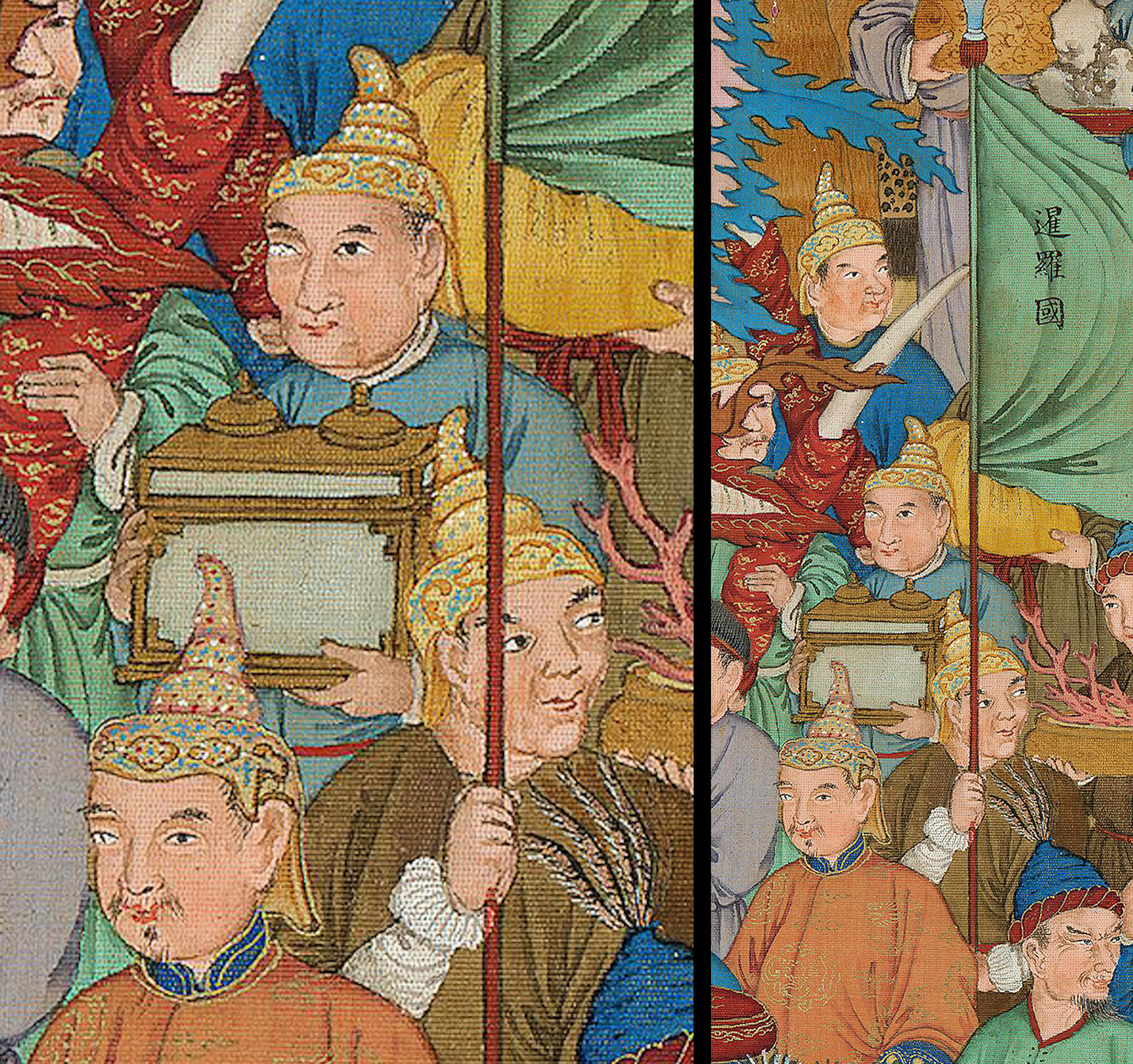
Siam delegates (暹羅國)

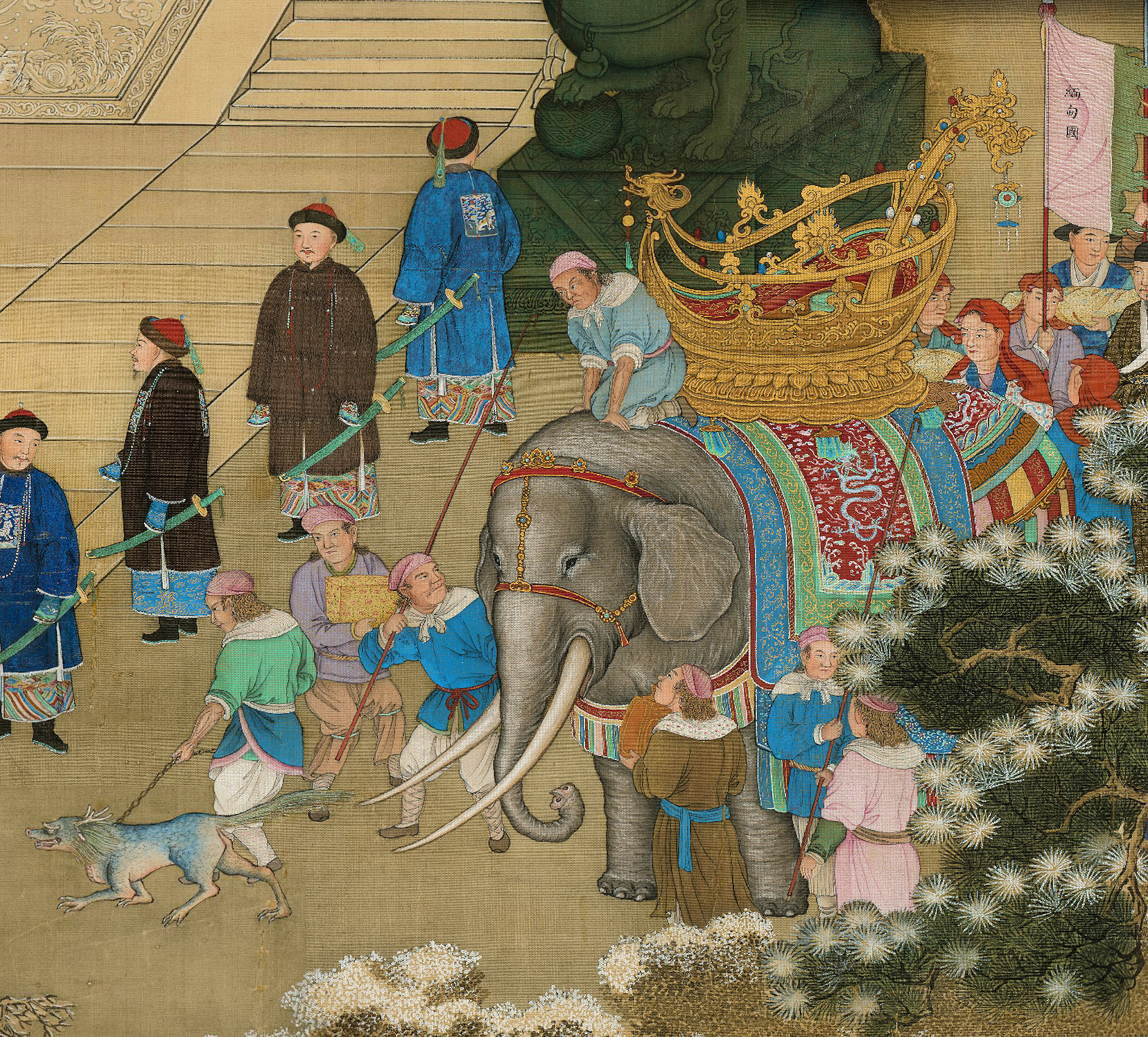
Myanmar delegates (緬甸國)

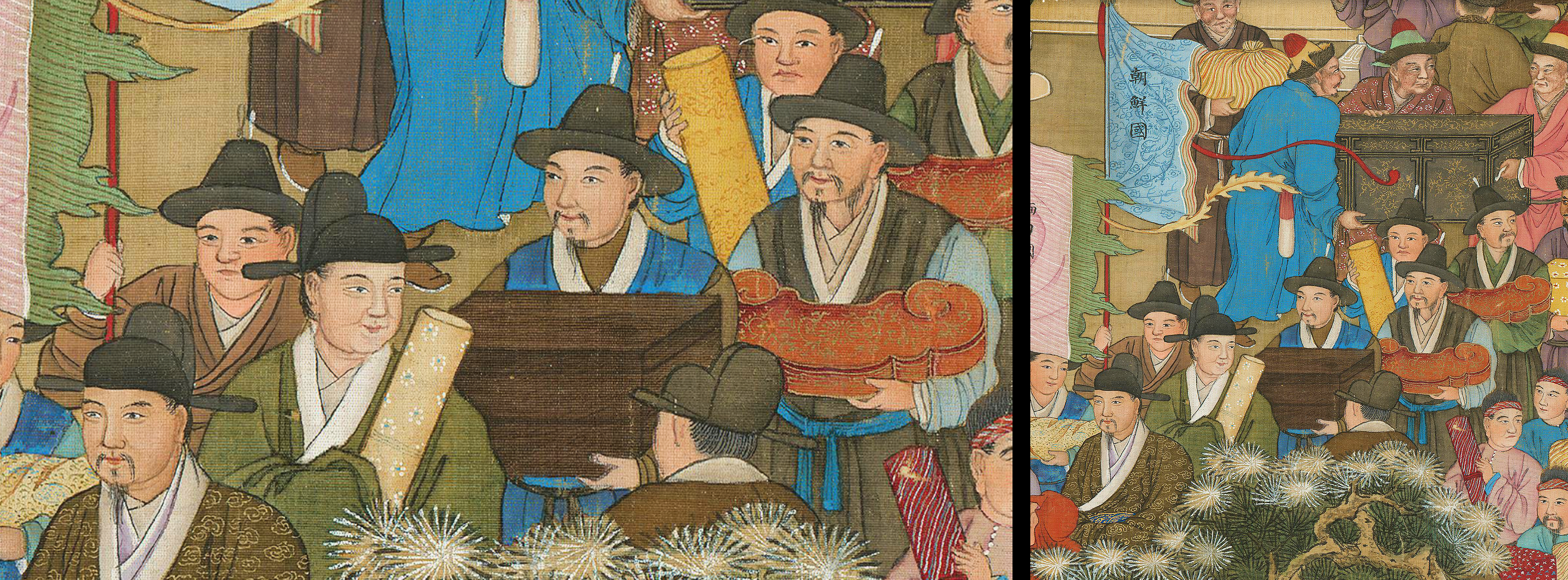
Korea delegates (朝鮮國)

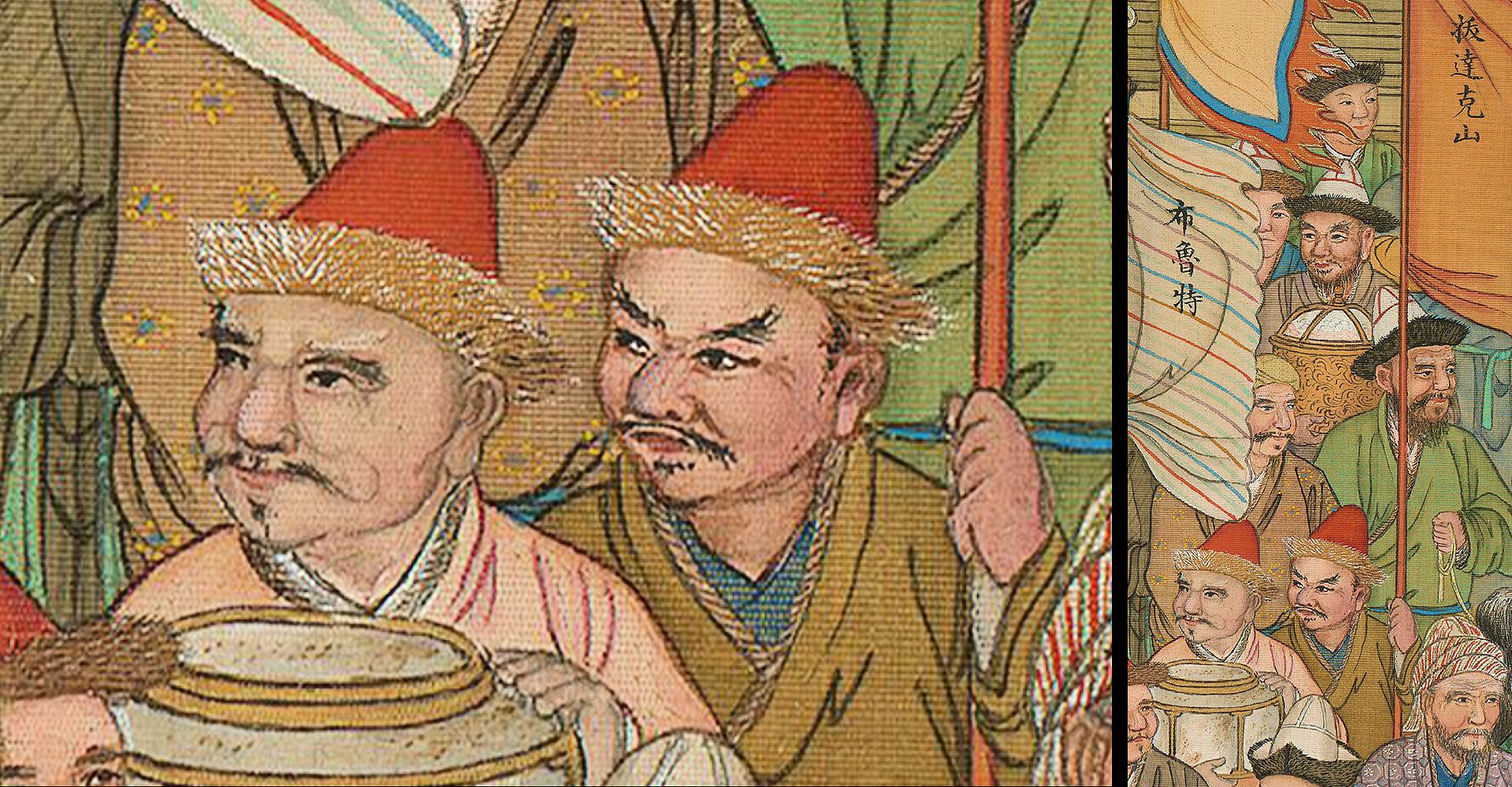
Badakhshan delegates (拔達克山)

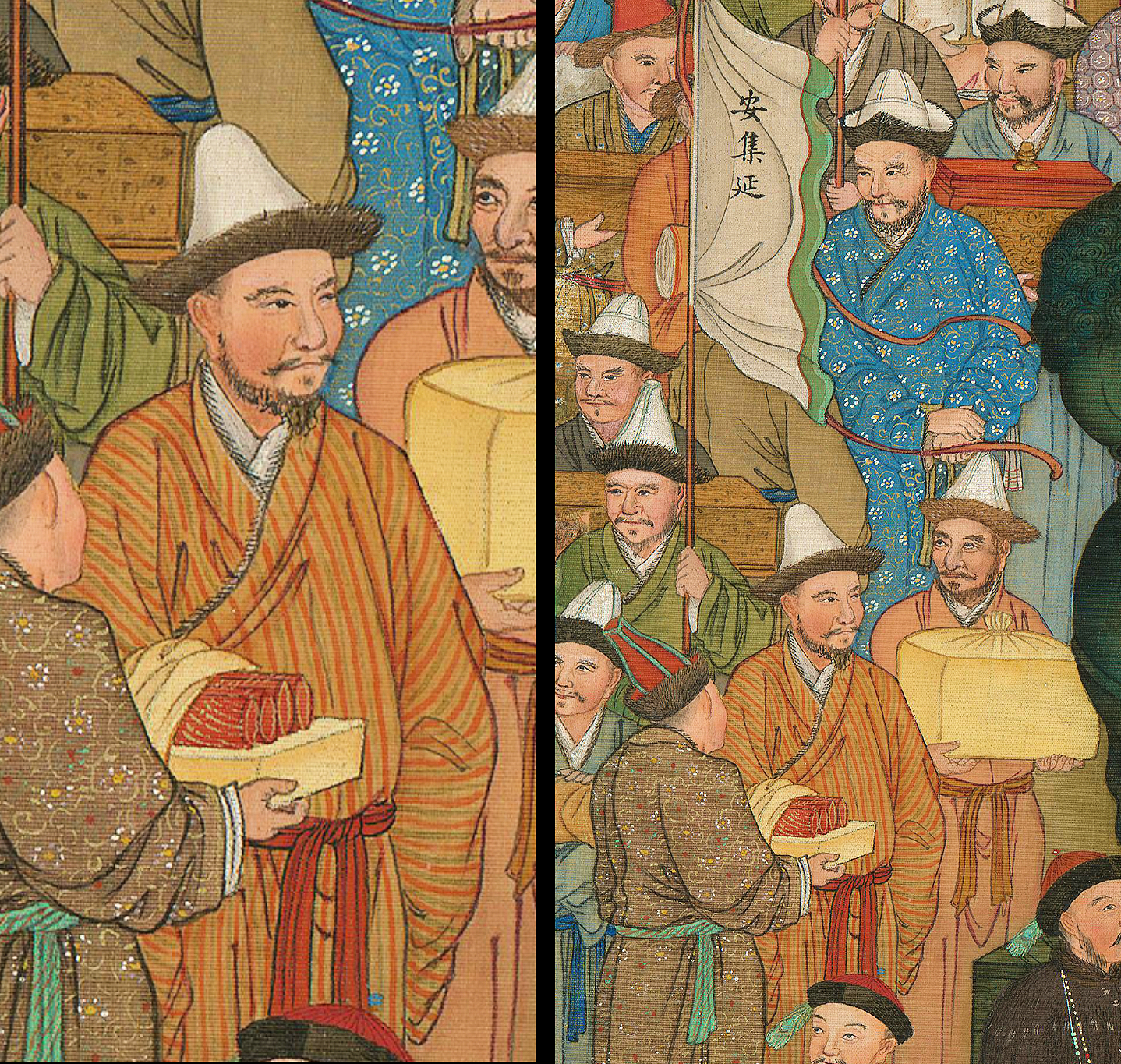
Andijan delegates (安集延)

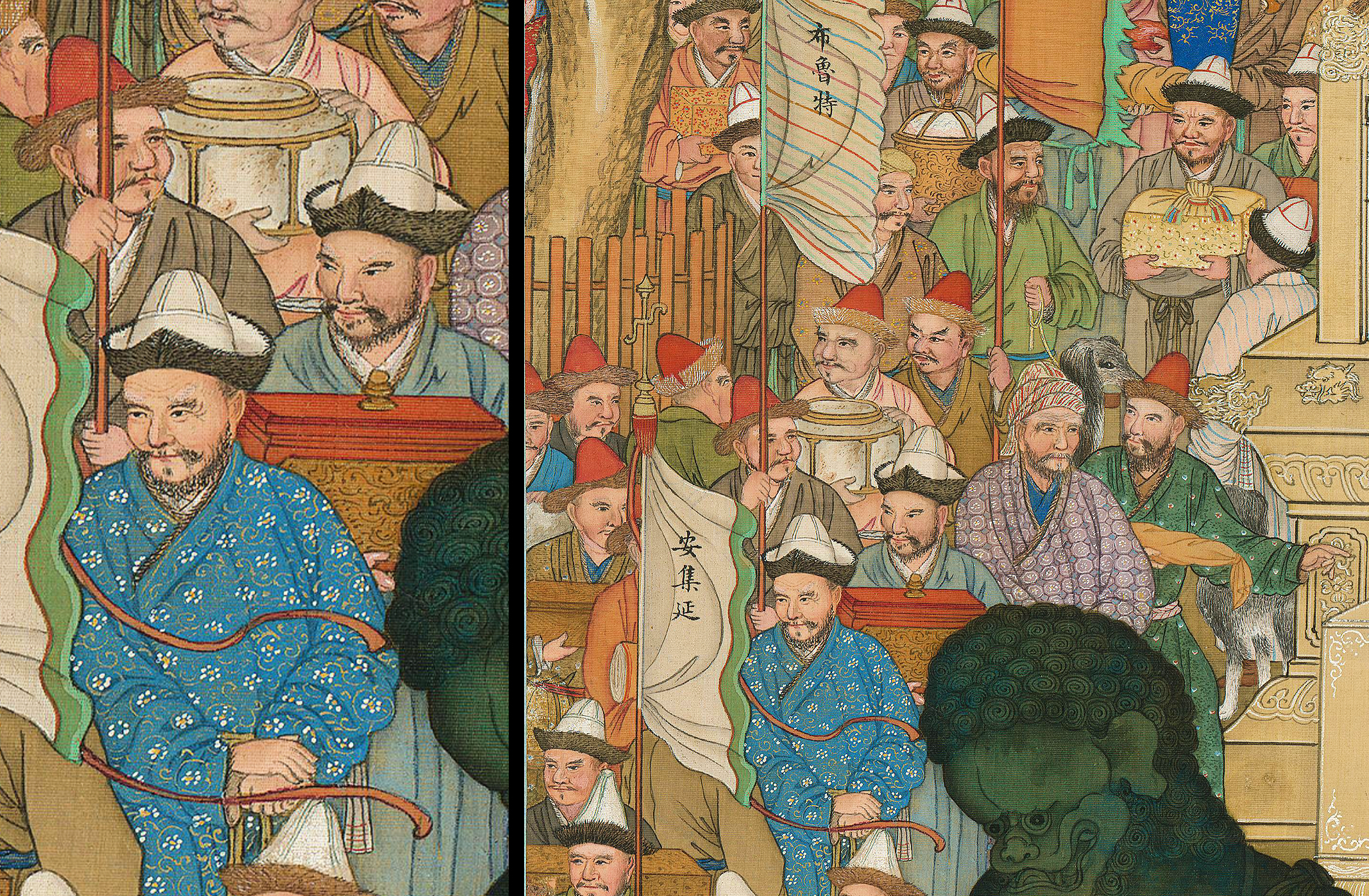
Kyrgyz delegates (布魯特)

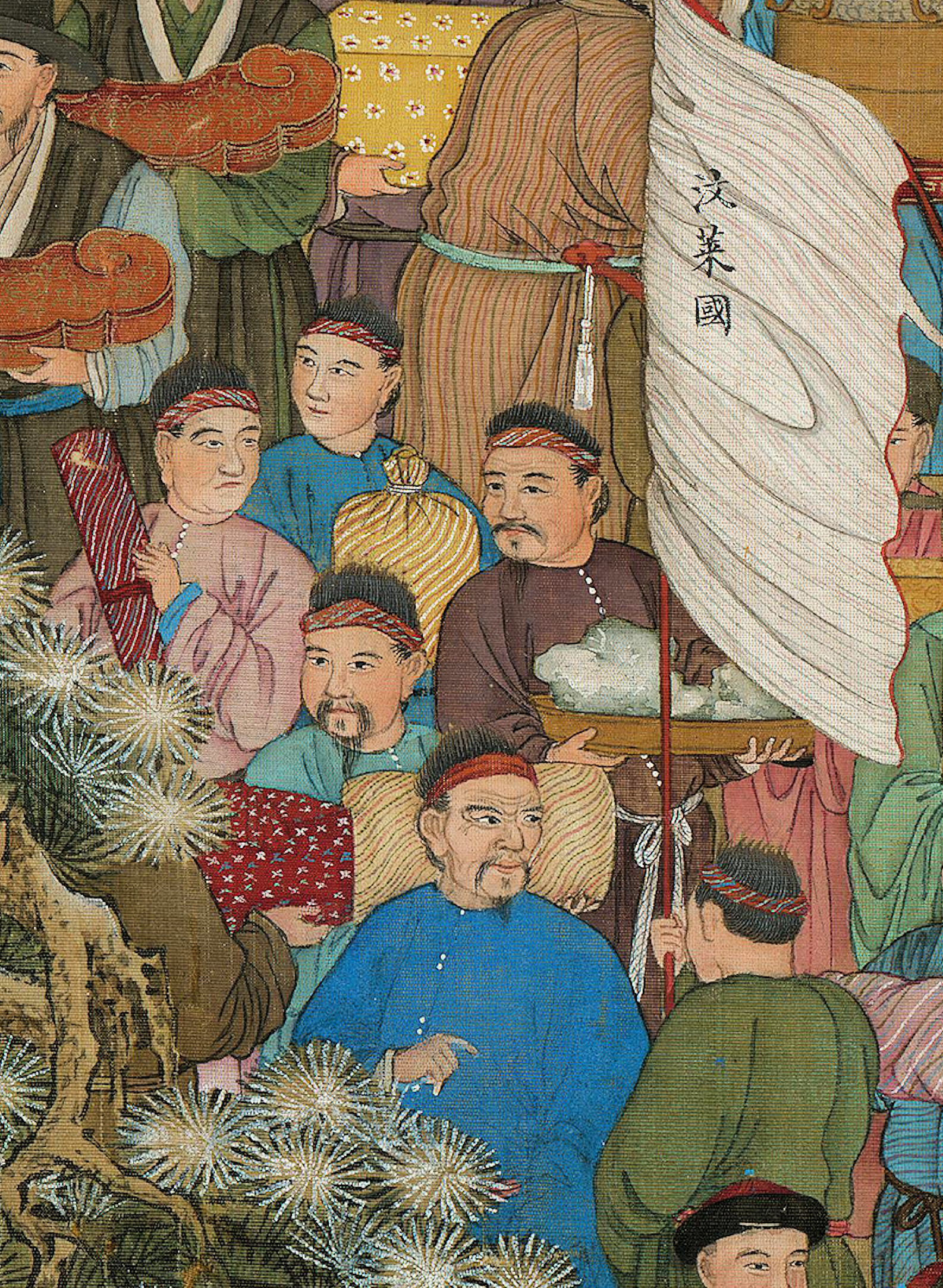
Brunei delegates (汶萊國)

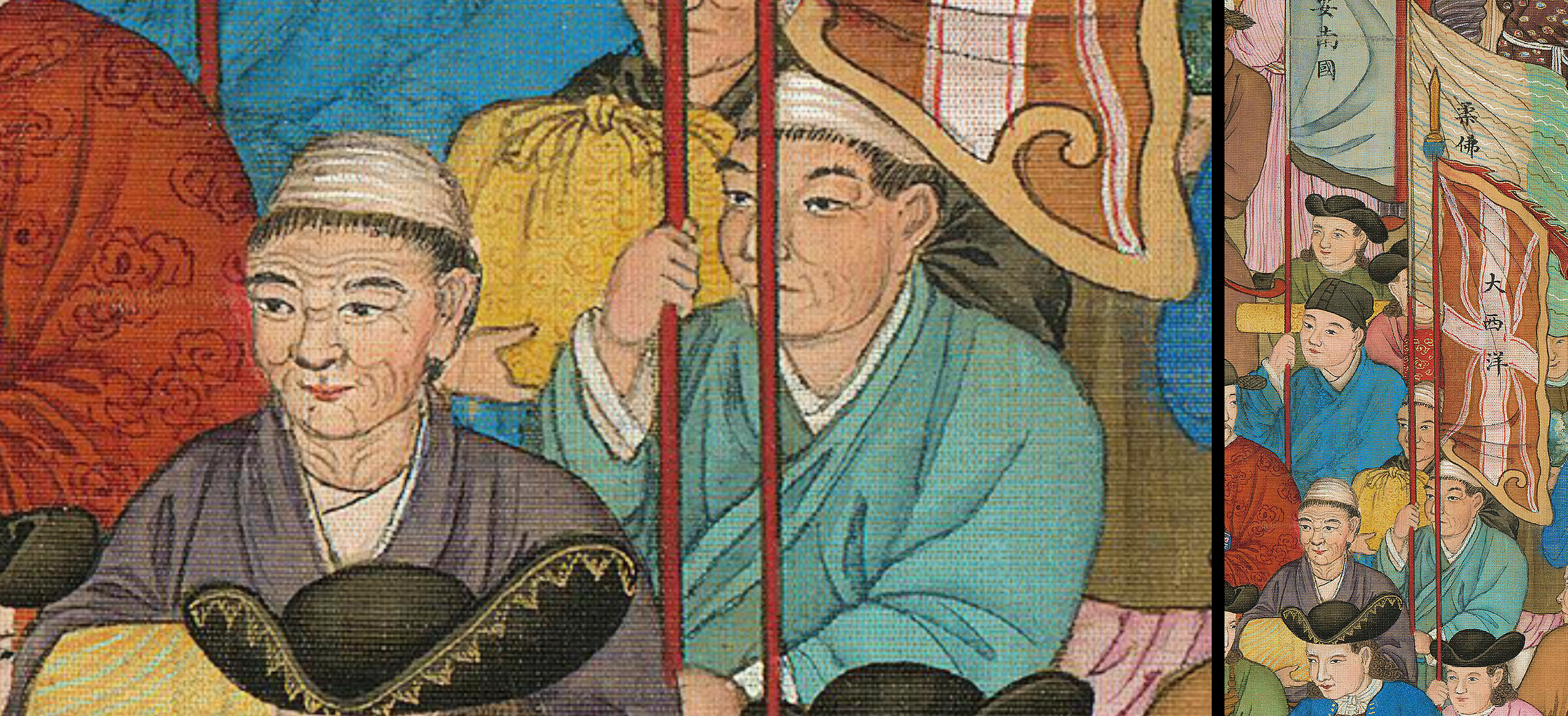
Johor delegates (柔佛國)

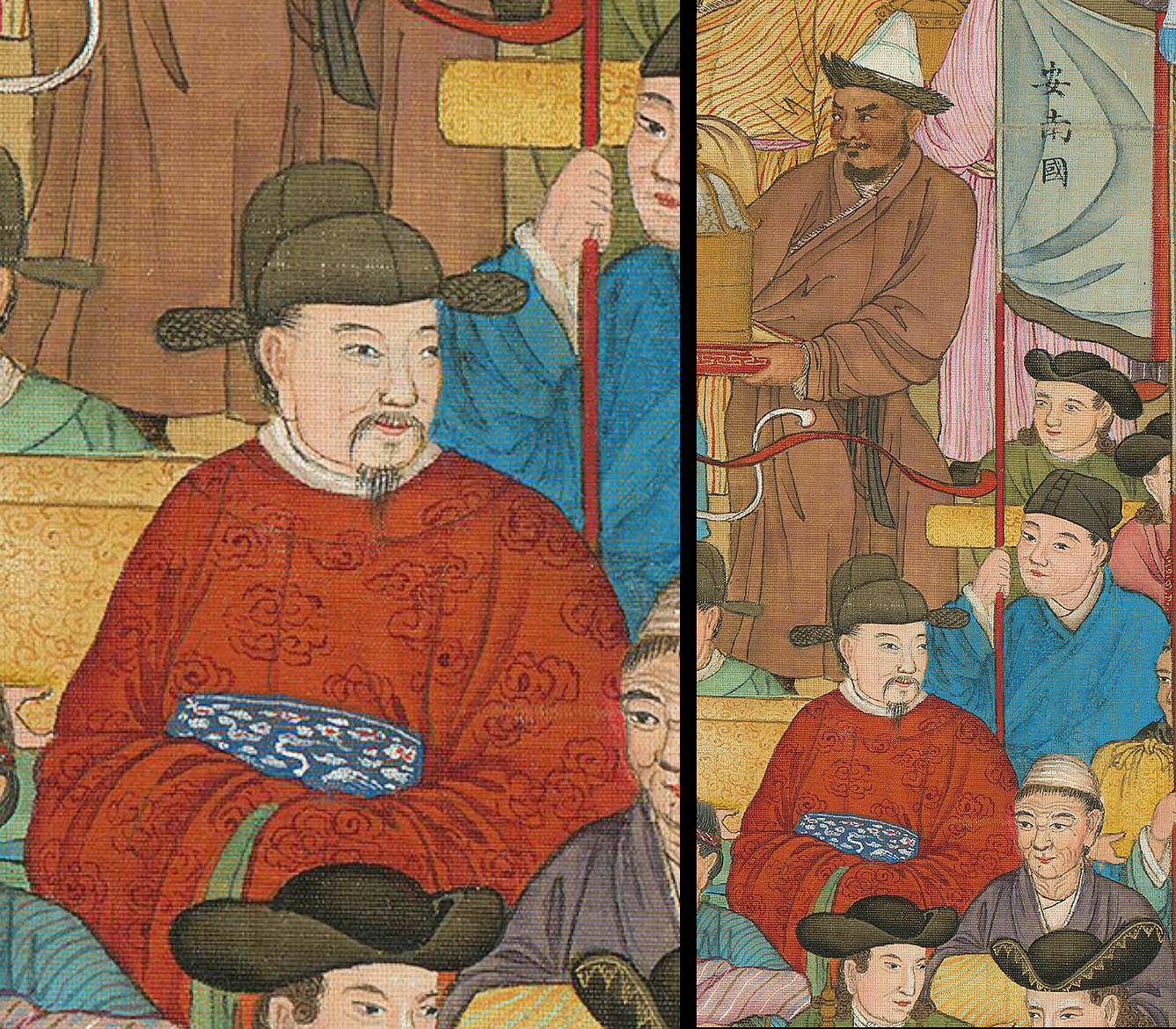
Annam (安南國) delegates

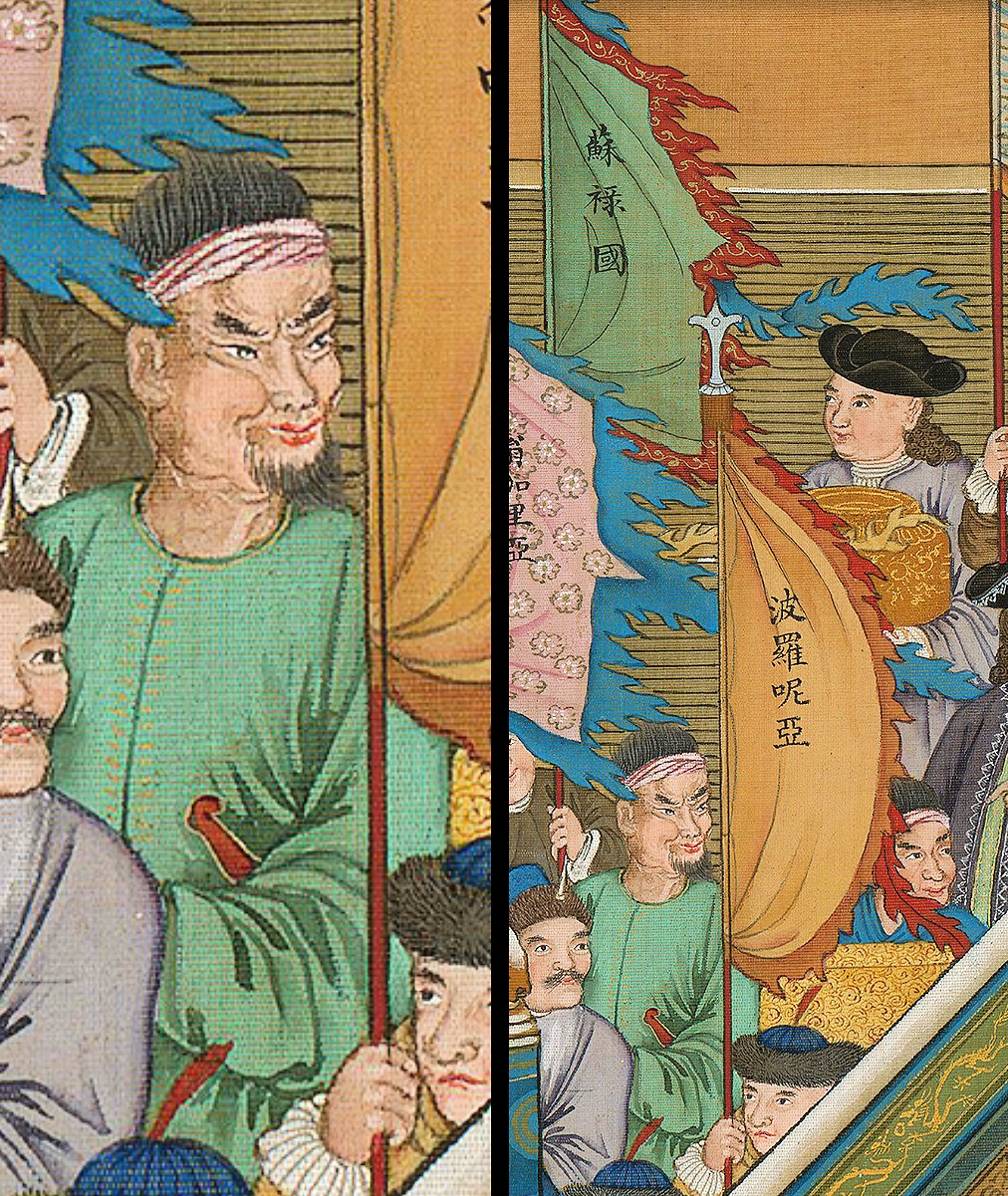
Sulu Archipelago (蘇祿國) delegates

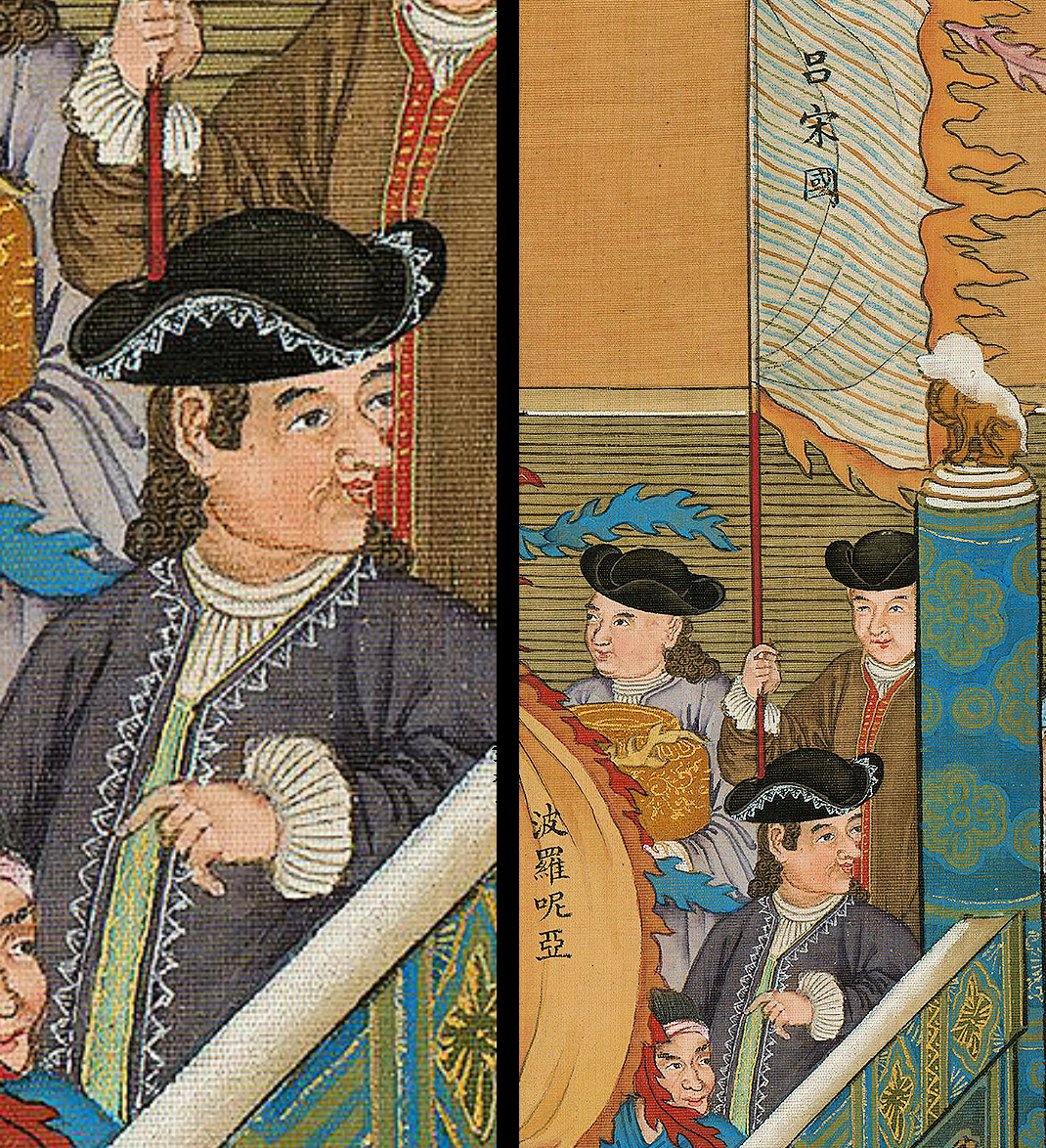
Luzon (Spanish Philippines, 呂宋國) delegates

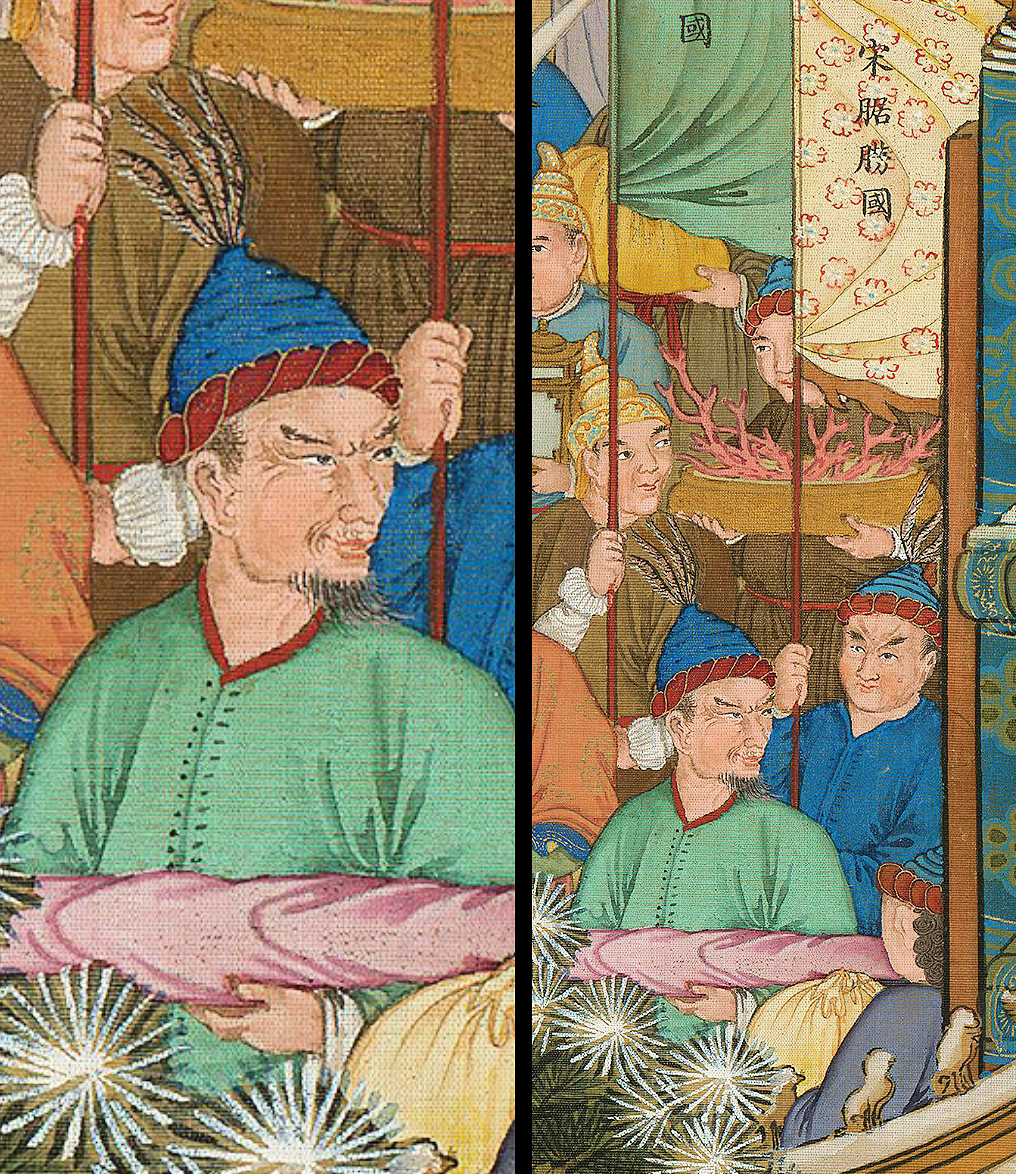
Sultanate of Singora (宋腒𦛨國) delegates

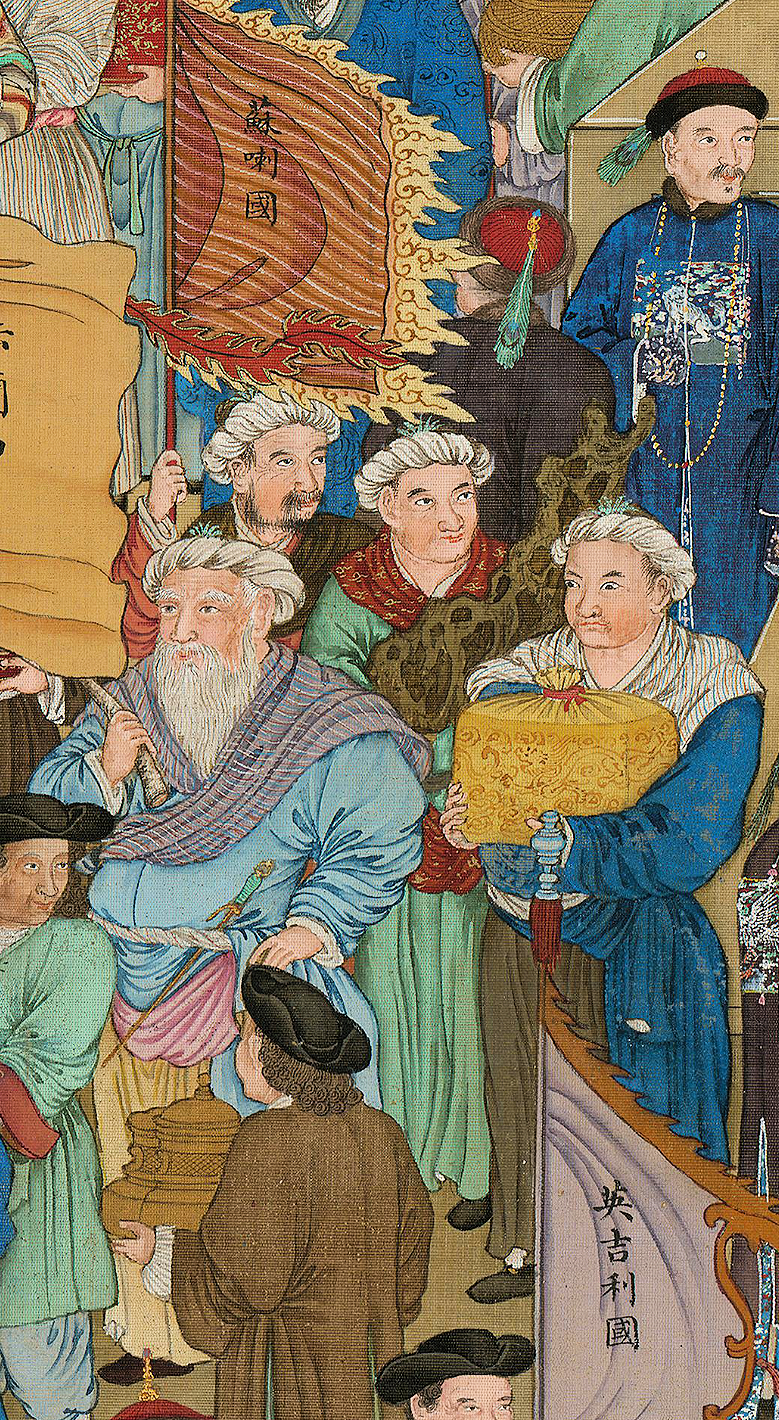
Surat (蘇喇國) delegates

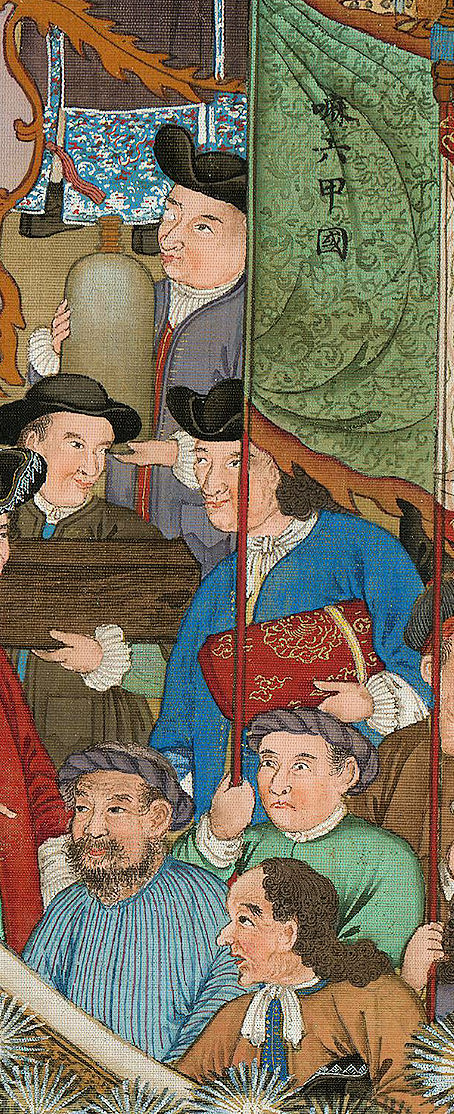
Malacca (馬六甲國) delegates

=== Xinjiang ===
Numerous representatives of the newly conquered territory of Xinjiang (through the Dzungar–Qing Wars) also appear: Ili (伊犁), the core of the former Dzungar Khanate; Uqturpan (烏什); Kashgar (哈什哈爾); and Yarkent (葉爾奇木).

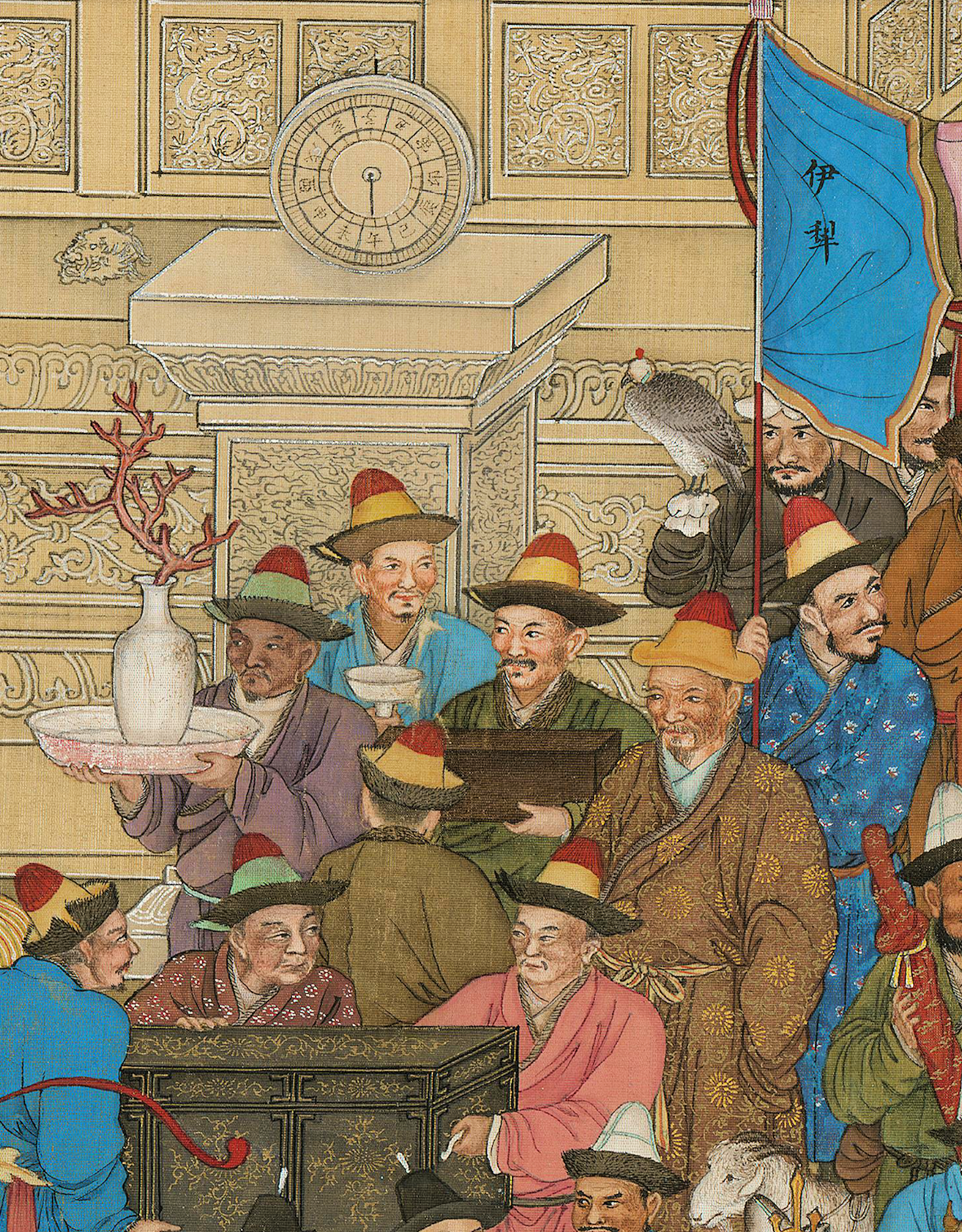
Ili delegates (flag with "伊犁", Ili, former Dzungar Khanate)

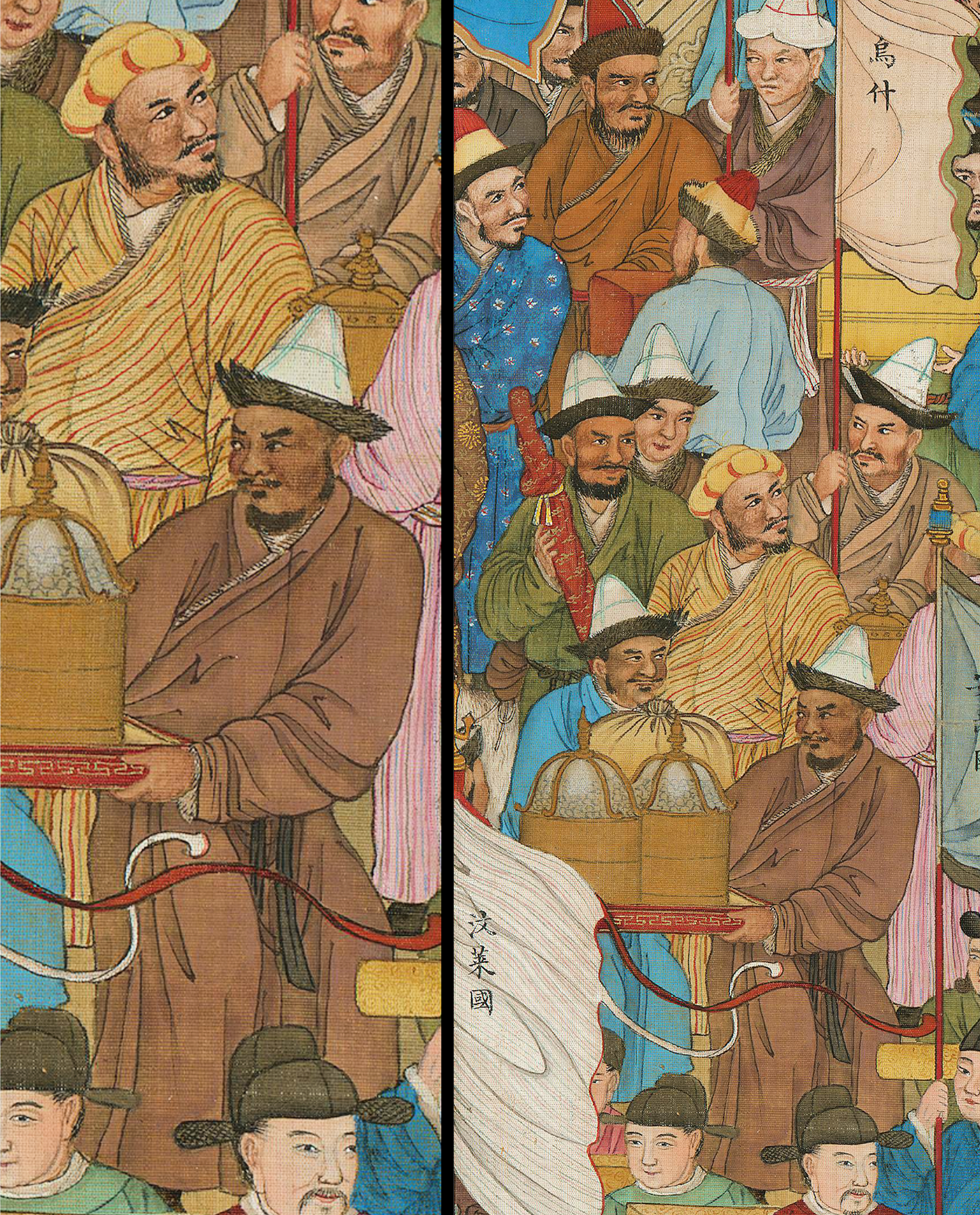
Uqturpan delegates (flag "烏什")

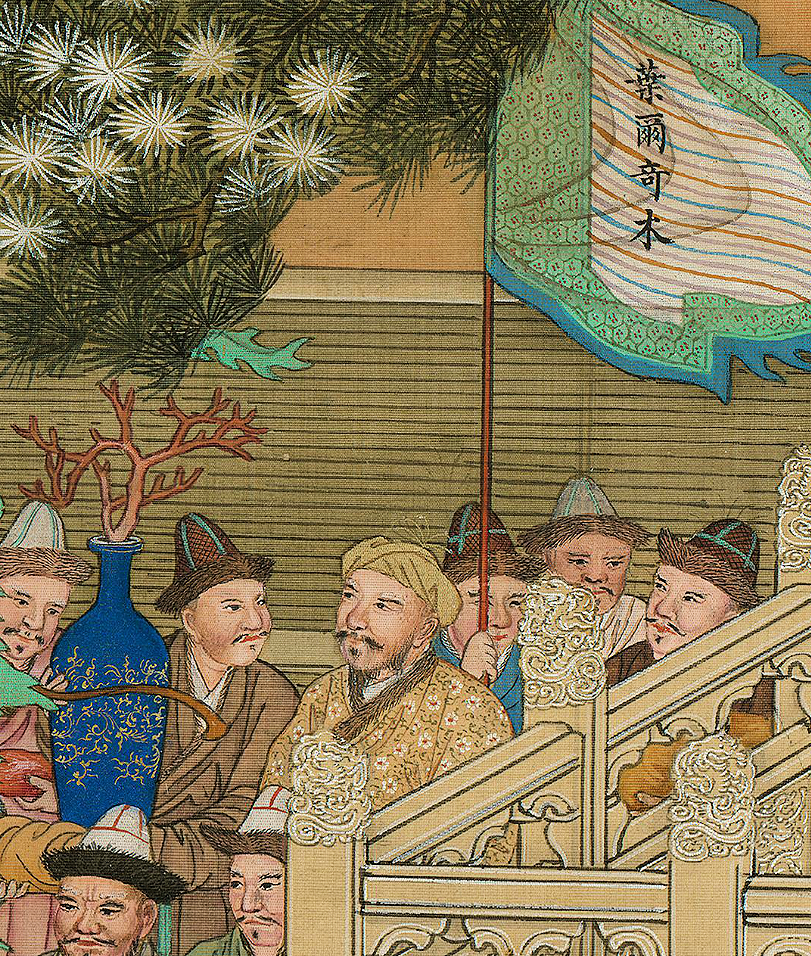
Yarkent delegates (葉爾奇木)

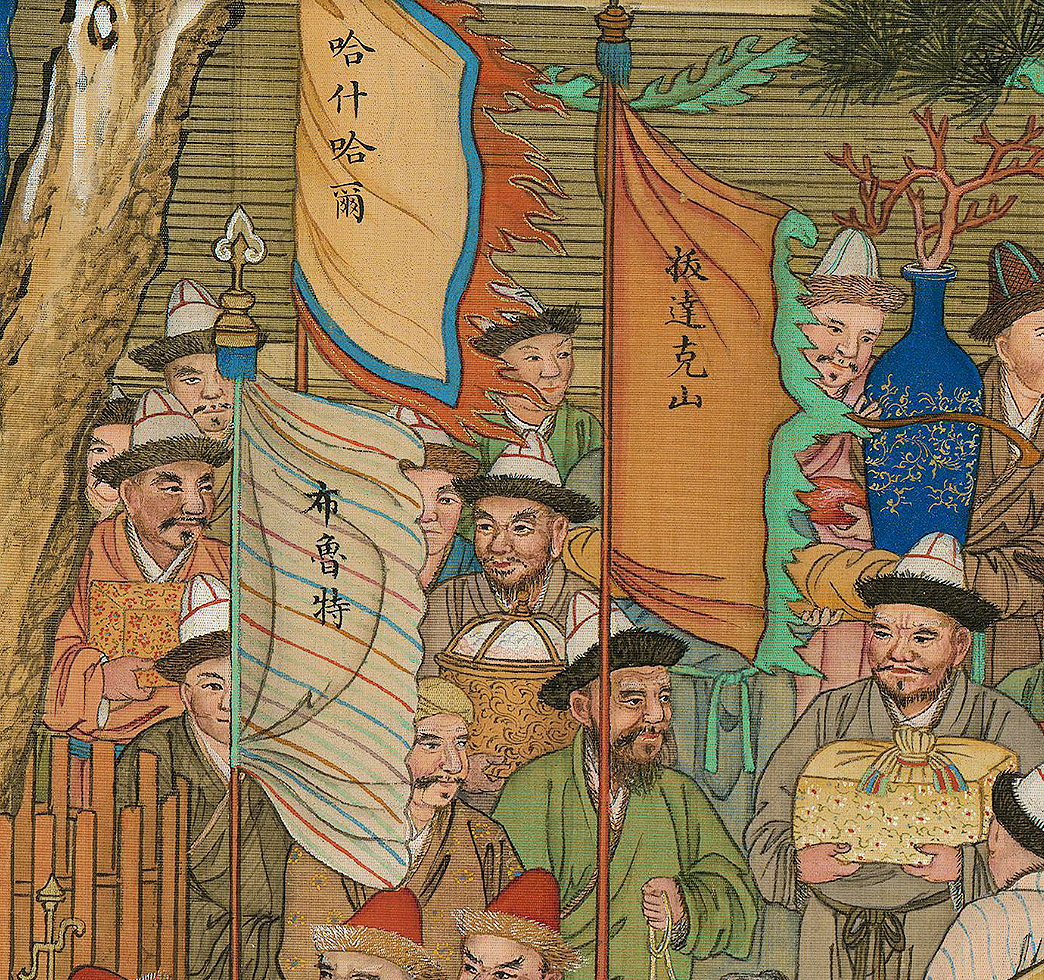
Kashgar delegates (哈什哈爾)

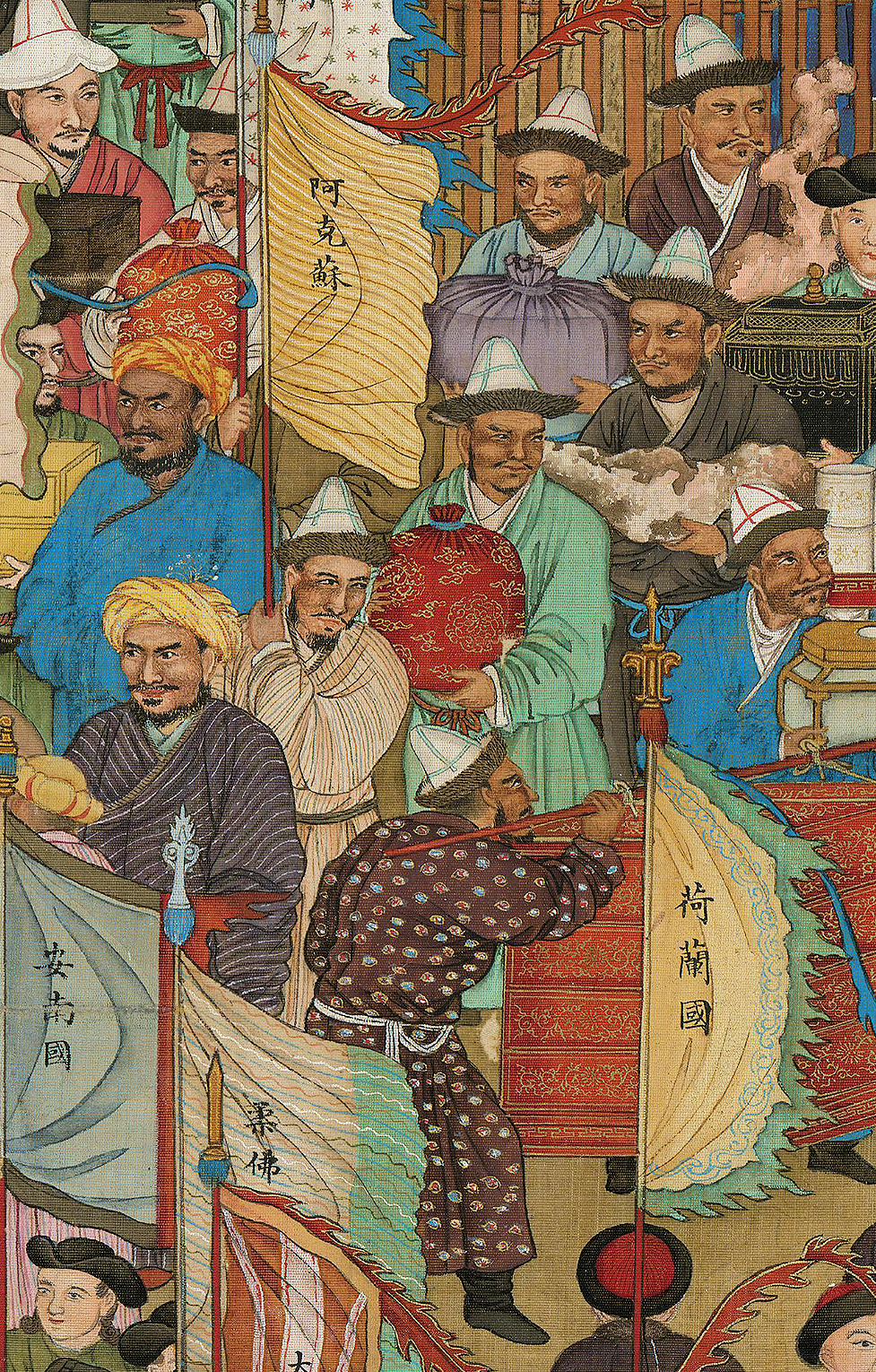
Aksu (阿克蘇) delegates

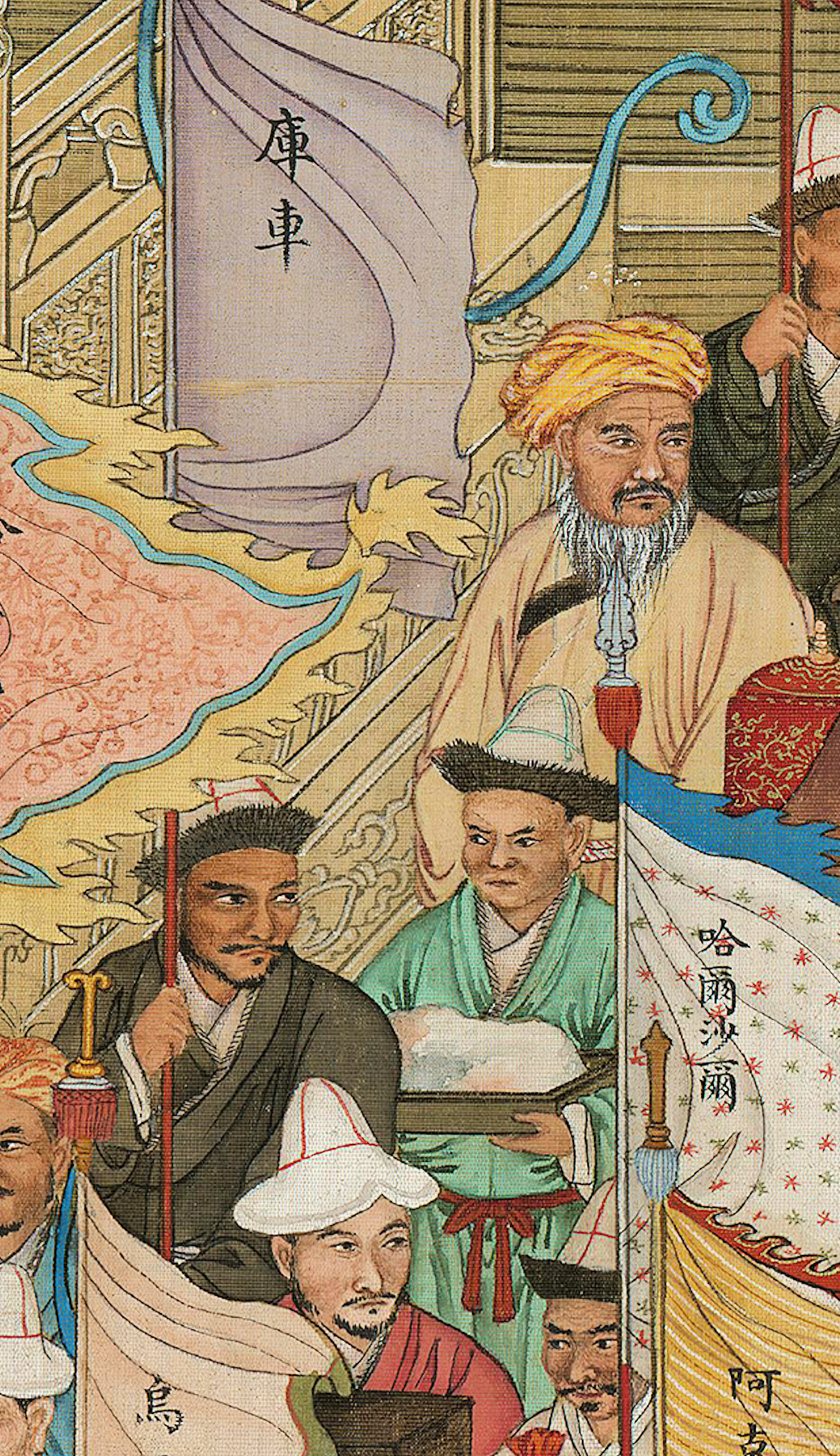
Kucha (庫車) delegates

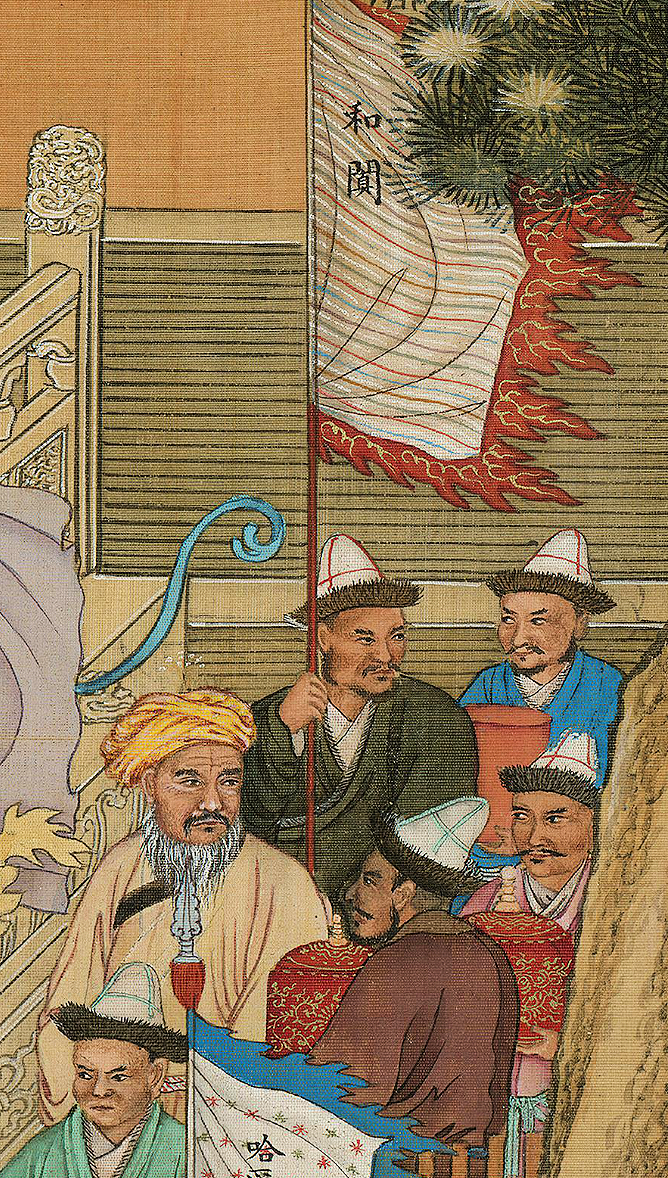
Khotan (和闐) delegates

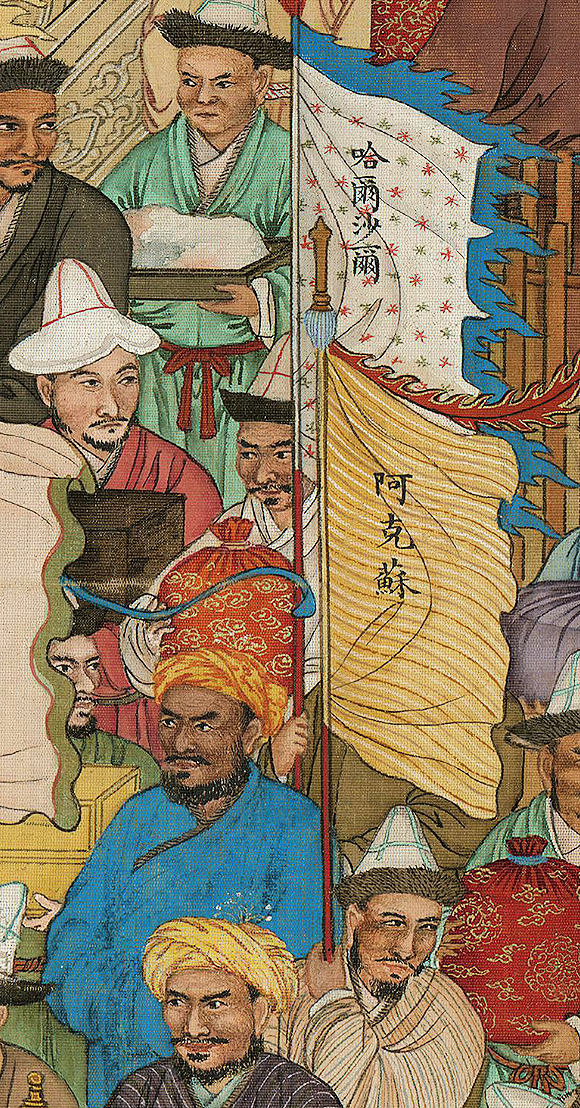
Qarashahr (哈爾沙爾) delegates

=== Europe ===
Many representatives of Europe are also present, such as France (法蘭西), Holland (荷蘭), England (英吉利), and Russia (鄂羅斯國).

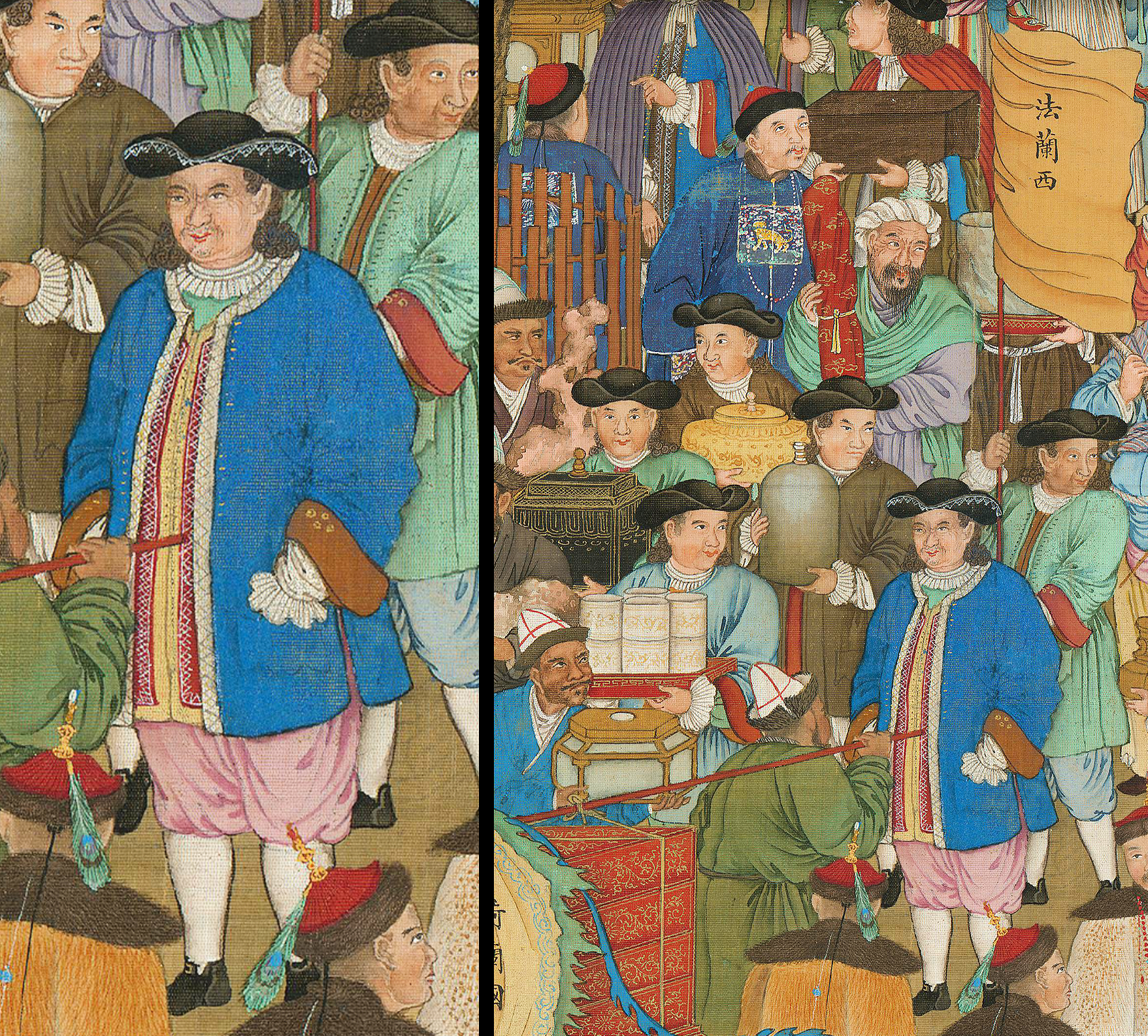
France delegates (flag "法蘭西")

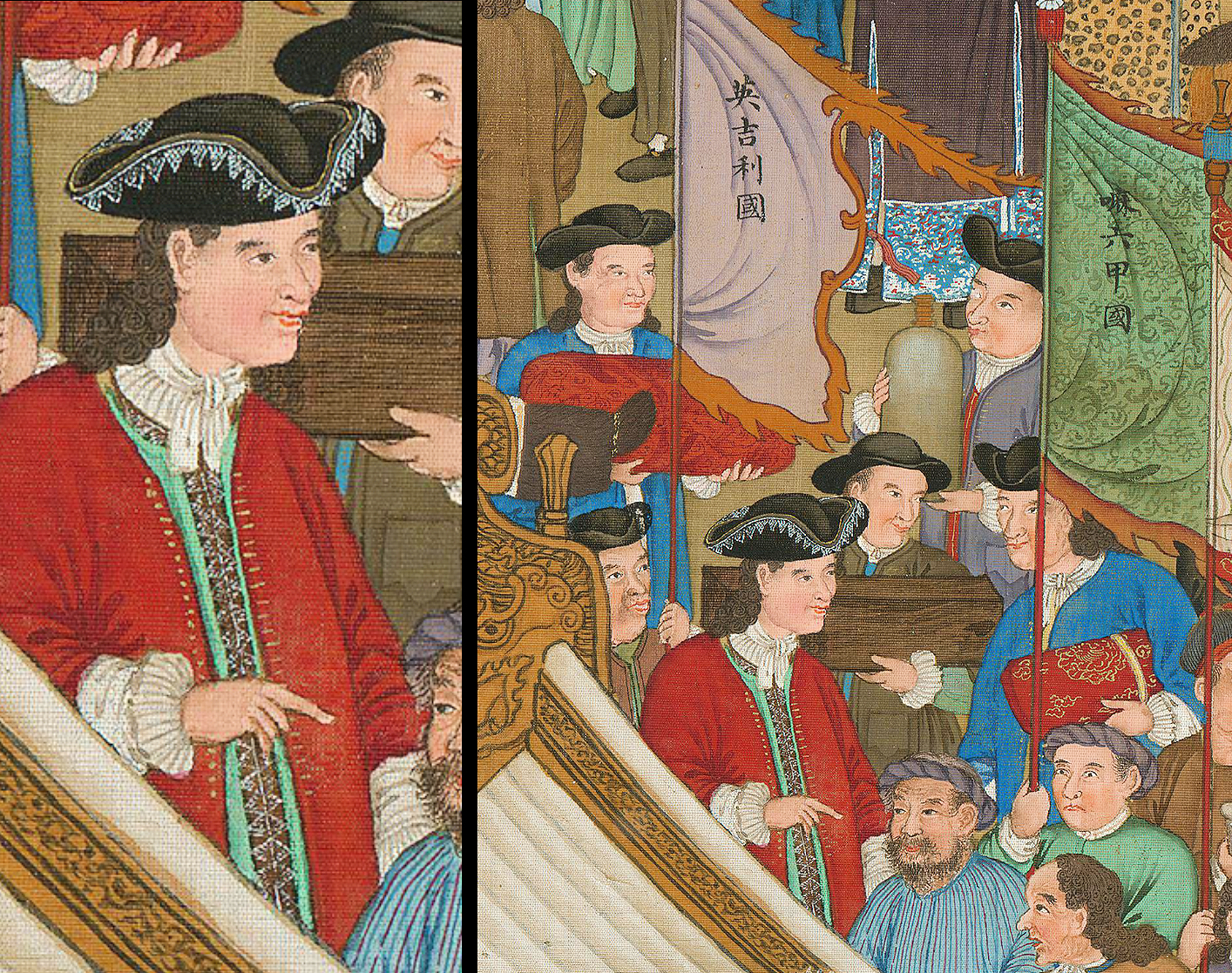
England delegates (英吉利國)

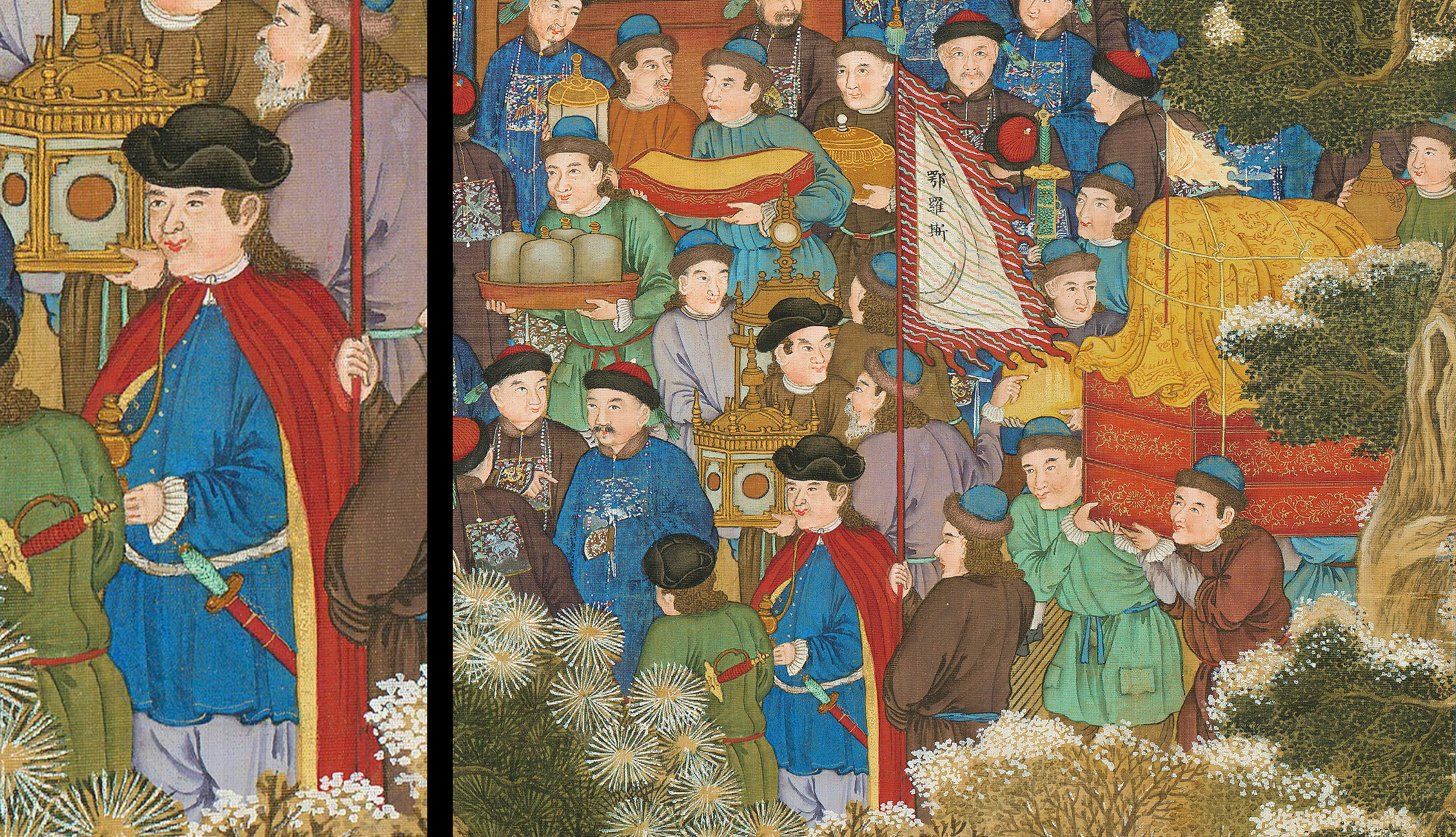
Russia delegates (鄂羅斯國)

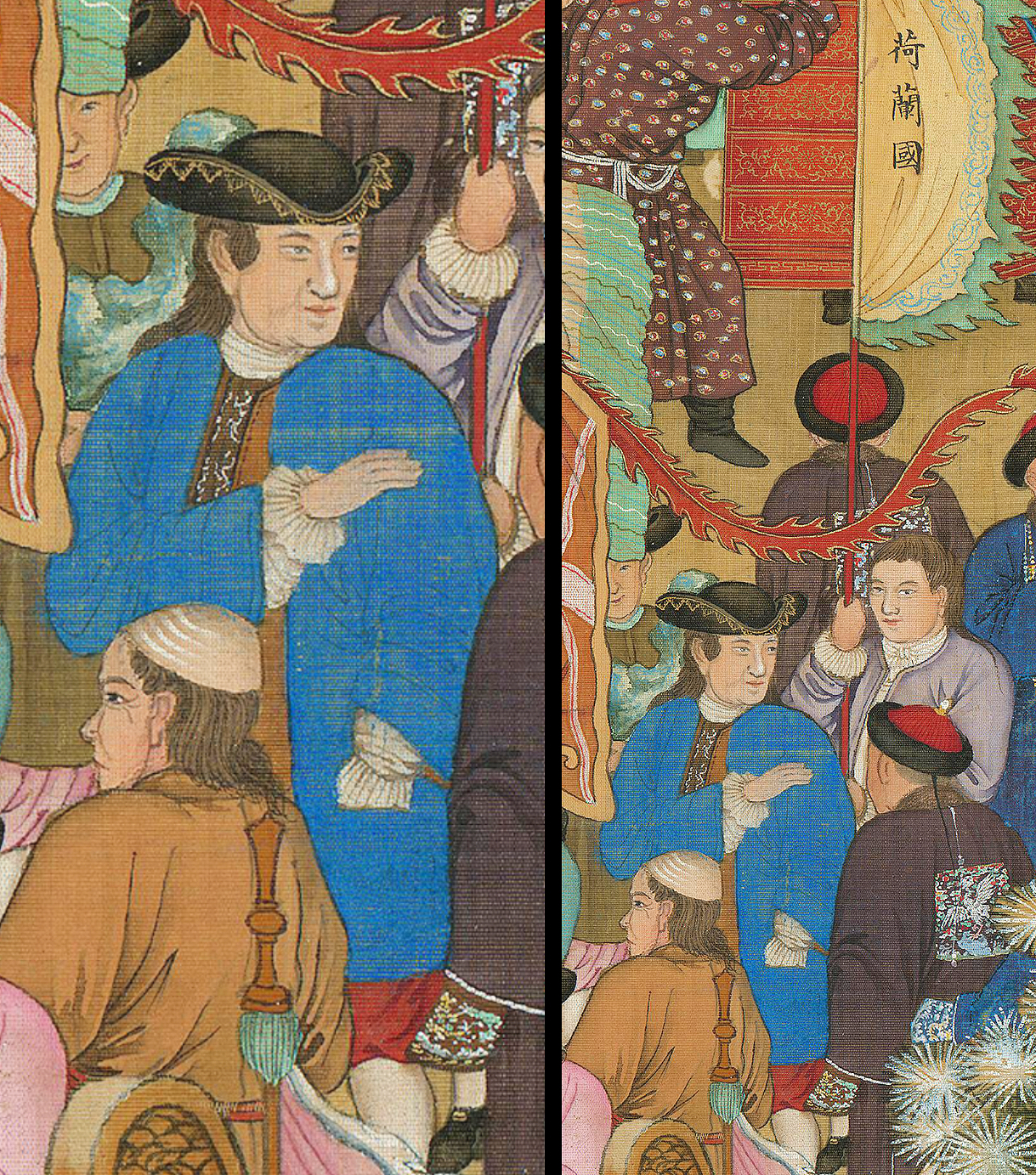
Holland delegates (荷蘭國)

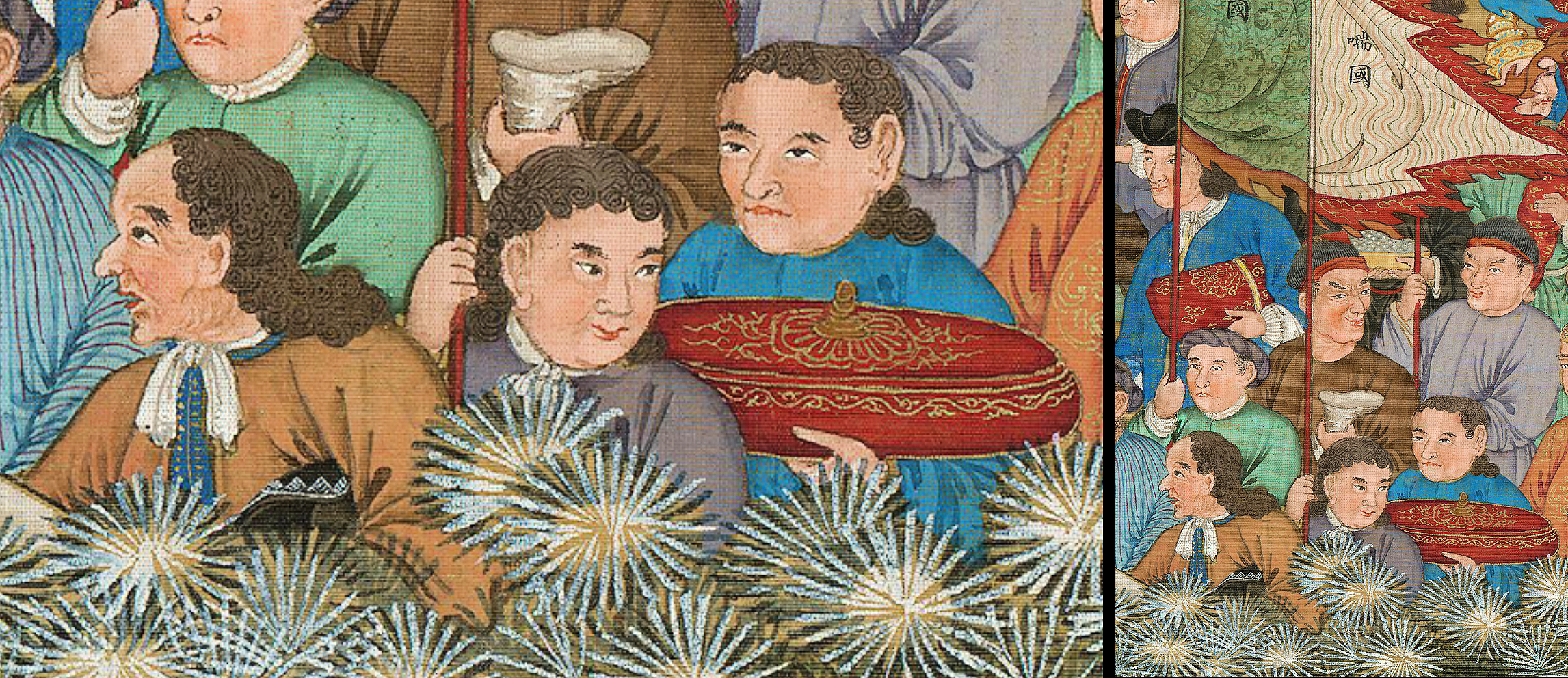
Sweden (瑞國) delegates

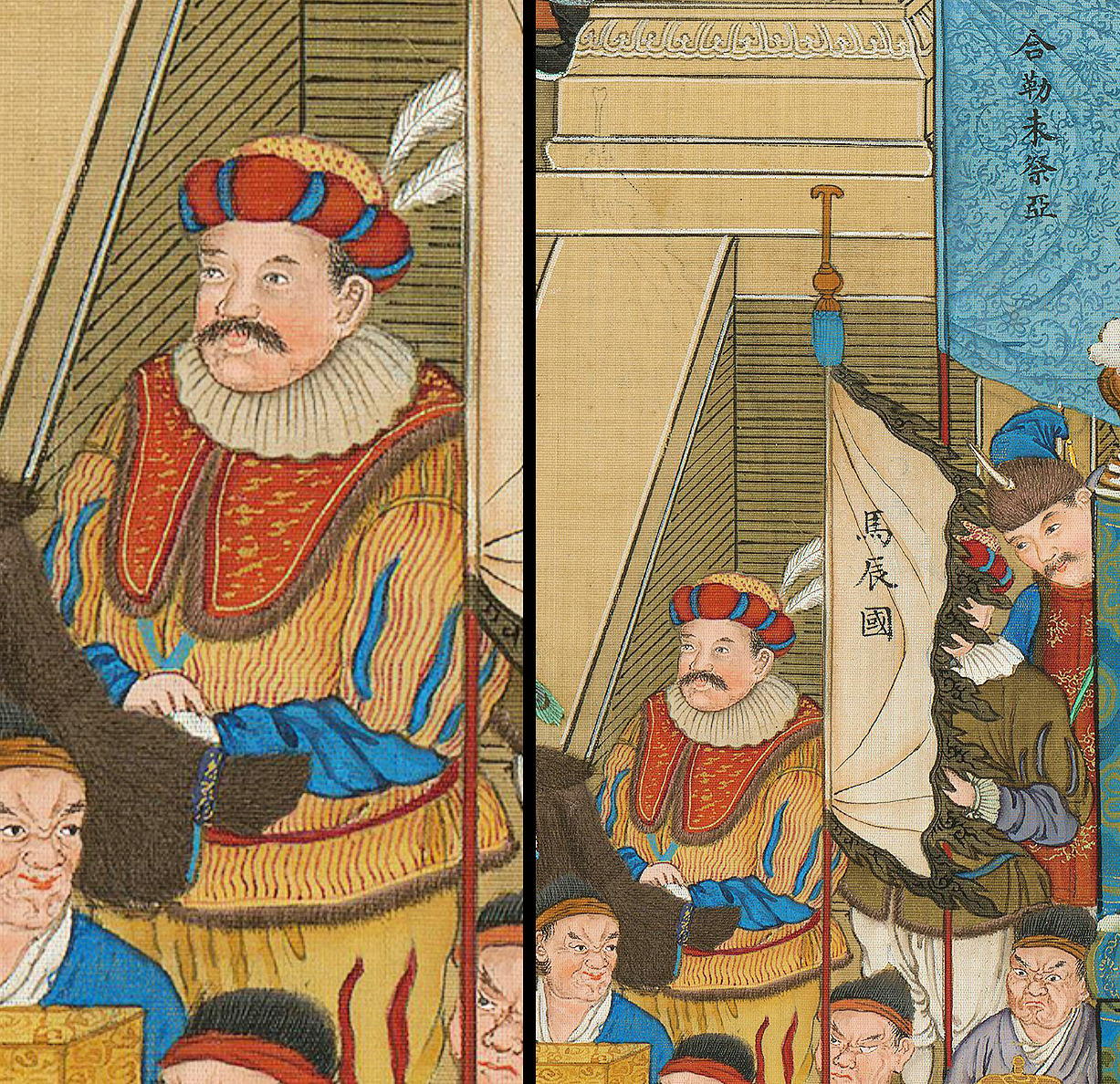
Helvetia (合勒未祭亞) delegates

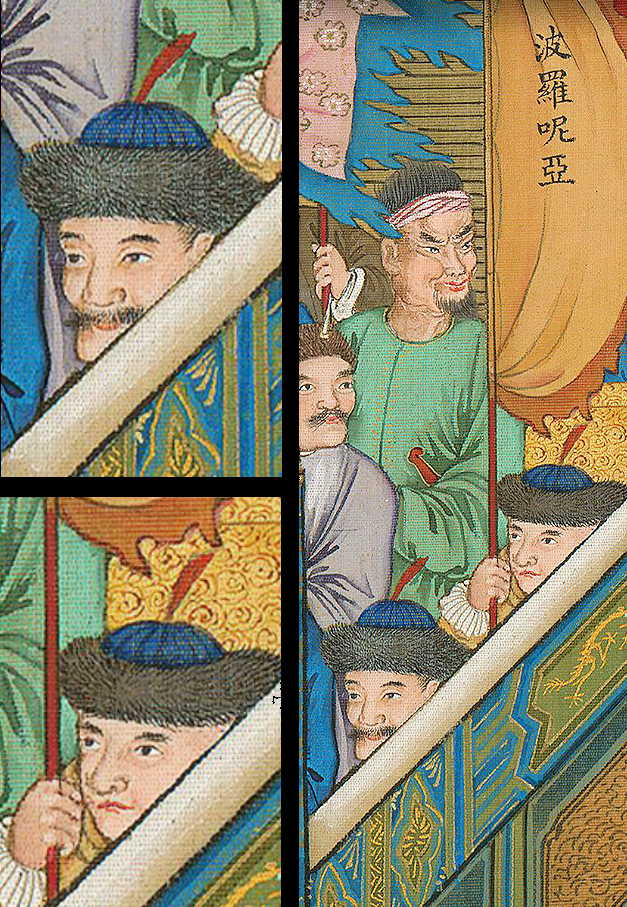
Poland (波羅呢亞) delegates

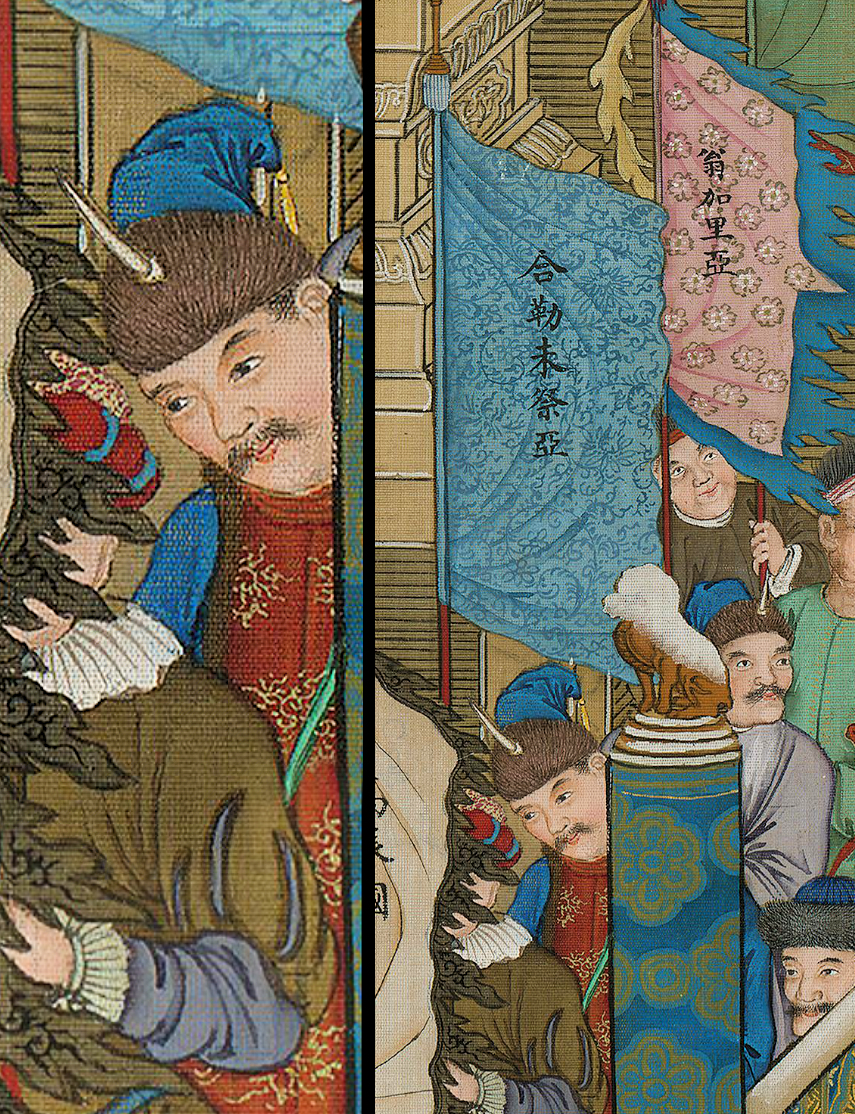
Hungary (翁加里亞) delegates

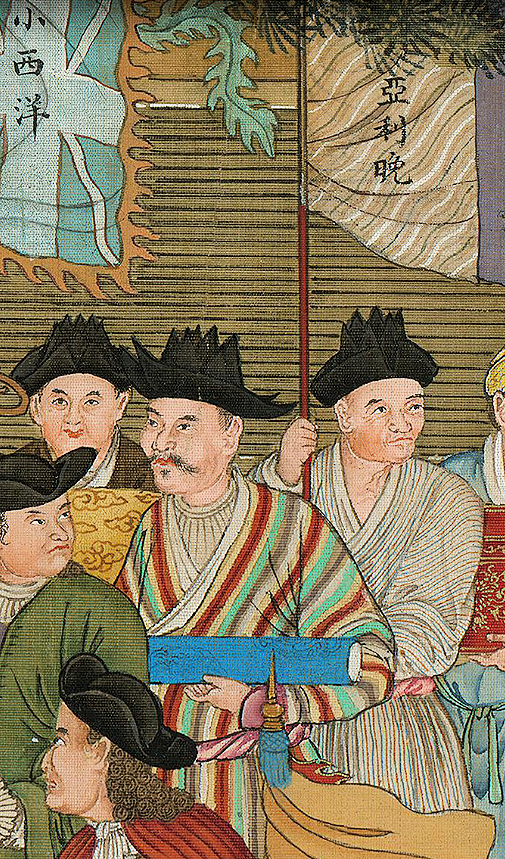
Yerevan (亞利晩) delegates

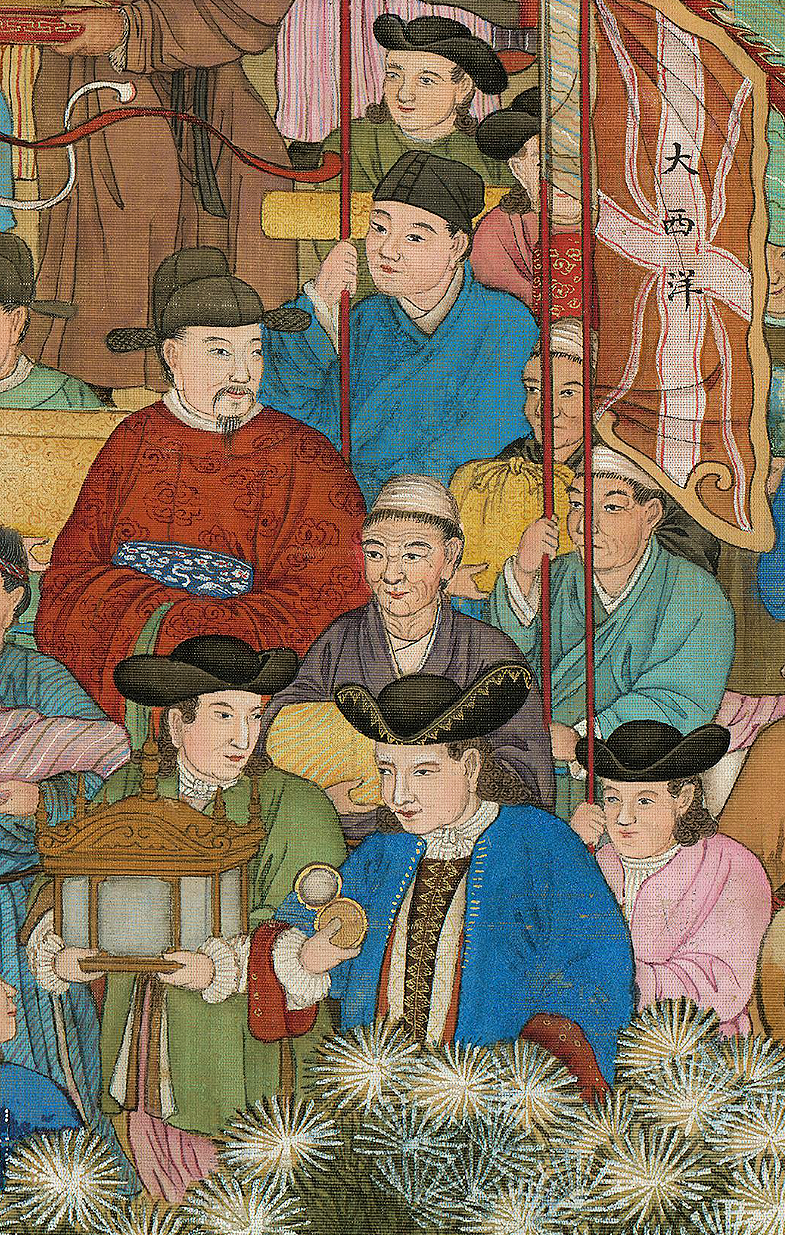
Atlantic Ocean (大西洋, Westerners, nationality unclear) delegates

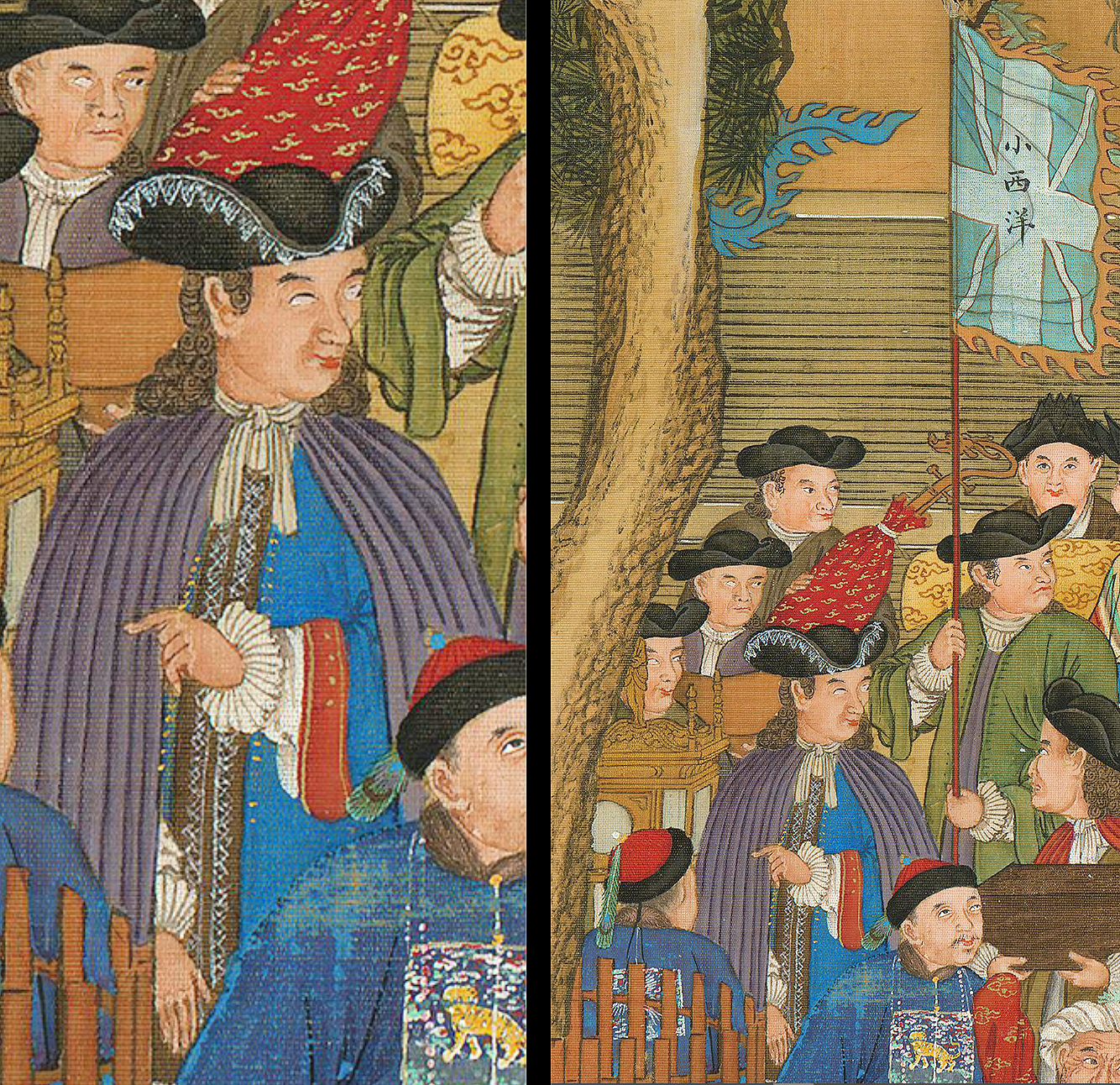
Indian Ocean (小西洋, Westerners, nationality unclear) delegates

== Contemporary popular prints ==
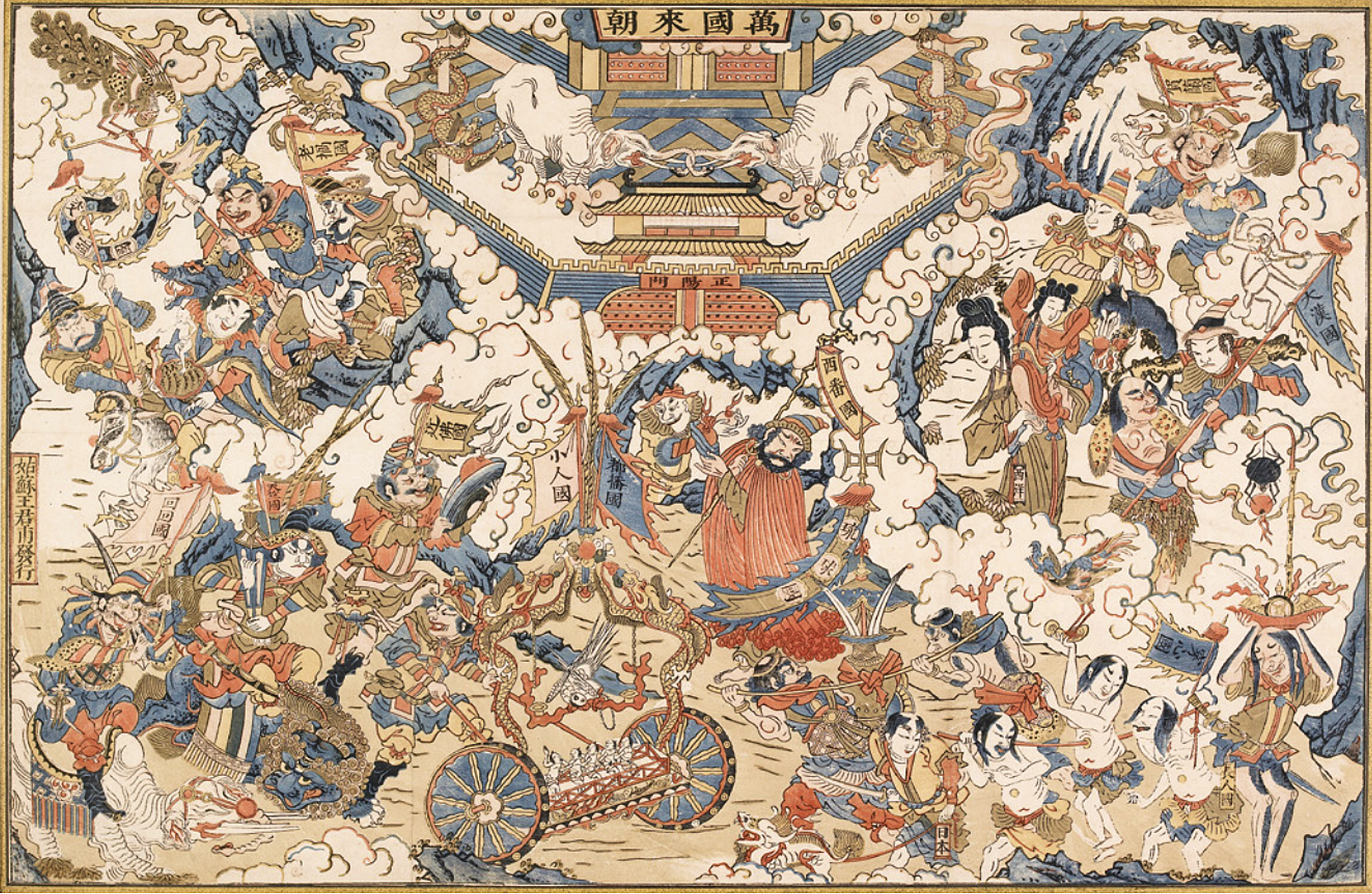
Popular multicolored New Year print (nianhua) entitled "Ten Thousand Countries Coming to Court" (萬國來朝圖), by Wang Junfu (王君甫), mid to late 17th century

While the Imperial Ten Thousand Nations Coming to Pay Tribute is quite realistic and derived from the Jesuit pictorial tradition of Giuseppe Castiglione, this theme also gave rise to some contemporary popular prints with the same title, but a much more caricatural rendering, such as the New Year print (nianhua) by Wang Junfu (王君甫, mid to late 17th century). This reflects the tradition of Chinese folk art with commercial intent, sold to ordinary households for New Lunar Year festivities.

Wang Junfu's Ten Thousand Nations Coming to Pay Tribute (萬國來朝圖) also depicts various foreign countries visiting the Imperial court, but in a rather grotesque manner. Various foreign tribute-bearers arriving at the Zhengyangmen gate of the imperial palace are depicted, but with a much more caricatural understanding of geography and foreign physionomies: the print is crowded with representatives of the "countries of the pygmies" (小人國, xiaoren guo), the people with perforated chests (穿心國, chuanxin guo), Japan (日本), India (天竺, tianzhu guo), the Muslim countries (回回國, huihui guo), Holland (荷蘭, helan), the Giants of Patagonia (長人國, changren guo), and the “Western Ocean” (西洋, xiyang), probably Europe.
