= List of Major National Historical and Cultural Sites in Xinjiang =

This list is of Major Sites Protected for their Historical and Cultural Value at the National Level in the autonomous region of Xinjiang, People's Republic of China.

Site	Chinese name	Location	Designation	Image
Kizil Thousand Buddha Caves	克孜尔千佛洞; Kezi'er Qianfodong	Baicheng County	1-41	Upload file
Kumtura Thousand Buddha Caves	库木吐喇千佛洞; Kumutula Qianfodong	Kuqa County	1-42	Upload file
Gaochang ruins	高昌故城; Gaochang gucheng	Turpan	1-154	Upload file
Jiaohe ruins	雅尔湖故城; Ya'erhu gucheng (交河故城; Jiaohe gucheng)	Turpan	1-155	Upload file
Bezeklik Thousand Buddha Caves	柏孜克里克千佛洞; Bozikelike Qianfodong	Turpan	2-14	Upload file
Emin Minaret	苏公塔; Sugong ta	Turpan	3-159	Upload file
Loulan	楼兰故城遗址; Loulan gucheng yizhi	Ruoqiang County	3-211	Upload file
Beshbalik Ruins	北庭故城遗址; Beiting gucheng yizhi	Jimsar County	3-217	Upload file
Astana Cemetery	阿斯塔那古墓群; Asitana gumuqun	Turpan	3-241	Upload file
Afaq Khoja Mausoleum	阿巴和加麻札(墓); Abahejia mazha	Kashgar	3-258	Upload file
Niya ruins	尼雅遗址; Niya yizhi	Minfeng County	4-41	Upload file
Subashi Temple ruins	苏巴什佛寺遗址; Subashi Fosi yizhi	Kuqa County	4-45	Upload file
Yili Commandery	伊犁将军府; Yili jiangjun fu	Huocheng County	4-188	Upload file
Senmusaimu Thousand Buddha Caves	森木塞姆千佛洞; Senmusaimu Qianfodong	Kuqa County	4-189	Upload file
Nulasai Copper Mine	奴拉赛铜矿遗址; Nulasai tongkuang yizhi	Nilka County	5-129	Upload file
Yuansha Ruins	圆沙古城; Yuansha gucheng	Keriya County	5-130	Upload file
Kizilgaha Beacon	克孜尔尕哈烽燧; Kezi'ergaha fengsui	Kuqa County	5-131	Upload file
Konqi Beacon	孔雀河烽燧群; Kongque He fengsui qun	Yuli County	5-132	Upload file
South Lopnor Ruins	罗布泊南古城遗址; Luobubo nan gucheng yizhi	Ruoqiang County	5-133	Upload file
Mo'er Temple Ruins	莫尔寺遗址; Mo'er si yizhi	Shufu County	5-134	Upload file
Tuokuzisalai Ruins	托库孜萨来遗址; Tuokuzisalai yizhi	Tumxuk	5-135	Upload file
Miran	米兰遗址; Milan yizhi	Ruoqiang County	5-136	Upload file
Andier Ruins	安迪尔古城遗址; Andi'er gucheng yizhi	Minfeng County	5-137	Upload file
Tashkurgan Ruins	石头城遗址; Shitou cheng yizhi	Tashkurgan Tajik Autonomous County 塔什库尔干塔吉克自治县	5-138	Upload file
Qigexing Buddhist Temple Ruins	七个星佛寺遗址; Qigexing Fosi yizhi	Yanqi Hui Autonomous County	5-139	Upload file
Rewake Buddhist Temple Ruins	热瓦克佛寺遗址; Rewake Fosi yizhi	Lop County	5-140	Upload file
Baiyanggou Buddhist Temple Ruins	白杨沟佛寺遗址; Baiyanggou Fosi yizhi	Hami	5-141	Upload file
Dahe Ancient City	大河古城; Dahe gucheng	Barköl Kazakh Autonomous County	5-142	Upload file
Wulabo Ancient City	乌拉泊古城; Wulabo gucheng	Ürümqi	5-143	Upload file
Taizang Pagoda	台藏塔遗址; Taizang ta yizhi	Turpan	5-144	Upload file
Sanhaizi Tumulus & Deerstone	三海子墓葬及鹿石; Sanhaizi muzang ji lushi	Qinggil County	5-188	Upload file
Yanbulaq Tombs	焉不拉克古墓群; Yanbulake gumuqun	Hami	5-189	Upload file
Chawuhu Tombs	察吾乎古墓群; Chawuhu gumuqun	Hejing County	5-190	Upload file
Qiemuer Qieke Stone Figures & Graves	切木尔切克石人及石棺墓群; Qiemuer Qieke shiren ji shiguan muqun	Altay City	5-191	Upload file
Zaghunluq Tombs	扎滚鲁克古墓群; Zhagunluke gumuqun	Qiemo County	5-192	Upload file
Shanpula Tombs	山普拉古墓群; Shanpula gumuqun	Lop County	5-193	Upload file
Tughluq Temür Mausoleum	吐虎鲁克•铁木尔汗麻扎; Tuhuluke•Tiemu'er han mazha	Huocheng County	5-194	Upload file
Zhaosu Shengyou Temple	昭苏圣佑庙; Zhaosu Shengyou miao	Zhaosu County	5-439	Upload file
Id Kah Mosque	艾提尕尔清真寺; Aitiga'er qingzhensi	Kashgar	5-440	Upload file
Kizilgaha Caves	克孜尔尕哈石窟; Kezi'ergaha shiku	Kuqa County	5-472	Upload file
Stone Tablet of Quelling Zhungar Leming	平定准噶尔勒铭碑; Pingding Zhunga'er Leming bei	Zhaosu County	5-473	Upload file
Dandan Oilik	丹丹乌里克遗址; Dandanwulike yizhi	Qira County	6-218	Upload file
Mazhatage Fort	麻扎塔格戍堡址; Mazhatage shubao zhi	Karakax County	6-219	Upload file
Tonggusibashi Ancient City	通古斯巴西城址; Tonggusibaxi chengzhi	Toksu County	6-220	Upload file
Loulan Tombs	楼兰墓群; Loulan muqun	Ruoqiang County	6-289	Upload file
Wubao Tombs	五堡墓群; Wubao muqun	Hami	6-290	Upload file
Yanghai Tombs	洋海墓群; Yanghai muqun	Piqan County	6-291	Upload file
Arixate Stone Figure Tombs	阿日夏特石人墓; Arixiate shiren mu	Wenquan County	6-292	Upload file
Grave of Mahmud al-Kashgari	麻赫穆德•喀什噶里墓; Mahemude•Kashigali mu	Shufu County	6-293	Upload file
Sultan Waisi Khan Mausoleum	速檀•歪思汗麻扎; Sutan•Waisi han mazha	Yining County	6-294	Upload file
Tombs of the Yarkand Khans	叶尔羌汗国王陵; Yerqiang hanguo wangling	Yarkant County	6-295	Upload file
Aibifu Aijiemu Mausoleum	艾比甫•艾洁木麻扎; Aibifu•Aijiemu mazha	Artux	6-296	Upload file
Tomb of Hami Islamic King	哈密回王墓; Hami Hui wangmu	Hami	6-297	Upload file
Jingyuan Temple	靖远寺; Jingyuan si	Qapqal Xibe Autonomous County	6-809	Upload file
Toyuq Caves	吐峪沟石窟; Tuyugou shiku	Piqan County	6-873	Upload file
Turpan water system	坎尔井地下水利工程; Kan'erjing dixia shuili gongcheng	Turpan	6-1077	Upload file
Red Building of Tacheng	塔城红楼; Tacheng honglou	Tacheng	6-1078	Upload file
Former center of political and cultural activities of the government of the Ili Rebellion	三区革命政府政治文化活动中心旧址; Sanqu geming zhengfu zhengzhi wenhua huodong zhongxin jiuzhi	Yining City	6-1079	Upload file

== See also ==
- Principles for the Conservation of Heritage Sites in China
