= Devata =

Hindu and Buddhist term for deity

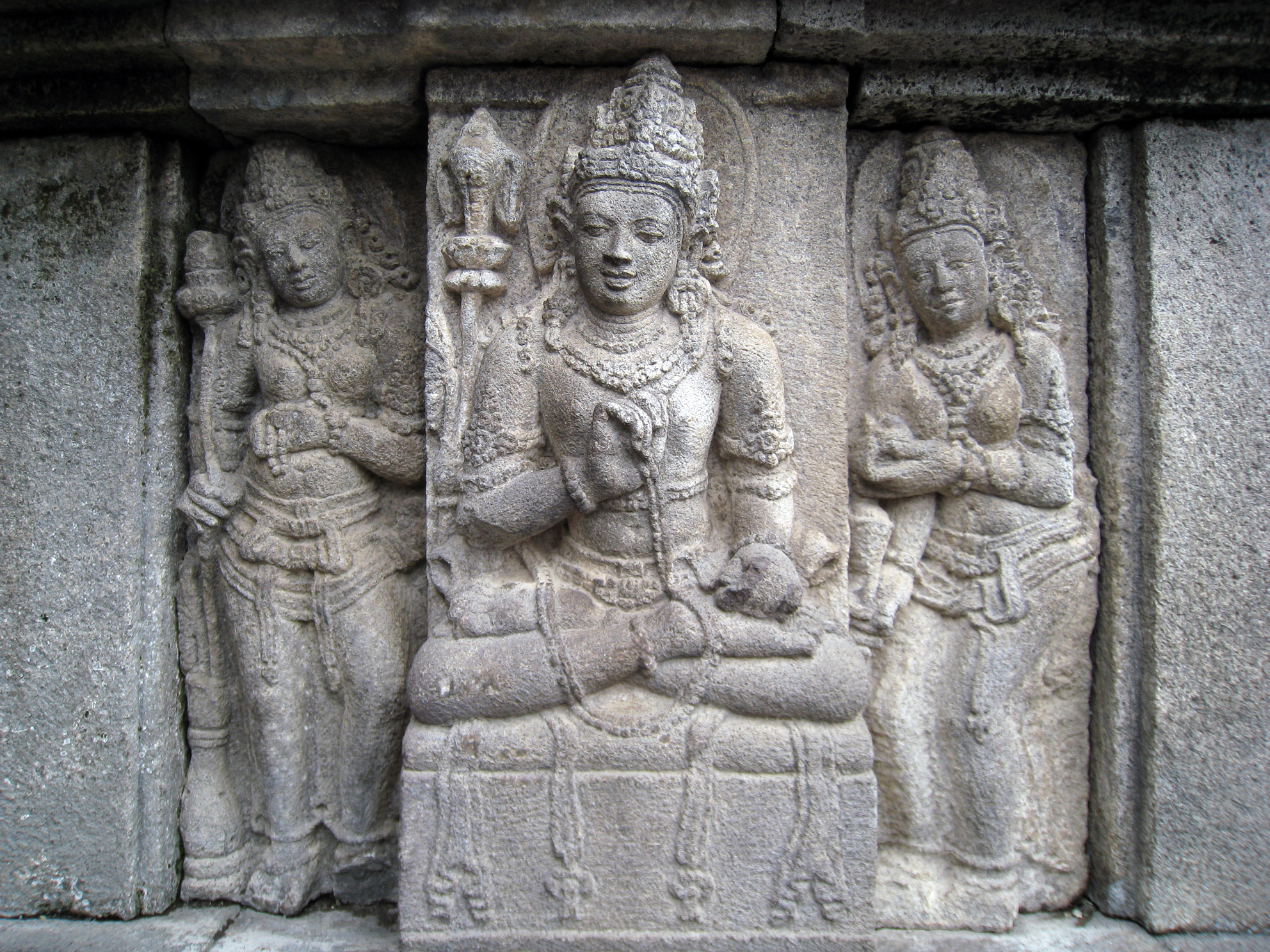
A male devata, flanked by a two apsaras in Prambanan, Indonesia

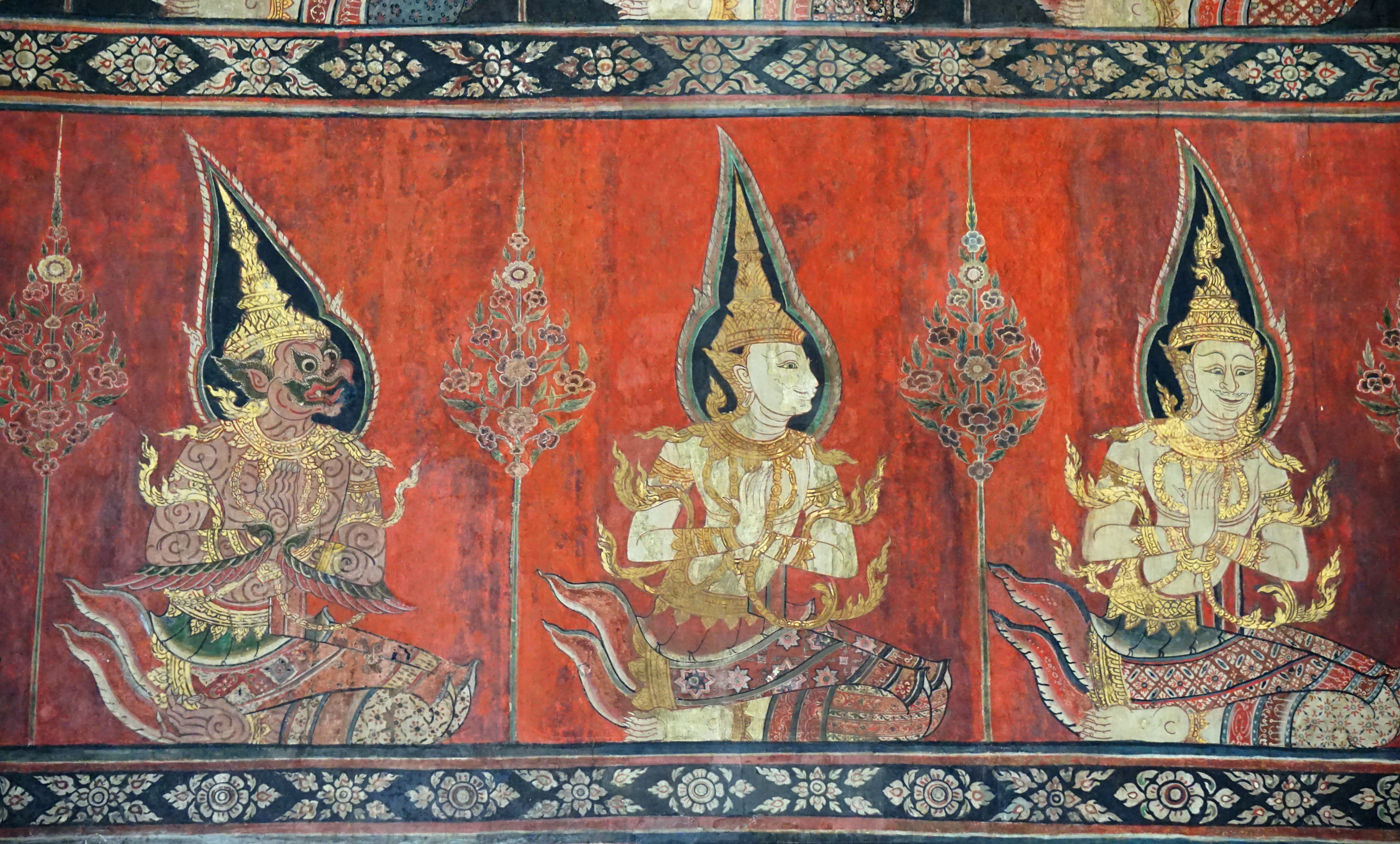
A mural depicting devatas and a yaksha in Phutthaisawan Chapel, Thailand

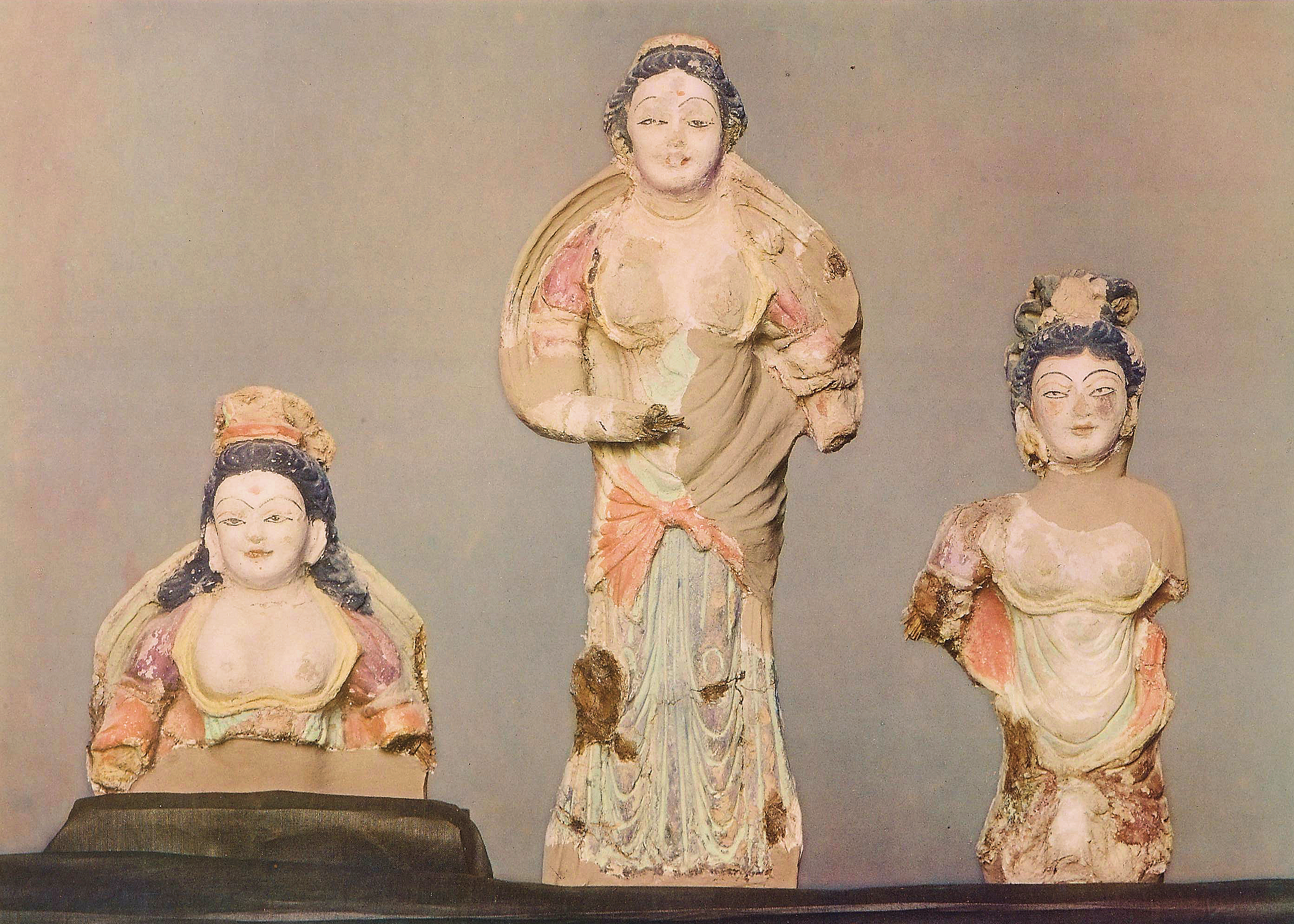
Statuettes of devatas, Kumtura Caves, China

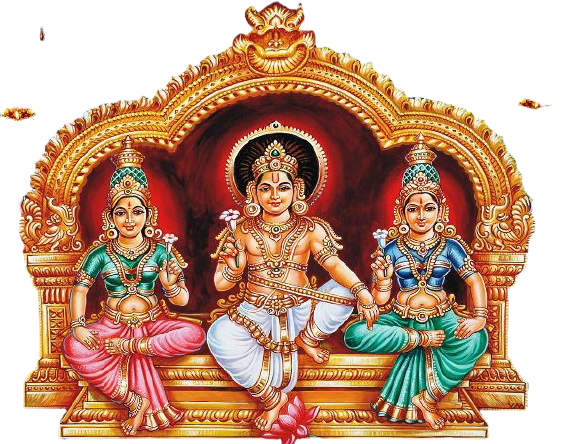
Aiyanar, a kula-devata of South India, and his consorts

Devata (pl: devatas, meaning 'the gods') (Note: Devanagari: देवता; Khmer: ទេវតា (tevoda); Thai: เทวดา (RTGS: thewada); Sinhalese: දෙවිවරු (dewiwaru); Balinese, Sundanese, Malay: dewata; Javanese: déwata or jawata; Batak languages: debata (Toba), dibata (Karo), naibata (Simalungun); diwata (Philippine languages)) are smaller and more focused Devas (Deities) in Indian religions, such as Hinduism and Buddhism. The term "devata" itself can also mean deva. They can be either male or female. Every human activity has its devata, its spiritual counterpart or aspect.

== Types ==
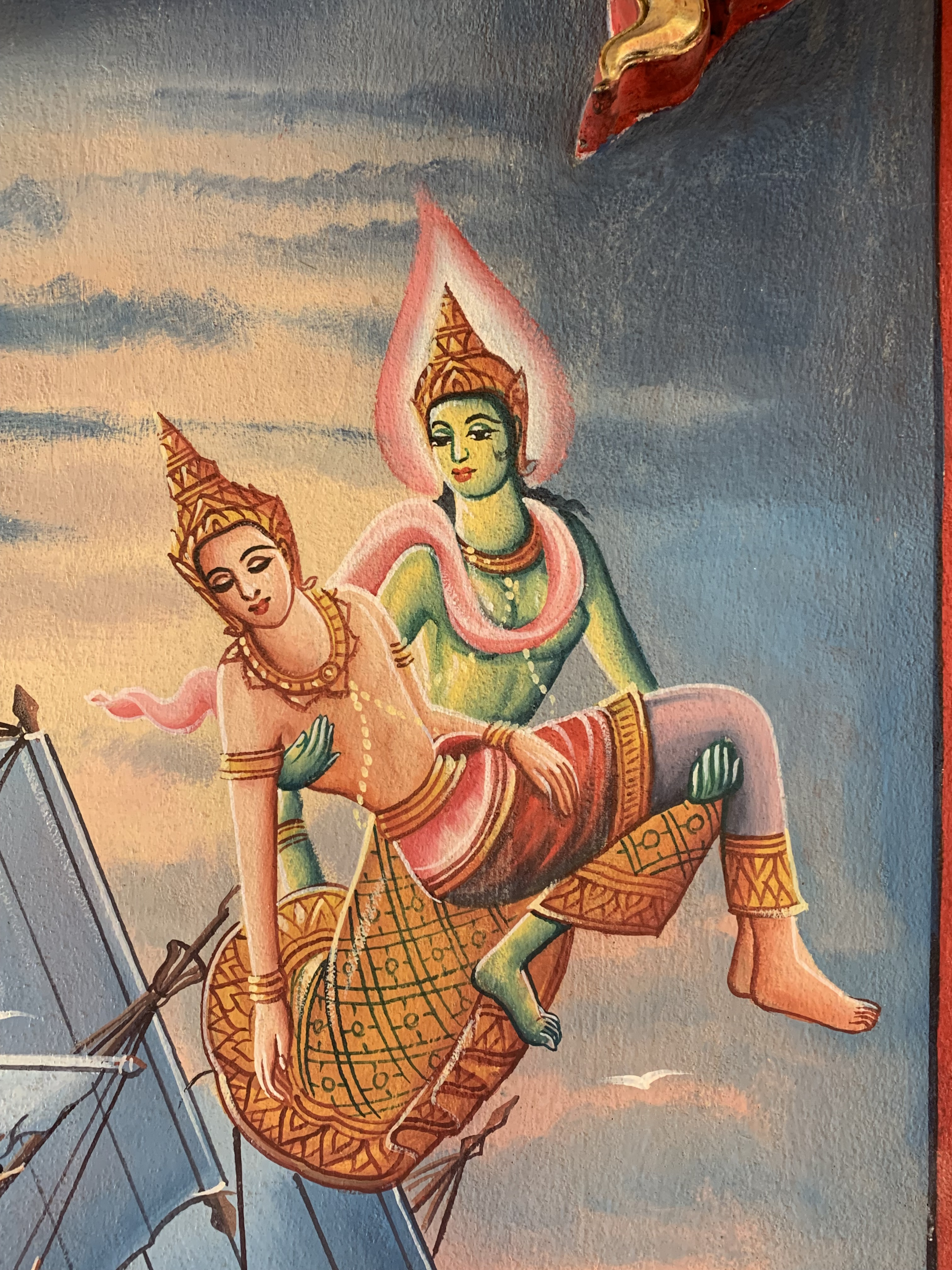
Manimekhala, a devata in Theravada Buddhism, depicted here in a Thai temple

There are many kinds of devatas: vanadevatas (forest spirits, perhaps descendants of early nature-spirit cults), gramadevata (village gods), devatas of river crossings, caves, mountains, and so on. For example, in the Konkan region of India, Hindu devatas are often divided into five categories:

1. Grama devatas or village deities who could be the founder deity such as Jathera or ancestral worship of Bali, and examples include Santoshi, Renuka, Aiyanar
2. Sthana devatas or local deities, for example, those in certain places of pilgrimage like Rama in Nasik, Vithoba in Pandharpur, Krishna at Dwarka, Kali at Kolkata, Mahalakshmi at Kolhapur, Devi Kanya Kumari at Kanyakumari
3. Kula devatas or family deities, like Khanderai and Muniandi
4. Ishta devatas or chosen deities
5. Vastu devatas or Gruha devatas, a class of deities that preside over the house.

Following are some of the important types of Dewatas in Sri Lankan Buddhism:

- Bandara Dewatawo are dewatas of trees, mountains, etc.
- Gambara Dewatawo are dewatas of the villages
- Loka Dewatawo are dewatas of planets

== Scriptures ==
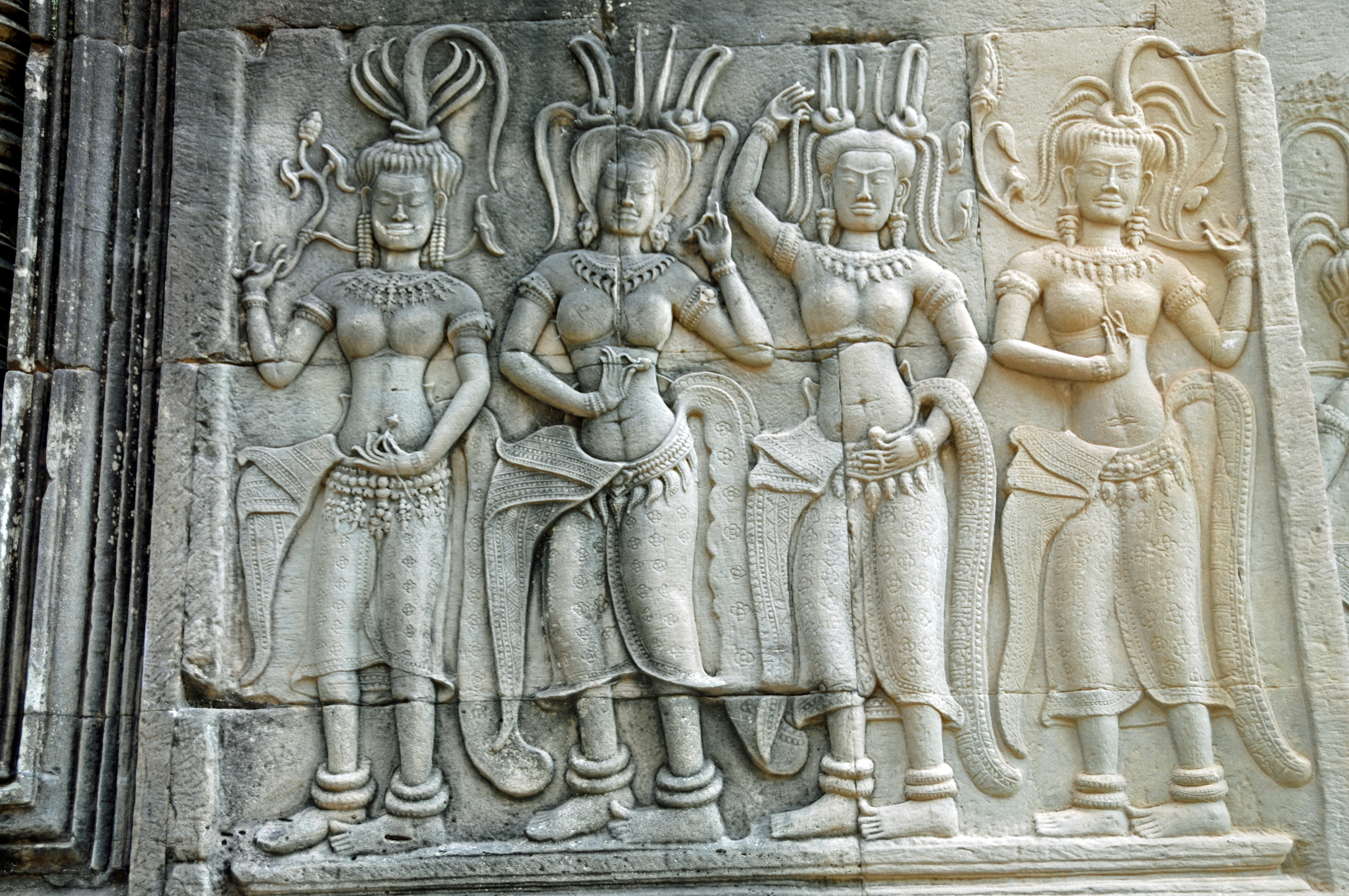
Apsaras relief on Angkor Wat, Cambodia

Some well-known Hindu-Buddhist heavenly beings belong to the group of devatas, such as apsaras or vidhyadaris (female cloud and water spirits) and their male counterparts, the gandharvas (heavenly musicians). Devatas often occur in many Buddhist Jatakas, Hindu epics such as the Ramayana and the Mahabharata and in many other Buddhist holy scriptures. The island of Bali is nicknamed Pulau Dewata (Indonesian: "islands of devata or island of gods") because of its vivid Hindu culture and traditions. In Indonesia, the term hyang is equivalent to devata. In Hinduism, the devatas that guard the eight, nine and ten cardinal points are called Lokapala (Guardians of the Directions) or, more specifically in Balinese Hindu tradition, Dewata Nawa Sanga.

== See also ==
- Demigod
- Surya Majapahit
- Diwata
