= Simsim Caves =

Buddhist caves in Kucha, Xinjiang, China

Coordinates: 41.7683°N 83.3989°E

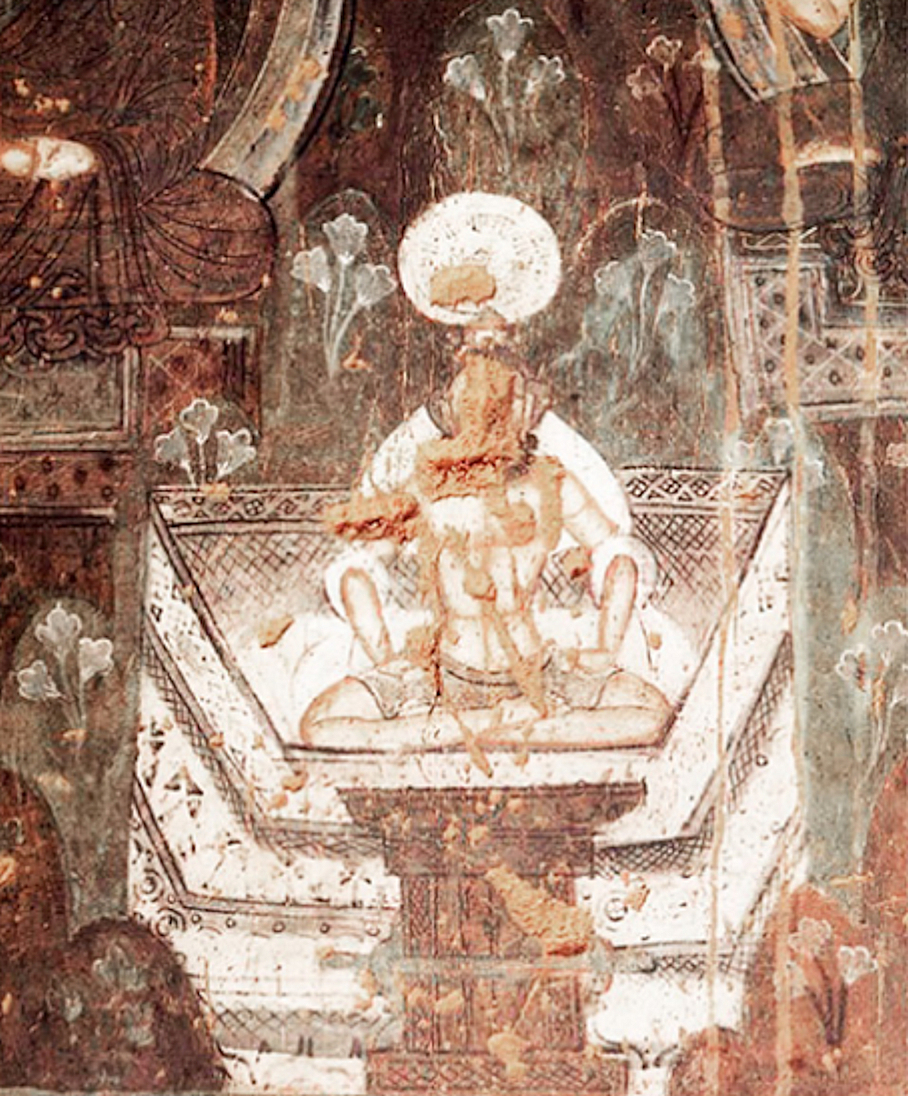
Painting from Simsim Cave 48.

The Simsim Caves, also called the Caves of Senmusaimu (Chinese: 森木塞姆石窟; pinyin: Sēnmùsāimǔ shíkū), are decorated Buddhist caves in the area of Kucha, Tarim Basin, China. Other famous sites nearby are the Ah-ai Grotto, Kizil Caves, the Kizilgaha Caves, the Kumtura Caves, and Subashi Temple.

== Sources ==
- Zhongguo Xinjiang Bihua Quanji 5: Keziergaha Senmusaimu 中国新疆壁画全集 5: 克孜尔尕哈 森木赛姆 [Complete Collection of Xinjiang Murals 5: Keziergaha Senmusaimu Grottoes] 中国壁画全集编辑委员会 Zhongguo Bihua Quanji Bianji Weiyuanhui. Tianjin, 1995; ISBN 7531412969 (Tianjin Renmin Meishu 天津人民美术)
- Peter Hopkirk: Foreign Devils on the Silk Road: The Search for the Lost Cities and Treasures of Chinese Central Asia. The University of Massachusetts Press, Amherst 1980, ISBN 0-87023-435-8.
- Zhongguo da baike quanshu: Kaoguxue. Beijing: Zhongguo da baike quanshu chubanshe, 1986
