= Altyn Mosque =

Mosque in Yarkant, Xinjiang, China

- 阿尔丁清真寺
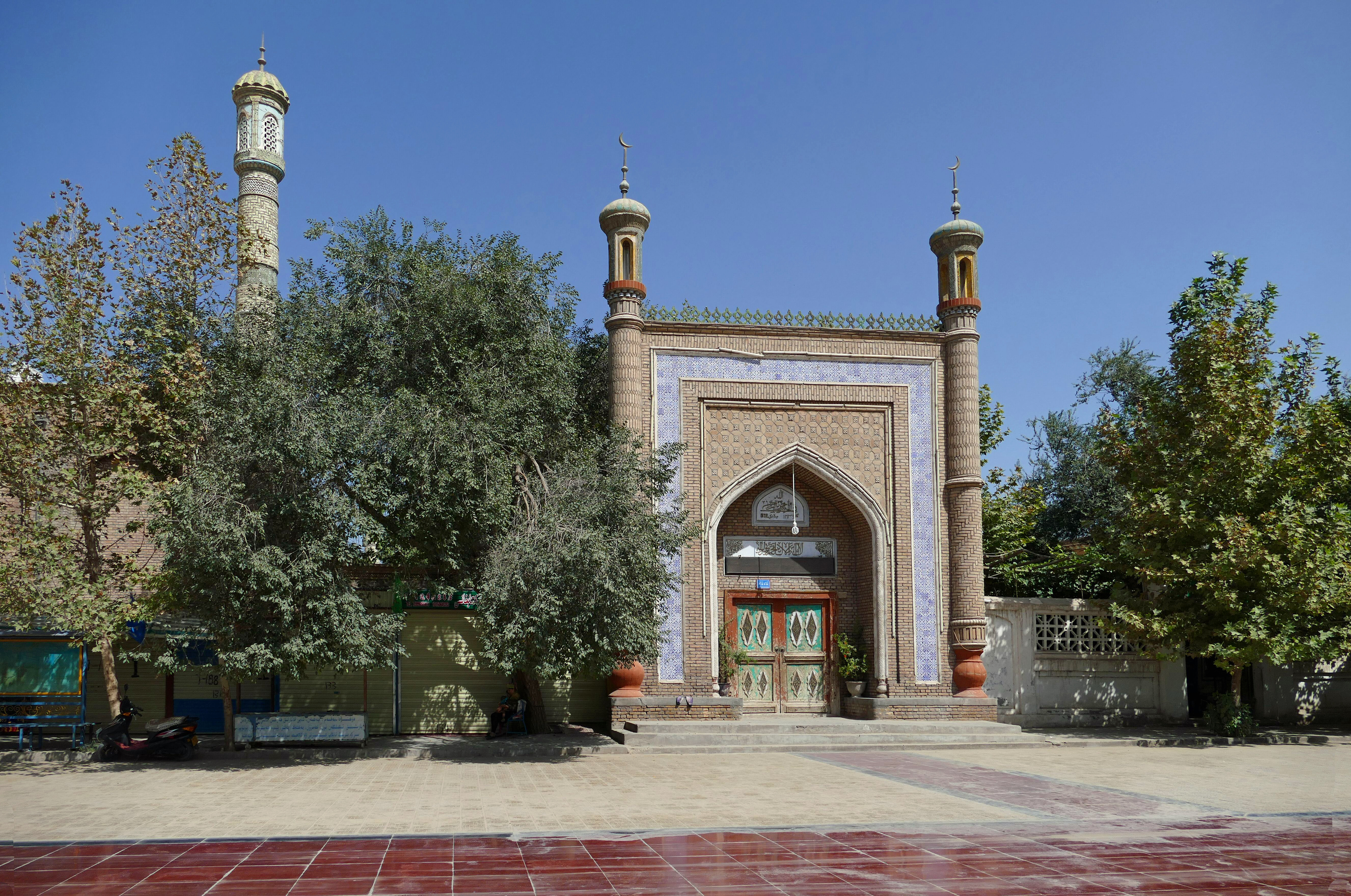

- Location of the mosque in Xinjiang

Religion
- Affiliation: Sunni Islam
- Ecclesiastical or organizational status: Mosque
- Status: Active

Location
- Location: Yarkant, Xinjiang
- Country: China
- Interactive map of Altyn Mosque
- Coordinates: 38°24′57″N 77°15′16″E

Architecture
- Type: Mosque
- Minaret: 1

Chinese name
- Simplified Chinese: 阿尔丁清真寺
- Traditional Chinese: 阿爾丁清真寺
Transcriptions
Standard Mandarin
- Hanyu Pinyin: Ā'ěrdīng Qīngzhēnsì

Major cultural heritage sites under national-level protection
- Official name: Tombs of the Yarkand Khans 叶尔羌汗国王陵
- Type: Cultural
- Criteria: Religion
- Reference no.: 6-295

The Altyn Mosque (simplified Chinese: 阿尔丁清真寺; traditional Chinese: 阿爾丁清真寺; pinyin: Ā'ěrdīng Qīngzhēnsì) is a mosque in Yarkand in Yarkant County, in the Xinjiang autonomous region of China.

It is noted for its painted ceilings and the tomb of the poet Amannisa Khan (1526–60) which is in its sahn. She was the wife of one of the local Khans.

Beyond the mosque is a cemetery housing the Tombs of the Yarkand Khans, listed as a Chinese major cultural heritage site.

== Gallery ==
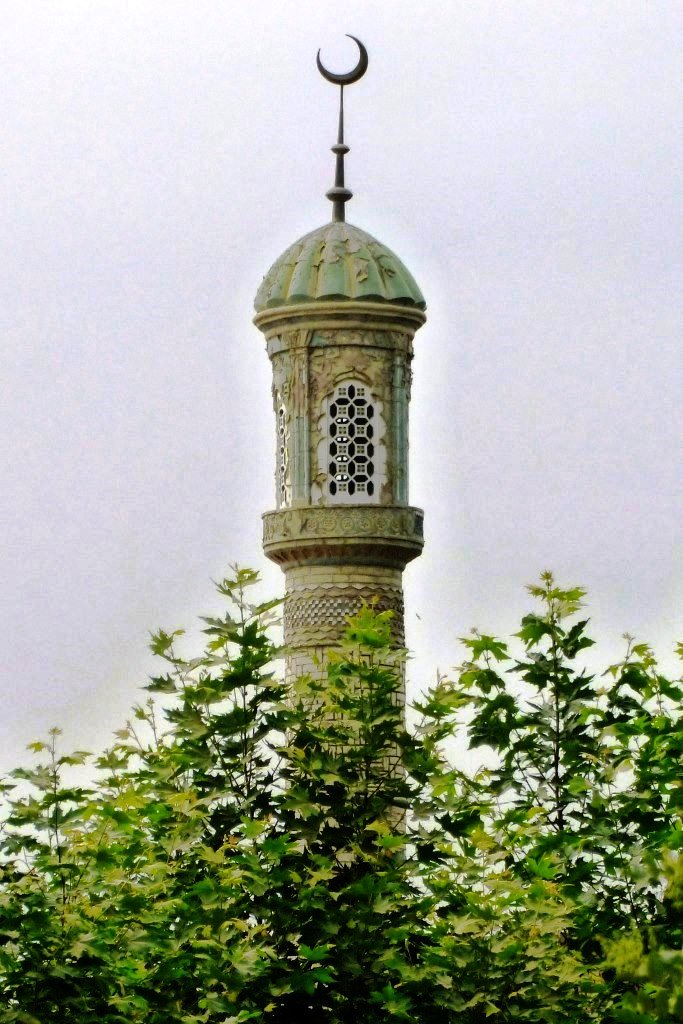
The minaret

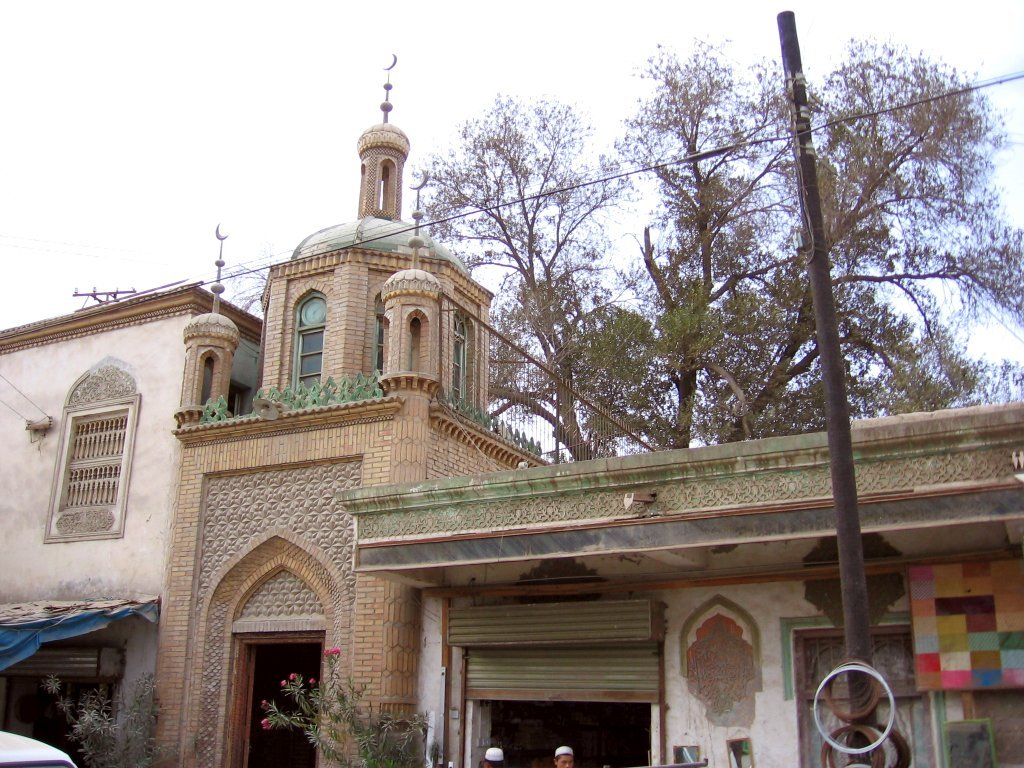
Mosque detail, in 2015

== See also ==
- Islam in China
- List of mosques in China
- List of Major National Historical and Cultural Sites in Xinjiang
