= Ah-ai Grotto =

Buddhist rock-cut cave in Xinjiang

- Interactive map of Ah-ai Grotto
- Location: Xinjiang, China
- Discovery: Discovered by Tudi Azze in 1999
- Entrances: 1

The Ah-ai Grotto (Chinese: 阿艾石窟; pinyin: Ā ài shíkū) is a small, standalone Buddhist rock-cut cave located in the Kyziliya Grand Canyon, Kuqa, Xinjiang. The area is under the administration of Ah-ai Town, hence its name. The grotto was discovered by a young Uyghur shepherd named Tudi Azze (吐地阿孜) in April 1999, while on his way to collecting medicinal herbs.

Compared with other famous sites in Xinjiang, such as Bezeklik Caves or Kizil Caves, the small Ah-ai Grotto is not widely known. The cave murals have suffered from vandalism.

== The grotto ==
Built in the 8th century, financially supported by devoted laities, the cave was a product of a flourishing period of Kuchean Buddhism. The Vairocana image presented in the mural denotes an Esoteric Buddhist influence from the Tang dynasty.

The cave is 4.6 metres long, 3.4 metres wide and about 2.5 metres high, with a vertical rectangle plane and a lunette vault. A rectangular earthen altar lies at the centre of the ground, measuring 2.53 metres long, 2.05 metres wide and 0.45 metres high. Due to the poor conservation condition, only one-tenth of the murals survived to the present day. A partially survived Amitayurdhyana Sutra Transformation is depicted on the front wall, with its style similar to the Dunhuang murals. Of the five remaining figures on the left side wall, four have been identified as Bhaisajyaguru, Vairocana, Manjushri and another Bhaisajyaguru. It is impossible to identify the three figures—two standing bodhisattvas and one sitting buddha—on the right side wall due to their severe damage. The vaulted ceiling is filled with small sitting Buddha images.

The artistic presentation of Ah-ai Grotto reflects a cultural amalgamation of East Central Asia and Tang dynasty, and the influence of Mahayana Buddhism upon Kucha, which was a Sarvastivada-dominated kingdom.

== Gallery ==
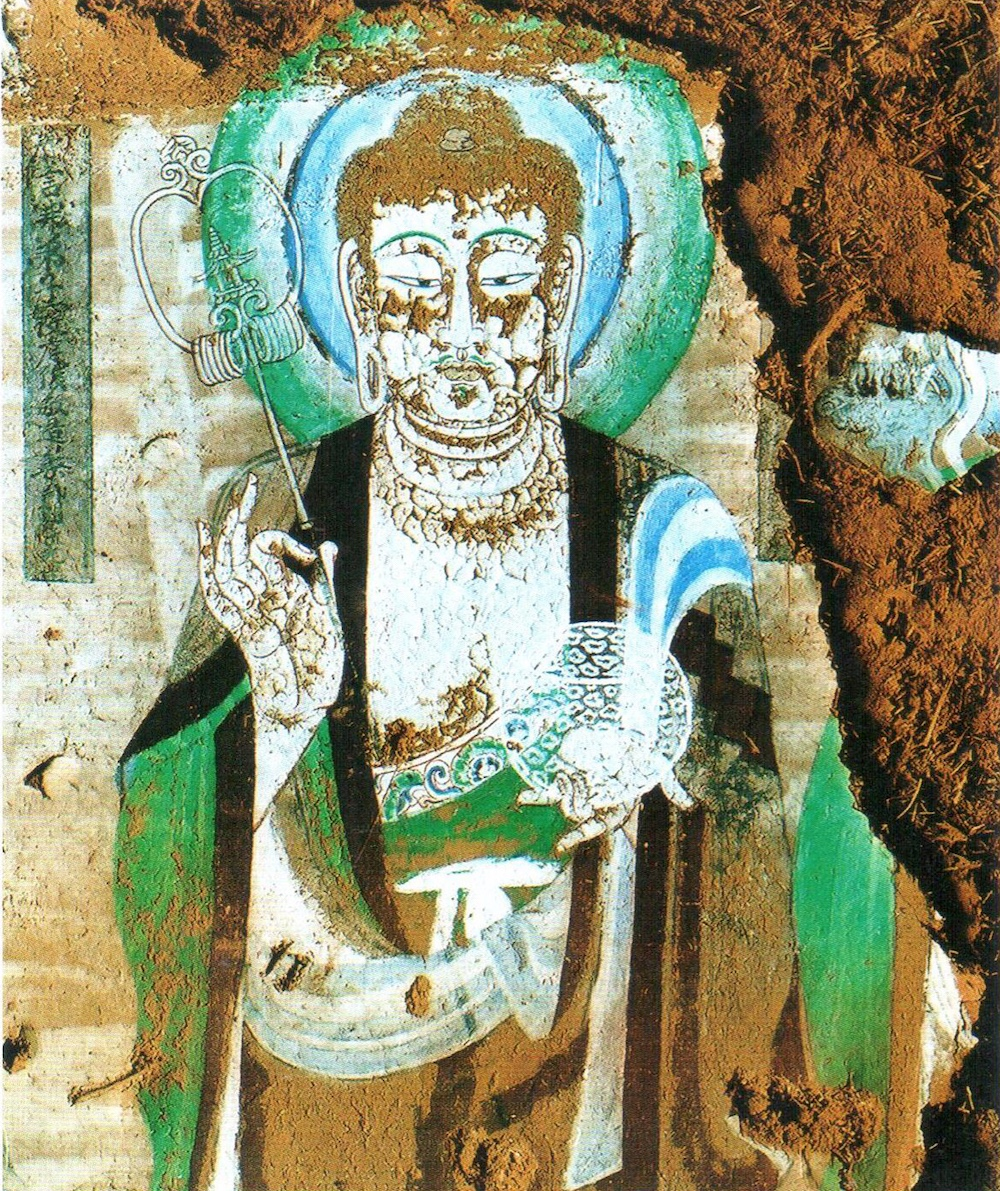
Bhaisajyaguru

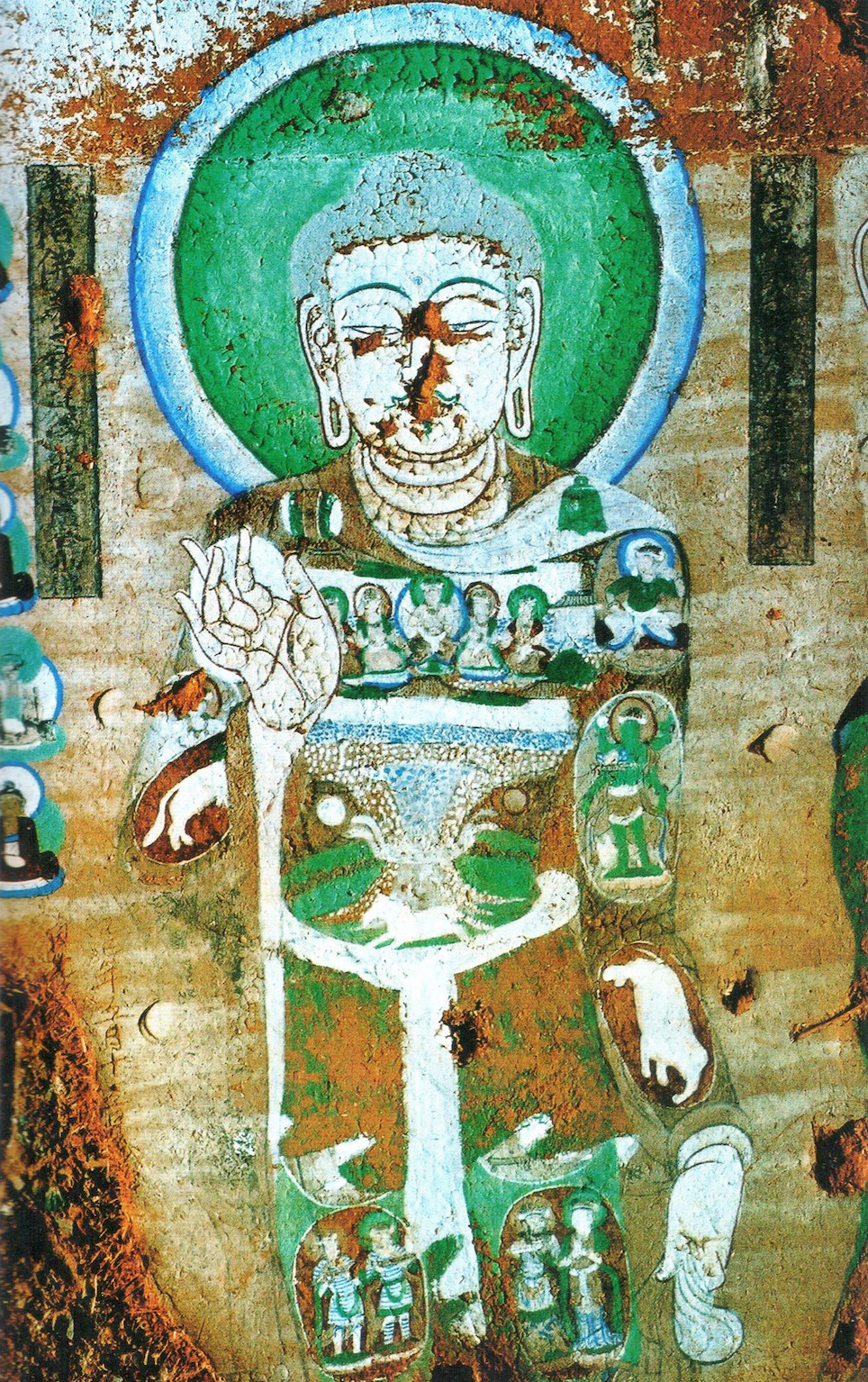
Vairocana

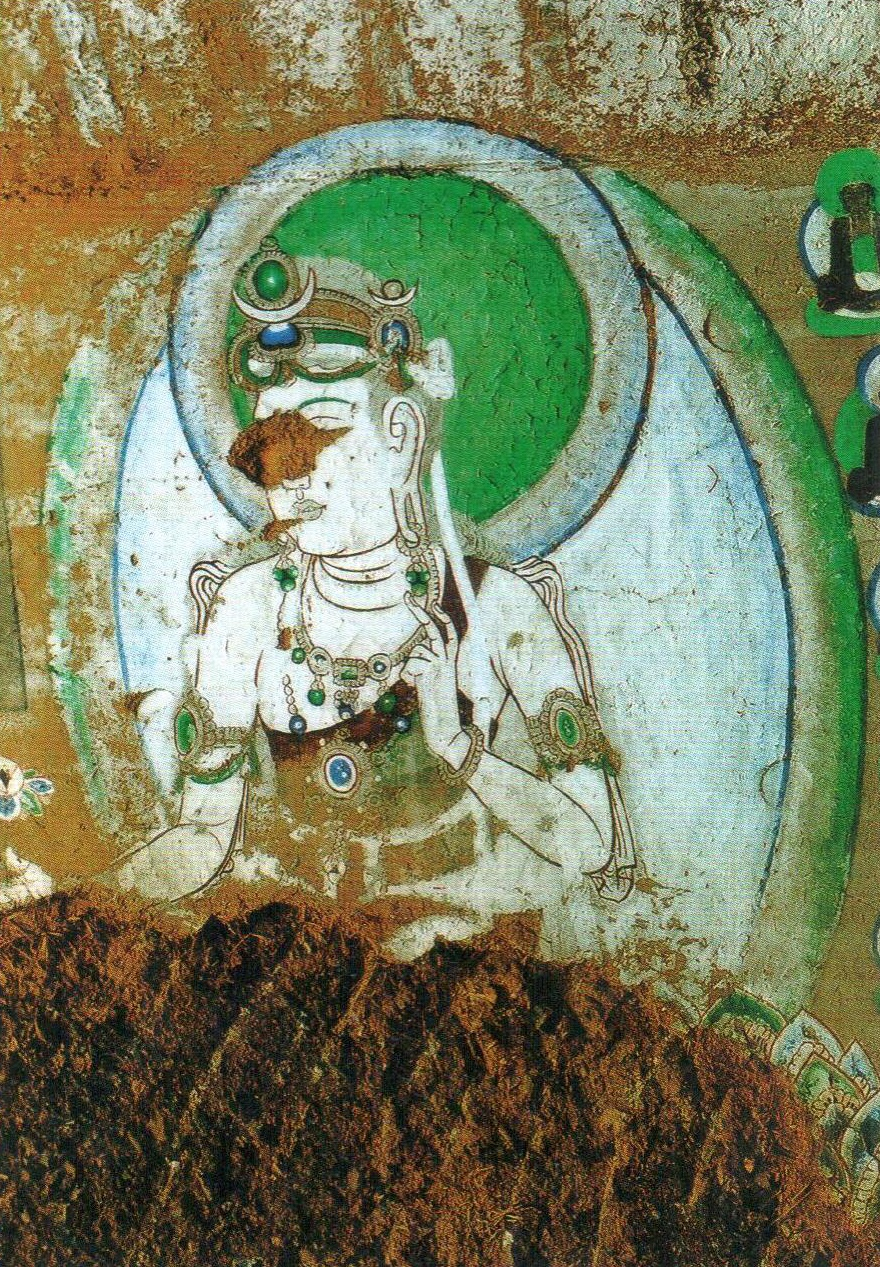
Manjushri

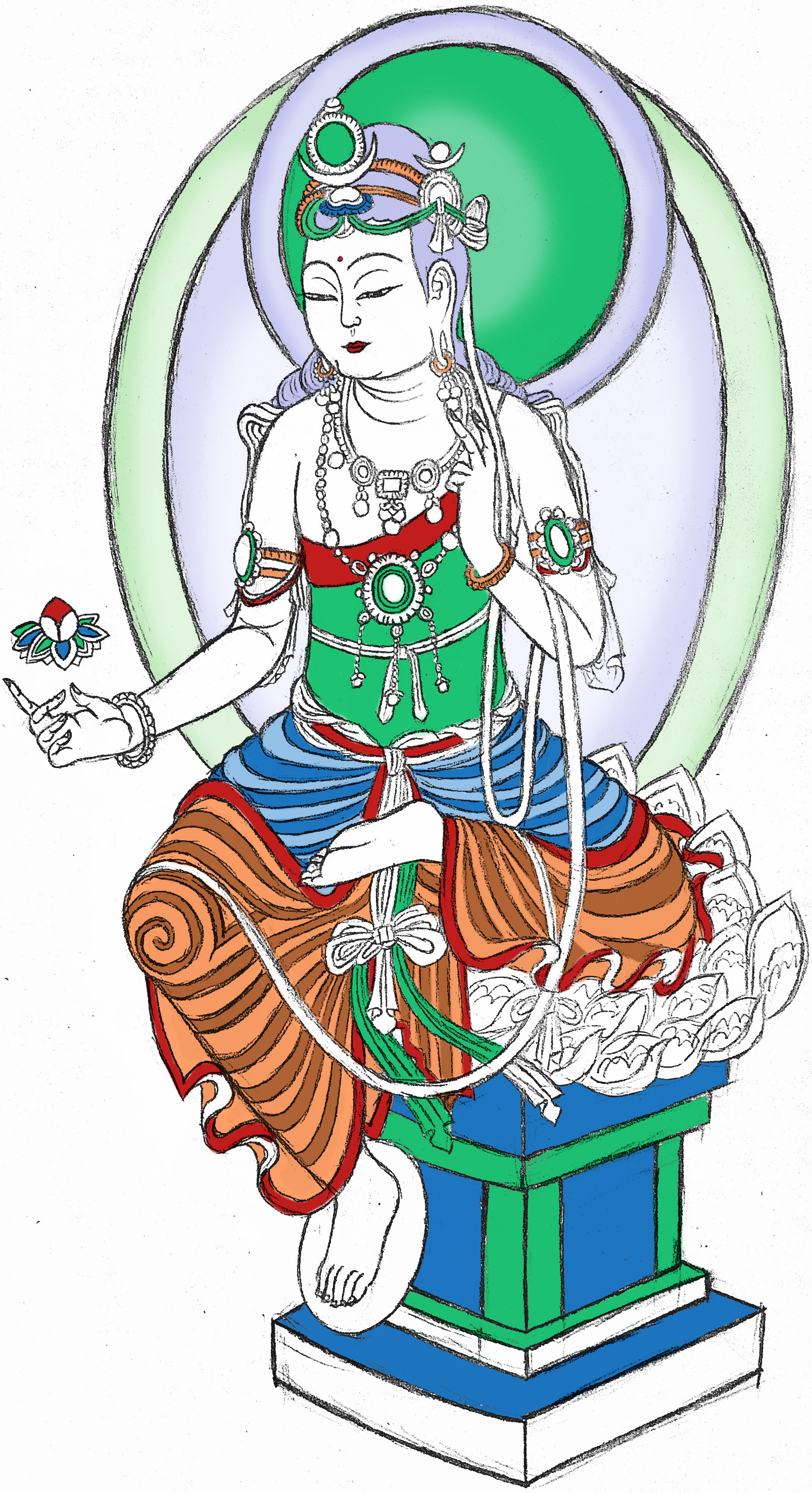
Restoration of Manjushri mural

== See also ==
- Kizilgaha Caves
- Kumtura Caves
- Simsim Caves
- Shikshin Temple
- Subashi Temple
- Silk Road transmission of Buddhism
