= Kumtura Caves =

Buddhist site in Xinjiang, China

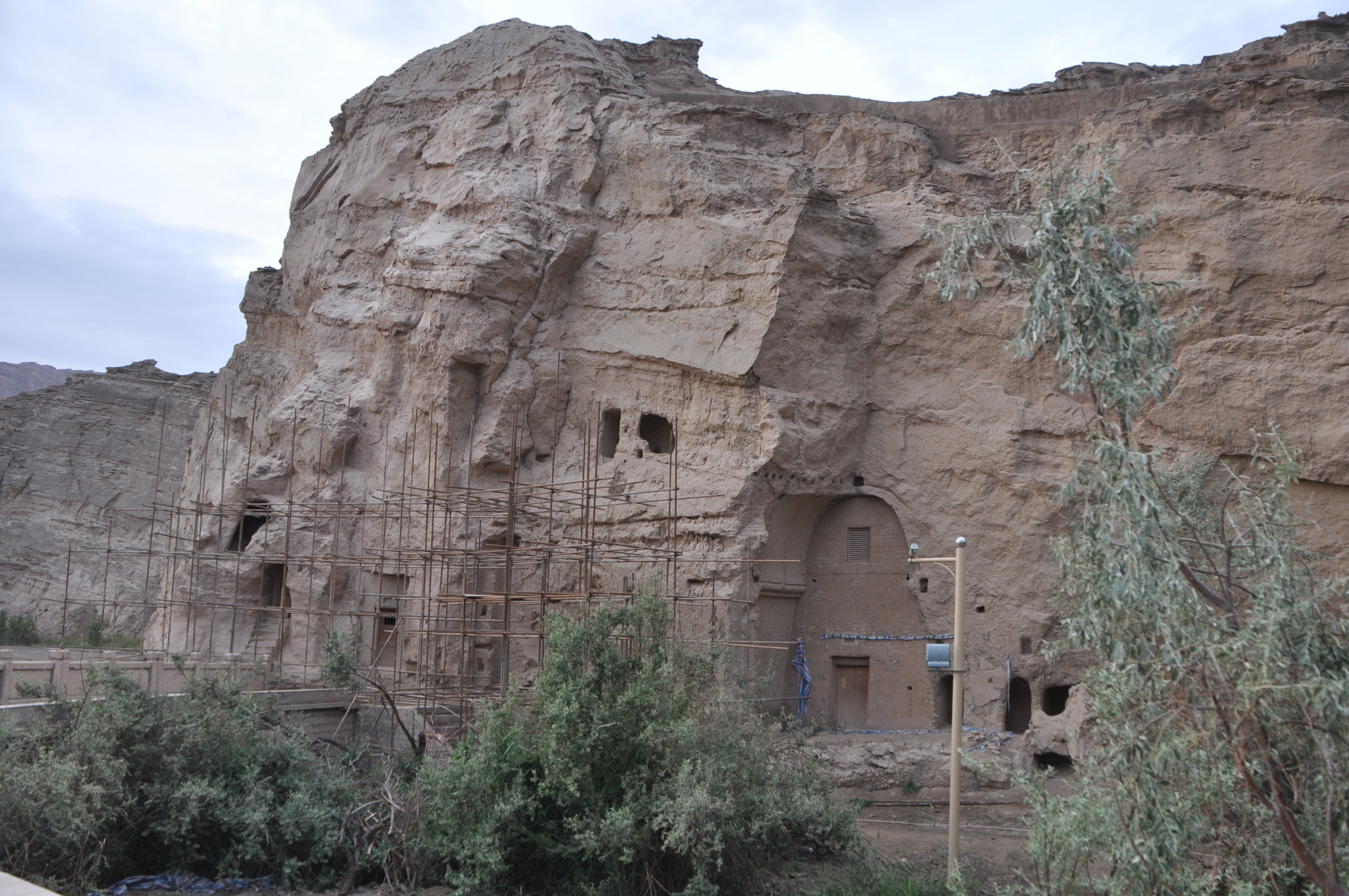
- Kumtula Grottoes

- Location within Xinjiang Location within China
- 41.7117°N 82.6784°E
- Location: Xinjiang, China

The Kumtura Thousand Buddha Caves (simplified Chinese: 库木吐喇千佛洞; traditional Chinese: 庫木吐喇千佛洞; pinyin: Kùmùtǔlǎ Qiānfódòng) (also Qumtura; Uyghur: قۇمتۇرا) is a Buddhist cave temple site in the Autonomous Region of Xinjiang, China. The site is located some 25 km west of Kucha, Kuqa County, on the ancient Silk Road. Other famous sites nearby are the Kizilgaha Caves, the Kizil Caves, Subashi Temple and the Simsim Caves.

112 cave temples survive, dating from the fifth to the eleventh centuries. Damaged by occasional habitation after abandonment of the site, Kumtura was visited by a number of the early foreign expeditions to Chinese Central Asia, including the 1902 Ōtani expedition, Oldenburg, and Le Coq. The last detached several wall paintings and took them back to Berlin (now at the Museum für Asiatische Kunst).

Construction of the Dongfang Hong Hydroelectric Plant in the 1970s caused the water level of the Muzat River to rise and has increased the rate of decay of the wall paintings. Long-term preservation measures under the auspices of UNESCO began in 1999 with extensive documentation and survey work and consolidation of the conglomerate rock from which the caves are excavated. The site was among the first to be designated for protection in 1961 as a Major National Historical and Cultural Site. In 2008 Kumtula Grottoes was submitted for future inscription on the UNESCO World Heritage List as part of the Chinese Section of the Silk Road.

== Gallery ==
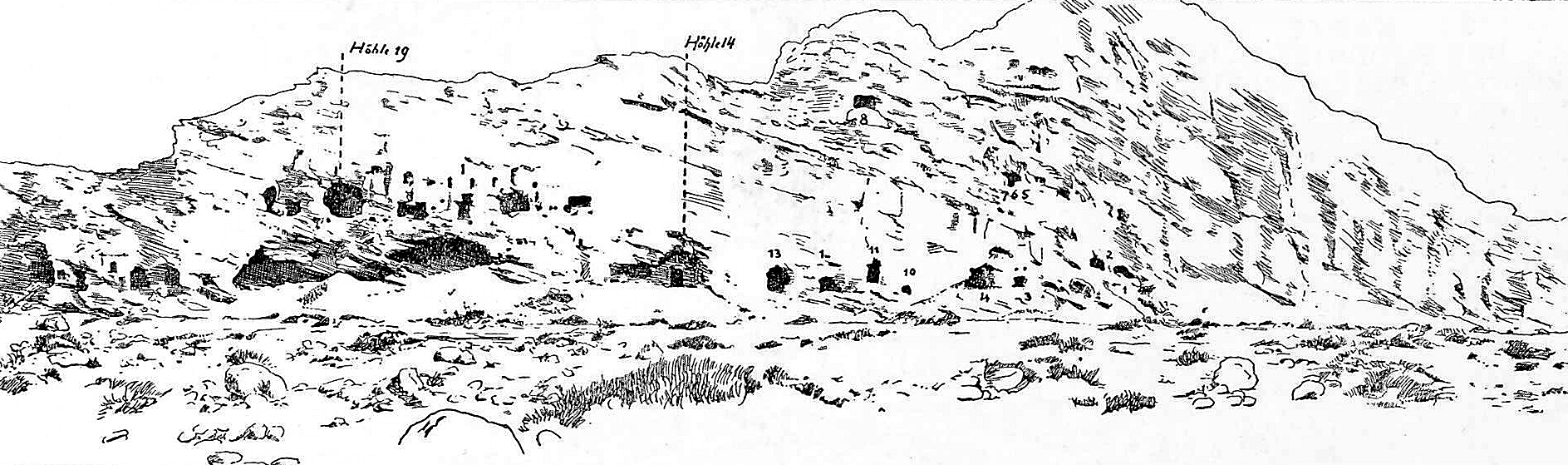
Kumtura Caves overview

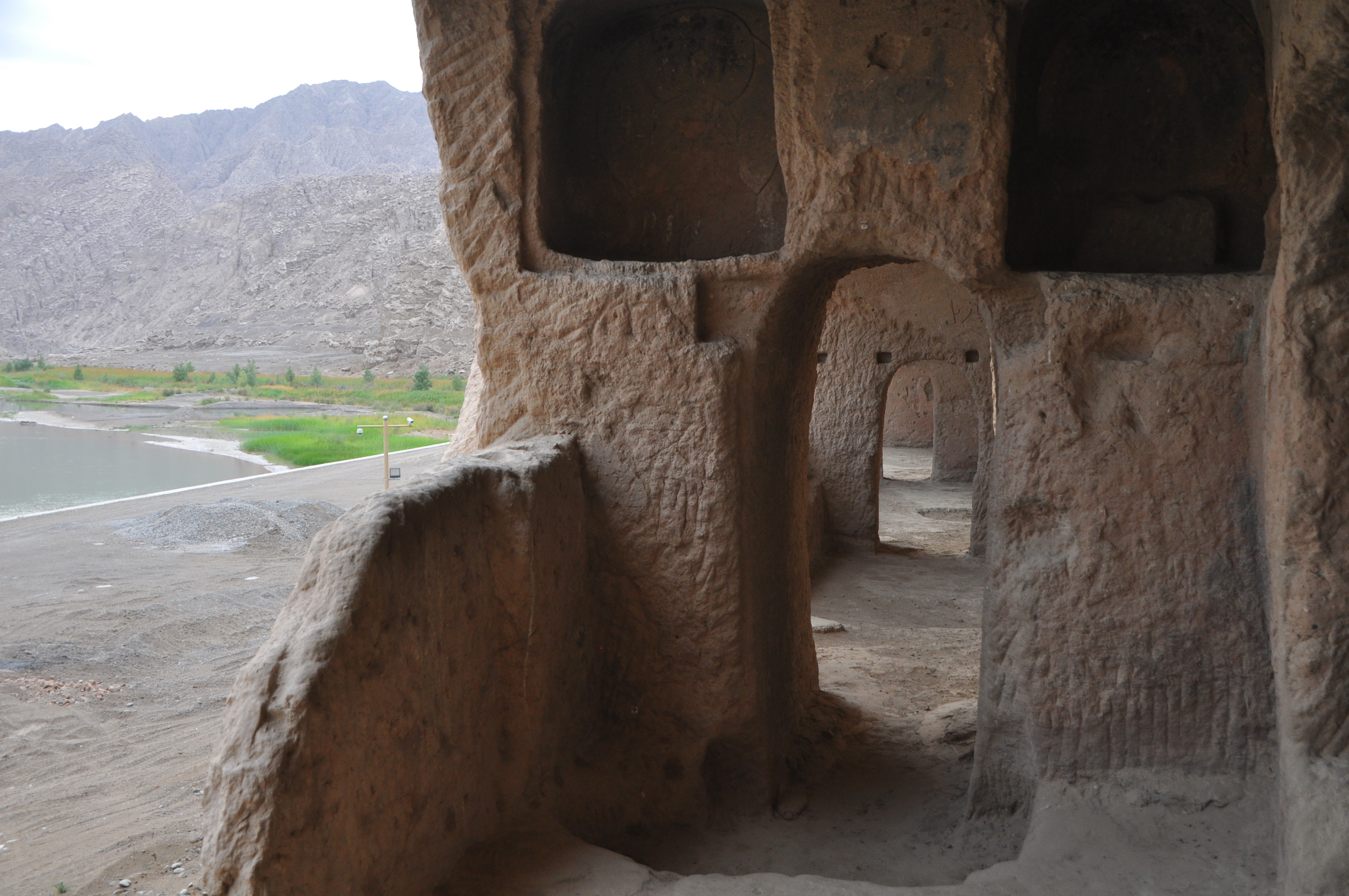
The Kumtura Grottoes are located along the Muzat River.

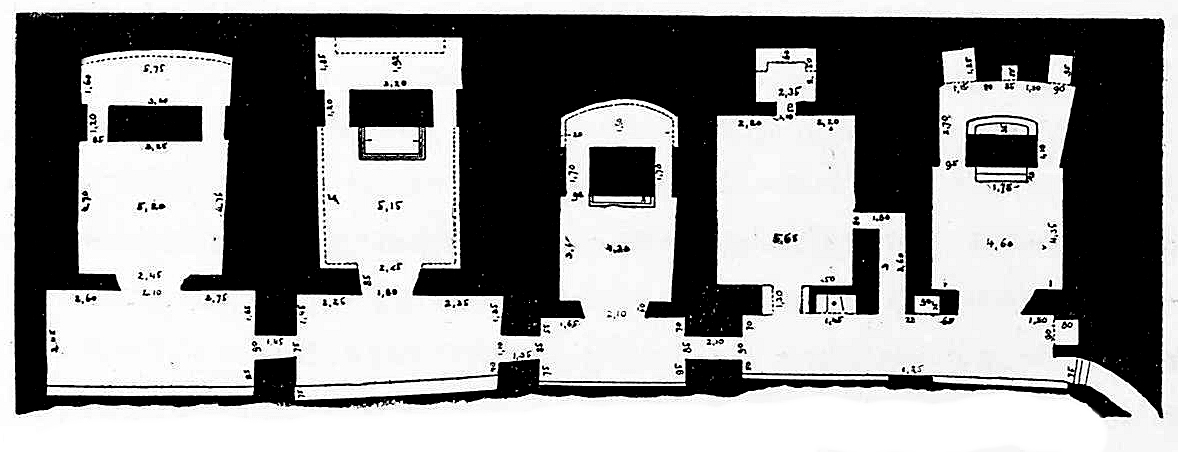
Kumtura Caves, sample plan

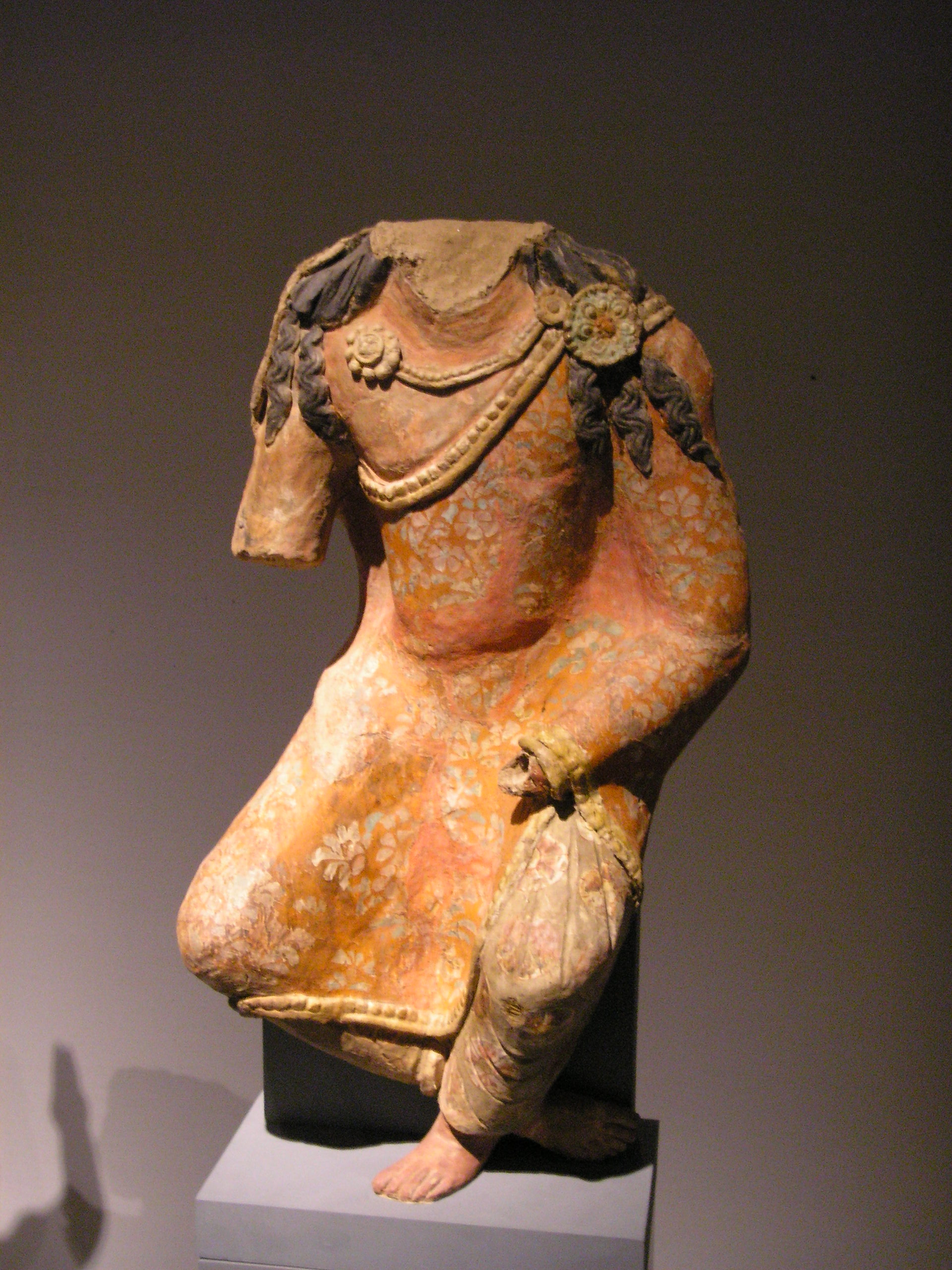
Headless statue from Kumtura at the Museum für Asiatische Kunst, Berlin

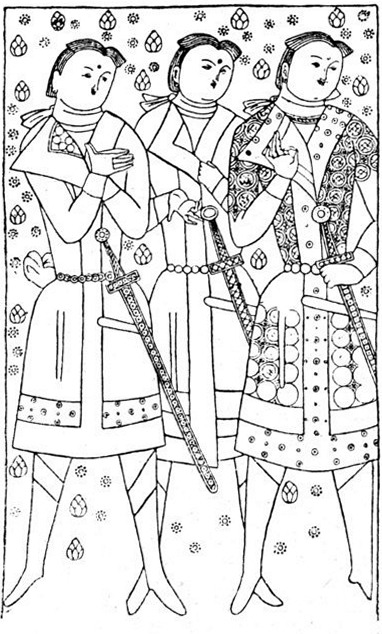
Donors in Hephthalite style, Kumtura Caves. Similar donors can be seen in the Kizil Caves. Circa 500 CE.

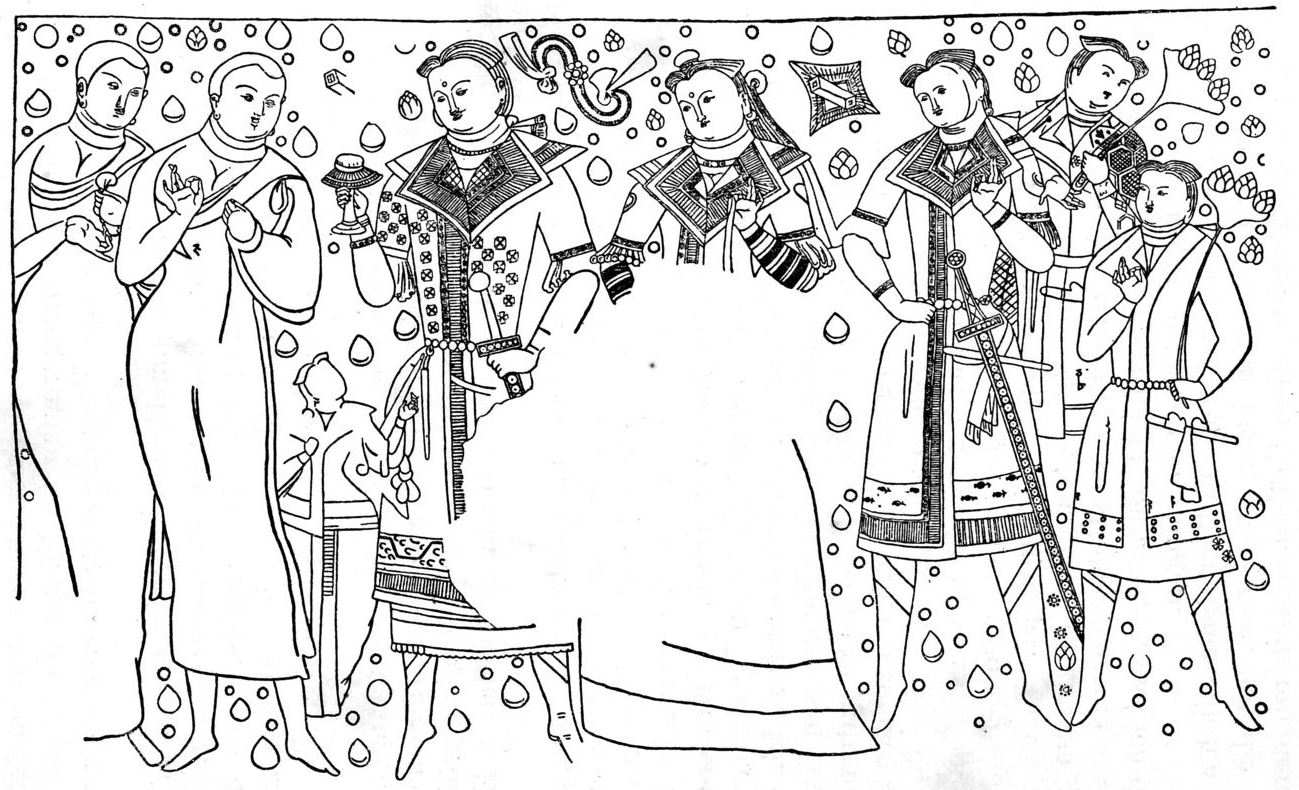
Group of donors in Tocharian clothing, Kumtura Caves.

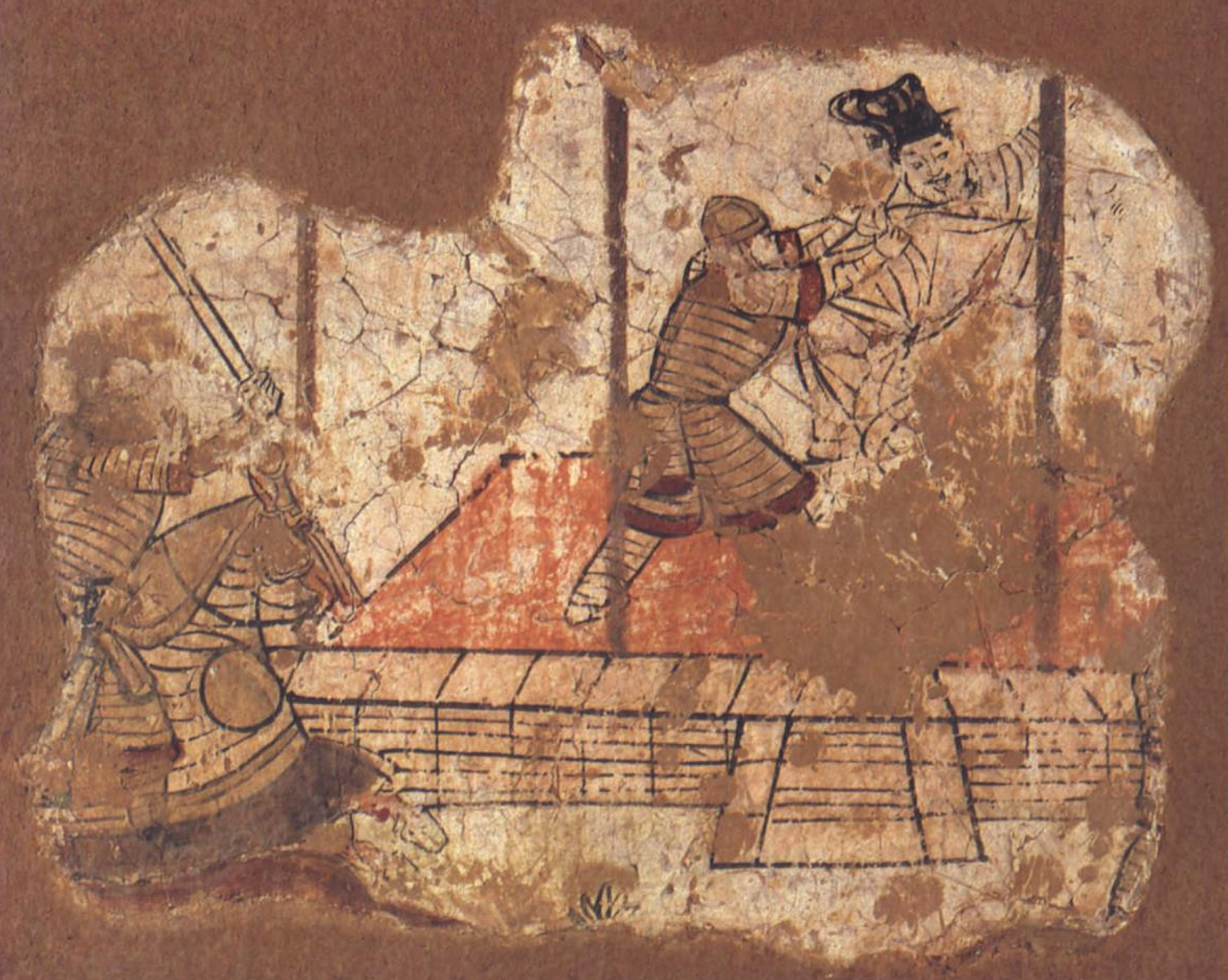
Dignitary seized by soldiers. Kumtura painting, 8th-9th century CE

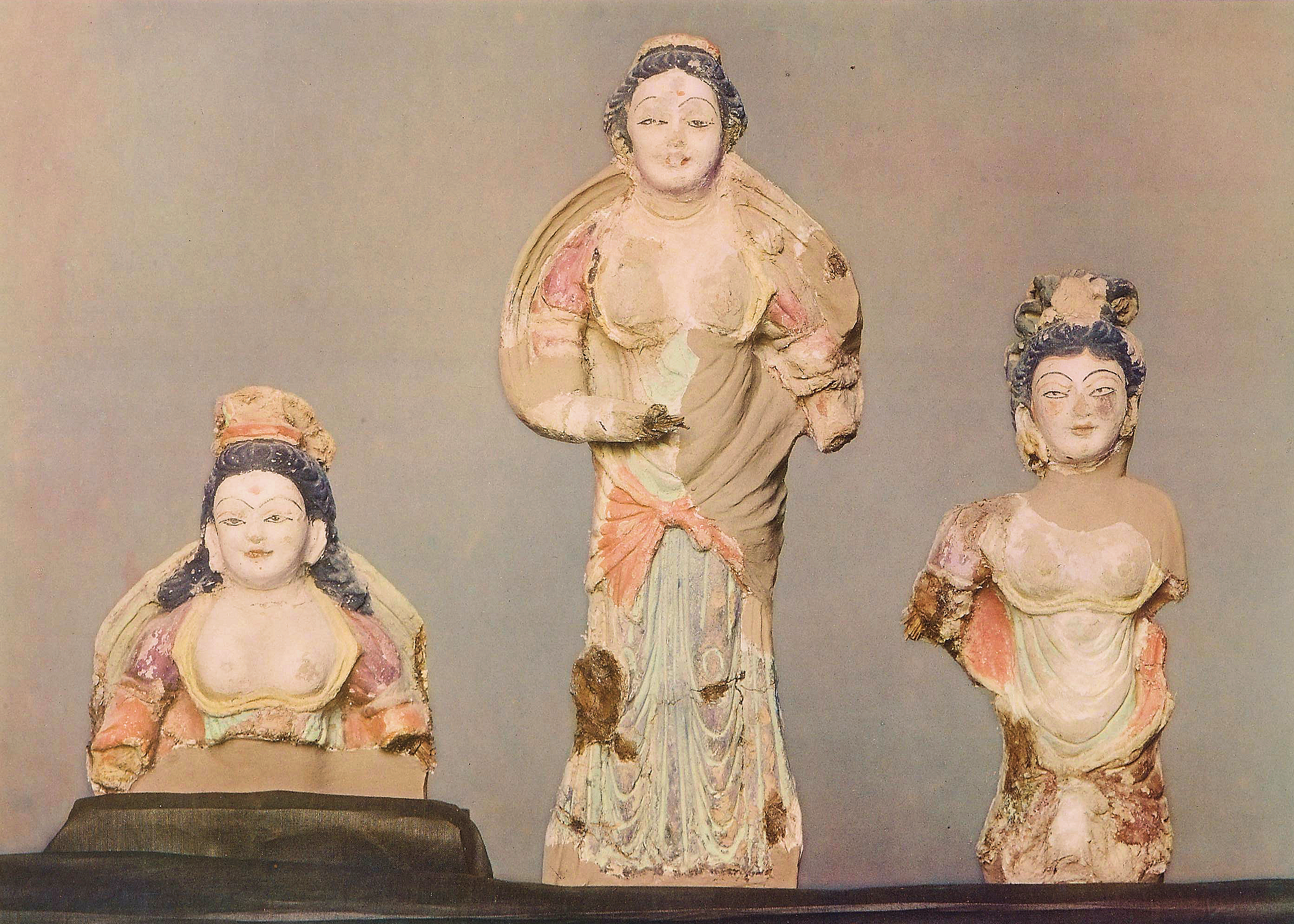
Statuettes of Devatas, Kumtura

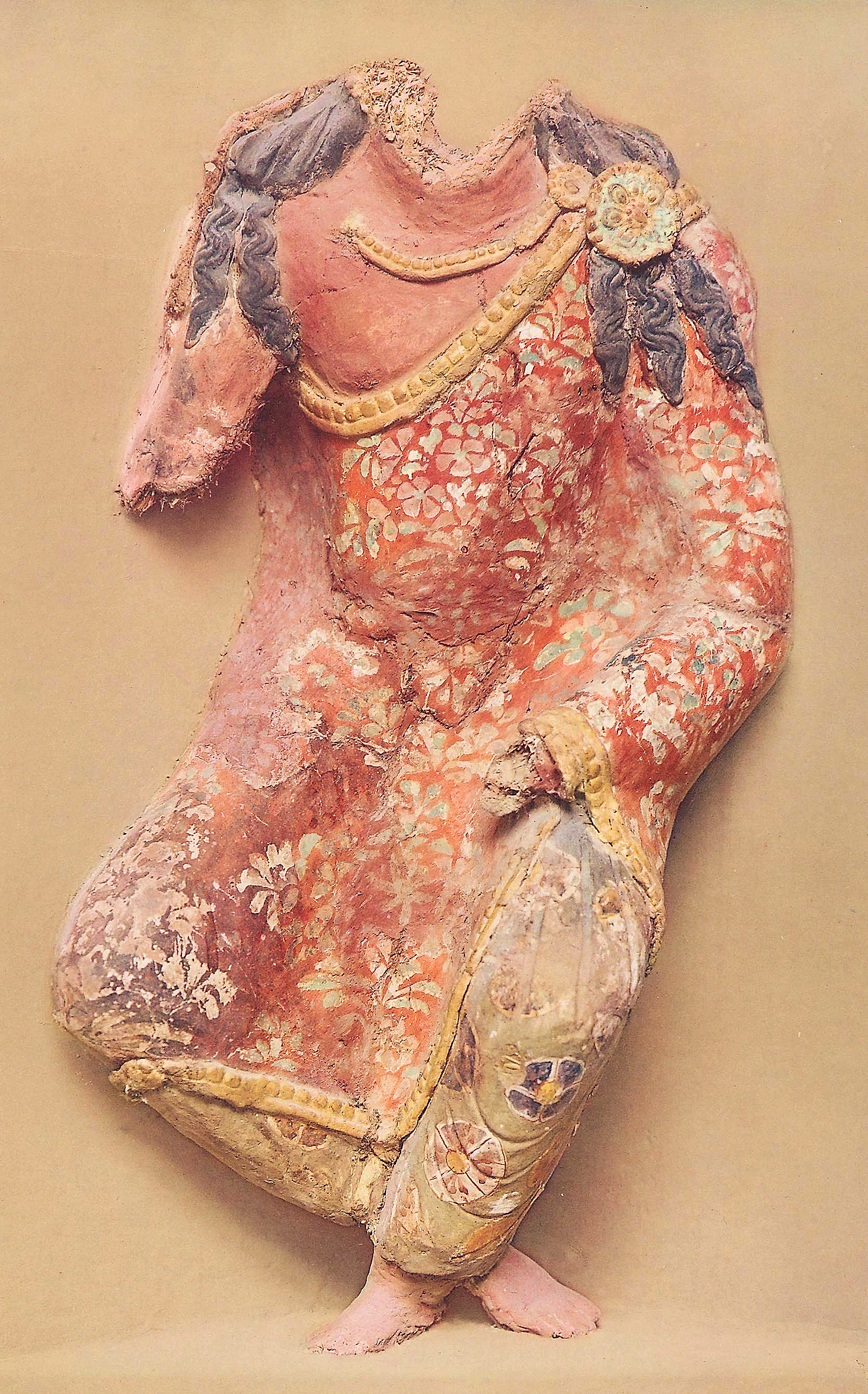
Man in royal attire, Kumtura Caves

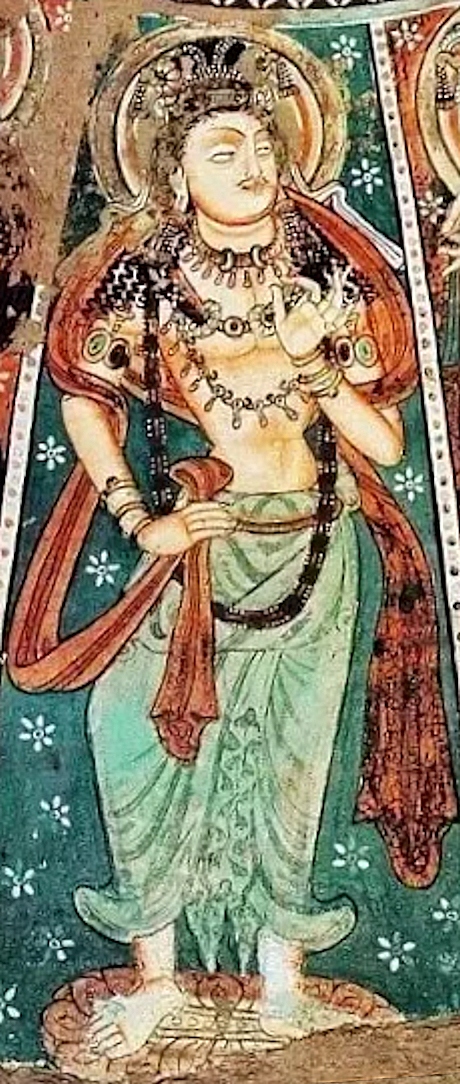
Kumtura deity (dome)

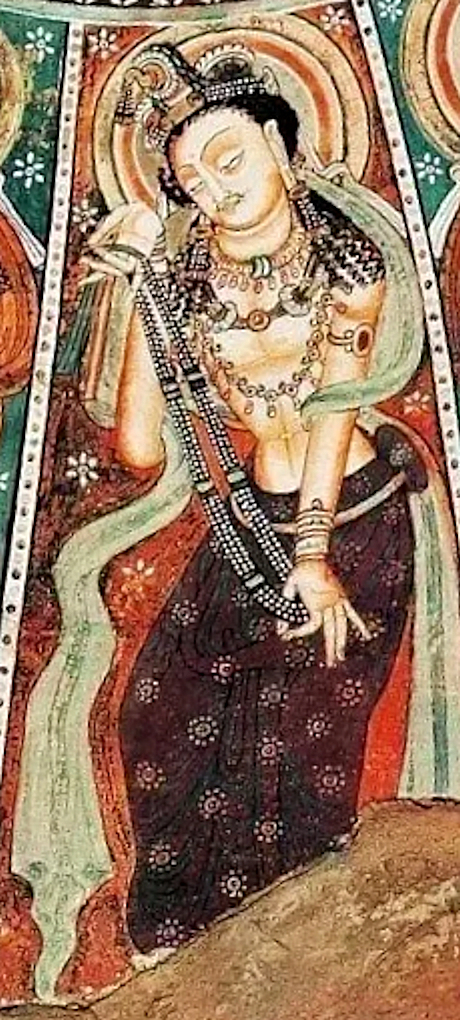
Kumtura deity (dome)

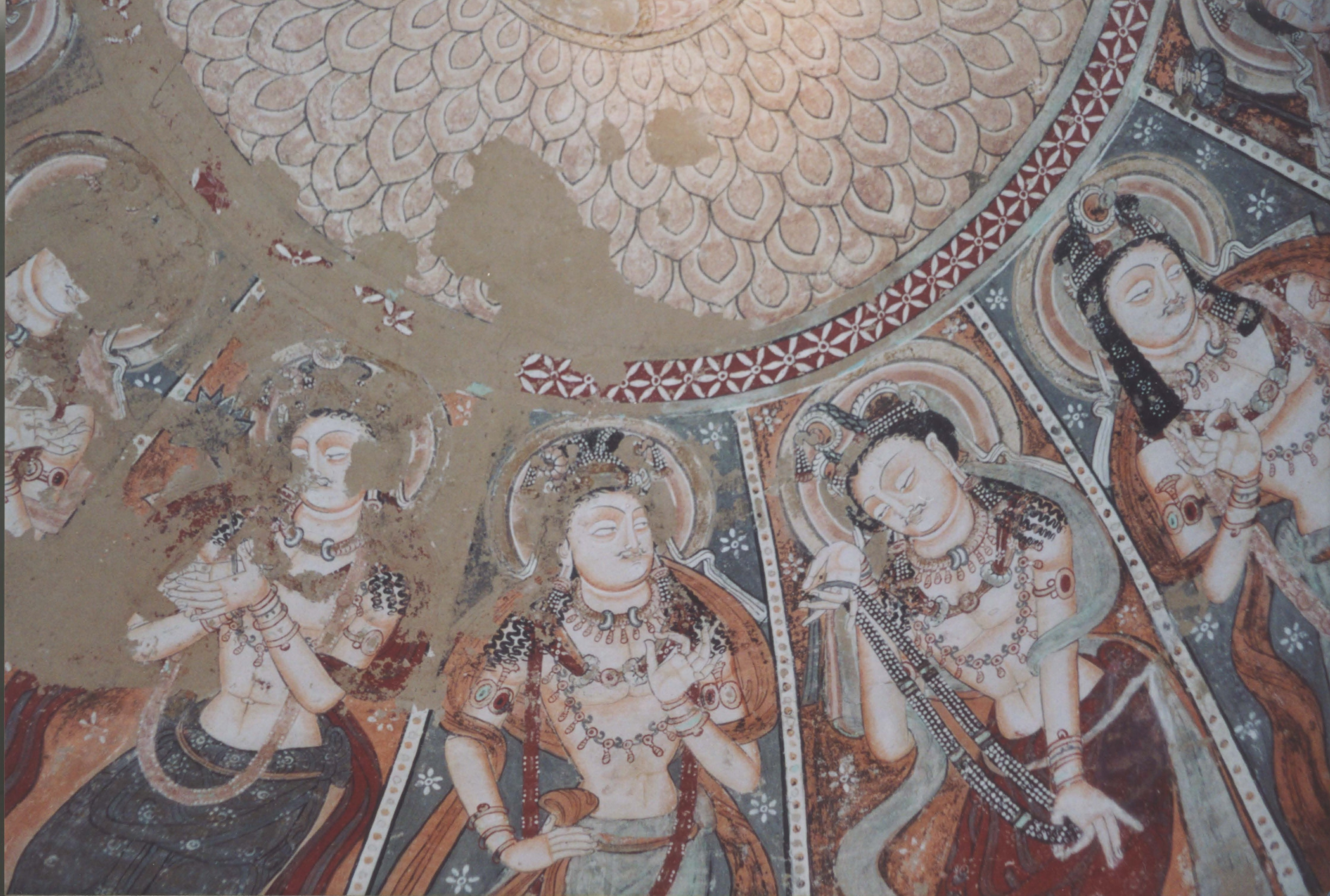
Fresco on the dome

== See also ==
- Principles for the Conservation of Heritage Sites in China
- National Heritage Sites in Xinjiang
- Ah-ai Grotto
- Kizil Caves
- Bezeklik Thousand Buddha Caves
- Mogao Caves
- International Dunhuang Project
