= Subashi Temple =

Archaeological site in Xinjiang, China

- 苏巴什佛寺遗址 (Chinese)
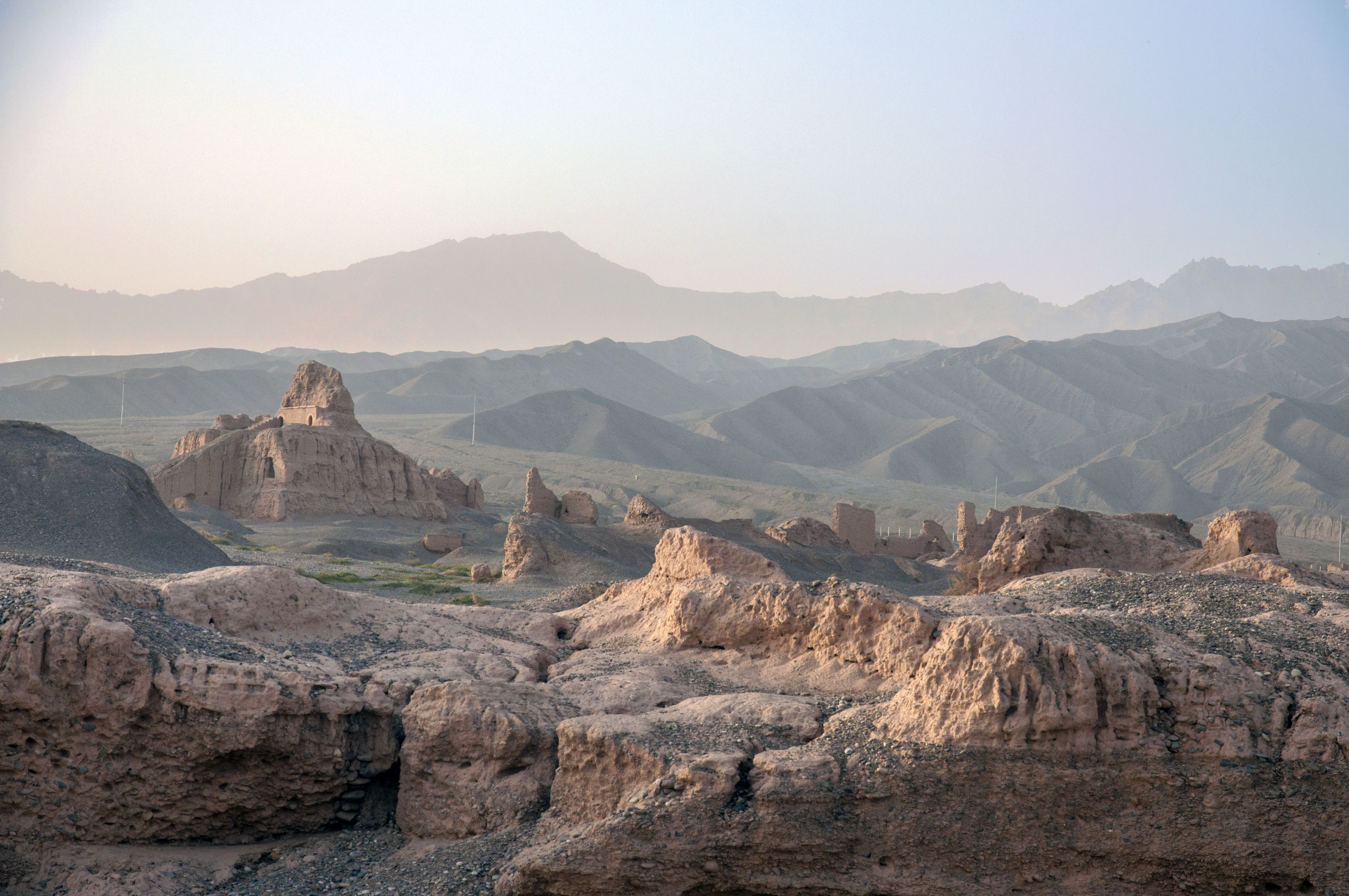
- Ruins of Subashi

- Location within Xinjiang
- 41°51′21″N 83°02′49″E
- Location: Kuqa, Xinjiang, China

UNESCO World Heritage Site
- Part of: Silk Roads: the Routes Network of Chang'an-Tianshan Corridor
- Criteria: Cultural: (ii), (iii), (vi)
- Reference: 1442
- Inscription: 2014 (38th Session)
- Area: 854.11 ha (2,110.6 acres)

Subashi Temple (Chinese: 苏巴什佛寺遗址; pinyin: Sūbāshén fósì yízhǐ; lit. 'Subashi temple ruins') is a ruined Buddhist temple near Kucha in the Taklamakan Desert, on the ancient Silk Road, in Xinjiang, Western China. The city was partly excavated by the Japanese archaeologist Count Otani.

Other famous sites nearby are the Ah-ai Grotto, Kizilgaha Caves, the Kumtura Caves, the Kizil Caves and the Simsim Caves. These sites and others along the Silk Road were inscribed in 2014 on the UNESCO World Heritage List as the Silk Roads: the Routes Network of Chang'an-Tianshan Corridor World Heritage Site.

A sarira, a Buddhist relic box of the 6th–7th century, discovered in Subashi shows Central Asian men in long tunics, reminiscent of friezes produced by the Tocharians.

The "Witch of Subashi" is another famous archaeological artifact, the mummy of a woman with a huge pointed hat, thought to be a representative of early Caucasian populations who lived in the region around the beginning of our era.

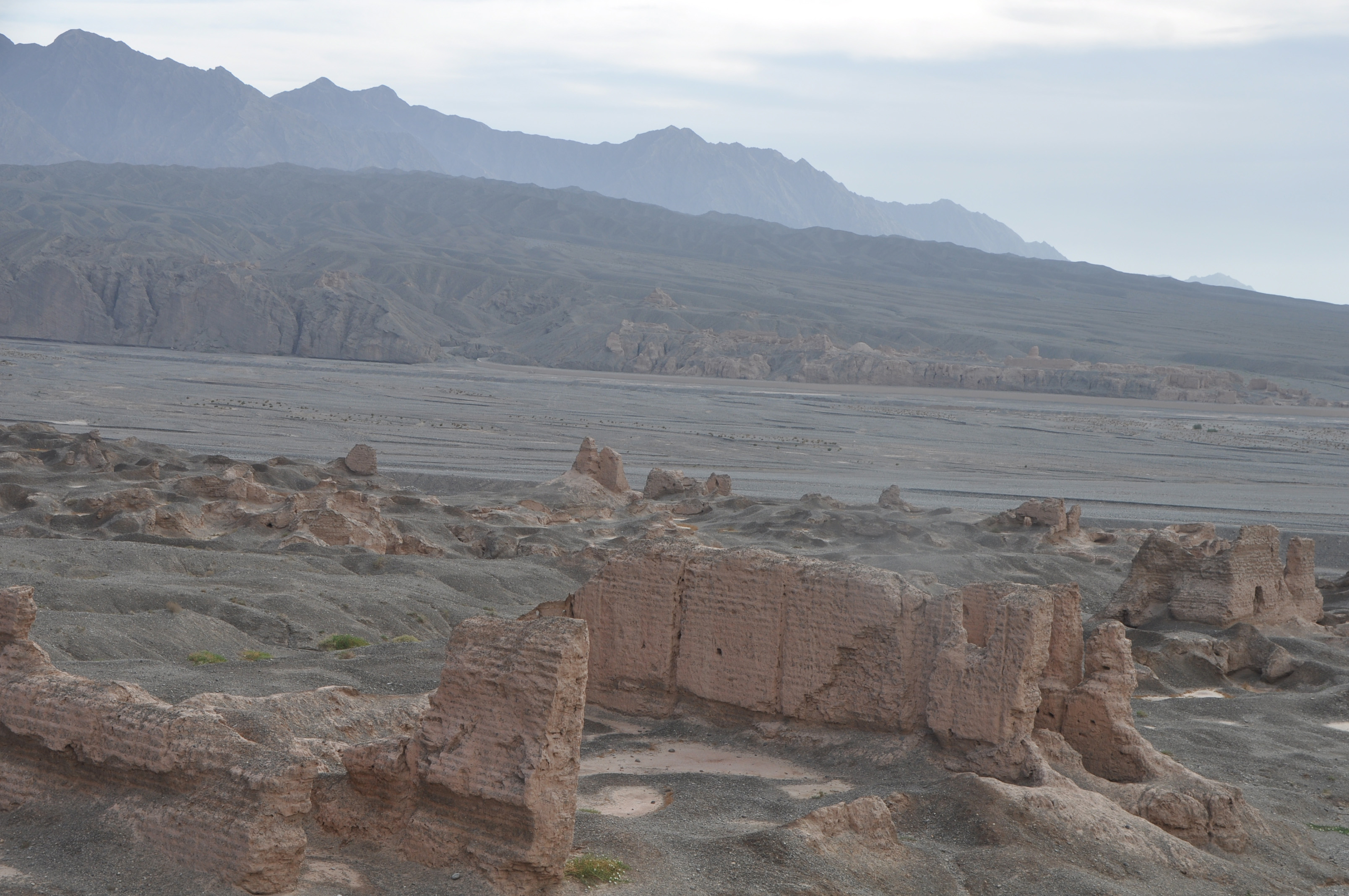
Subashi Buddhist Temple Ruins - East Area

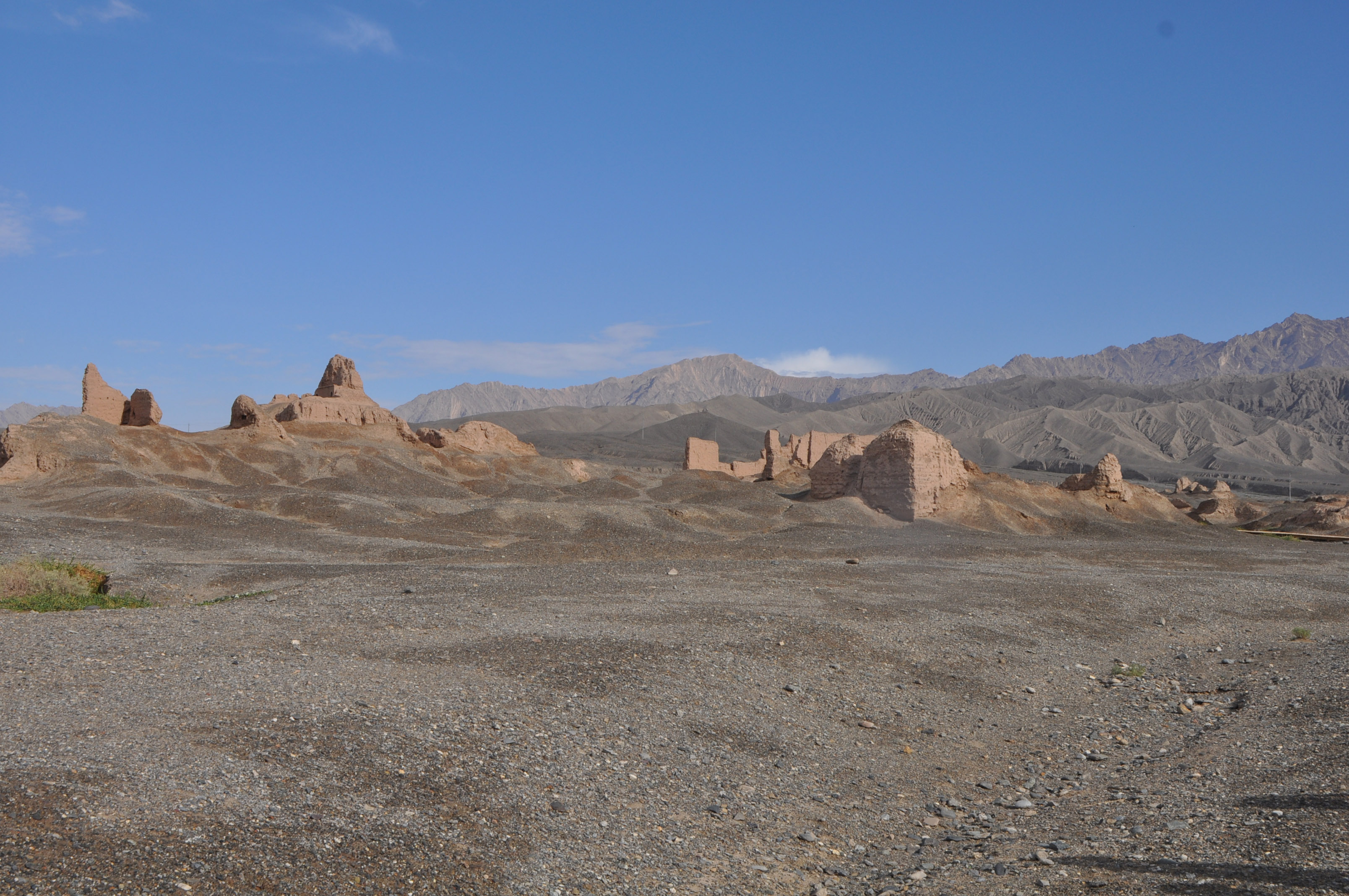
Subashi Buddhist Temple Ruins - West Area

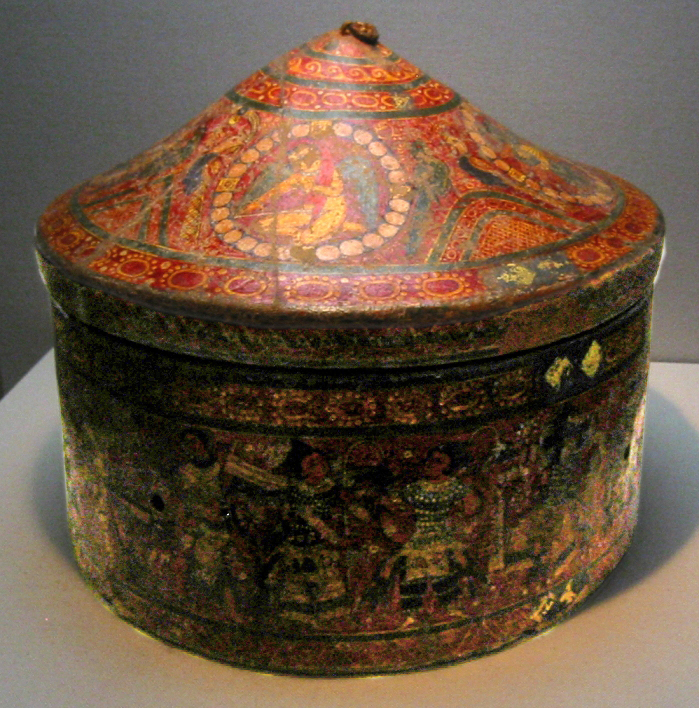
Sarira casket from Subashi. Wood covered with hemp and painted. 6th-7th century. Otani Collection. Tokyo National Museum.

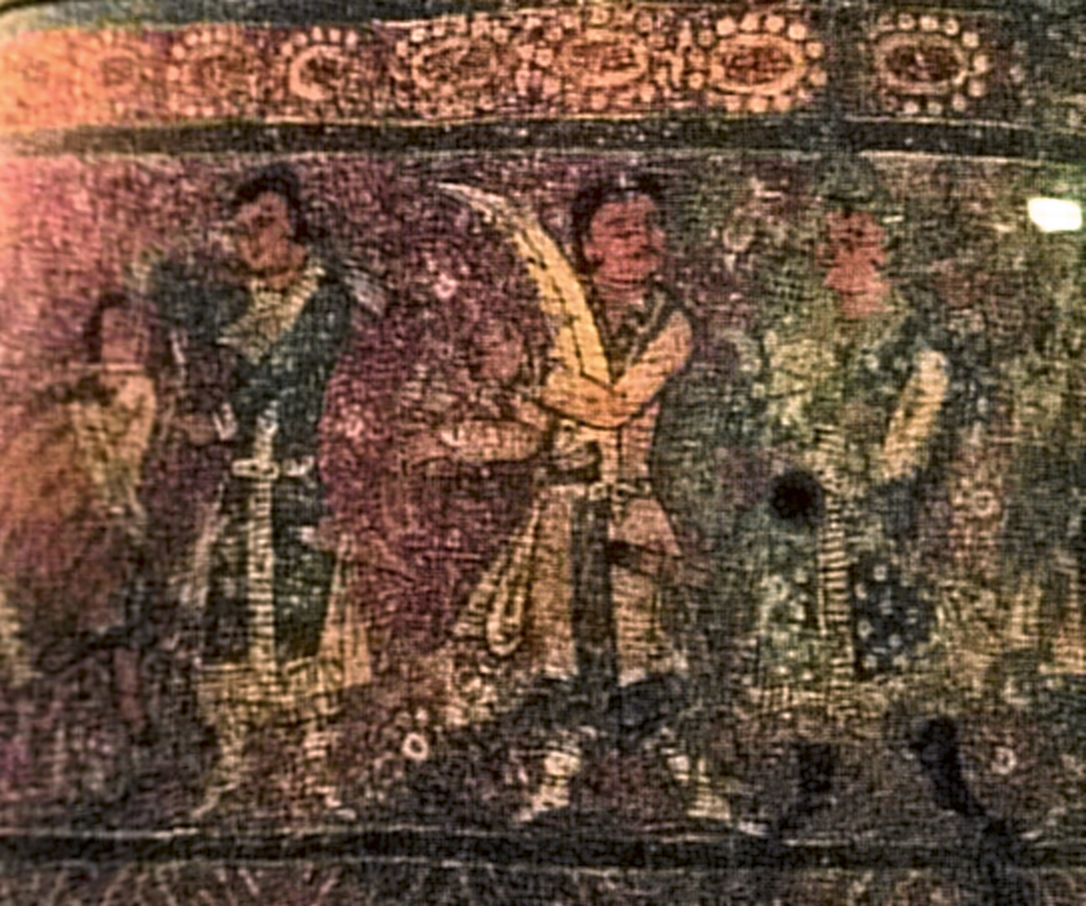
Central Asian men, detail of Sarira box.

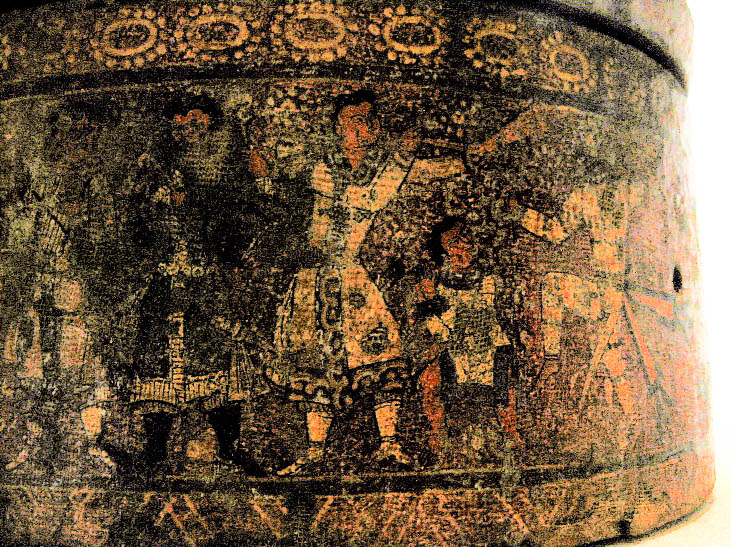
Central Asian men, detail of Sarira box.

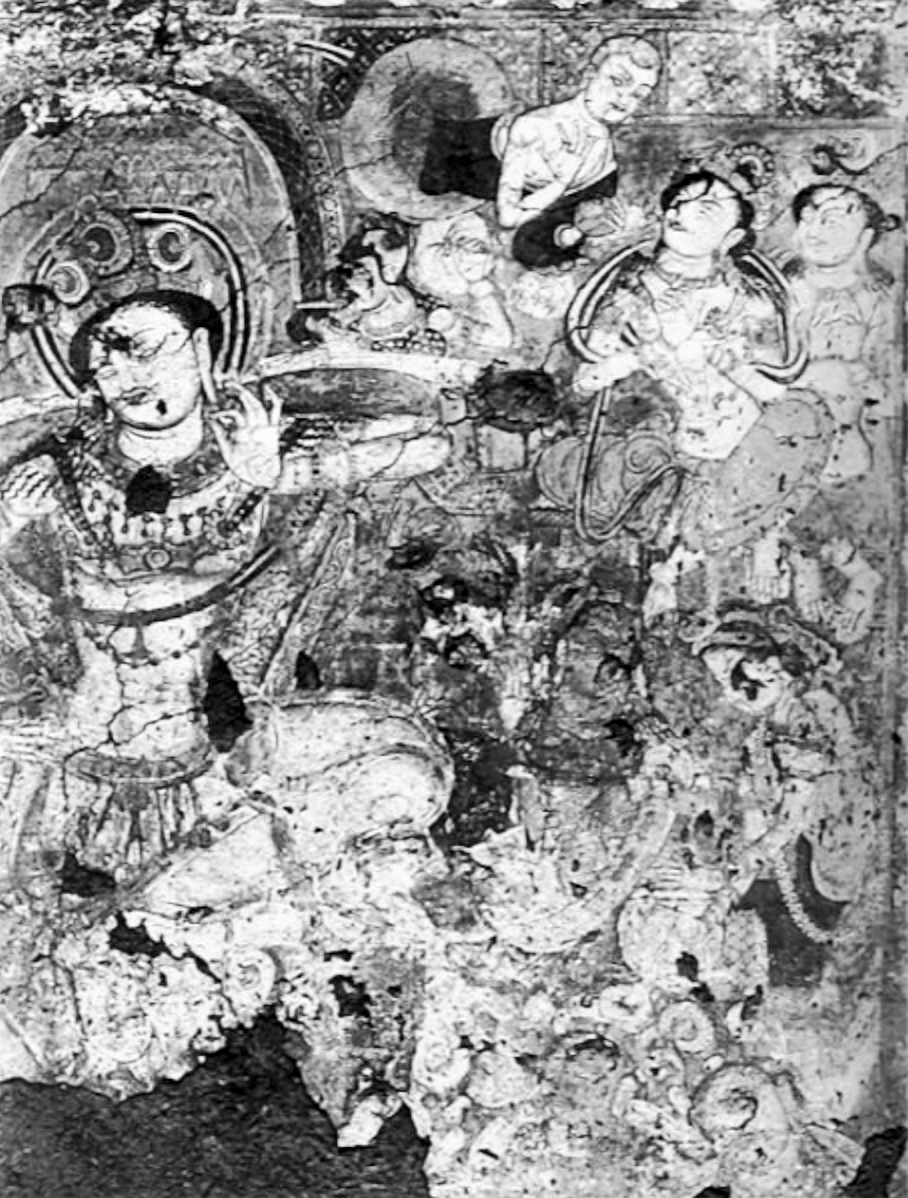
Subashi painting, 6th-7th century CE.

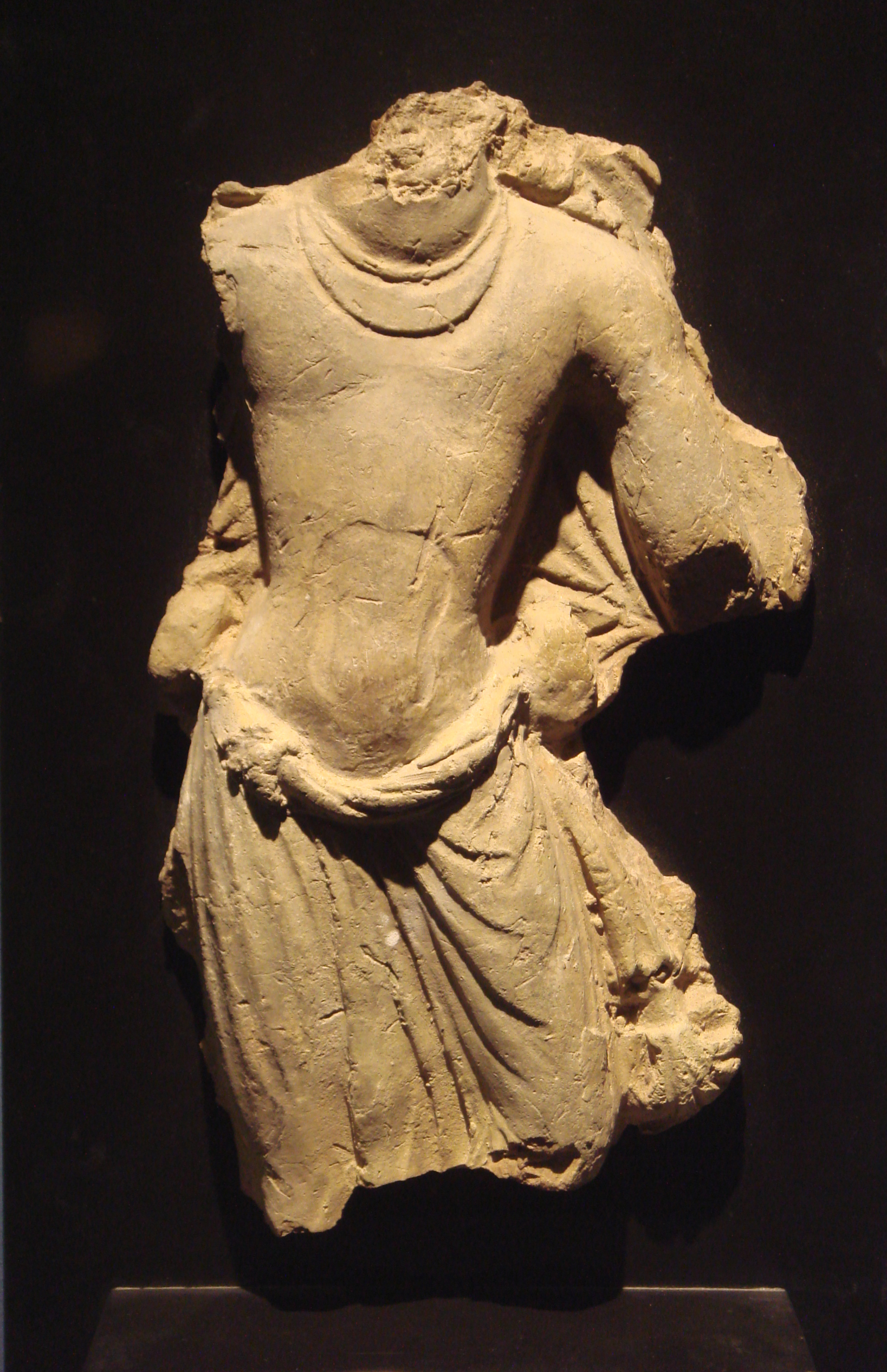
Male torso, Subashi (western area), Xinjiang, China, end of 6th-early 7th century CE, Guimet Museum (MG 23751)
