= Kizilgaha Caves =

Buddhist site in Xinjiang, China

- Location within Xinjiang
- 41.791667°N 82.898611°E
- Location: Xinjiang, China

The Kizilgaha Caves (simplified Chinese: 克孜尔尕哈石窟; traditional Chinese: 克孜爾尕哈石窟; pinyin: Kèzīěrgǎhā shíkū) consist in a Buddhist Temple inside a complex of caves in the area of Kucha, Xinjiang, China. The paintings in the cave go back to the 5th century CE. Other famous sites nearby are the Ah-ai Grotto, Kizil Caves, Kumtura, Subashi Temple and the Simsim Caves.

== Gallery ==
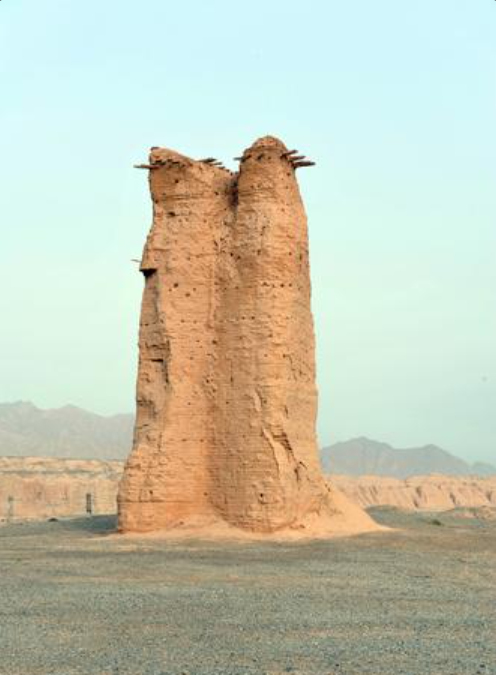
Kizilgaha beacon tower

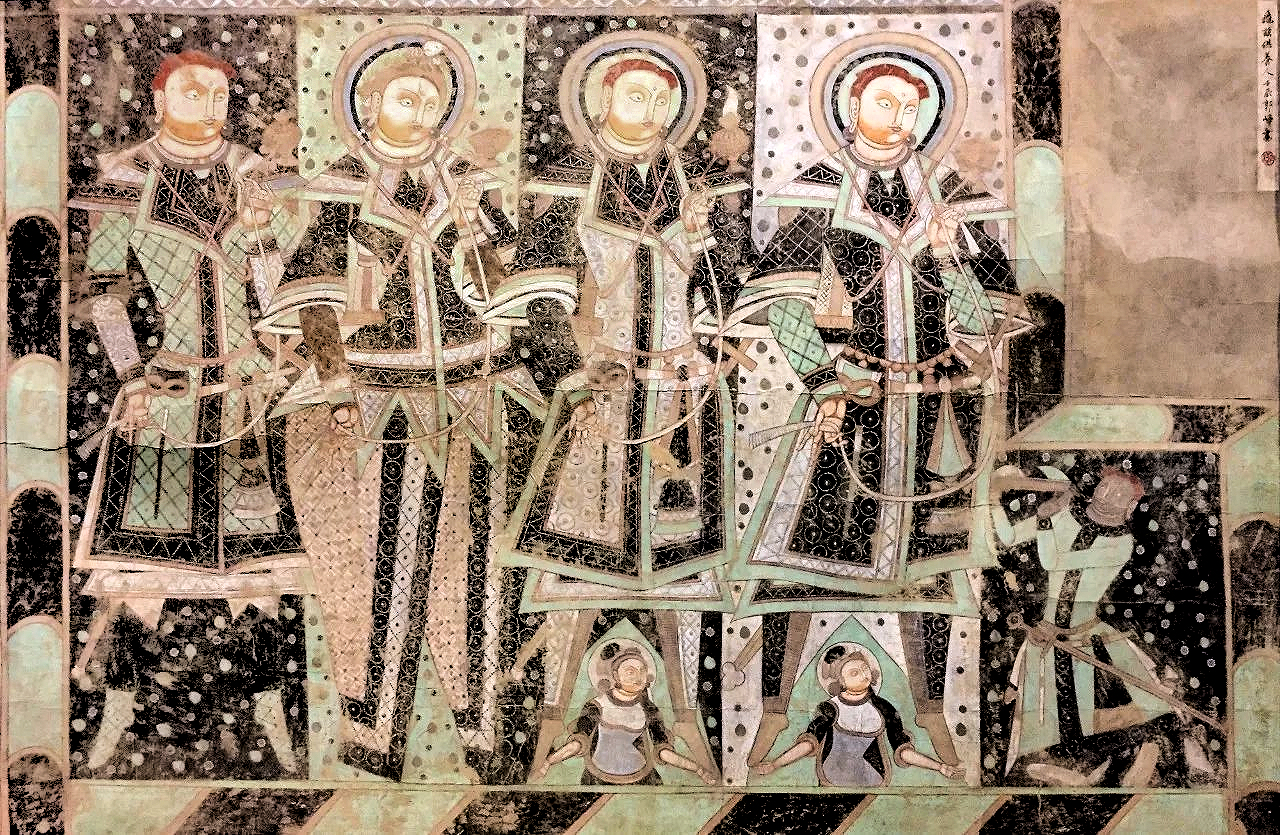
Donors in Tocharian clothing, Kizilgaha cave 14, Kucha

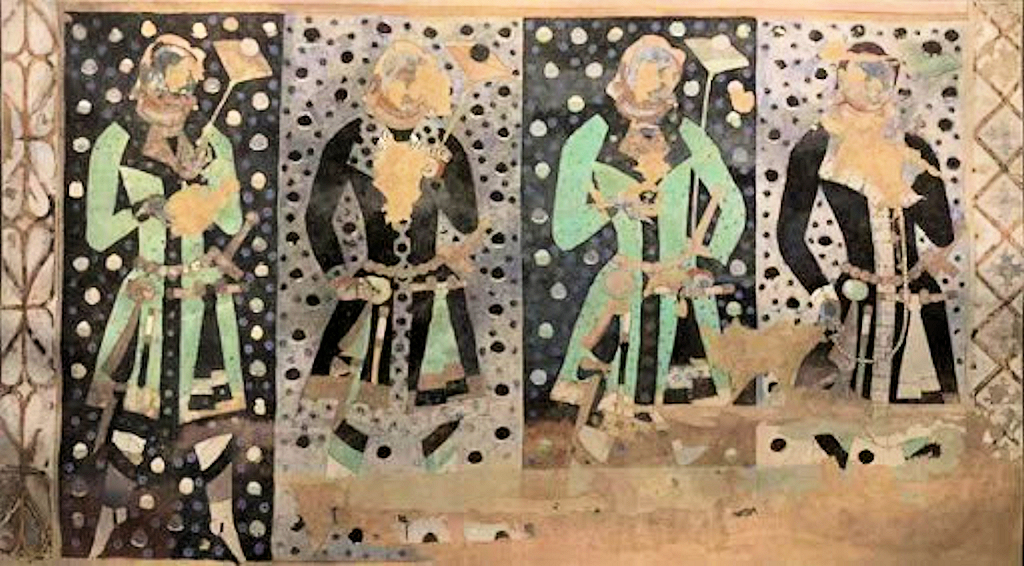
Donors in Tocharian clothing, Kizilgaha, cave 30.
