= Ministry of Culture, Information and Youth Policy (Kyrgyzstan) =

Government ministry of Kyrgyzstan

Ministry of Culture, Information, Sports and Youth Policy
- Маданият, маалымат, спорт жана жаштар саясаты министрлиги Министерство культуры, информации, спорта и молодежной политики

Government Ministry overview
- Jurisdiction: Government of Kyrgyzstan
- Headquarters: Bishkek, Kyrgyz Republic
- Minister responsible: Kairat Imanaliev
- Website: https://www.minculture.gov.kg

The Ministry of Culture, Information, Sports and Youth Policy (Kyrgyz: Маданият, маалымат, спорт жана жаштар саясаты министрлиги, romanized: Madaniyat, maalymat, sport jana jashtar sayasaty ministrligi), previously known as the Ministry of Culture, Information and Tourism of the Kyrgyz Republic, is the ministry in charge of preservation and promotion of Kyrgyzstani culture in the republic and abroad.

The ministry has its roots in the Soviet Union's Ministry of Culture, although the current ministry did not succeed directly from the Soviet ministry. Moreover there were no ministries or state committees for tourism in the Soviet Union, because tourists to and from non-communist countries were highly restricted and few in numbers.

The ministry oversees various arts, cultural and historic sites in the republic, they include but are not limited to cinemas, circus, libraries, monuments, museums, musical institutions, parks, the National Cultural Center, the Philharmonic Hall and theaters. The ministry also oversees and regulates the republic's artists, teachers and promoters of culture of Kyrgyzstan.

== Structure ==
The ministry is subdivided into three departments:

=== Department of Cinematography ===
This department is in charge of the regulation of the film industry in the Kyrgyz Republic as well as the promotion of the republic through films, some of which were showcased internationally. The department has also partnered the Prince Claus Fund for Culture and Development in establishing the Cinema Development Fund so as to enable local filmmakers to have better resources to produce films.

=== Department of Information and Mass Communications ===
This department is in charge of the regulation of information made via mass media in the republic. An example of the department's scope of work include promoting and initiating the moving of local newspapers into electronic format.

=== Department of Tourism ===
This department is responsible for organising events related to tourism in Kyrgyzstan. These include the World Nomad Games which was held thrice in the republic, Apricot Festival and Karagat Festival. The department also actively promotes the republic's UNESCO world heritage sites in addition to establishing a VISA free regime for travellers from over 60 countries, so as to further boost the tourism sector and attract investment. The department has also joined various organisations like the World Tourism Organization so as learn about sustainability of tourists sites in the republic.
