= List of Intangible Cultural Heritage elements in Kyrgyzstan =

Location of Kyrgyzstan

The United Nations Educational, Scientific and Cultural Organization (UNESCO) defines intangible cultural heritage elements as non-physical traditions and practices performed by a people. As part of a country's cultural heritage, they include celebrations, festivals, performances, oral traditions, music, and the making of handicrafts. The term intangible cultural heritage is formally established by the Convention for the Safeguarding of the Intangible Cultural Heritage, which was drafted in 2003 and took effect in 2006. The inscription of new heritage elements on UNESCO's Intangible Cultural Heritage Lists for protection and safeguarding is determined by the Intergovernmental Committee for the Safeguarding of Intangible Cultural Heritage, an organization established by the Convention. Kyrgyzstan ratified the Convention on 6 November 2006. It has served on the Intangible Cultural Heritage Committee from 2012 to 2016.

National lists are required by the Convention for the further nomination of elements to the UNESCO lists.

== Intangible Cultural Heritage of Humanity ==
UNESCO's Intangible Cultural Heritage of Humanity consists of three lists: the Representative List of the Intangible Cultural Heritage of Humanity, the List of Intangible Cultural Heritage in Need of Urgent Safeguarding, and the Register of Good Safeguarding Practices. Kyrgyzstan has elements inscribed on all the lists.

† Transnational element

=== Representative List ===
This list aims to represent the intangible cultural heritage of Kyrgyzstan worldwide and bring awareness to its significance.

Intangible Cultural Heritage elements recognized by UNESCO
Name	Media	Year	No.	Description
Art of Akyns, Kyrgyz epic tellers		2008	00065	
Kyrgyz epic trilogy: Manas, Semetey, Seytek	The alleged burial site of Manas, a hero in the epic	2013	00876	
Aitysh/Aitys, art of improvisation † (Note: Shared with Kazakhstan)	A silver coin displaying an Aitysh competition.	2015	00997	
Flatbread making and sharing culture: Lavash, Katyrma, Jupka, Yufka † (Note: Shared with Azerbaijan, Iran, Kazakhstan, and Turkey.)	Pieces of lavash bread compiled in a wooden serving basket.	2016	01181	
Kok boru, traditional horse game	Game of kok boru, or buzkashi, in Mazar-i-Sharif, Afghanistan	2017	01294	
Ak-kalpak craftsmanship, traditional knowledge and skills in making and wearing Kyrgyz men’s headwear	A man wearing the ak-kalpak a white felt hat	2019	01496	
Traditional intelligence and strategy game: Togyzqumalaq, Toguz Korgool, Mangala/Göçürme † (Note: Shared with Kazakhstan and Turkey.)	A small wooden board used for the toguz korgool game.	2020	01597	
Falconry, a living human heritage † (Note: Shared with Austria, Belgium, Croatia, Czechia, France, Germany, Hungary, Ireland, Italy, South Korea, Kazakhstan, Mongolia, Morocco, Netherlands, Pakistan, Poland, Portugal, Qatar, United Arab Emirates, Saudi Arabia, Slovakia, Spain, and Syria.)	An illustration of a Eurasian goshawk	2021	01708	
Telling tradition of Nasreddin Hodja/ Molla Nesreddin/ Molla Ependi/ Apendi/ Afendi Kozhanasyr Anecdotes † (Note: Shared with Azerbaijan, Kazakhstan, Tajikistan, Turkey, Turkmenistan, and Uzbekistan.)	A 17th-century miniature of Nasruddin	2022	01705	
Elechek, Kyrgyz female headwear: traditional knowledge and rituals		2023	01985	
Midwifery: knowledge, skills and practices † (Note: Shared with Colombia, Cyprus, Germany, Luxembourg, Nigeria, Slovenia, and Togo.)		2023	01968	
Nawrouz, Novruz, Nowrouz, Nowrouz, Nawrouz, Nauryz, Nooruz, Nowruz, Navruz, Nevruz, Nowruz, Navruz † (Note: Shared with Afghanistan, Azerbaijan, India, Iran, Iraq, Kazakhstan, Mongolia, Pakistan, Tajikistan, Turkey, Turkmenistan, and Uzbekistan.)	Girl with torch on mountainside	2024	02097	
Traditional knowledge and cultural contexts of making Maksym, a traditional Kyrgyz beverage		2024	01746	
Traditional knowledge and skills in making Kyrgyz, Kazakh and Karakalpak yurts (Turkic nomadic dwellings) † (Note: Shared with Kazakhstan and Uzbekistan.)	A Karakalpak bentwood type yurt inKarakalpakstan, Uzbekistan	2025	02284	

=== Need of Urgent Safeguarding ===
This list covers elements that are endangered and thus require appropriate safeguarding.

Endangered elements recognized by UNESCO
Name	Media	Year	No.	Description
Ala-kiyiz and Shyrdak, art of Kyrgyz traditional felt carpets	A shyrdak lying on the floor of a home in Aksy District, Kyrgyzstan. It is multicolored an has a complex pattern	2012	00693	

=== Register of Good Safeguarding Practices ===
This list accredits programs and projects that safeguard intangible cultural heritage and express the principles of the Convention.

Good Safeguarding Practices recognized by UNESCO
Name	Media	Year	No.	Description
Nomad games, rediscovering heritage, celebrating diversity		2021	01738	

== See also ==
- List of World Heritage Sites in Kyrgyzstan
- Culture of Kyrgyzstan
- Tourism in Kyrgyzstan
