= Imeon =

Imeon may refer to:

- Mount Imeon, Asia (historical place name)
- Imeon Range, Antarctica

== See also ==
- Imeong, a village in the free state of Palau
