= Josef Jáchym Redelmayer =

Czech painter (1727–1788)

Josef Jáchym Redelmayer (20 April 1727 - 13 February 1788) was a Czech painter, fresco painter and theatre decorator during the late Rococo period.

== Life ==
Redelmayer was born on 20 April 1727 in Prague in Bohemia. As seventeen-year-old, he began painting decorations for the Prague Theatre. For his talent and hard work he gained the favor of a local painter; he studied with him and became one of his best pupils. He was influenced by the decorative style of the Berlin painter G. Galli-Bibiena. He created paintings for the refectory in Doksany (before 1760). Redelmayer worked for the monastery until the Josephinian interference. He died on 13 February 1788 in Prague.

== Works ==
Only a few works of his are known to have survived. He is known for a painting of St. Libor in Prague with the Charles Brothers of Charity (1771), and frescoes in the church. He also worked together with Joseph Hager to decorate the hall and chapel in the castle of Bečvář (1774), and the frescoes in the Church of Our Lady in Prague Auxiliary Sanders (together with Fr. Ant. Balk).
