= Mount Imeon =

Ancient name for major Asia massif

Coordinates: 38°11′51″N 73°12′40″E

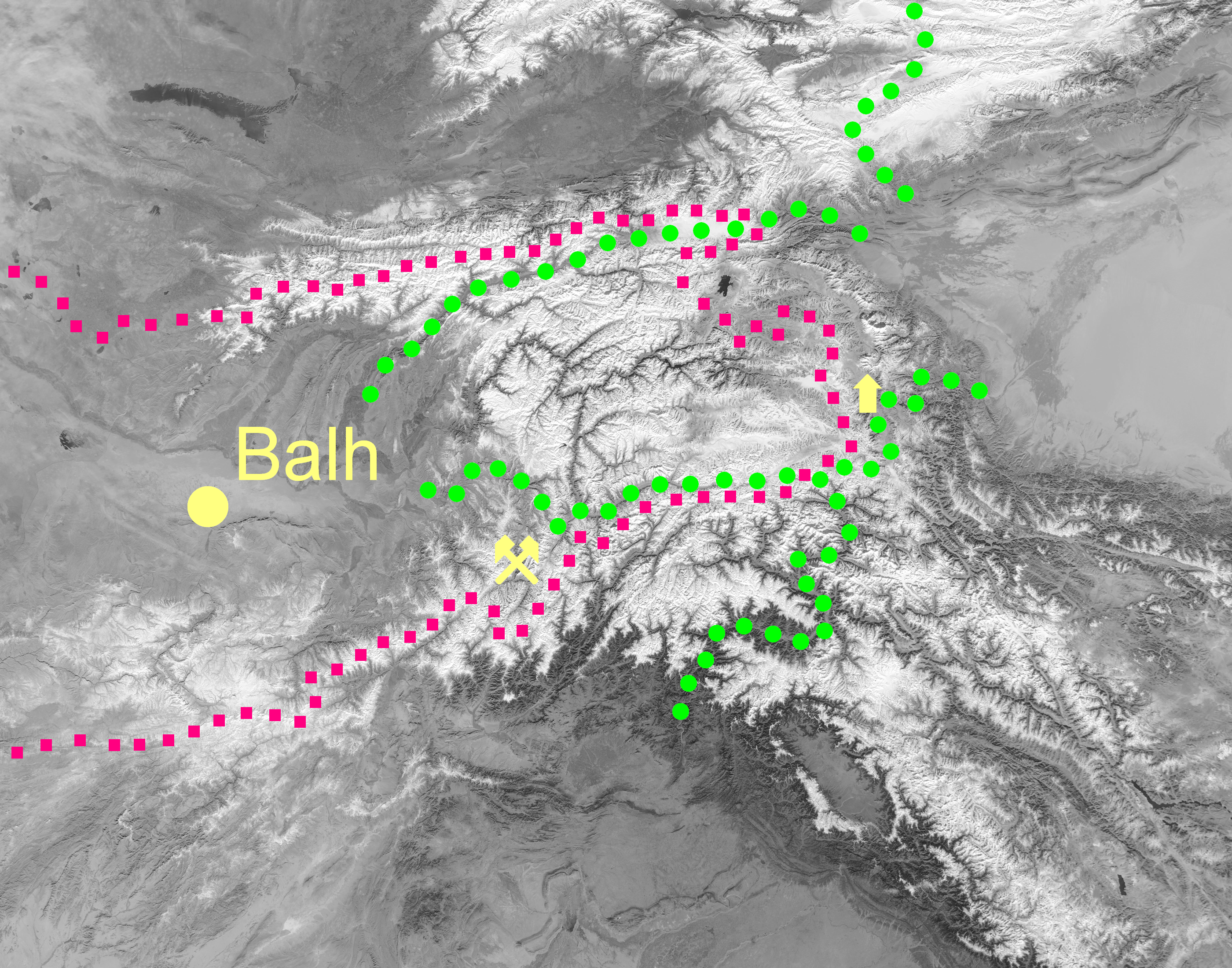
Historical map of Mount Imeon based on 7th-century Armenian geography. The pink line shows the approximate border of the Bulgar lands. Green lines delineate the "four parts": Northern, Northeastern, Southern, and Southeastern Imeon. The yellow ‘hut’ icon indicates the Stone Tower, while the crossed hammers represent Lapis lazuli mines.

Mount Imeon (/ˈɪmiən/) is an ancient name for the Central Asian huge complex of mountain ranges comprising the present Hindu Kush, Pamir and Tian Shan, extending from the Zagros Mountains in the southwest to the Altay Mountains in the northeast, and linked to the Kunlun, Karakoram and Himalayas to the southeast. The term was used by Hellenistic-era scholars as "Imaus Mount".

== Geography ==
A detailed description of the mountainous territory and its people was given in the Armenian geography index Ashharatsuyts written by Anania Shirakatsi in the 7th century AD. According to the original Ashharatsuyts mapping reconstructed by Acad. Suren T. Eremian, the mountain system was divided into four branches (delimited by green dotted lines on the map) corresponding respectively to four present ranges:

- Southern Imeon (‘Emavon’ in Armenian): Hindu Kush;
- Southeastern Imeon: Badakhshan and Pamir;
- Northern Imeon: Alay Mountains and the Tian Shan ranges situated north of Fergana Valley;
- Northeastern Imeon: central and eastern part of Tian Shan

The mountains bordered the lands of China in the east, India in the south, Aria in the west (the region around modern Herat, marked as ‘Arya’ on Eremian's map), and Khwarezm in the northwest.

The mountain system was crossed by a segment of the Silk Road leading westwards from Yarkand to its midpoint at the Stone Tower as mentioned by Ptolemy (the exact location is a matter of ongoing debate), then through the Wakhan Corridor and Badakhshan to reach the ancient major city of Balh (Balkh). An alternative Northern Silk Road went from Kashgar to upper Alay Valley, then crossed the Alay Mountains to enter Fergana Valley.

Mount Imeon was famous for its lapis lazuli deposits in western Badakhshan, indicated on Shirakatsi's map. The mines at Sar-e-Sang have been producing lapis lazuli for millennia now, supplying the ancient civilizations of Egypt, Mesopotamia, India, and Rome, and still yielding the world's finest lapis. The Venetian adventurer Marco Polo visited the mines in 1271 during his famous journey to China, following the Silk Road to cross the mountains by way of Wakhan.

== Population ==
According to Ashharatsuyts, the Central Asian territory west of Imeon was inhabited in Antiquity by fifteen old artisan and trading nations: Massagetae, Bulhi, Khwarezmians (‘Horozmiki’) etc., and by 43 nomadic tribes including the Hephthalites and Alchons.

== Honour ==
Imeon Range on Smith Island in the South Shetland Islands, Antarctica is named after Mount Imeon.

== See also ==
- Anariacae
- Roof of the World
