= Stone Tower (Ptolemy) =

Midpoint on the Silk Road of antiquity

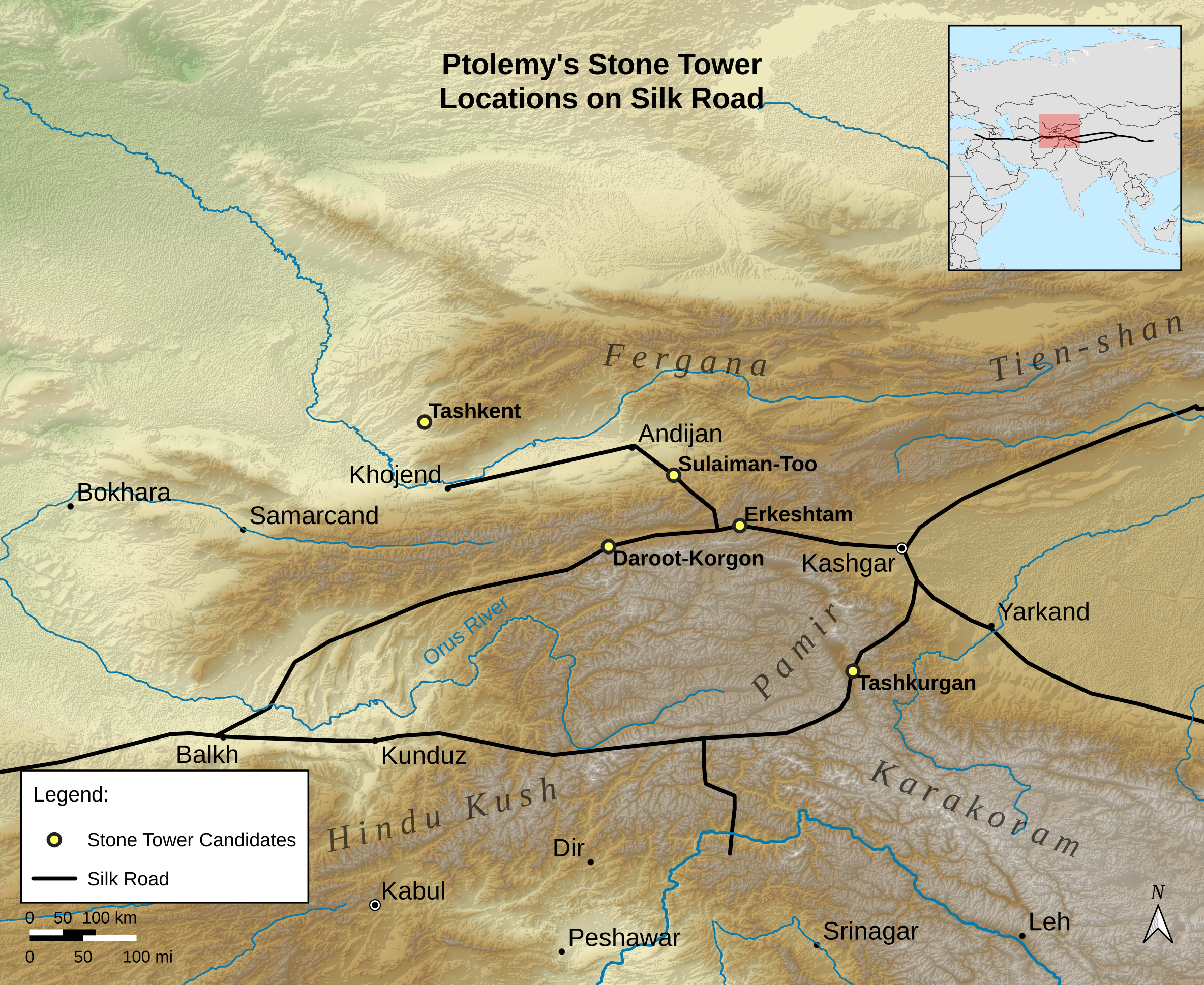
Map of candidate locations for Ptolemy's Stone Tower.

1 / Tashkent; 2 / Daroot-Korgon	3 / Sulaiman-Too; 4 / Erkeshtam	5 / Tashkurgan

Claudius Ptolemy, the Greco-Egyptian geographer of Alexandria, wrote about a "Stone Tower" (λίθινος πύργος, Lithinos Pyrgos in Greek, Turris Lapidea in Latin) which marked the midpoint on the ancient Silk Road – the network of overland trade routes taken by caravans between Europe and Asia. It was the most important landmark on this route, where caravans stopped on their difficult and dangerous journeys to allow travellers to take on provisions, rest, and trade goods before continuing on.

Ptolemy's famous treatise on cartography, Geography, was written around 140 CE, comprising eight books, and is the only text on this subject to have survived in entirety from classical antiquity. It has had a profound influence through the ages on not only cartography but also the history of ancient geography. In Book I he mentions the Stone Tower ten times, and with a familiarity that suggests this was a well-known and established landmark. He refers to it just once more, in his gazetteer in Book VI when he details the Seventh Map of Asia, and on this occasion goes further to reveal its coordinates as longitude 135 and latitude 43 degrees north on his gradation system. But the Stone Tower's actual location has been vigorously debated by researchers and historians over the centuries because, despite his coordinates, the information Ptolemy (and other scholars from his era) left behind is simply not precise enough. In part, this is due to the rudimentary methods caravans employed while surveying routes in distant lands, on the basis of which ancient cartographers drew their maps. If the Stone Tower could be pin-pointed then not only would this be of great significance to the study of ancient geography, but it would allow other important landmarks in this region, similarly (and imprecisely) detailed by Ptolemy, to be more closely located. Identifying an actual location for this site would also allow archaeological work to be more targeted, increasing the chance of successful excavations.

The Stone Tower is also mentioned by the fourth century historian Ammianus Marcellinus. In his History (23.6.60) he writes: "Next to these are the Sacae, a tribe of savages, inhabiting a rough country rich only for cattle, and hence without cities. It is overhung by the mountains Ascanimia and Comedus, along the base of which and through a village, which they call Lithinos Pyrgos [The Stone Tower], a very long road extends, which is the route taken by the traders who journey from time to time to the land of the Seres."

A brief survey of literature reveals the long-standing disagreements by geographers and historians to locate the Stone Tower: As far back as the 11th century Al-Biruni suggested it was the city of Tashkent (which means "castle of stone"); Pyrgos can mean fortified town or fortress. In the 19th century, Joseph Hager too maintained it was Tashkent, partly based on the striking coincidence of the city being on supposedly the same latitude of 43 degrees north (in fact it is 41.2 degrees north); while Jean Baptiste Bourguignon d'Anville identified it with the fortress of Aatas, 7 degrees northwest of Kashgar; and James Bell argued it was near the Pass of Chiltung in the Pamirs. Henry Yule located it nearby at Daraut-Kurgan, while William Bevan and William Smith thought the Stone Tower was probably the same as the "Hormeterium" (or "merchants' station" which Ptolemy also writes about) and located it near the Sulaiman-Too mountain in Osh. Edward Bunbury thought the information given was too vague to precisely determine its location. Ferdinand von Richthofen also discussed its possible locations.

In the 20th century, Joseph Hackin travelled there and thought it was at Tashkurgan, while Albert Herrmann placed it in the vicinity of Daraut-Kurgan. Aurel Stein, who perhaps most extensively travelled this region, suggested the valley of Karategin was the area Ptolemy referred to "when the traveller ascended the ravine" and so proposed a site near Daraut-Kurgan, and J. Oliver Thomson agrees it should be nearby.

From the turn of this century, Claude Rapin (2001) has suggested it is Sulaiman-Too; while Paul Bernard (2005), by carefully tracing the route taken by the caravan of Maes Titianos, locates the Stone Tower near Daraut-Kurgan; and Igor Vasilevich Piankov (2014), after also considering information drawn from contemporary sailors, agrees with him. Irina Tupikova et al. (2014), following "the application of spherical trigonometry for the recalculation of Ptolemy's coordinates", concluded that it "can with great probability be identified as Tashkurgan". Riaz Dean (2022) also uses a new methodology, by proposing a set of four criteria, and three additional reasons based on historical considerations, to locate this landmark, and identifies it as Sulaiman-Too. Sitta von Reden (2023) agrees with Dean that the Stone Tower can be seen in Osh, Kyrgyzstan.

All in all, there are four sites that are most often identified as the likely location of the Stone Tower: (i) the city of Tashkent, in Uzbekistan; (ii) the Sulaiman-Too mountain in Osh, Kyrgyzstan; (iii) the town of Daraut-Kurgan in south-western Kyrgyzstan; and (iv) the town of Tashkurgan, in Xinjiang, China. Some historians also consider the "Hormeterium" which Ptolemy mentioned to be one and the same as the Stone Tower, and believe this landmark to be the settlement of Irkeshtam (however, Ptolemy specifically states in his Geography that this station lay 5 degrees further east).

All four sites mentioned above, as well as Irkeshtam, can be seen on the Map of Silk Roads over the Roof of Asia and on Map 4 in The Stone Tower: Ptolemy, the Silk Road, and a 2,000-year-old Riddle.
