= National Historical and Archaeological Museum Complex Sulayman =

- Национальный Историко-археологический музейный комплекс «Сулайман-Тоо»
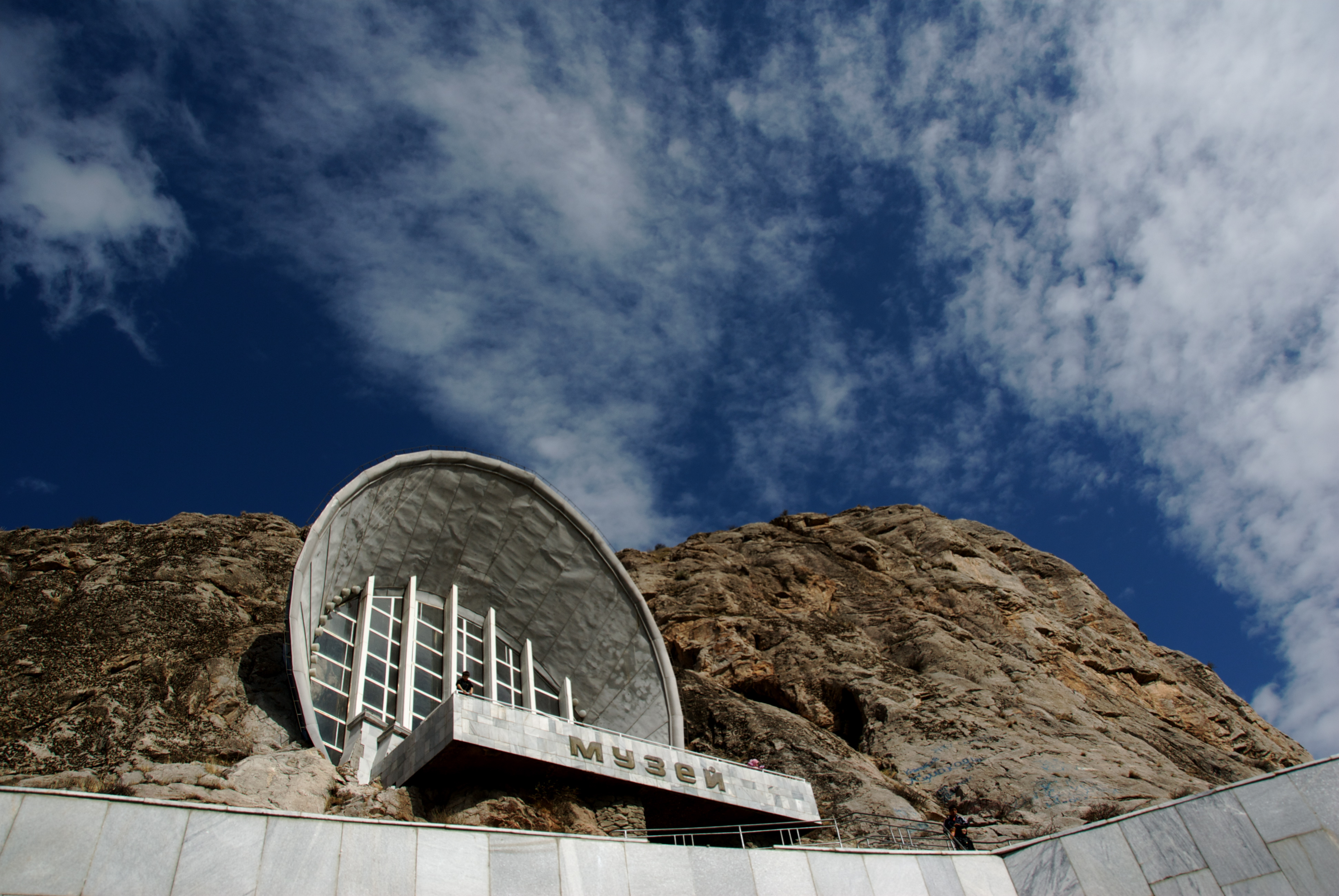
- Established: 1949
- Location: Osh, Kyrgyzstan
- Coordinates: 40.5285°N 72.7837°E
- Type: Historical and archeological museum
- Director: Abdraiym Turganbaev

The National Historical and Archaeological Museum Complex Sulayman (Russian: Национальный Историко-археологический музейный комплекс «Сулайман-Тоо») is a museum in Osh, Kyrgyzstan. It was established in 1949 as Osh Regional Museum. The present museum building was completed during the Soviet era in 1978 to celebrate the 3,000th anniversary of the city of Osh. It was carved inside the Sulayman Mountain, which became a UNESCO World Heritage Site in 2009. The structure represents a glassed concrete arch that closes the entry to the cave.

The National Historical and Archaeological Museum Complex Sulayman is one of the largest museums in Kyrgyzstan. The collections include more than 33,000 pieces of archaeological and ethnographic facts, works of handicraft, paintings, sculptures and graphics.
