= Sulayman Mountain =

Sulaiman-Too Sacred Mountain
UNESCO World Heritage Site
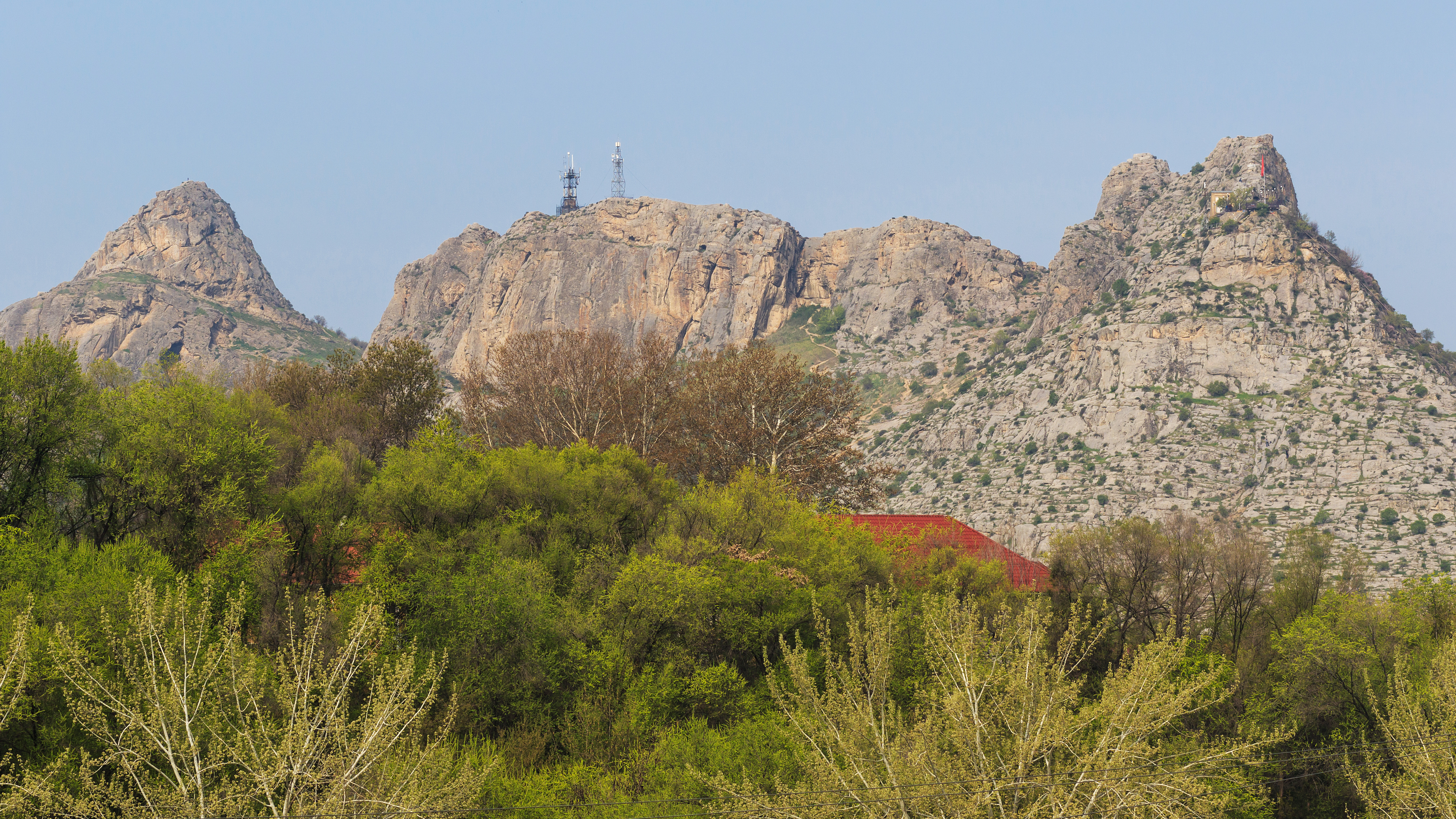

- Location within Kyrgyzstan Location within West and Central Asia
- Location: Kyrgyzstan
- Criteria: Cultural: (iii), (vi)
- Reference: 1230rev
- Inscription: 2009 (33rd Session)
- Area: 112 ha (280 acres)
- Buffer zone: 4,788 ha (11,830 acres)
- Coordinates: 40°31′52″N 72°46′58″E

The Sulayman Mountain (Kyrgyz: Сулайман-Тоо, romanized: Sulaiman-Too, lit. 'Sulayman Rock') is the only World Heritage Site located entirely in the country of Kyrgyzstan. (Note: Kyrgyzstan shares the Tian-Shan Silk Road Site with China and Kazakhstan. The Western Tien-Shan site is shared with Kazakhstan and Uzbekistan.) It is located in the city of Osh and was once a major place of pre-Muslim pilgrimage.

== History ==
This mountain is thought by some researchers and historians to be the famous landmark of antiquity known as the "Stone Tower", which Claudius Ptolemy wrote about in his treatise Geography. The Stone Tower marked the midpoint on the ancient Silk Road, the overland trade route taken by caravans between Europe and Asia.

== Sulayman Shrine ==
Sulayman (Solomon) is a prophet in the Qur'an, and the mountain contains a shrine that supposedly marks his grave. Women who ascend to the shrine on top and crawl though an opening across the holy rock will, according to legend, give birth to healthy children. The trees and bushes on the mountain are draped with numerous "prayer flags", small pieces of cloth that are tied to them.

== Area protection ==
According to the UNESCO, the mountain is "the most complete example of a sacred mountain anywhere in Central Asia, worshipped over several millennia". The site is still a popular place for local Muslims, with stairs leading up to the highest peak where there stands a small mosque originally built by Babur in 1510. Much of the mosque was reconstructed in the late 20th century.

The rock also contains the National Historical and Archaeological Museum Complex Sulayman that was built during the Soviet era, showing archaeological findings from the area and its history. The lower slope of the mountain is surrounded by a cemetery.

== Gallery ==
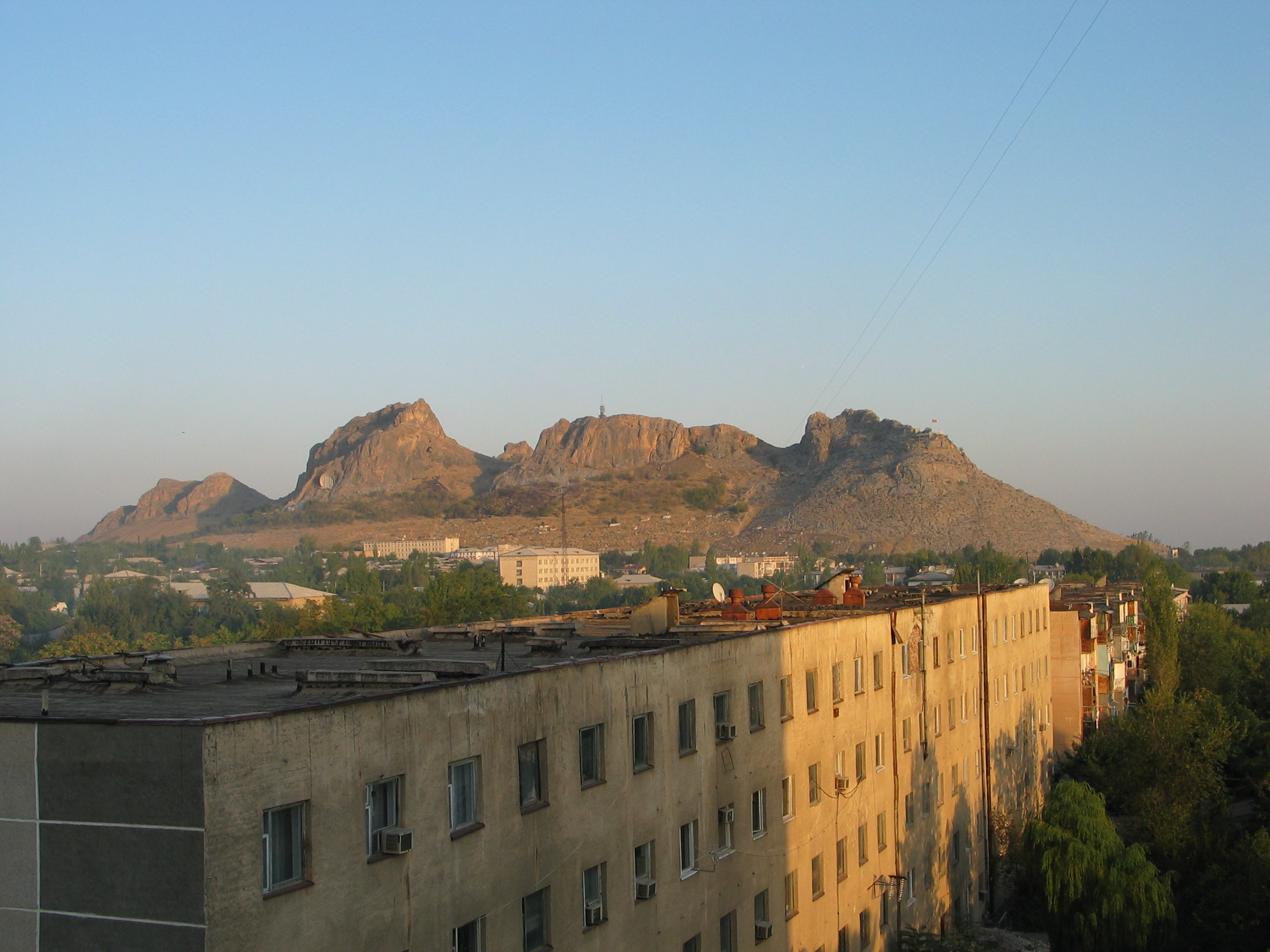
View of the mountain from the city of Osh

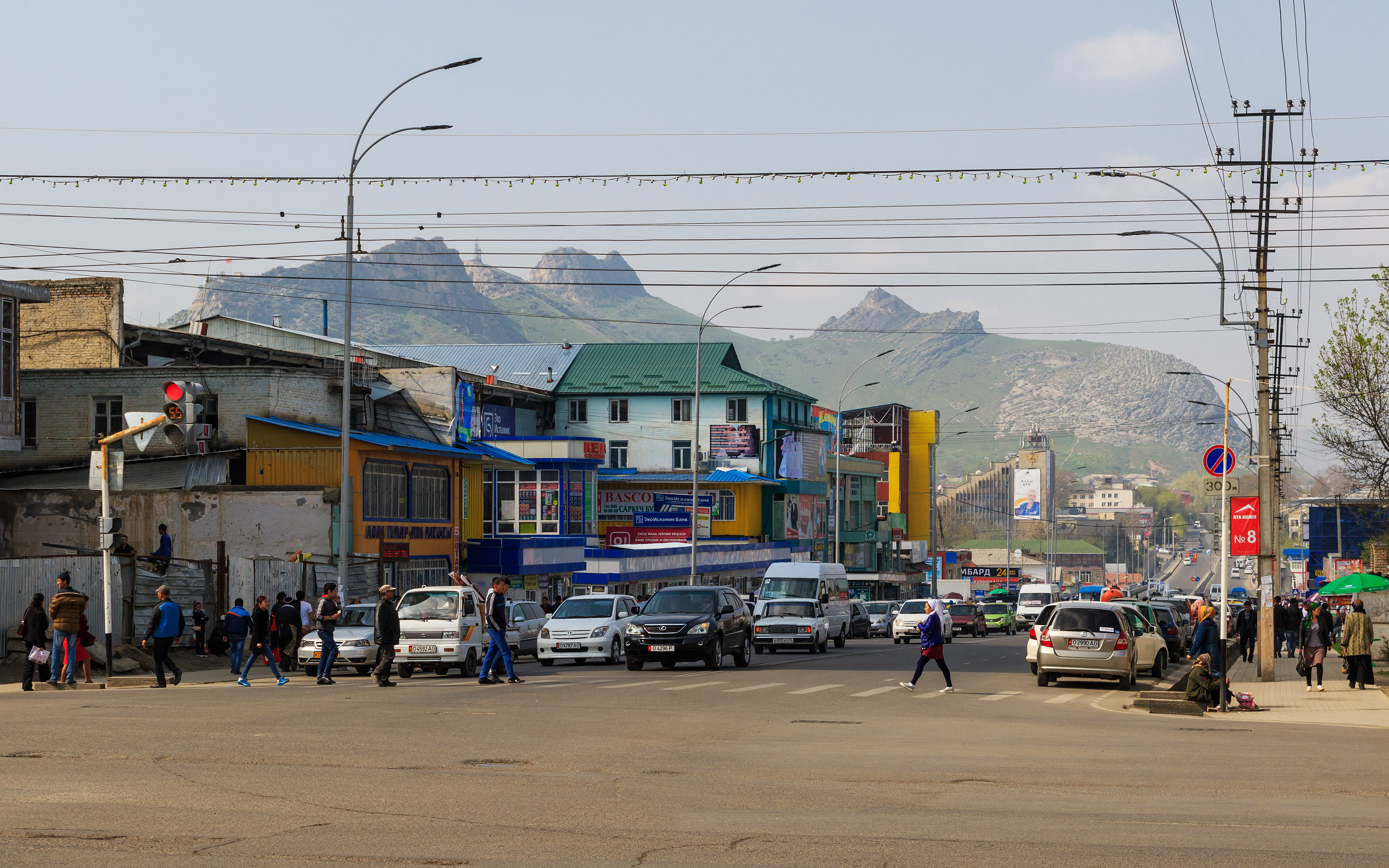
View of the five peaks from Alishir Navoi Street

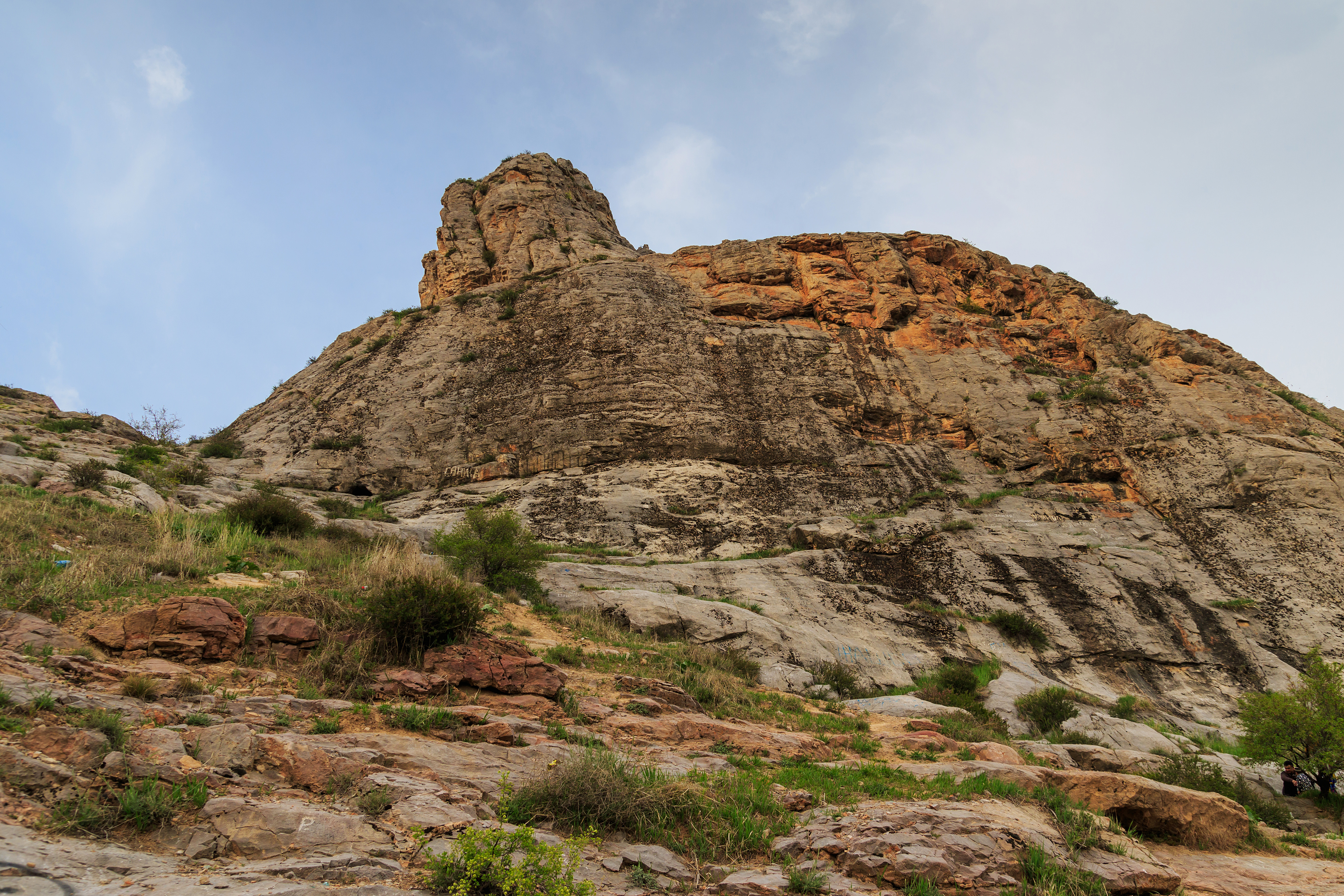
Rock formations on one of the summits

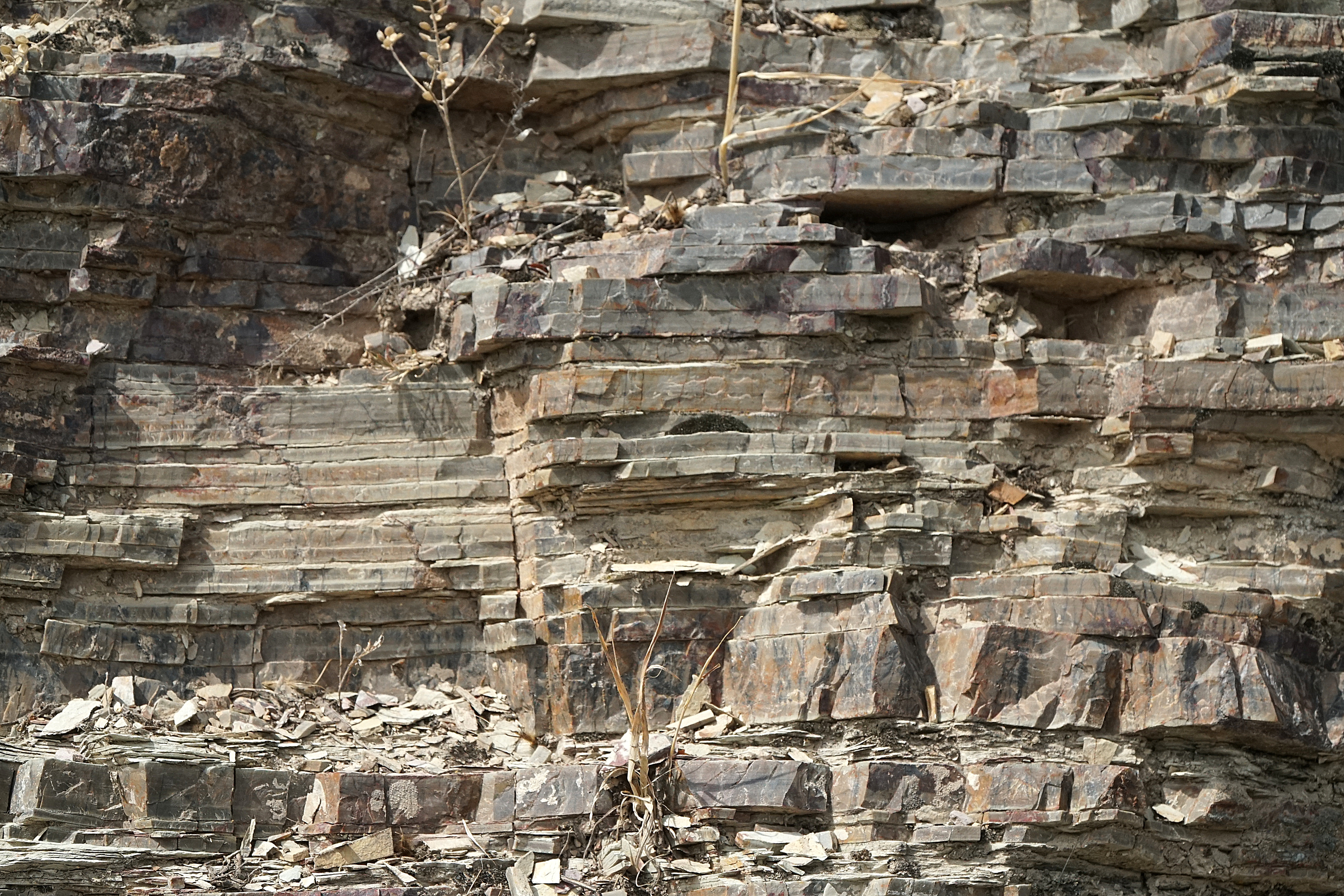
Detail of sedimentary rock strata (horizontal bedding)

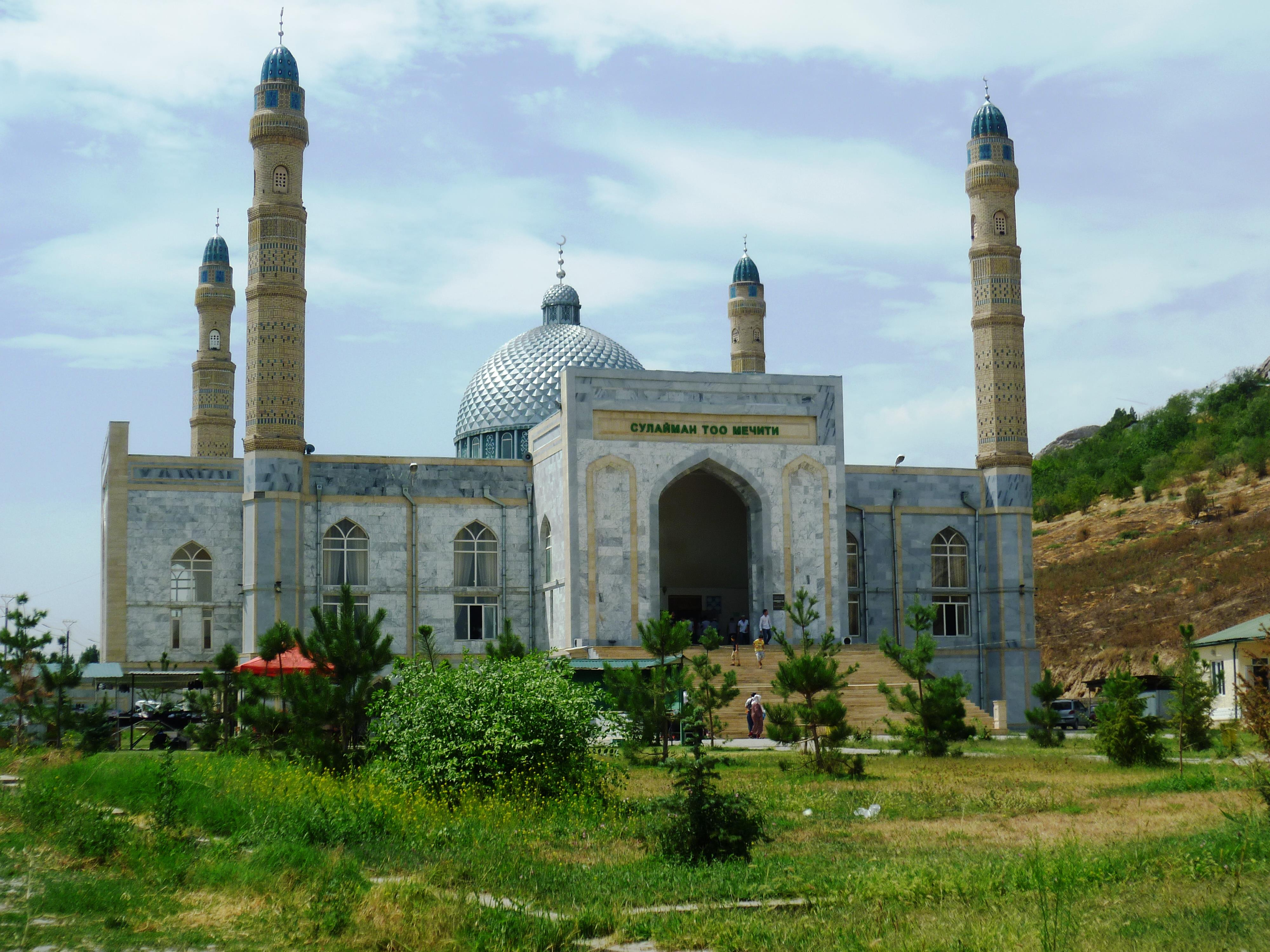
The Sulaiman-Too Mosque, Osh, Kyrgyzstan

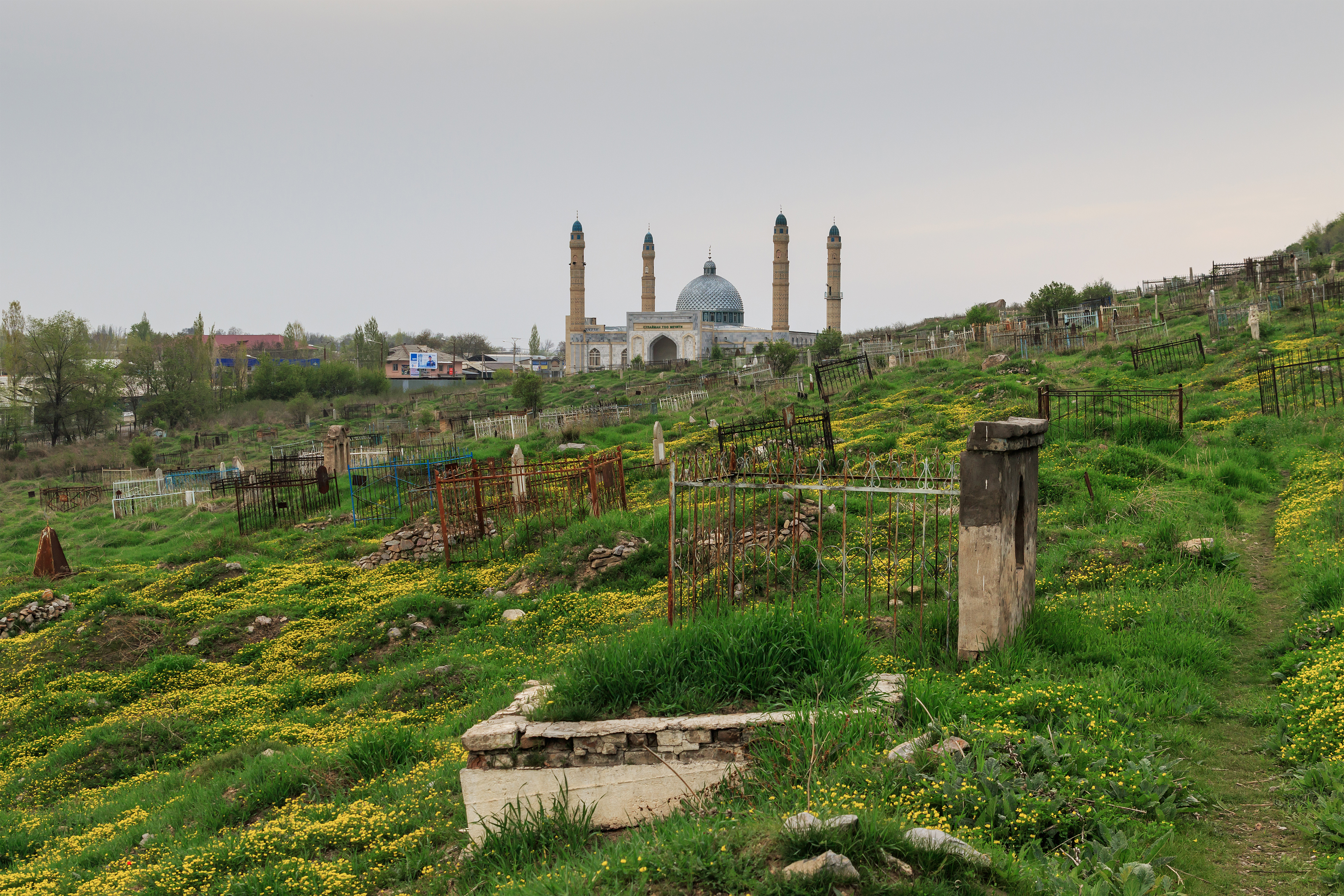
Cemetery on lower slopes with Sulayman-Too Mosque in background

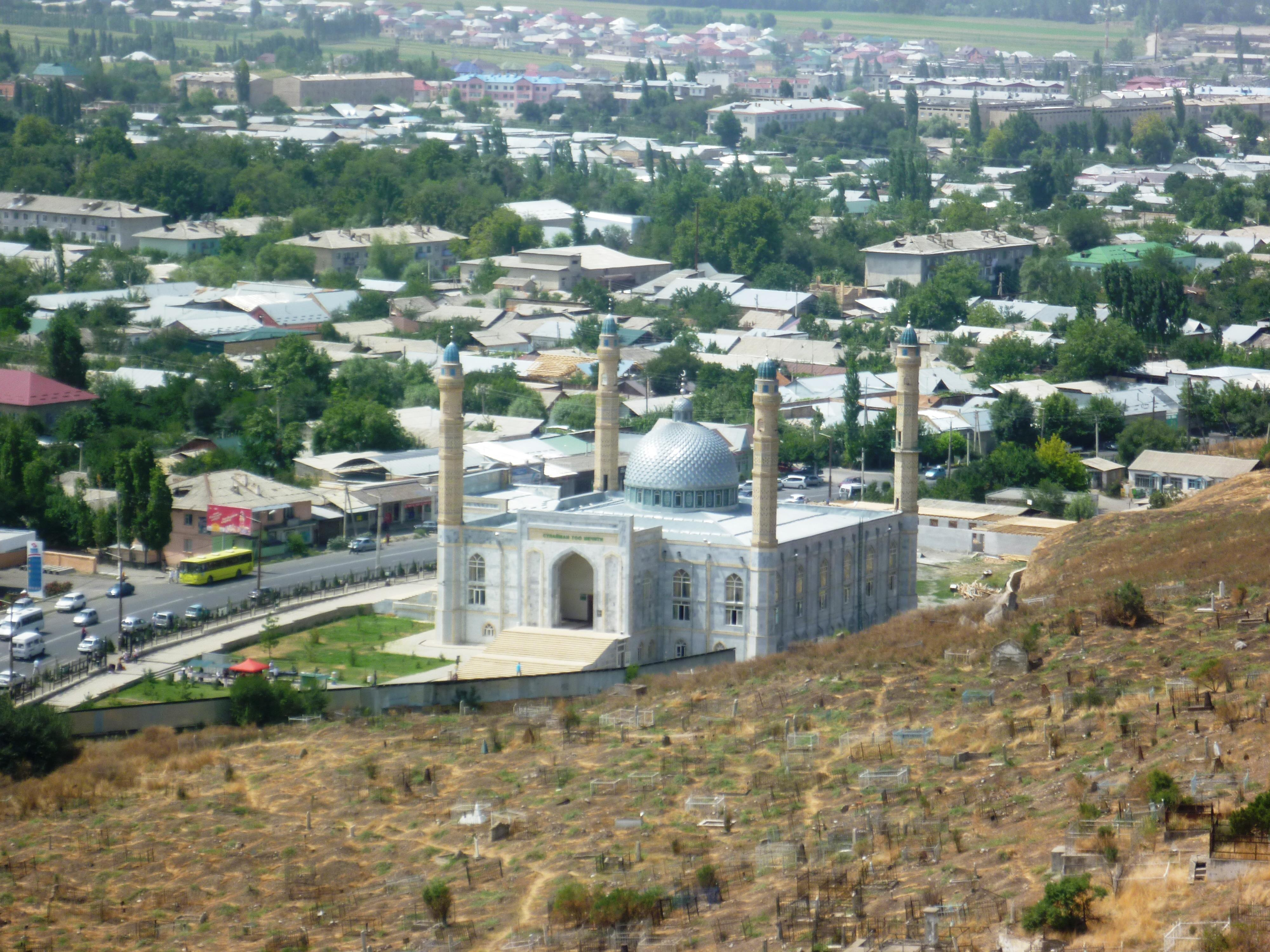
View of Osh seen downhill across cemetery and mosque

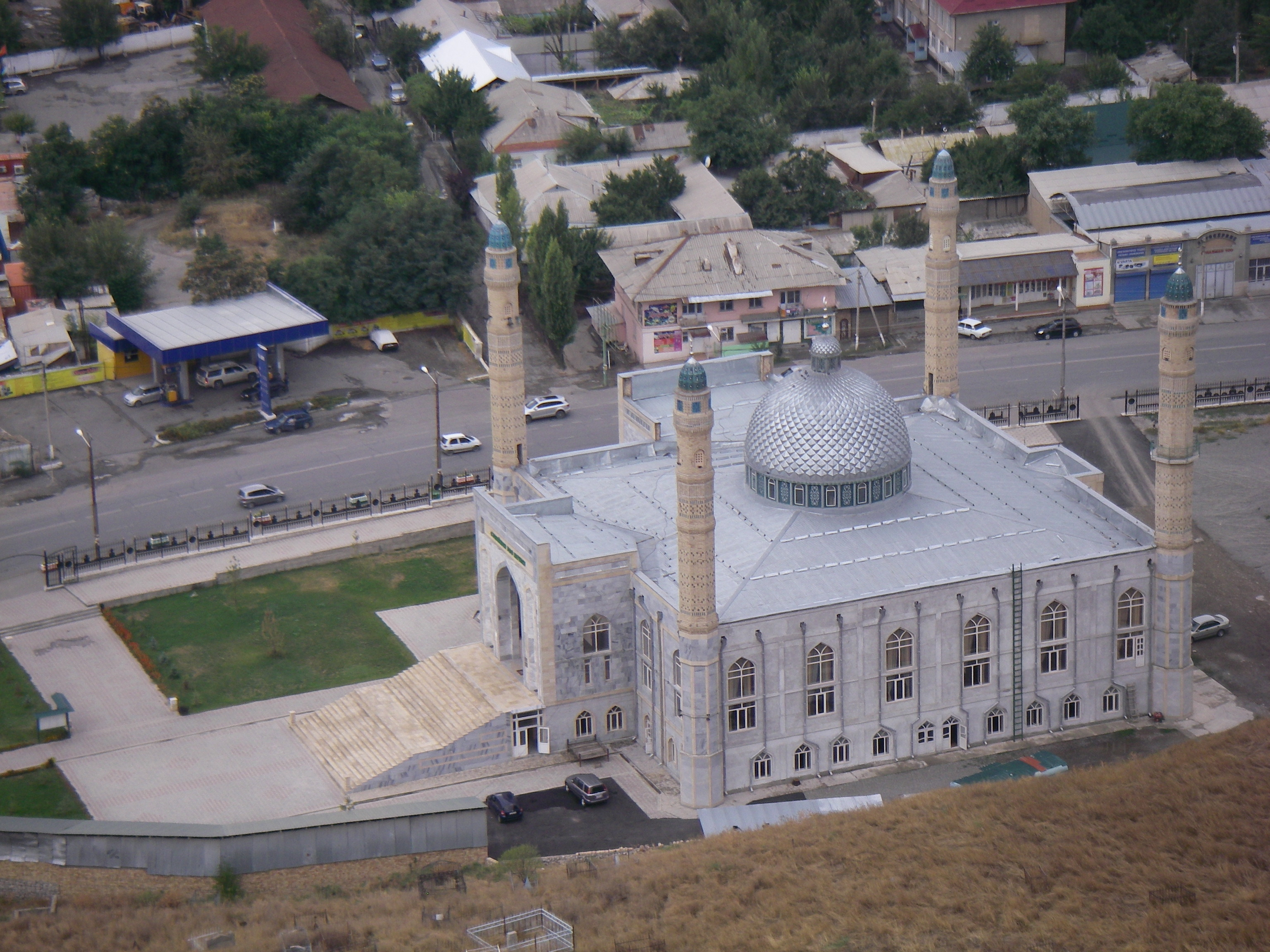
Mosque, viewed from above

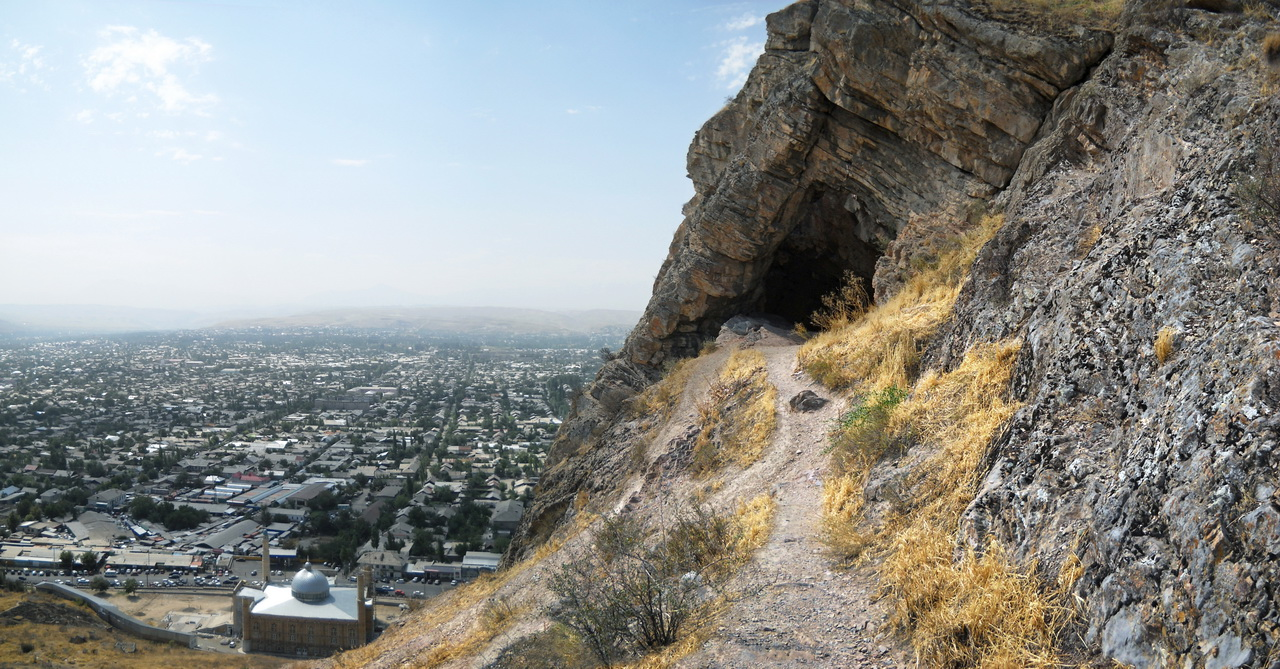
Panorama of Osh, (mosque in foreground) viewed from track to one of mountain caves

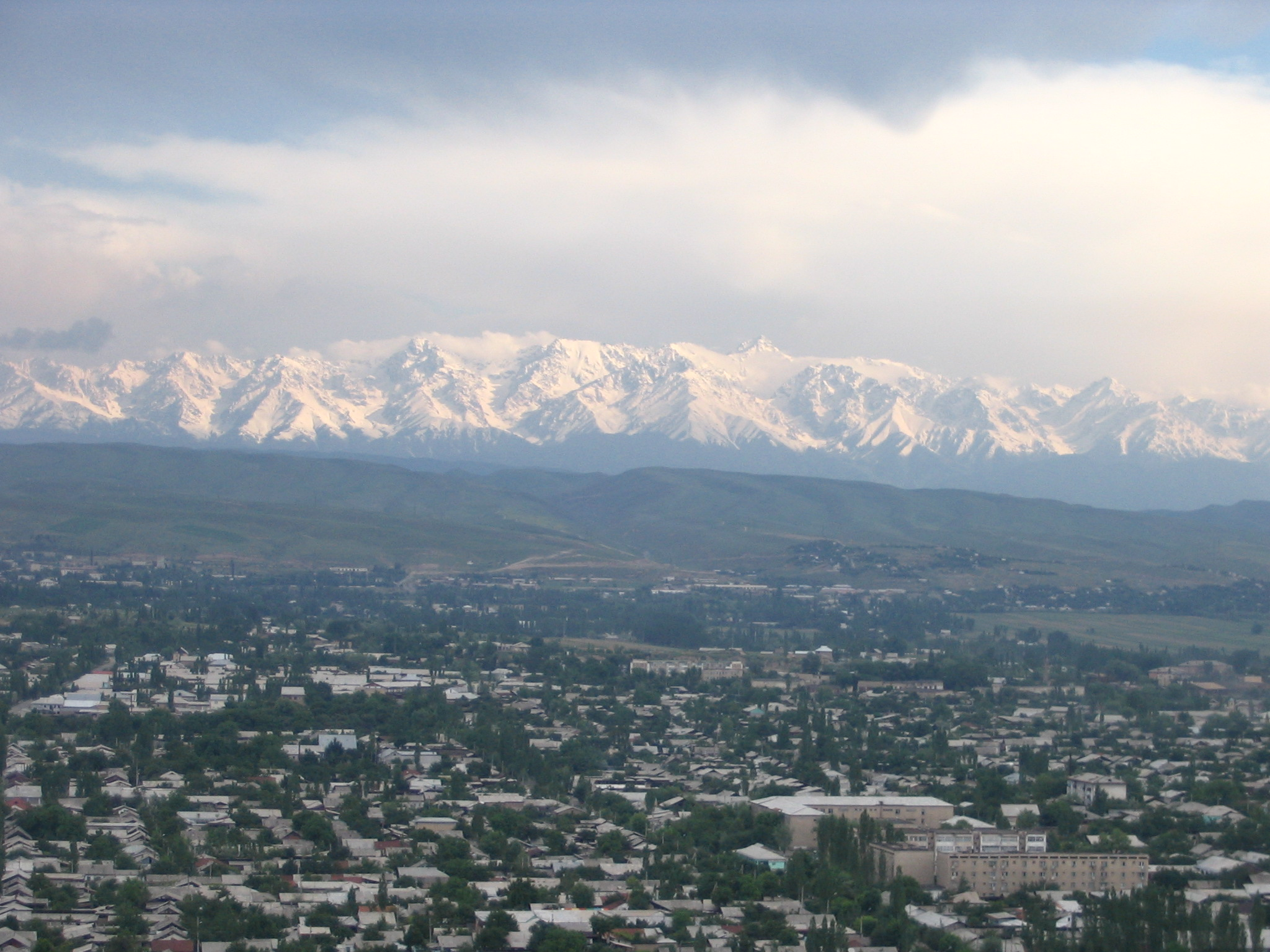
Panorama of Osh showing high, snow-capped peaks of the Alay Range to the south of city

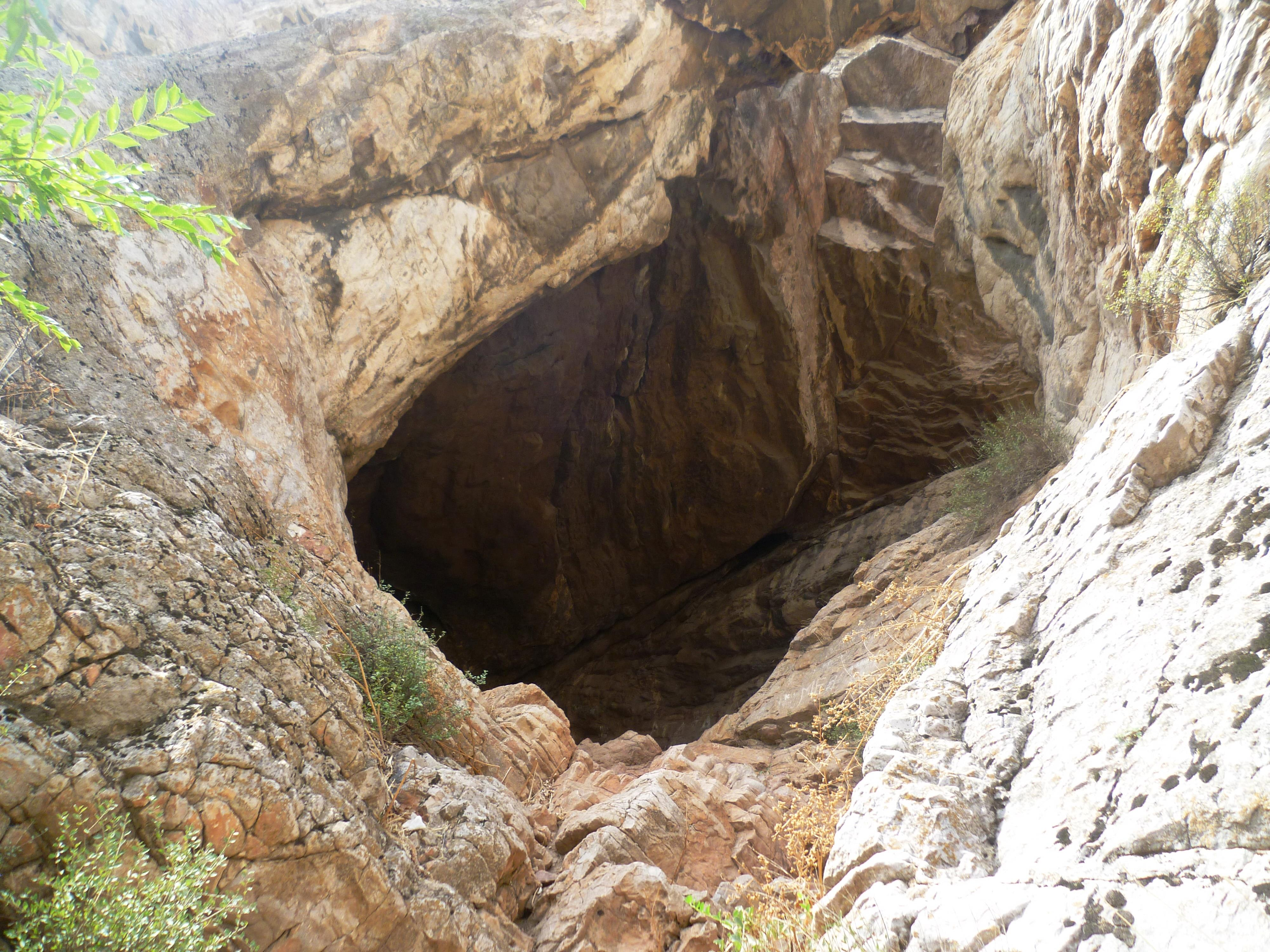
Detail of one of the mountain's caves

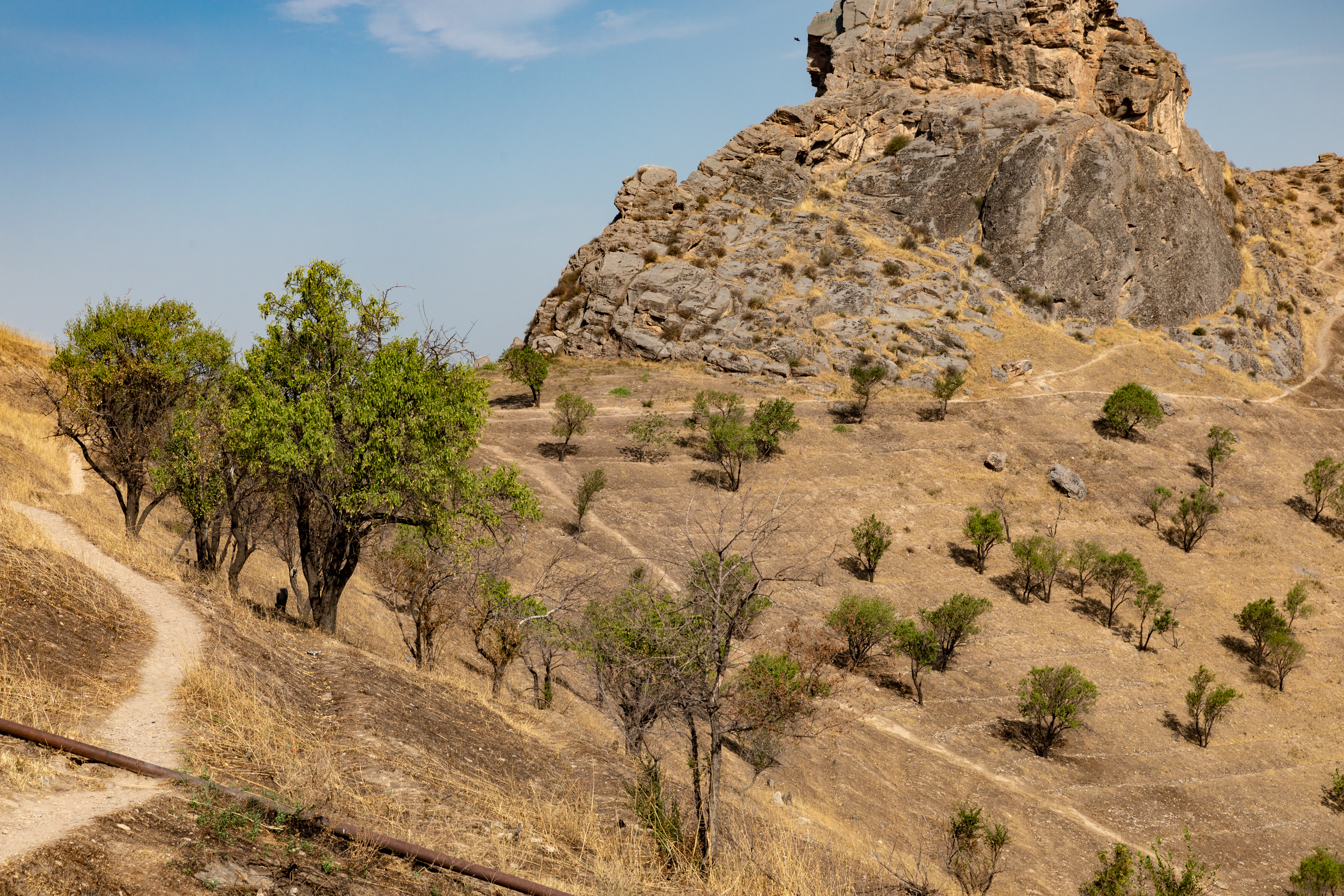
Sparse tree cover on arid upper slopes

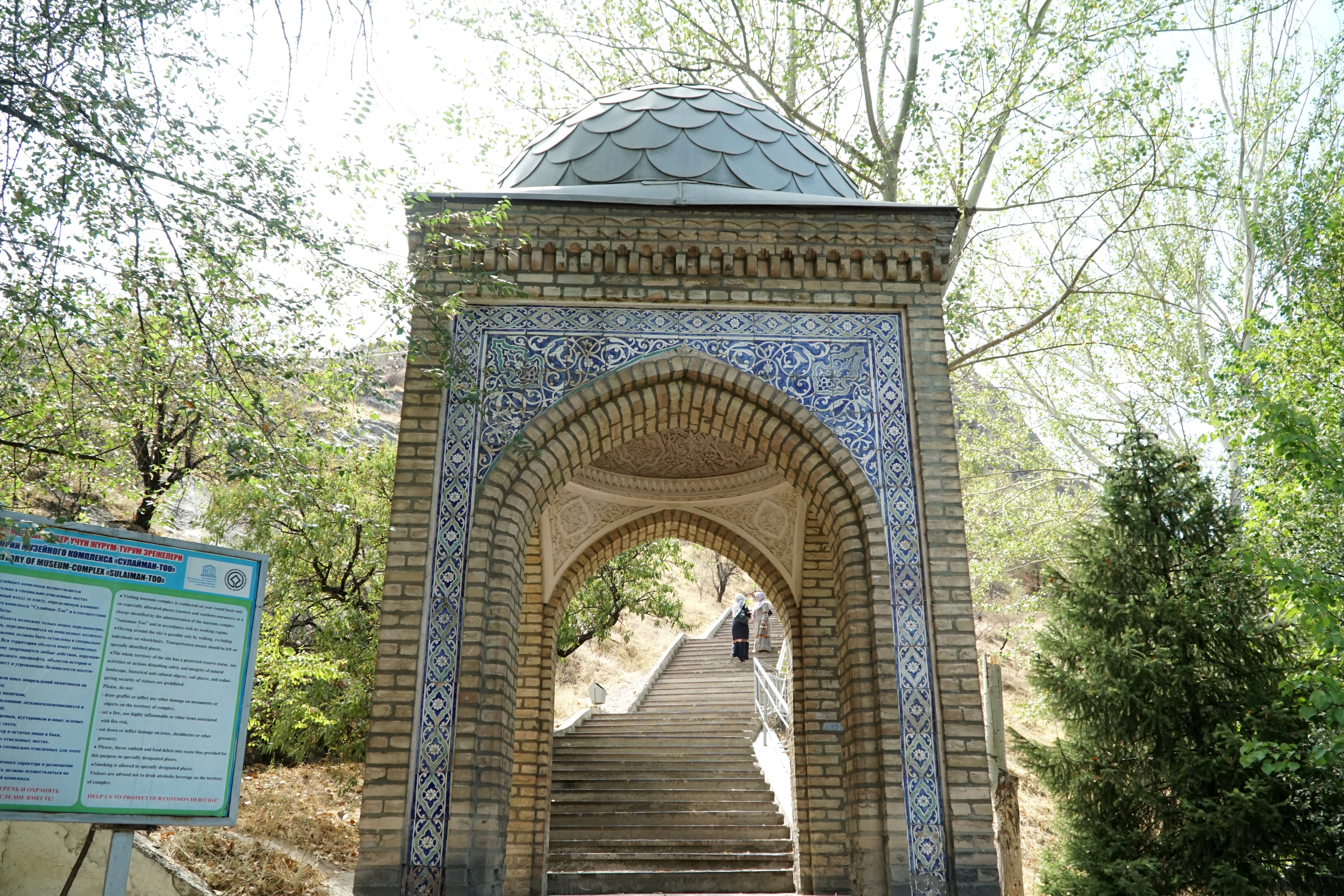
Decorative gateway to staircase leading to museum precinct

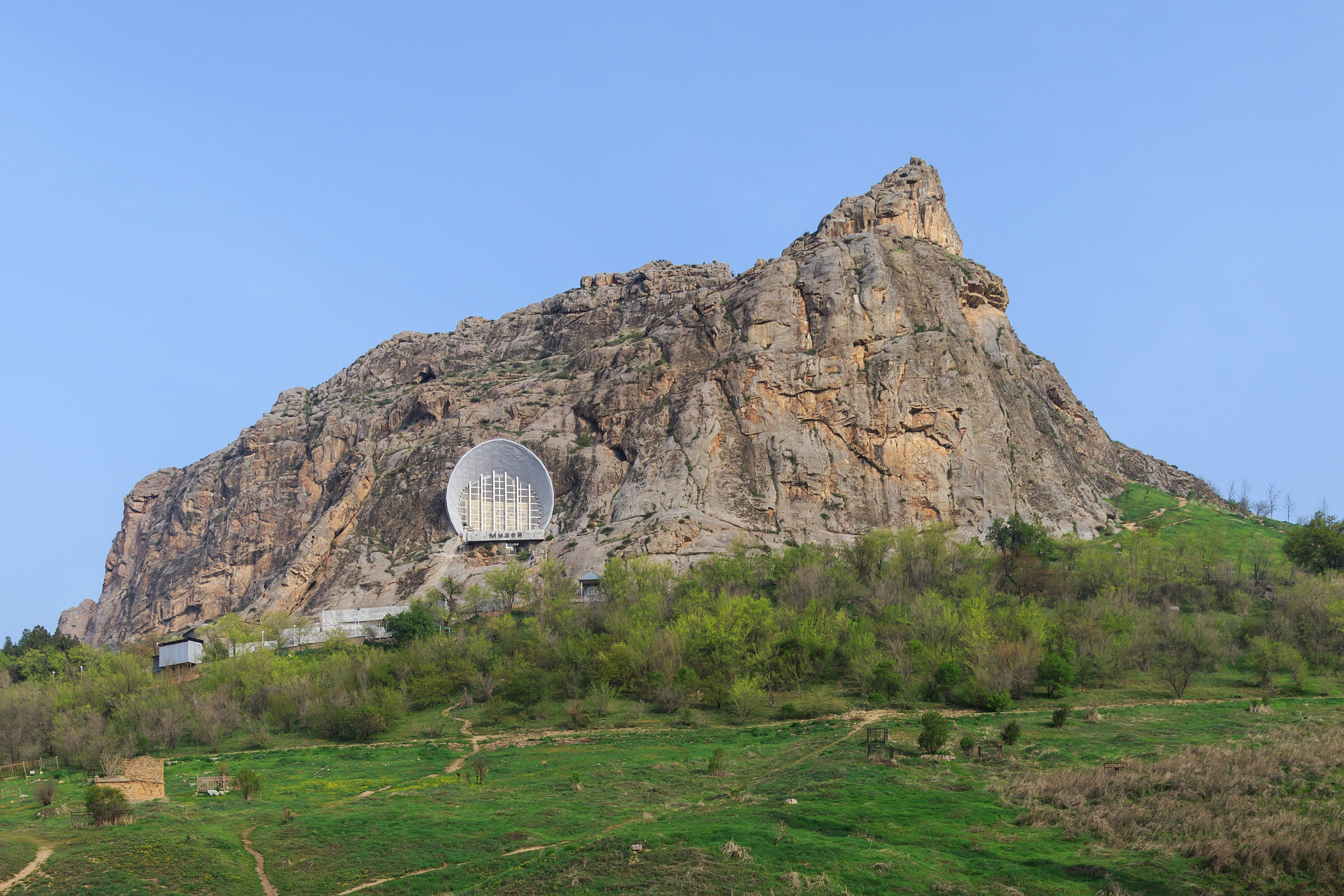
Sulayman-Too Archeological Museum on one of peaks

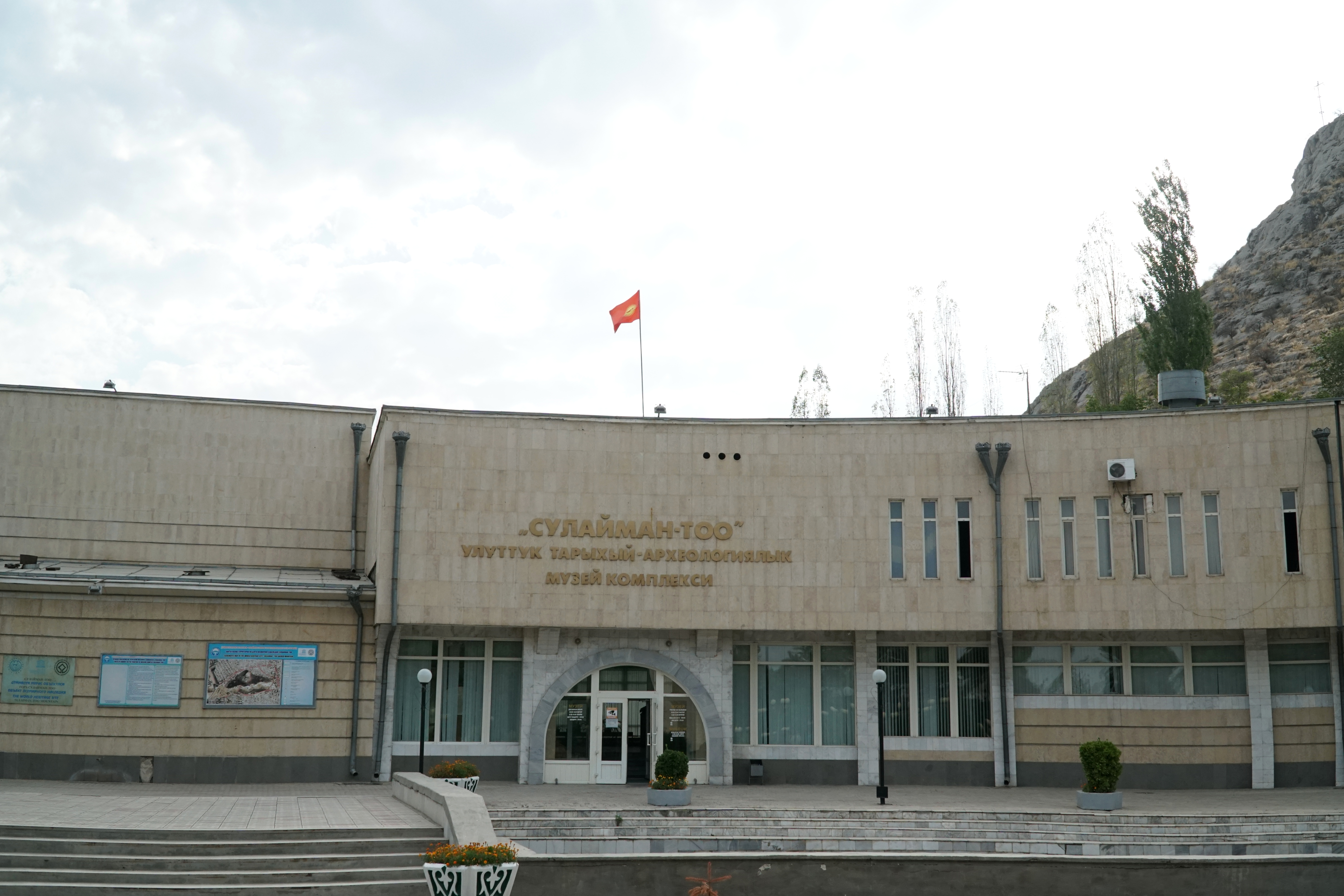
Archeological Museum entrance

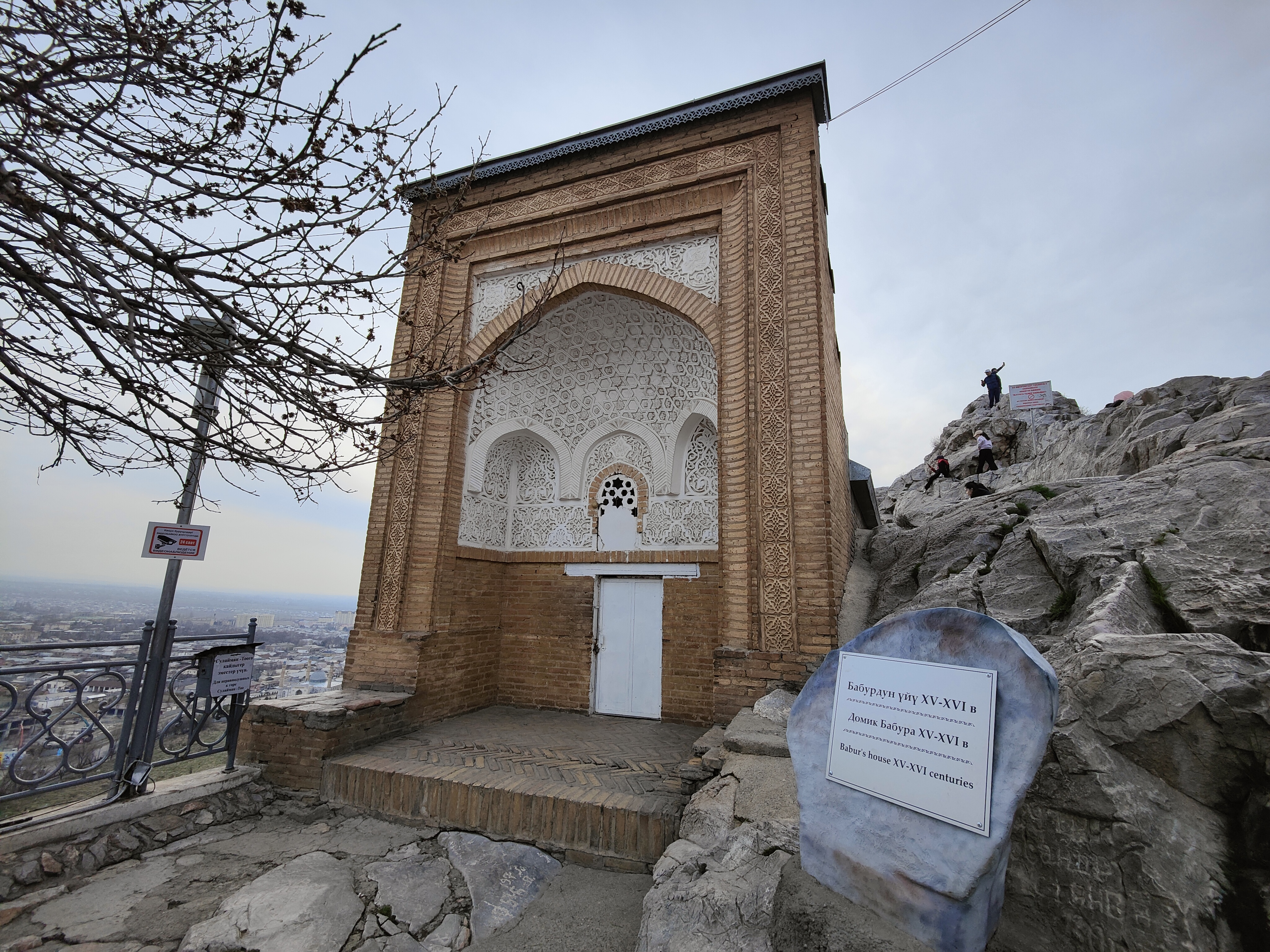
House of Babur exterior

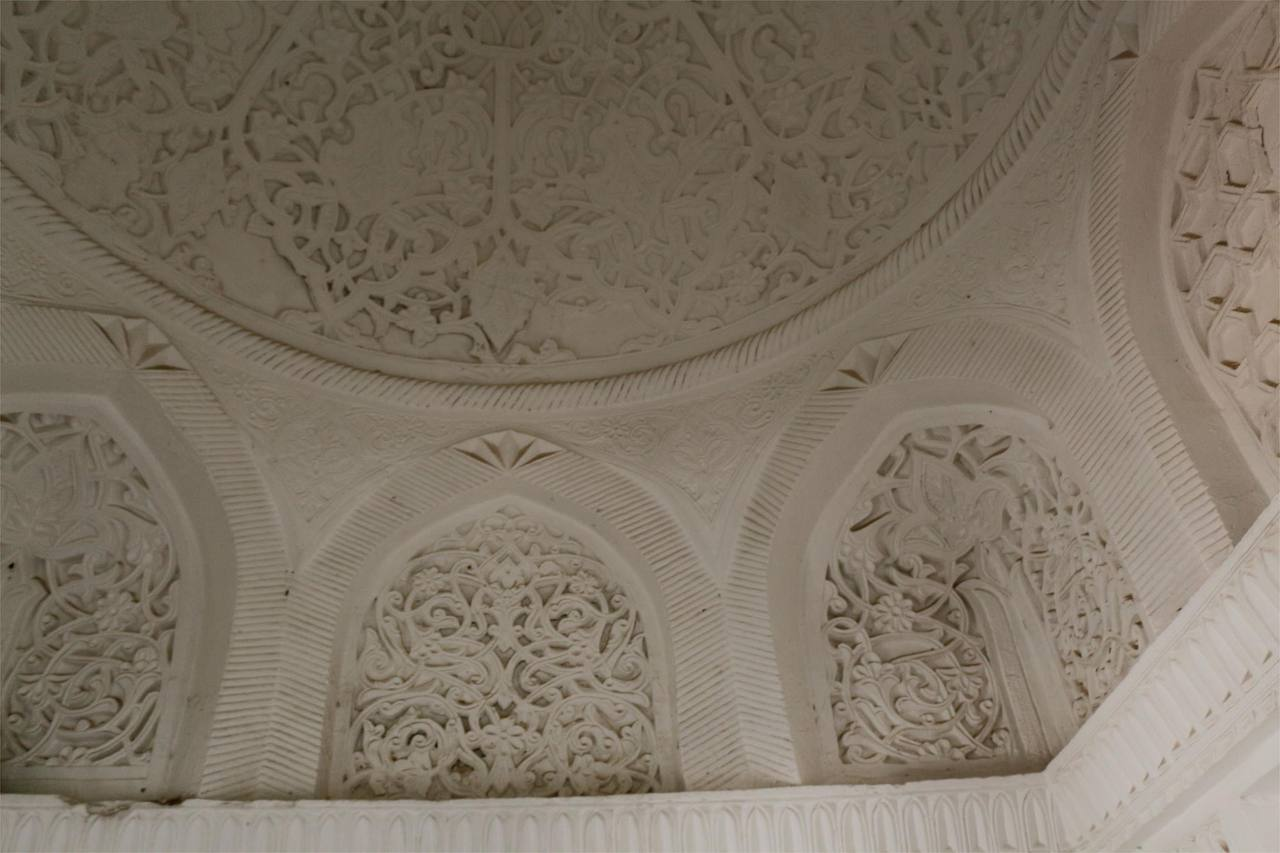
House of Babur interior

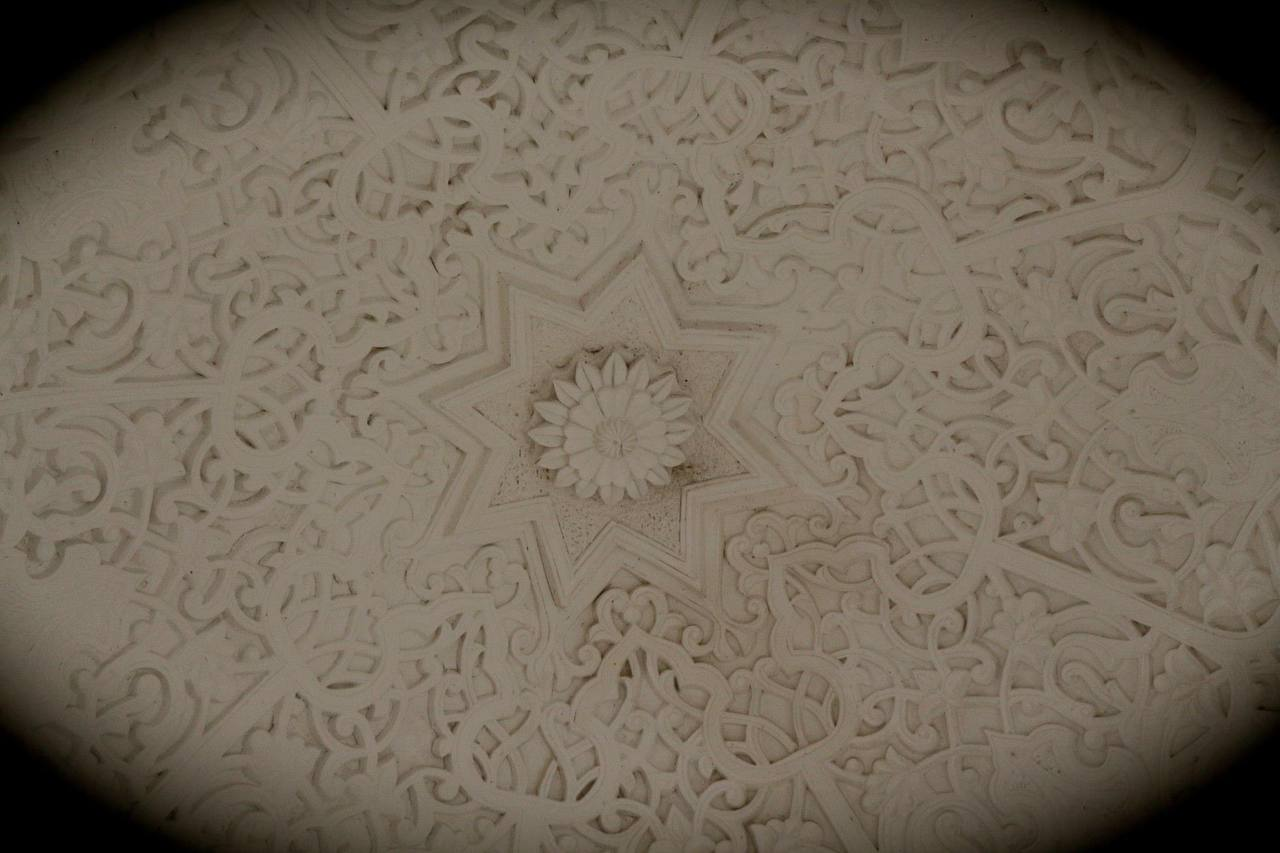
House of Babur detail of dome interior

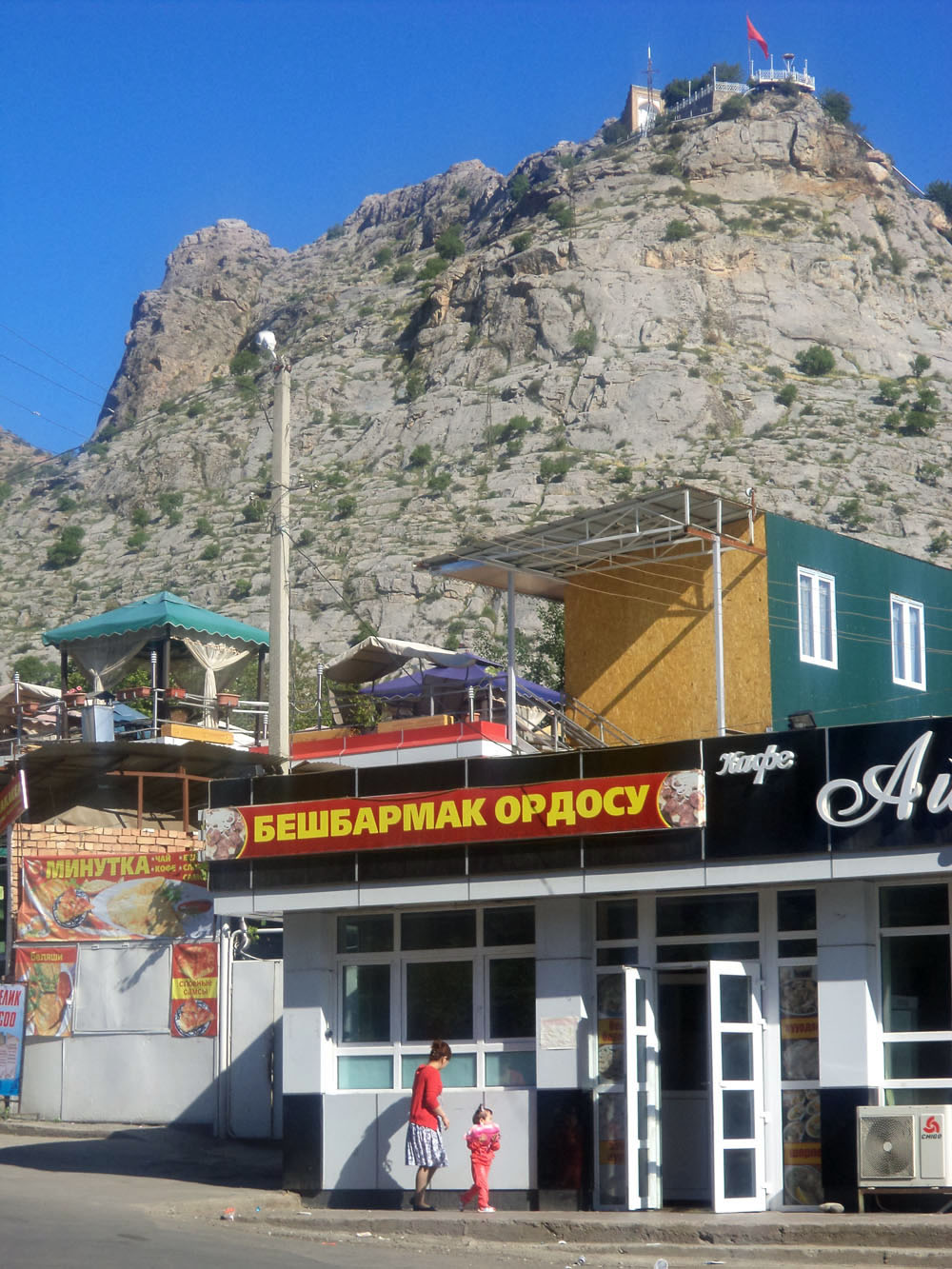
Café at base (viewing platform and House of Babur visible in background)

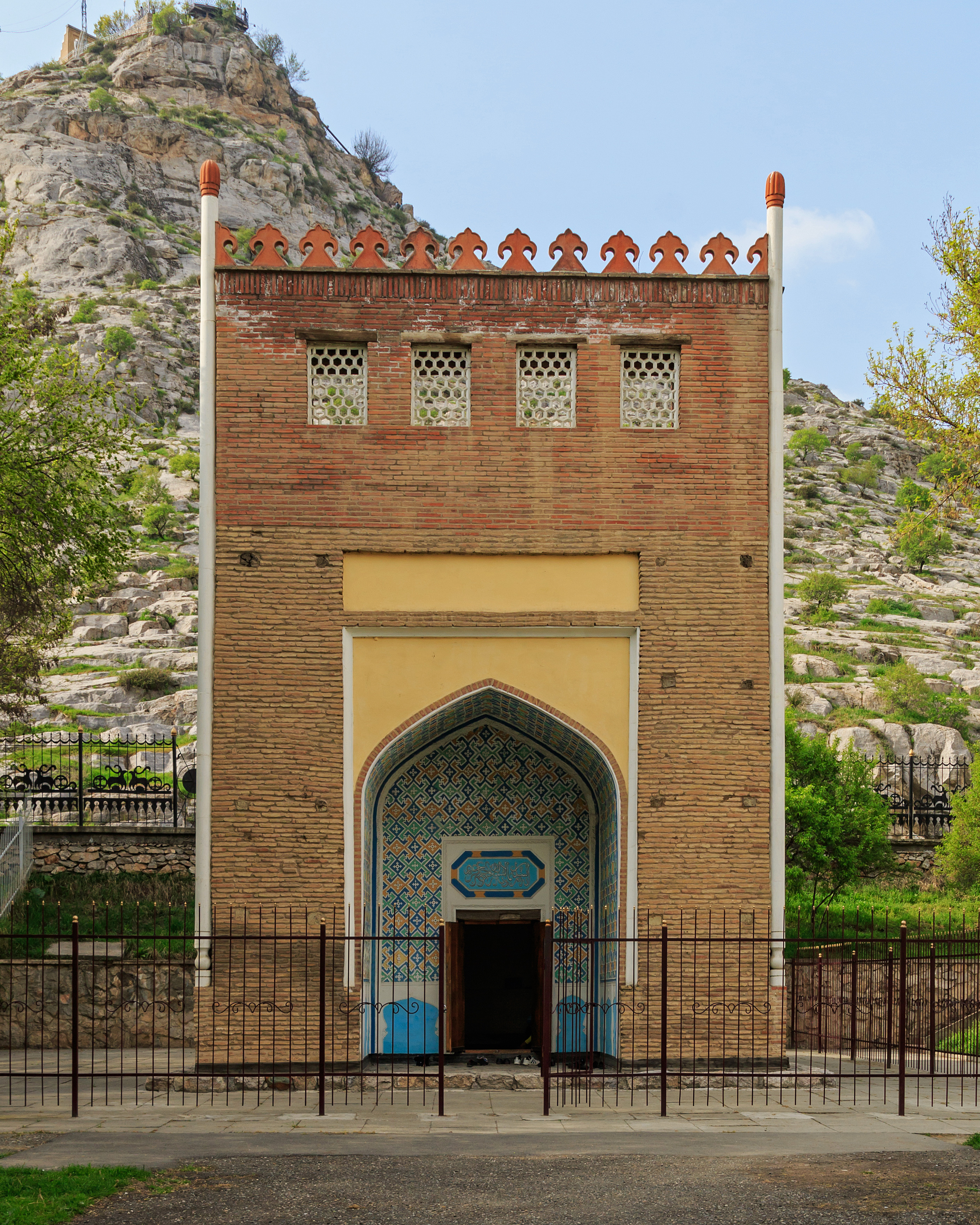
Mausoleum of Asif ibn Barkhiya

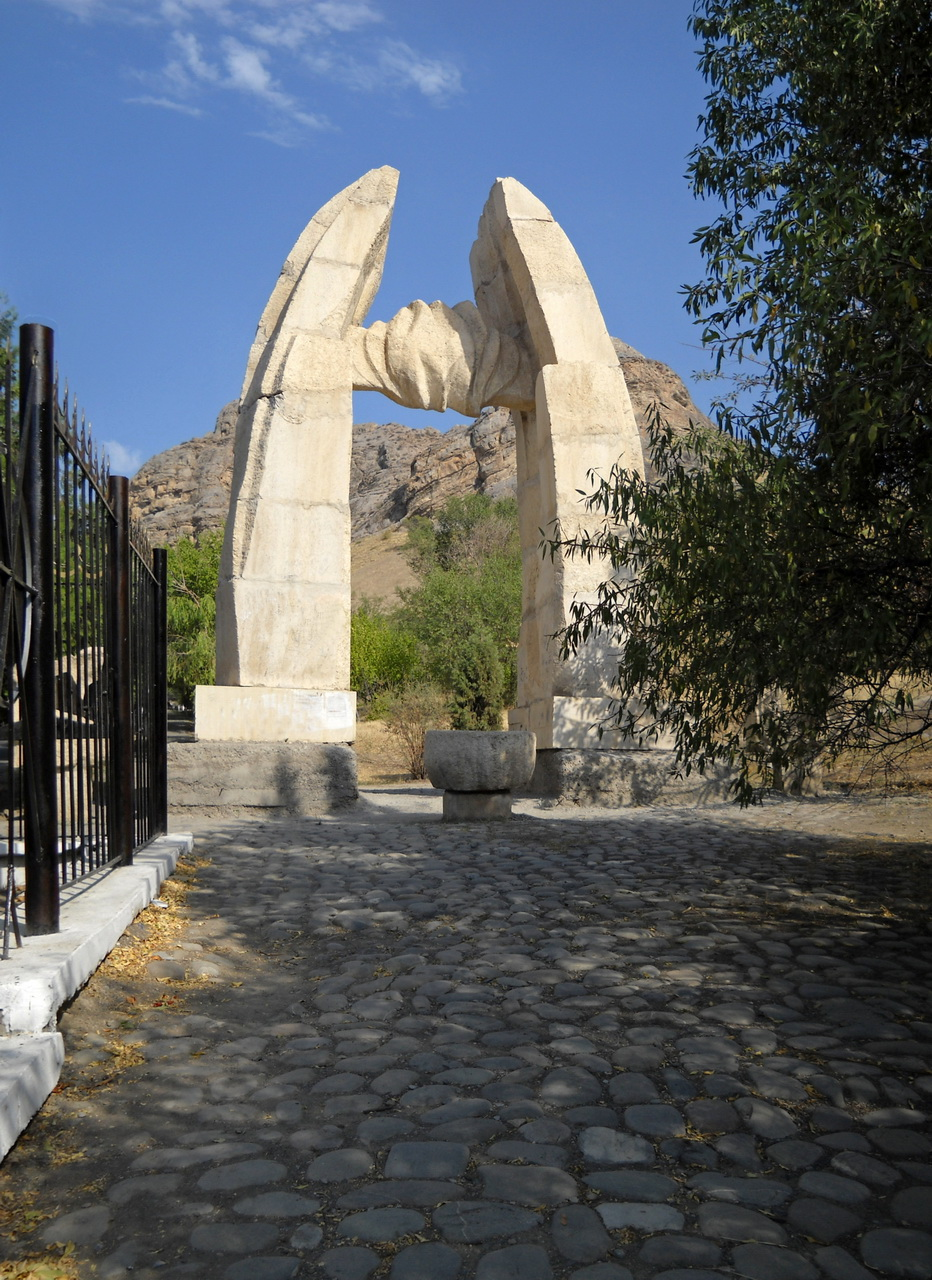
The Gates of Fire (commemorating Zoroastrian fire temple on mountain)

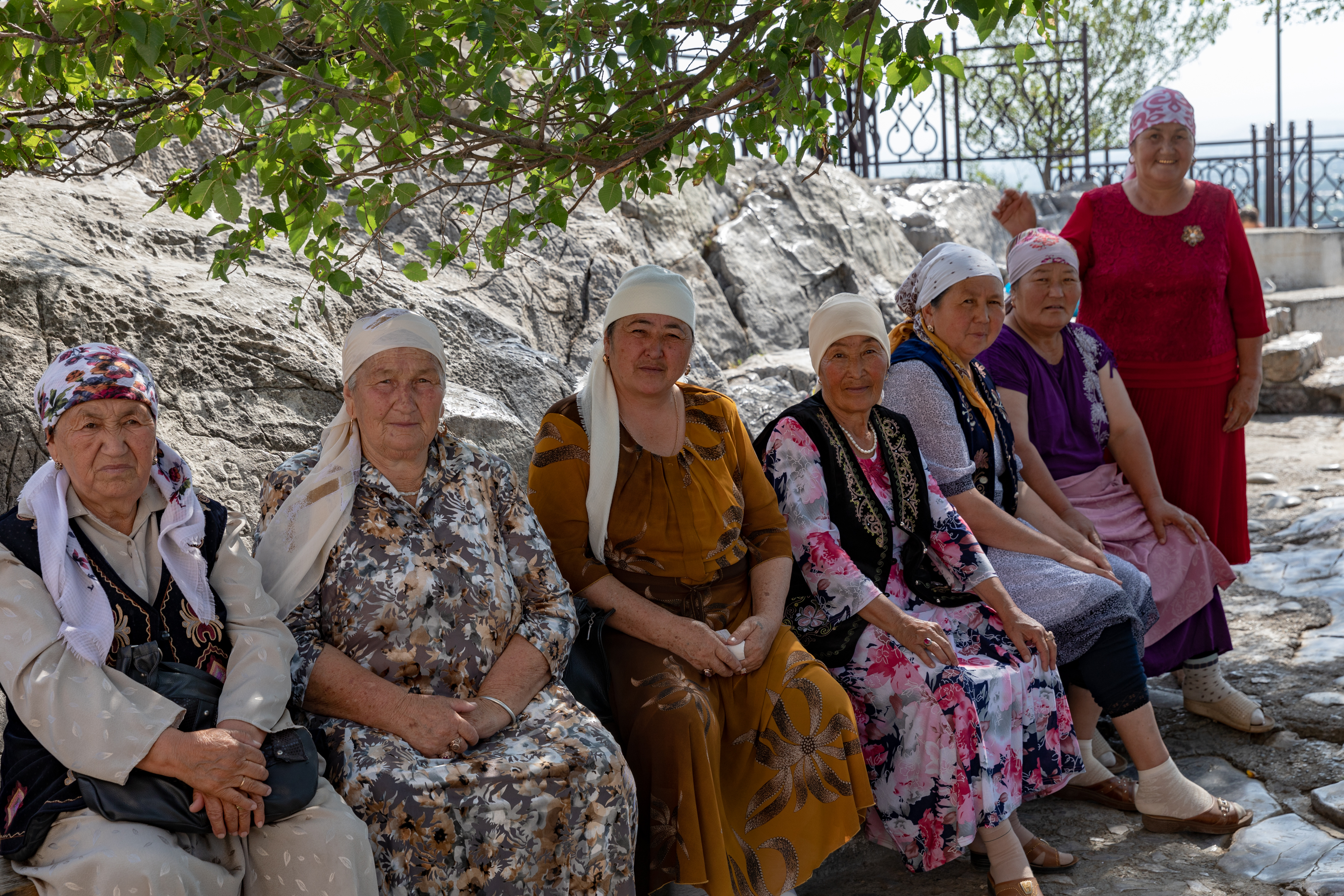
Kyrgyz women rest while on visit to sacred mountain

== See also ==
- List of World Heritage Sites in Kyrgyzstan
