= Maes Titianus =

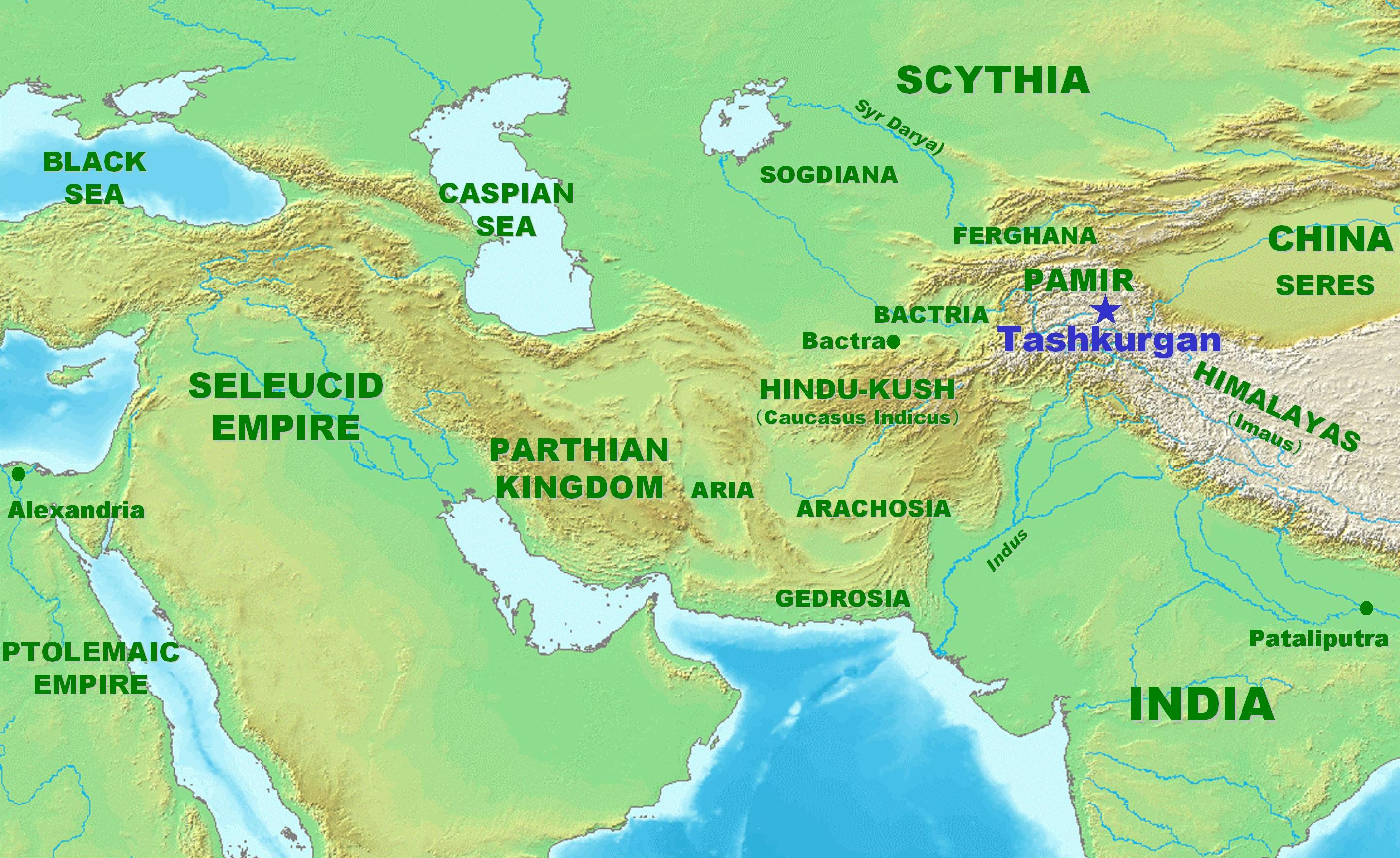
Maes Titianus went as far as Tashkurgan in the Pamir (in blue).

Maës Titianus (fl. c. 100 AD) was an ancient Roman traveller of Macedonian culture. He was a Greek speaker who came from a family of merchants who had both Syrian and Roman identity. Maës sent an expedition that is recorded as having travelled farthest along the Silk Road from the Mediterranean world. In the early 2nd century CE or at the end of the 1st century BC, during a lull in the intermittent Roman struggles with Parthia, his party reached the famous Stone Tower, somewhere in or around the Pamir Mountains close to the border with China. Nothing is known of him, apart from a brief credit in Ptolemy's Geography, 1.11.7, whose knowledge of Maës was gained through an intermediary source, Marinus of Tyre:

"Marinus tells us that a certain Macedonian named Maen, who was also called Titian, son of a merchant father, and a merchant himself, noted the length of this journey [to the Stone Tower], although he did not come to Sera in person but sent other there"

— Claudius Ptolemy, I-XI

The identification of Maës' expedition with any particular Chinese diplomatic mission remains uncertain. Historians Ann Kolb and Michael Speidel note that whether the journey was recorded in Chinese historical accounts is a matter of speculation, and distinguish the expedition described by Ptolemy from the documented mission of Gan Ying in 97 CE. When Maes' expedition reached the Pamirs, the Chinese general Ban Chao of the Han Empire intercepted the group and ensured they were taken eastward to the Chinese capital Luoyang. They were brought before the Han Emperor He. The travellers spoke Greek and were with Parthian merchants and so did not identify themselves as Roman. Thus, the Chinese did not realise they were dealing with subjects of Da Qin (the Roman Empire). Chinese records written in the Hou Hanshu state that the encounter took place in AD 100. (However, p.36, states that "Whether the journey was noted in Chinese historical accounts remains a matter of speculation.") As was standard protocol the Maes merchants offered tribute to Emperor He by giving rewoven Syrian silks and imperial gold coins that bore the image of Emperor Trajan. They were given Han silks as diplomatic gifts and then sent back on their long way back to Syria. It would take them 12 months to return home, totalling two years for the whole round-trip. When they returned, knowledge of their experience spread around the Roman world and for the first time Romans in Egypt and Syria knew of a superpower in the Far East that produced large quantities of silk and steel. Maes Titianus wrote a full account of the journey taken by his merchants but only a brief summary of his work survives in the writings of Claudius Ptolemy.

However, a brief article by Max Cary teased apart some probabilities, notably that the purpose of the expedition was to organize the import of Chinese silk by controlling or eliminating some of the middlemen through whom trade goods were passed, among whom the least dependable were the Parthians. The Stone Tower was located in Xinjiang, the westernmost province over which the Chinese periodically attempted control. The incursion of the nomadic Kushan ca 50 AD blocked Chinese access to the West, but conditions improved ca. 75; consequently the window in which, Cary suggests, Maës found his opportunity lay either before or after the Kushan irruption. At the western end of the trade route, Parthian cooperation could be expected only after the termination of their war with Trajan, 117 CE, too late for Marinus to incorporate the new information, at the close of their war with Nero, 65 CE, during the Kushan interruption, or, the date Cary offers for consideration, after their settlement with Augustus, 20 BCE.

The Maesii Titianii were a family documented in Italy and Sicily, ca. 150-210, and Cary considers the possibility that the governor of Roman Syria from ca 13 BCE, M. Titius, who had been consul suffectus in 31 BCE, and through whose hands the Parthian princes passed to Rome for their education, acted in some way as a patron to the enterprise (Cary 1956:132-34), thus dating the expedition to the time of his governorship.

== See also ==
- Sino-Roman relations
