= List of World Heritage Sites in Kyrgyzstan =

Location of UNESCO World Heritage Sites in Kyrgyzstan. Blue dots are the Silk Road sites. Green dots are the sites of Western Tien-Shan.

The United Nations Educational, Scientific and Cultural Organization (UNESCO) designates World Heritage Sites of outstanding universal value to cultural or natural heritage which have been nominated by countries which are signatories to the UNESCO World Heritage Convention, established in 1972. Cultural heritage consists of monuments (such as architectural works, monumental sculptures, or inscriptions), groups of buildings, and sites (including archaeological sites). Natural heritage consists of natural features (physical and biological formations), geological and physiographical formations (including habitats of threatened species of animals and plants), and natural sites which are important from the point of view of science, conservation, or natural beauty. Kyrgyzstan ratified the convention on 3 July 1995.

Kyrgyzstan has three sites on the list. The first site, the Sulayman Mountain, was listed in 2009. The Silk Road corridors were listed in 2014 and the most recent site, the Western Tien-Shan, was listed in 2016. The Sulayman Mountain and the Silk Roads are cultural sites, while the Western Tien-Shan is a natural site. The Silk Roads site is shared with China and Kazakhstan while the Western Tien-Shan is shared with Kazakhstan and Uzbekistan. In addition, Kyrgyzstan has three sites on the tentative list.

== World Heritage Sites ==
UNESCO lists sites under ten criteria; each entry must meet at least one of the criteria. Criteria i through vi are cultural, and vii through x are natural.

* Transnational site

World Heritage Sites
Site	Image	Location (region)	Year listed	UNESCO data	Description
Sulaiman-Too Sacred Mountain	A mountain above a forest, a museum building at the side of the mountain	Osh	2009	1230rev; ii, vi (cultural)	Located above the Fergana Valley on an important crossroads of the Silk Road, the Sulaiman-Too has been venerated as a sacred mountain in the pre-Islamic and Islamic times. There are numerous cult places on the slopes, including caves with petroglyphs that depict humans, animals, and geometric patterns. There are also two 16th-century mosques.
Silk Roads: the Routes Network of Chang'an-Tianshan Corridor*	A brick minaret with missing top	Chüy	2014	1442; ii, iii, v, vi (cultural)	The Silk Roads are an ancient network of trade routes that started forming in the 2nd century BCE and remained active until the 16th century. The roads connected societies of Asia, the Subcontinent, Central Asia, Western Asia, and the Near East. In addition to exchange of goods, they also contributed to the spread of technologies, ideologies, and religions, including Buddhism, Nestorian Christianity, Manichaeism, Zoroastrianism and early Islam. Several towns and supporting infrastructure have been constructed along the routes. This World Heritage site covers the corridors from Chang’an/Luoyang, the Han and Tang capitals of China, to the Zhetysu region of Central Asia, and is shared with China and Kazakhstan. Three properties in Kyrgyzstan are listed, the Burana Tower in Balasagun is pictured.
Western Tien-Shan*	Mountain scenery with a lake	Jalal-Abad	2016	1490; x (natural)	The property, shared with Kazakhstan and Uzbekistan, covers the western part of the Tian Shan mountain range. It is rich in biodiversity and a number of cultivated fruit crops originate from the area. Mountain peaks reach above 4,500 metres (14,800 ft). Four properties in Kyrgyzstan are listed, Sary-Chelek Nature Reserve is pictured.

== Tentative list ==
In addition to sites inscribed on the World Heritage List, member states can maintain a list of tentative sites that they may consider for nomination. Nominations for the World Heritage List are only accepted if the site was previously listed on the tentative list. Kyrgyzstan has three properties on its tentative list.

Tentative sites
Site	Image	Location (region)	Year listed	UNESCO criteria	Description
Saimaly-Tash Petroglyphs	Stones with petroglyphs	Jalal-Abad	2001	iii, iv, vi (natural)	The petroglyph site is located high in the Fergana Range. Over ten thousand stones with petroglyphs have been found so far, making it one of the richest sites of rock art worldwide. The earliest were created during the third millennium BCE. Saymaluu-Tash has been used as a sacred site at least until the Middle Ages. The petroglyphs provide inside into life and spiritual practices of people of Central Asia.
Silk Roads Sites in Kyrgyzstan	A brick mausoleum in Central Asian style	several sites	2001	ii, iii, iv, v, vi (natural)	This nomination comprises six properties related to the Silk Road corridors in Kyrgyzstan. The sites in the Chüy Valley are already listed as a component of a World Heritage Site. Two main corridors were used. The road through the Fergana Valley was used during the Han Dynasty and Zhang Qian wrote about it in the 2nd century BCE. The route via the Bedel Pass and along the southern shore of the Issyk-Kul lake became popular in the early Middle Ages because of unrest in Fergana. A mausoleum in Özgön, dating to the 11th and 12th centuries, is pictured.
Silk Roads: Fergana-Syr Darya Corridor*		several sites	2025	ii, iii, v (cultural)	This nomination covers the corridor of the Silk Road from the Fergana Valley to Syr Darya river and is shared with Kazakhstan, Tajikistan, and Uzbekistan. It overlaps with the 2001 nomination above.

== See also ==
- List of Intangible Cultural Heritage elements in Kyrgyzstan
