= Tourism in Kyrgyzstan =

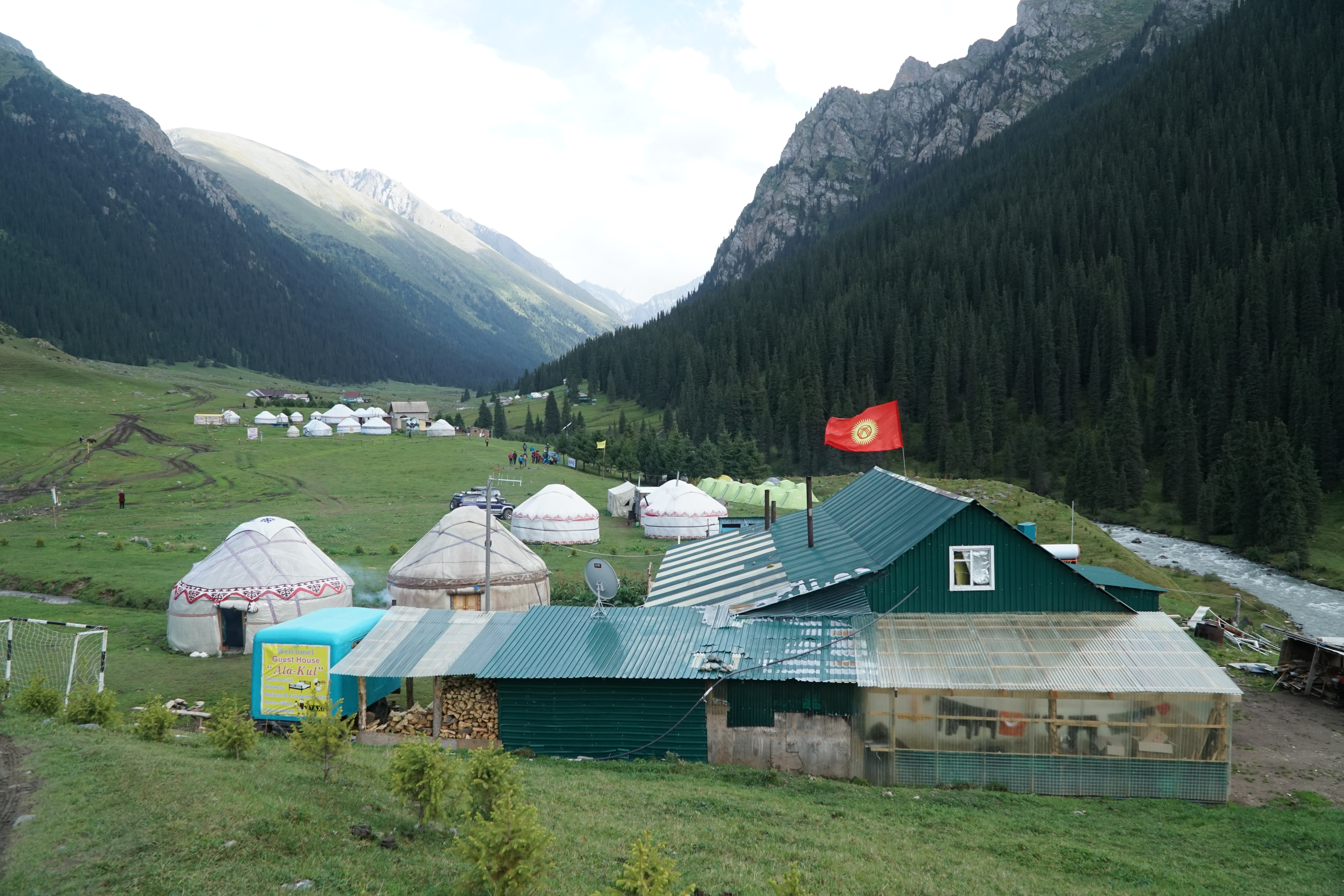
Yurts and a tourist resort in Altyn Arashan

Although Kyrgyzstan’s mountains and lakes are attractive tourist destinations, the tourism industry has grown very slowly because it has received little investment. In the early 2000s, an average of about 450,000 tourists visited annually, mainly from countries of the former Soviet Union. In 2018, the British Backpacker Society ranked Kyrgyzstan as the fifth best adventure travel destination on earth, stating that the country was an adventure travel secret that is "bound to get out soon."

Lake Issyk-Kul and the Tian Shan mountains are relatively popular tourist destinations.

== Cultural attractions ==
Kyrgyz culture is based on nomadic traditions that harken back to the days of the Mongol hordes. Although modern Kyrgyz people live mainly in houses or apartment buildings, in the summer time it is still possible to observe the native people living in a yurt with their herds of sheep, goats, horses, and occasionally even yaks. There are a number of yurt camps that cater to tourists in every oblast; some of the most notable (and remote) are in Tash Rabat, the "House of Stones" in Naryn oblast past Naryn City, and in Jeti-Ögüz ("Seven Bulls") Valley in Jeti-Ögüz District near the city of Karakol on Lake Issyk-Kul.

Kyrgyz women produce a variety of handicrafts created out of felt, including slippers, bags, decorative panels, traditional hats known as "Kalpaks" and colorful carpets called "shyrdaks." These carpets are made in a variety of sizes, from foot-by-foot sized to several yards in length. Shyrdaks come in a wide variety of traditional patterns; the Kyrgyz favor brightly colored ones, often combining bright red and green. More subtly-hued shyrdaks, made for foreign customers, can be found in Bishkek, often for a slightly higher price than the more "traditional" carpets. Naryn oblast is widely considered the home of the best shyrdak makers in the country; there are several cooperatives there where it is possible to commission a work specially.

== Eco-tourism ==
Currently there are several efforts to promote "eco-friendly" tourism in Kyrgyzstan. Helvetas, a Swiss cultural development organization, sponsored several projects of this sort, including "Shepard's Life," and "Community Based Tourism." The many tourist companies in Kyrgyzstan understand that "eco-" anything sounds very appealing to the many backpackers that come to their country, so they tend to use it to describe their organization, even if they do nothing to promote "low-impact" or "leave no trace" camping. However, the very nature of the type of tourists that are attracted to Kyrgyzstan dictates that most of the tourist attractions offered are aimed at enjoying the beauty that the local environment has to offer. In year 2010 Kyrgyzstan joined The Region Initiative (TRI) which is a Tri-regional Umbrella of Tourism related organisations. TRI is functioning as a link between three regions----South Asia, Central Asia and Eastern Europe which is also joined by Armenia, Bangladesh, India, Georgia, Kazakhstan, India, Pakistan, Nepal, Tajikistan, Russia, Sri Lanka, Turkey, Ukraine and Uzbekistan.

== Tourist sites ==
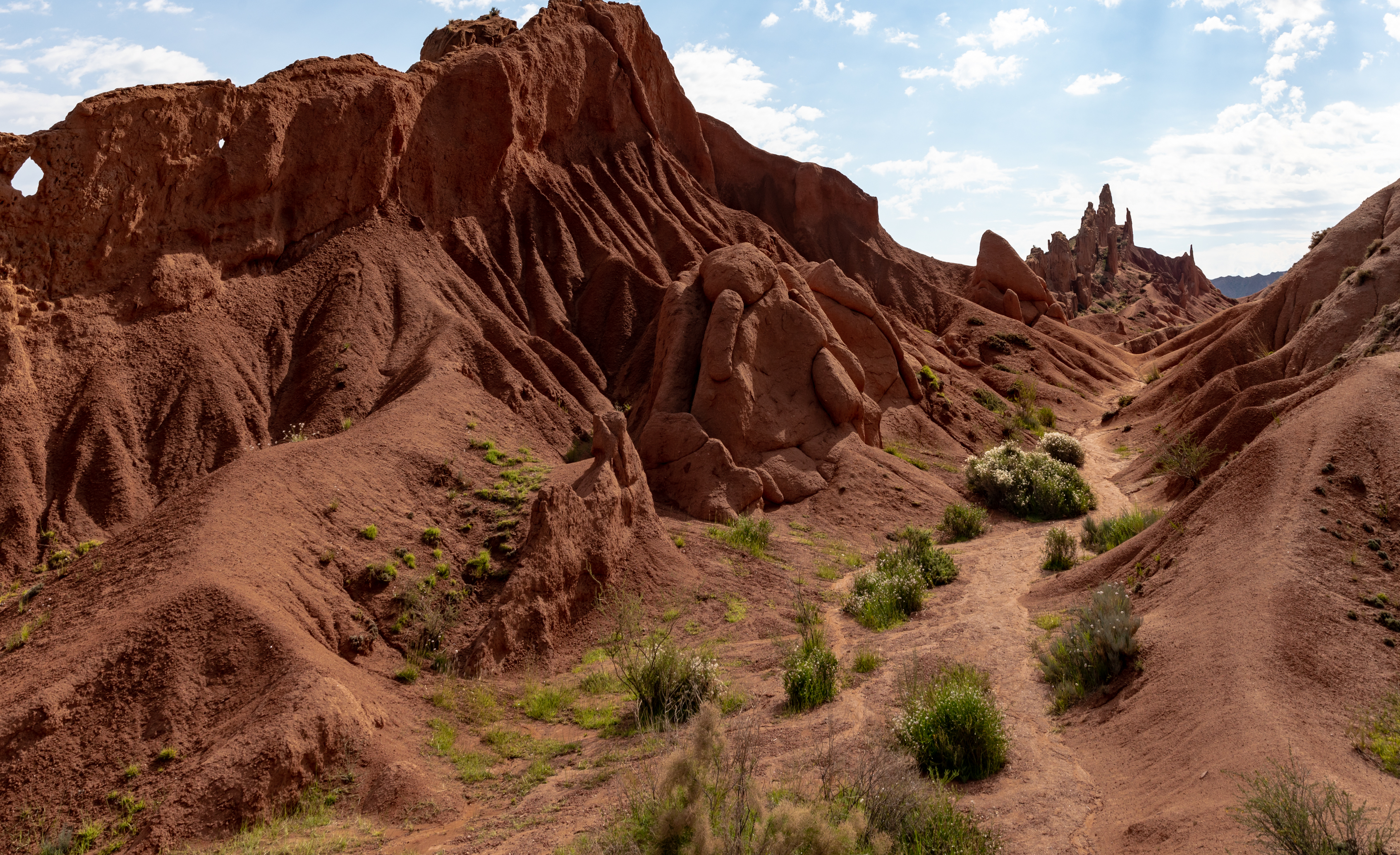
Skazka Canyon, Kyrgyzstan

The popular science magazine National Geographic named eight wild places in Kyrgyzstan that are recommended for tourists to visit. “In the cities of Kyrgyzstan there are many Soviet-style buildings, spacious markets and colorful mosques. However, outside of Bishkek and Osh you will see a miracle - high-mountain lakes, snow-capped peaks and walnut forests,” the publication writes. National Geographic has included several locations in its selection.

- Ala Archa National Park - It is located 40 kilometers from Bishkek. One of the most famous natural areas in the country. From the Kyrgyz language, "ala-archa" is translated as "motley juniper" - this plant is used by the local population to protect housing from evil spirits.
- Köl-Suu - In the highlands near the border with China there is a lake. To get there, you need four hours by car from Naryn, and then get on foot or on horseback.
- Lenin Peak - Located on the border with Tajikistan. This seven-thousander is one of the most famous peaks in Kyrgyzstan. Experienced climbers try to conquer it every year.
- Arslanbob - One of the largest walnut forests in the world. First interested settlers in the III century BC, and today attracts tourists from different countries.
- Ala-Kul - Located in the snowy mountain range of Teskey Ala-Too at an altitude of 3532 meters. You can get there only on foot - it will take more than one day.
- Tash Rabat - At one time, this historic building served as the main parking lot for merchants and caravans following the Great Silk Road. A caravanserai was built in a valley between the mountains of At-Bashi. Today, tourists can get here for a small fee. Nearby there are hiking trails leading to the lake and Chatyr-Kul Nature Reserve.
- Skazka Canyon - Also known as Fairytale Canyon, and jn Kyrgyz "Жомок капчыгайы (Zhomok Kapchyghayi)", this area is on the southern shore of Lake Issyk-Kul. The canyon was formed as a result of thousands of years of ice, water and wind erosion.
- Bokonbaevo - A small village on the coast of Issyk-Kul attracts tourists with preserved traditions. Here they will be shown hunting games with hunting birds or offered to ride a horse.

== Visitor statistics ==
The number of tourists recorded in Kyrgyzstan's official tourism statistics increased substantially following the decline associated with the COVID-19 pandemic. According to the National Statistical Committee of the Kyrgyz Republic, the number rose from 463,900 in 2020 to 3,658,500 in 2024.

Broader estimates based on border-crossing and international visitor-arrival data can be considerably higher. Such figures may include business travel, private visits, short cross-border journeys and repeated entries, and are therefore not directly comparable with the narrower official tourism figures.

Country	2017	2016	2015	2014
Kazakhstan	1,833,900	1,787,100	1,989,200	1,998,500
Russia	471,400	431,000	528,700	447,700
Tajikistan	250,900	169,500	117,600	79,300
Uzbekistan	479,600	150,700	60,900	125,900
Ukraine	9,200	141,300	133,600	5,800
Turkey	54,300	36,800	36,100	33,000
China	39,500	36,600	35,800	29,900
United States	14,200	13,900	19,200	14,300
India	19,600	11,400	7,600	4,200
Germany	13,100	11,100	16,700	15,200
South Korea	13,100	10,300	7,000	10,500
Turkmenistan	800	8,500	5,900	8,600
Azerbaijan	8,500	8,100	5,300	3,700
United Kingdom	6,900	6,600	6,900	4,400
Georgia	5,700	5,700	2,500	1,800
Total	3,219,700	2,930,200	3,050,600	2,849,400

== See also ==
- Visa policy of Kyrgyzstan
- Cuisine of Kyrgyzstan
