= Joseph Hager =

Joseph Hager (Milan, 30 April 1757 – Milan, 27 June 1819) was an Austrian linguist, lexicographer, orientalist, writer and academic naturalized Italian.

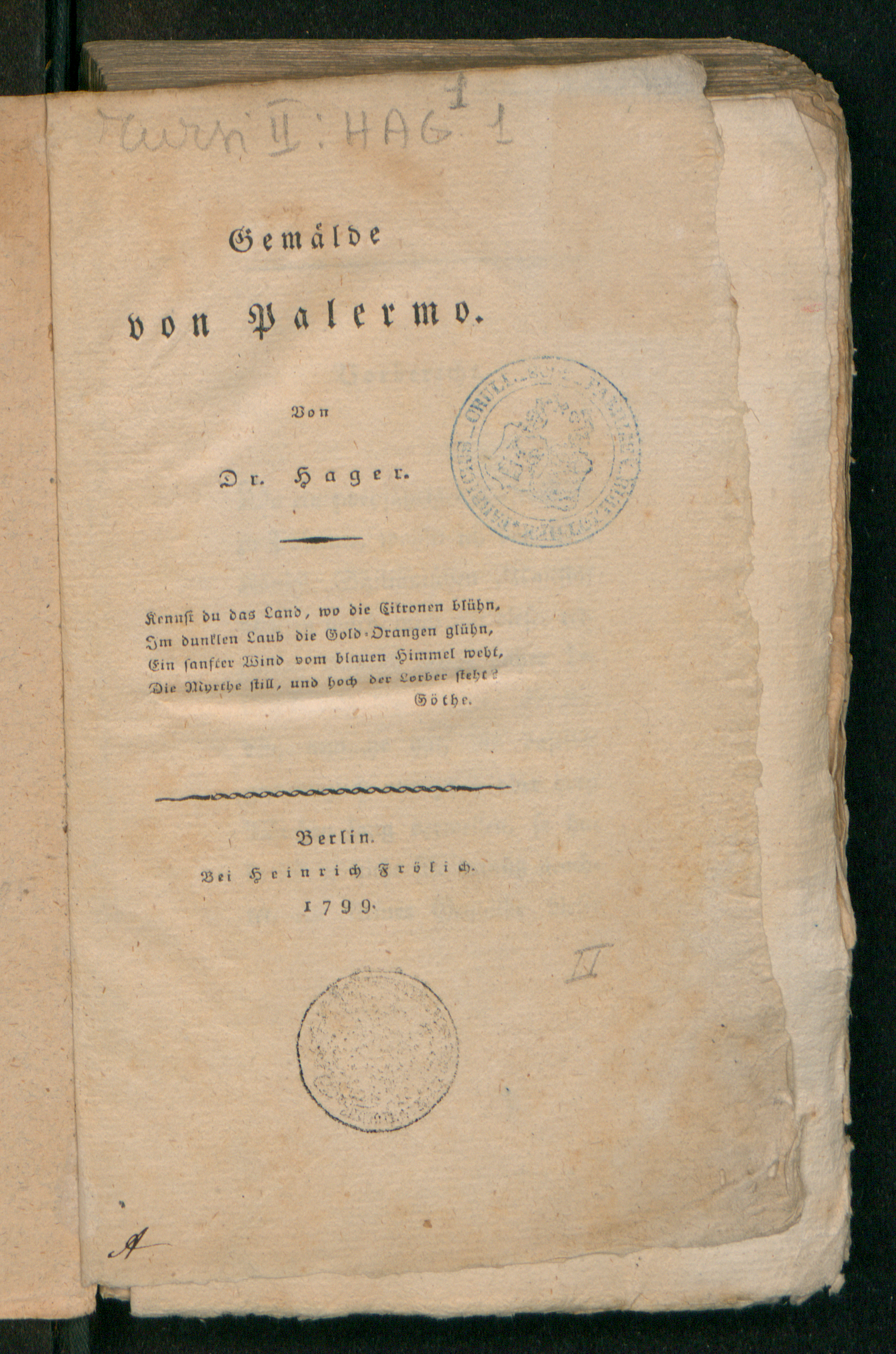
Gemälde von Palermo, 1799

== Biography ==
He was born in Milan to Giuseppe and Marianna Tyher from a family of Viennese origin. At the age of ten he was sent to Vienna to study Oriental languages at the K.k. Akademie für Orientalische Sprachen, founded in 1754 to prepare diplomatic personnel to be sent to the East. He became professor of Arabic language at the University of Vienna.

He then continued his studies at the University of Pavia where, in 1783, he obtained a doctorate in Theology, joining the Friars Minor Reformers and moving to Rome at the Congregation for the Evangelization of Peoples, where he began to interest and study the Chinese language.

In 1788 he was called to settle the dispute over some documents forged by the monk and scholar Giuseppe Vella. From his travels in Sicily, drew the work Gemälde von Palermo.

There followed an intense period of his life where he traveled moving between Leipzig, Hamburg and Berlin. He published in London the first dictionary of Chinese in 1800: Proposal for publishing by subscription ..., a dictionary of Chinese language and then his most important work on the Chinese language: An explanation of the elementary characters of the Chinese.

In 1806 he returned to Italy, to Pavia where he was appointed professor of Chinese and Oriental languages, until 1809 when, with the new regulations of the Kingdom of Italy, the teaching of Oriental languages was suppressed throughout the Italian territory. The following year he was appointed by the Biblioteca di Brera as sub-librarian. In 1815 he returned to teach at the University of Pavia in the Faculty of Oriental Languages.

== Works ==
Some of his writings include:

- Schreiben aus Wien an Herrn Pallas. Vienna. 1789.
- Neue Beweise der Verwandtschaft der Ungarn mit den Lappländern. 1793–1794.
- Reise von Wien nach Madrid. Berlino. 1792.
- Skizze einer Reise nach Berlin. Vienna. 1792.
- Reise von Warschau über Wien nach der Hauptstadt von Sicilien. Lipsia. 1795.
- Gemälde von Palermo. Berlino. 1799.
- Nachricht von einer merkwürdigen literarischen Betrügerei. Lipsia. 1799.
- Proposal for publishing by subscription..., a dictionary of Chinese language. 1800.
- Memoria sulla bussola orientale. Pavia. 1810.
- Memoria sulle cifre arabiche attribuite fin ai nostri giorni agli Indiani, ma inventate in un paese più remoto dell'India. Milano. 1813.
- ΛίθινοϚ ΠύργοϚ, ossia Forte di pietra...situato secondo i geografi greci... nella Scizia, e scoperto a' giorni nostri. Milano. 1816.
- Iscrizioni cinesi di Quàng-ceu, ossia della città chiamata volgarmente dagli europei Canton. Milano. 1816.
- Observations sur la ressemblance frappante qu'on découvre entre la langue des Russes et celle des Romains=città=Milano. 1817.
- Spiegazione di due rarissime medaglie cufiche della famiglia degli Ommiadi appartenenti al Museo Mainoni in Milano. Milano. 1818.

== Bibliography ==
- Hager, Josef (1799). Gemälde von Palermo. Berlin: Heinrich Fröhlich.
- Marica Roda, HAGER, Giuseppe, in Dizionario biografico degli italiani, LXI volume, Roma, Istituto dell'Enciclopedia Italiana, 2004. URL consultato il 25 luglio 2016.
