= Darkan =

Darkan may refer to:

- Darkan, Western Australia
- Darkan, Iran (disambiguation)
- Darkan, Kyrgyzstan, a village in Issyk-Kul Region
