= Barskoon Waterfall =

- IUCN category III (natural monument or feature)
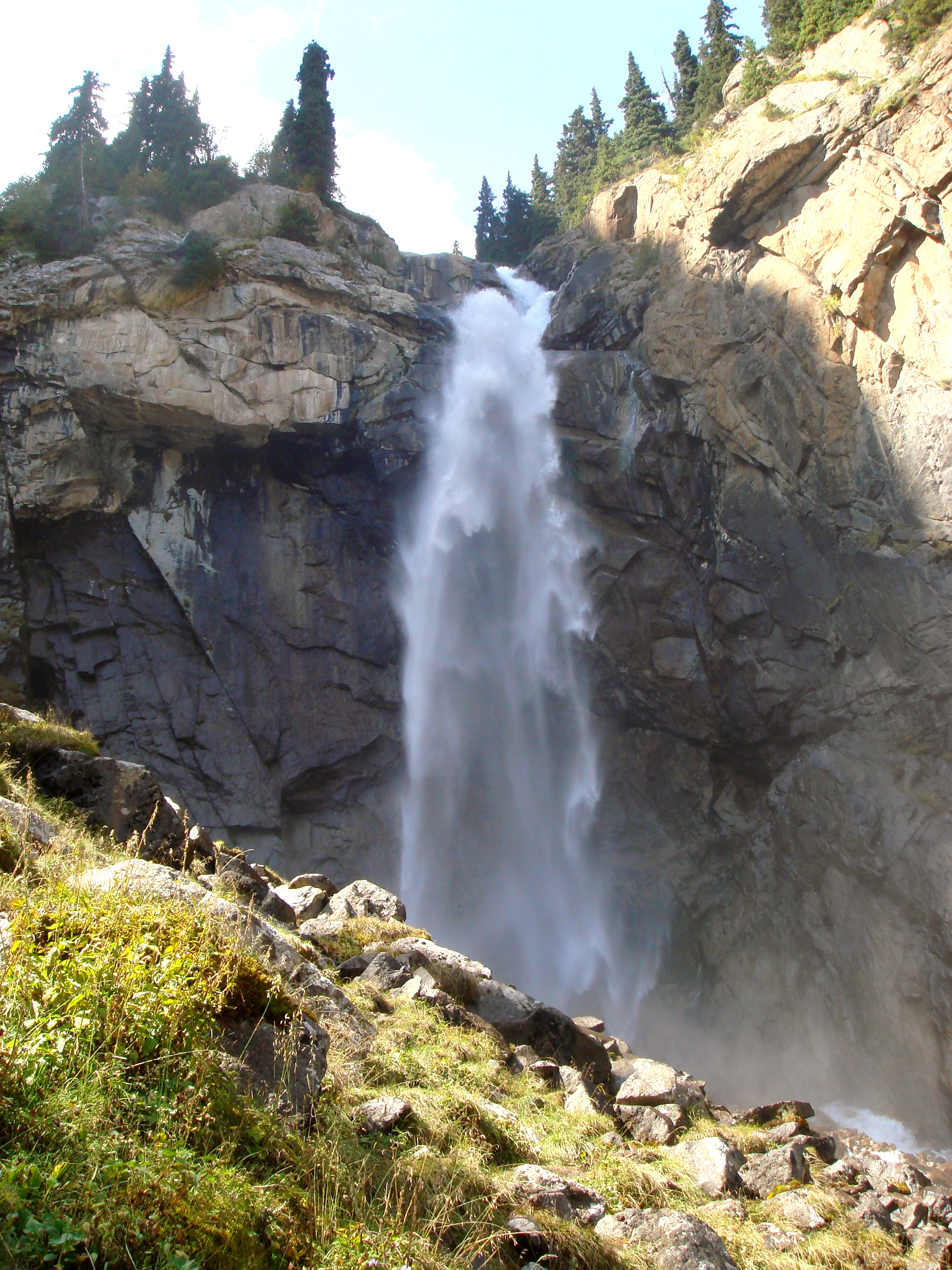
- Barskoon Waterfall

- Location within Kyrgyzstan
- Location: Kyrgyzstan
- Coordinates: 42°00′07″N 77°34′37″E
- Established: 1975

Barskoon Waterfall (Kyrgyz: Барскоон шаркыратмасы, Russian: Водопад Барскаун) is a geological protected area located in Jeti-Ögüz District of Issyk-Kul Region of Kyrgyzstan. It sits 90 km to the south-west of Karakol on one of the tributaries of the river Barskoon. There are several waterfalls at the site, which is located 20 km south of the village of Barskoon. The height of the main cascade is 24 metres (79 ft). National Monument status was established in 1975.

According to one legend, the waterfall was created from the tears of a female leopard who cried over the injured cubs that fell off a cliff.

On the way to Barskoon, two monuments were erected. One is a Soviet truck on a wide pedestal, and the other is a bust of Yuri Gagarin.

== See also ==
- List of waterfalls
