= Kyzyl-Suu =

Village in Kyrgyzstan

Kyzyl-Suu Кызыл-Суу
- Village
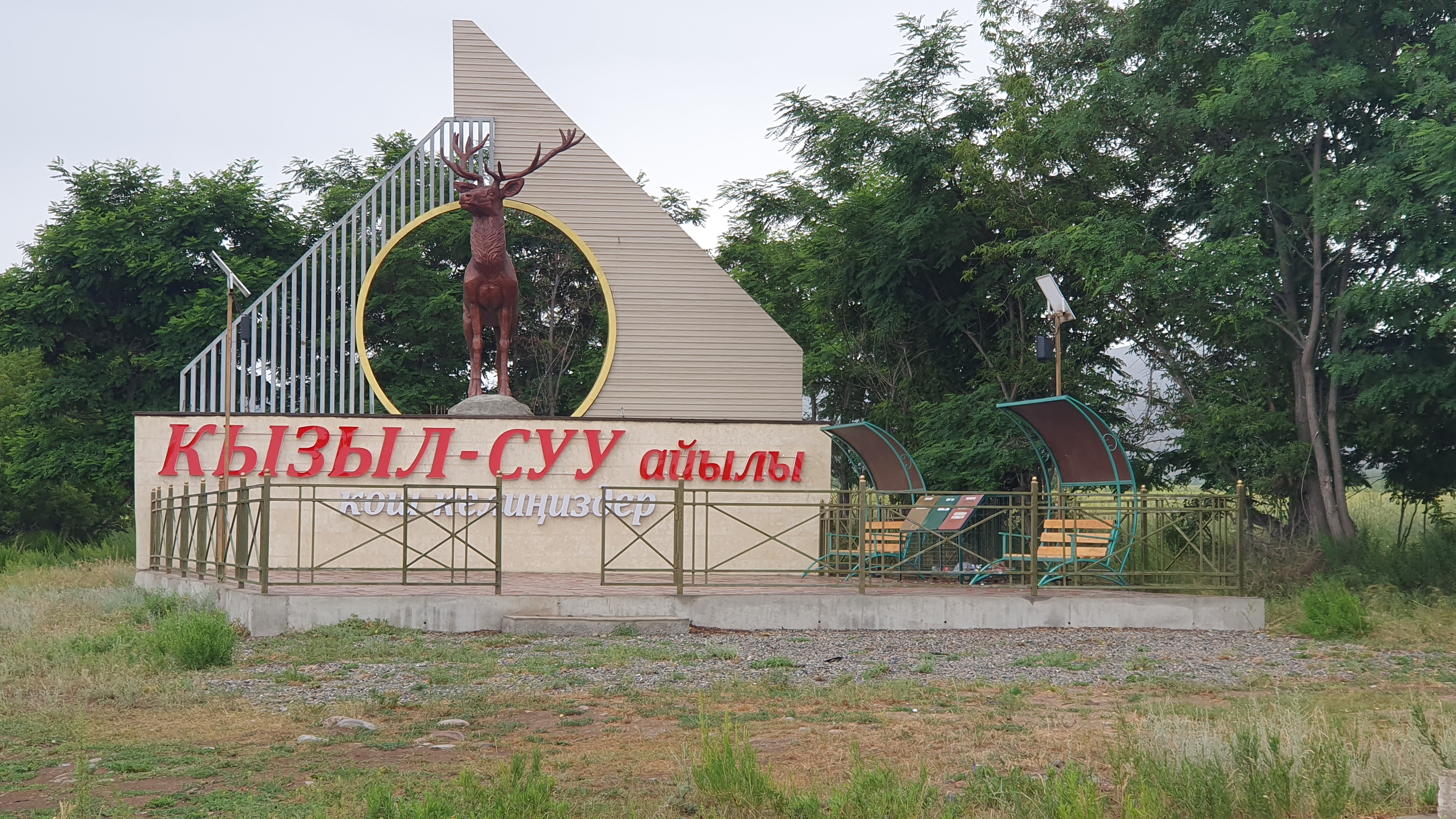

- Location within Kyrgyzstan
- Coordinates: 42°20′33″N 78°00′17″E
- Country: Kyrgyzstan
- Region: Issyk-Kul Region
- District: Jeti-Ögüz District
- Elevation: 1,770 m (5,810 ft)

Population (2023)
  - Total: 15,464
- Time zone: UTC+6
- Postal code: 722000

Kyzyl-Suu (Kyrgyz: Кызыл-Суу, formerly known as Pokrovka) is a village in the Issyk-Kul Region of Kyrgyzstan. About 10km inland from Lake Issyk Kul on the A363 highway between Jeti-Ögüz resort and Barskoon, it is the capital of Jeti-Ögüz District. Its population was 15,075 in 2021.

At the head of the Chong Kyzyl-Suu ('little red water') valley, it is a base for trekking into the 14,000 foot mountains to the south.

== Etymology ==
Kyzyl-Suu is named for the "Kyzyl-Suu" river that runs through it. Kyzyl-Suu literally translates to "red water", in reference to the red clay which stains the water during periods of heavy rain. The name is similar to that of the Kizilsu Kyrgyz Autonomous Prefecture, Xinjiang, China.

== Population ==
Historical population
| Year | Pop. | ±% p.a. |
|---|---|---|
| 1990 | 13,493 | — |
| 2009 | 12,150 | −0.55% |
| 2021 | 15,075 | +1.81% |
Note: resident population; Sources:

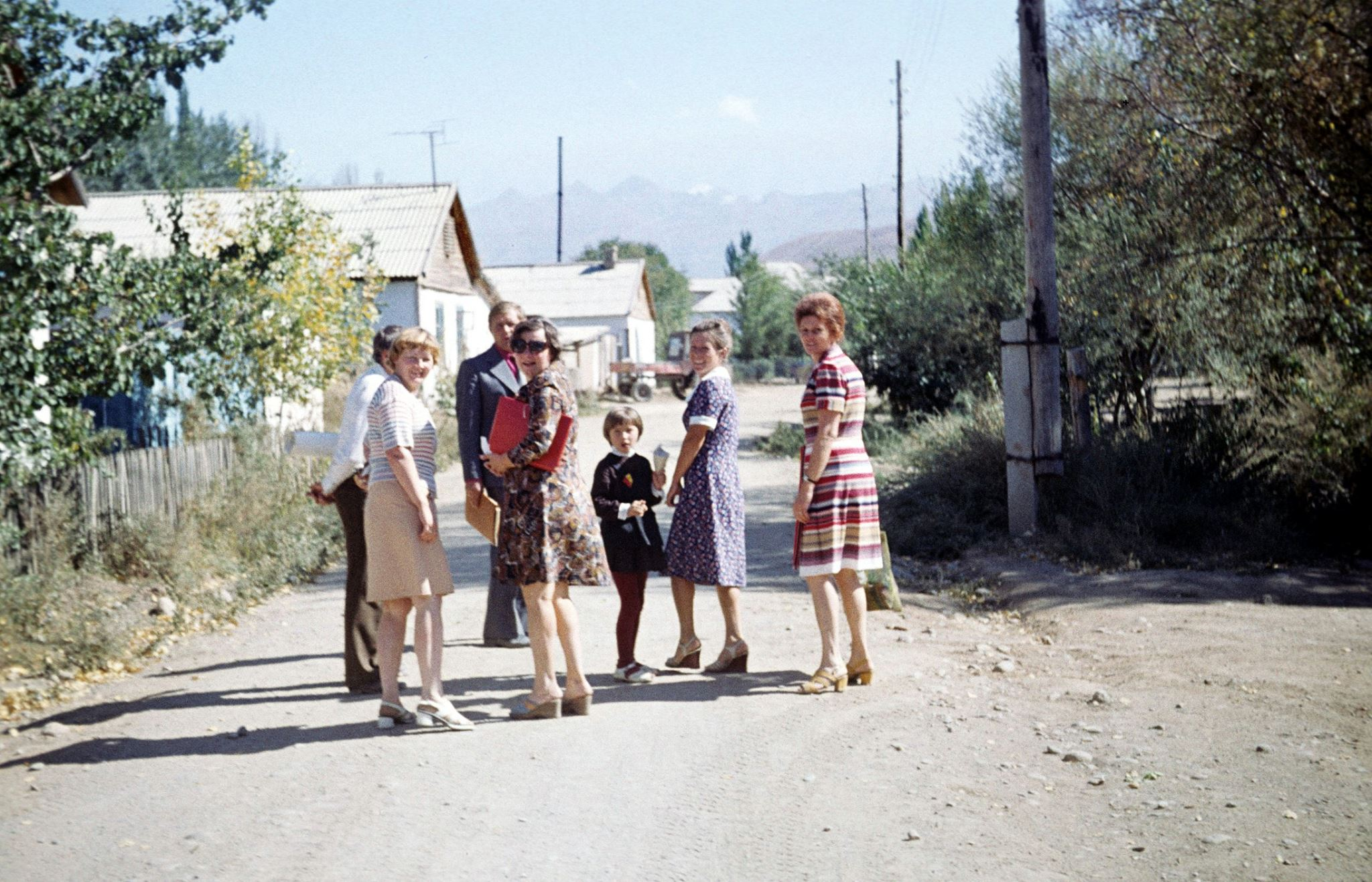
Pokrovka, 1978. Kyzyl-Suu's former name is Pokrovka.

== History ==
In 1869, a peasant from Tambovsky Uyezd named Slivkin built a farmstead on the left bank of the Chong-Kyzyl-Suu River along the main road, laying the foundation for the future settlement. The village was officially established in 1873. Its original name was Slivkino, and since 1875 it has been known as Pokrovka.

The settlers cultivated grain crops, kept cattle and horses, and practiced beekeeping. Most of their livestock was grazed by the surrounding Kyrgyz, from whom they leased pastureland. By 1909, the village included 40 landless settler families. Lease agreements followed a sharecropping arrangement: the settler peasants carried out plowing and provided seeds, while the Kyrgyz were responsible for irrigation.

Following the establishment of the village, the local Kyrgyz nomadic population gradually began transitioning to a sedentary way of life.
