= Seok =

Seok may refer to:

- Seok (clan), clan among the Turkic-speaking people
- Seok (Korean name), Korean surname and given names
- Seok Pass, a mountain pass in Kyrgyzstan
