= Ak-Terek =

Ak-Terek (meaning "White poplar") may refer to the following places in Kyrgyzstan:

- Ak-Terek, Batken, a village in the Leylek District, Batken Region
- Ak-Terek, Issyk-Kul, a village in the Jeti-Ögüz District, Issyk-Kul Region
- Ak-Terek, Bazar-Korgon, a village in the Bazar-Korgon District, Jalal-Abad Region
- Ak-Terek, Chatkal, a village in the Chatkal District, Jalal-Abad Region
- Ak-Terek, Suzak, a village in the Suzak District, Jalal-Abad Region
- Ak-Terek, Kara-Suu, a village in the Kara-Suu District, Osh Region
- Ak-Terek, Nookat, a village in the Nookat District, Osh Region
- Ak-Terek, Özgön, a village in the Özgön District, Osh Region
