= Jeti-Ögüz Rocks =

Rock formation in Kyrgyzstan

- IUCN category III (natural monument or feature)
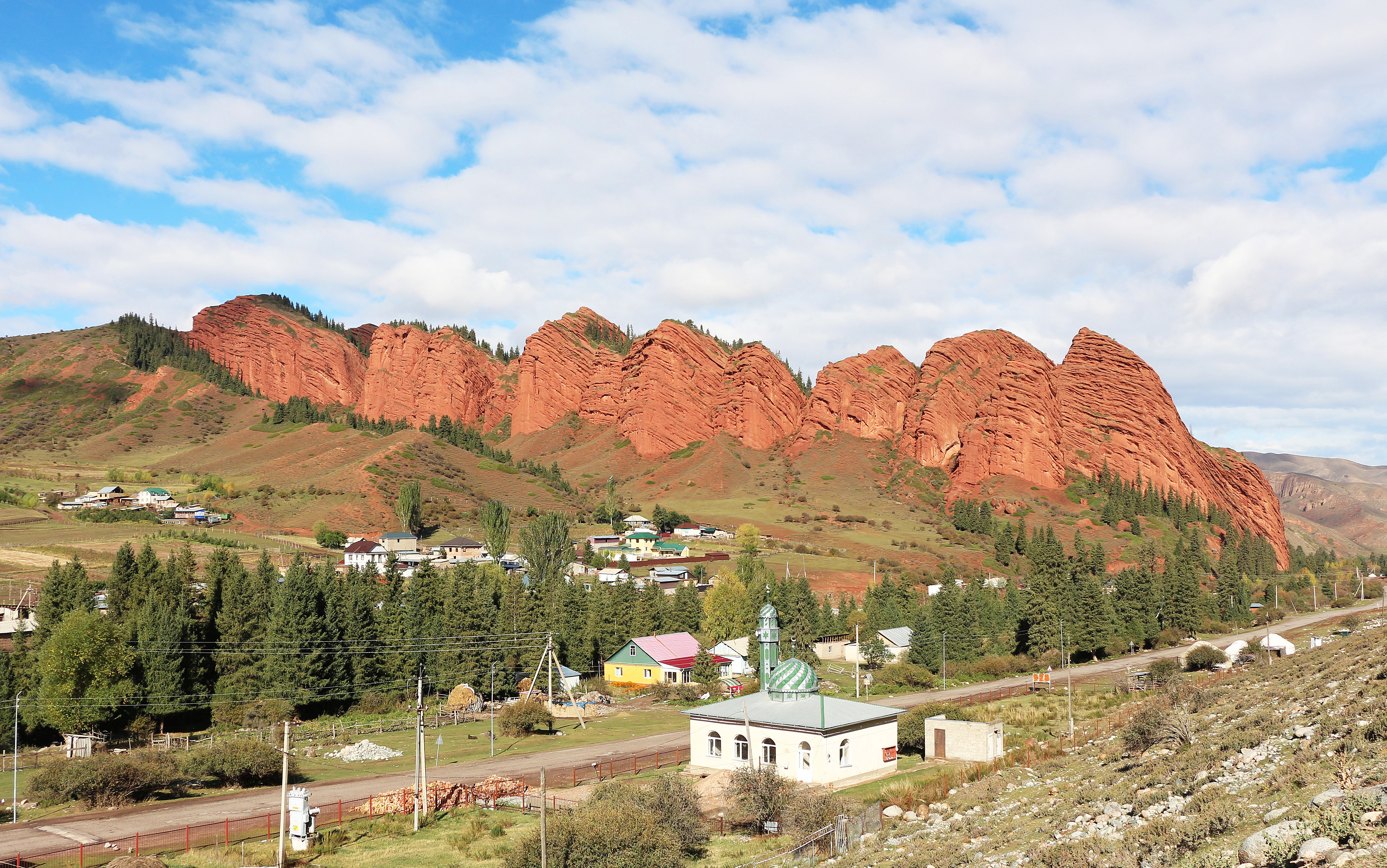
- Seven Bulls rock formation near Jeti-Ögüz

- Location within Kyrgyzstan
- Location: Jeti-Ögüz District, Issyk-Kul Region, Kyrgyzstan
- Nearest city: Karakol
- Coordinates: 42°20′14″N 78°13′51″E
- Established: 1975

The Jeti-Ögüz Rocks is a geological protected area (nature monument) located in Jeti-Ögüz District of Issyk-Kul Region of Kyrgyzstan. It was established in 1975 with a purpose of conservation of a unique geological formation – sheer cliffs composed of Tertiary red conglomerates. The name derives from the rock formation's resemblance to seven bulls and a legend about a khan's unfaithful wife. Another near-by formation is called the 'broken heart'. The rock formation is a well-known landmark in Kyrgyzstan and is seen as a national or regional symbol, and hence is the subject of paintings, songs, and even music videos. The surrounding area is known for its natural environment. The Jeti-Ögüz resort and sanatorium can be found near the foot of the rocks.
