= Lipenka, Kyrgyzstan =

Lipenka Липенка
- village
- Location within Kyrgyzstan
- Coordinates: 42°31′20″N 78°12′09″E
- Country: Kyrgyzstan
- Region: Issyk-Kul Region
- District: Jeti-Ögüz District
- Elevation: 1,656 m (5,433 ft)

Population (2023)
  - Total: 1,803

Lipenka is a village in the Jeti-Ögüz District of Issyk-Kul Region of Kyrgyzstan. Its population was 1,772 in 2021.
