= Juuku =

- Native name: Жууку (Kyrgyz)

Location
- Country: Kyrgyzstan

Physical characteristics
- Source: Teskey Ala-Too Range
  - location: Jeti-Ögüz District
- Mouth: Issyk-Kul
  - coordinates: 42°21′45″N 77°51′59″E
- Length: 63 km (39 mi)
- Basin size: 590 km^{2} (230 sq mi)
- Discharge
  - average: 6.28 m^{3}/s (222 cu ft/s)
  - maximum: 52.2 m^{3}/s (1,840 cu ft/s)

Basin features
- Tributaries
  - left: Tomen Kashka-Suu
  - right: Juukuchak, Ashuu Kashka-Suu, Ittish

The Juuku (Kyrgyz: Жууку) is a river in Jeti-Ögüz District of Issyk-Kul Region of Kyrgyzstan. It rises on north slopes of Teskey Ala-Too Range and flows into lake Issyk-Kul near Saruu. The length of the river is 63 km (39 mi) and the basin area 590 square kilometres (230 mi^{2}). Average annual discharge is 6.28 m^{3}/s (222 cu ft/s). The maximum flow is 52.2 m^{3}/s (1,840 cu ft/s). Three breakthrough-prone moraine-dammed and moraine glacier-dammed lakes, specifically: Chokoly-Kel, Juukuchak, and Juuka Syrty are located in the river basin upstream at altitudes of 3600 m and above posing a risk of floods.
