= Darkan, Kyrgyzstan =

Darkan Даркан
- Location within Kyrgyzstan
- Coordinates: 42°18′40″N 77°53′10″E
- Country: Kyrgyzstan
- Region: Issyk-Kul
- District: Jeti-Ögüz

Population (2023)
  - Total: 7,398
- Time zone: UTC+6

Darkan (Kyrgyz: Даркан) is a village in Issyk-Kul Region of Kyrgyzstan. It is part of the Jeti-Ögüz District. Its population was 7,208 in 2021. It lies near the outflow of the river Juuku into Lake Issyk-Kul.

== Population ==
Historical population
Year	Pop.	±% p.a.
2009	6,495	—
2021	7,208	+0.87%
Note: resident population; Sources:
