= Barskoon (river) =

River in Kyrgyzstan

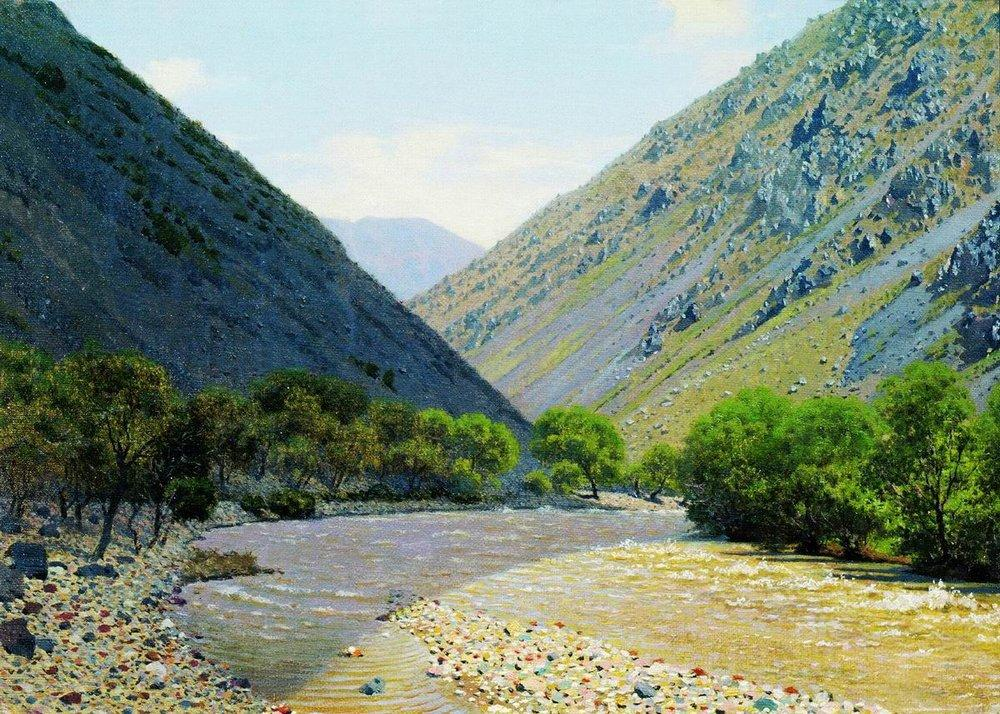
- The Barskoon River in Barskoon Gorge
- Native name: Kyrgyz: Барскон

Location
- Country: Kyrgyzstan
- Region: Issyk-Kul Region
- District: Jeti-Ögüz District

Physical characteristics
- Source: Saralatash Pass, Teskey Ala-Too Range
  - elevation: 3,684 m (12,087 ft)
- Mouth: Issyk-Kul
- Length: 62 km (39 mi)
- Basin size: 352 km^{2} (136 sq mi)
- Discharge
  - average: 4.07 m^{3}/s (144 cu ft/s)
  - minimum: 0.11 m^{3}/s (3.9 cu ft/s)
  - maximum: 55.8 m^{3}/s (1,970 cu ft/s)

Basin features
- River system: Issyk-Kul basin

The Barskoon (Kyrgyz: Барскон) is a river in Jeti-Ögüz District, Issyk-Kul Region, Kyrgyzstan. It originates in the Teskey Ala-Too Range and flows into Issyk-Kul. The river is 62 km (39 mi) long, and its drainage basin covers 352 km^{2} (136 sq mi).

== Course and basin ==
The Barskoon rises at Saralatash Pass, at an elevation of 3,684 m (12,087 ft), in the central part of the Teskey Ala-Too Range. Glaciers cover approximately 10% of its drainage basin, which also contains several waterfalls.

== Tributaries and lakes ==
The river has 49 tributaries with a combined length of approximately 100 km (62 mi). The largest include the Düngürömö, Sharkyrak, At-Jayloo, Jangy-Korgon and Kerege-Tash.

There are nine lakes in the drainage basin, with a combined area of 0.48 km^{2} (0.19 sq mi).

== Hydrology ==
The river is fed mainly by snowmelt and glacier meltwater.

The long-term average discharge of the Barskoon is 4.07 m^{3}/s (144 cu ft/s). Its maximum discharge is 55.8 m^{3}/s (1,970 cu ft/s), while its minimum discharge is 0.11 m^{3}/s (3.9 cu ft/s). The river begins its seasonal rise in May and recedes in September.

== Human use ==
The Barskoon is used for irrigation. The village of Barskoon is situated along the river.

== Natural hazards ==
High-mountain lakes in the Barskoon basin have been identified as potentially prone to outburst flooding, threatening roads, bridges and other infrastructure downstream. The Ministry of Emergency Situations also identifies household plots and concrete irrigation channels beside the river in Barskoon village as exposed to flood and debris-flow hazards.
