= Tilekmat =

Tilekmat Тилекмат Shalba
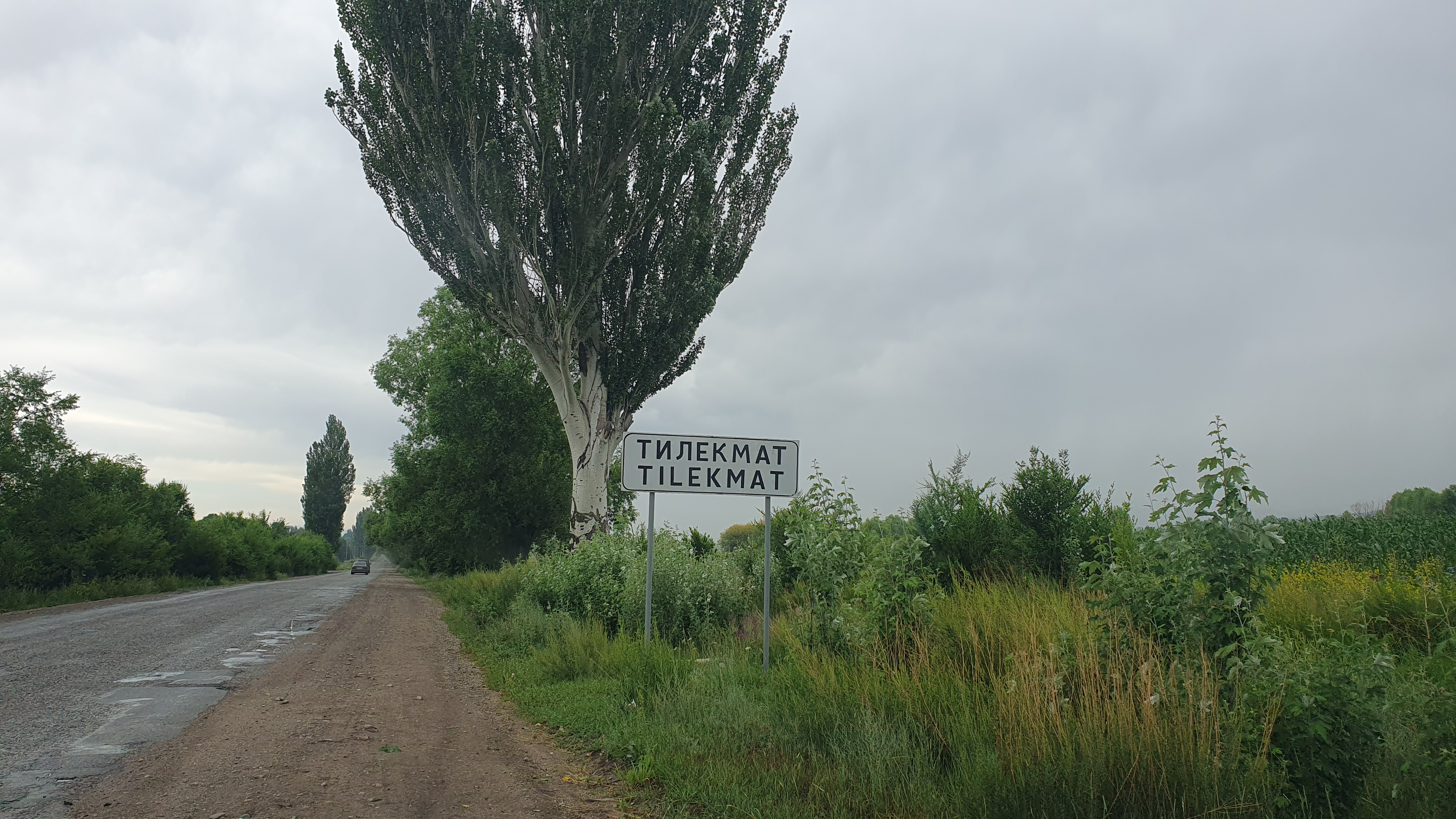

- Location within Kyrgyzstan
- Coordinates: 42°26′01″N 78°09′00″E
- Country: Kyrgyzstan
- Region: Issyk-Kul Region
- District: Jeti-Ögüz District

Population (2023)
  - Total: 3,366
- Time zone: UTC+6

Tilekmat (Kyrgyz: Тилекмат) is a settlement in the Issyk-Kul Region of Kyrgyzstan. It is part of the Jeti-Ögüz District. The settlement was named for Tilekmat Jylkyaydar uulu (Tilekmat Ake), Kyrgyz politician, people's diplomat and talented thinker, who was buried near it. Its population was 3,306 in 2021.

== Population ==
Historical population
Year	Pop.	±% p.a.
2009	2,004	—
2021	3,306	+4.26%
Note: resident population; Sources:
