= Barskoon =

Barskoon Барскоон بارسغان
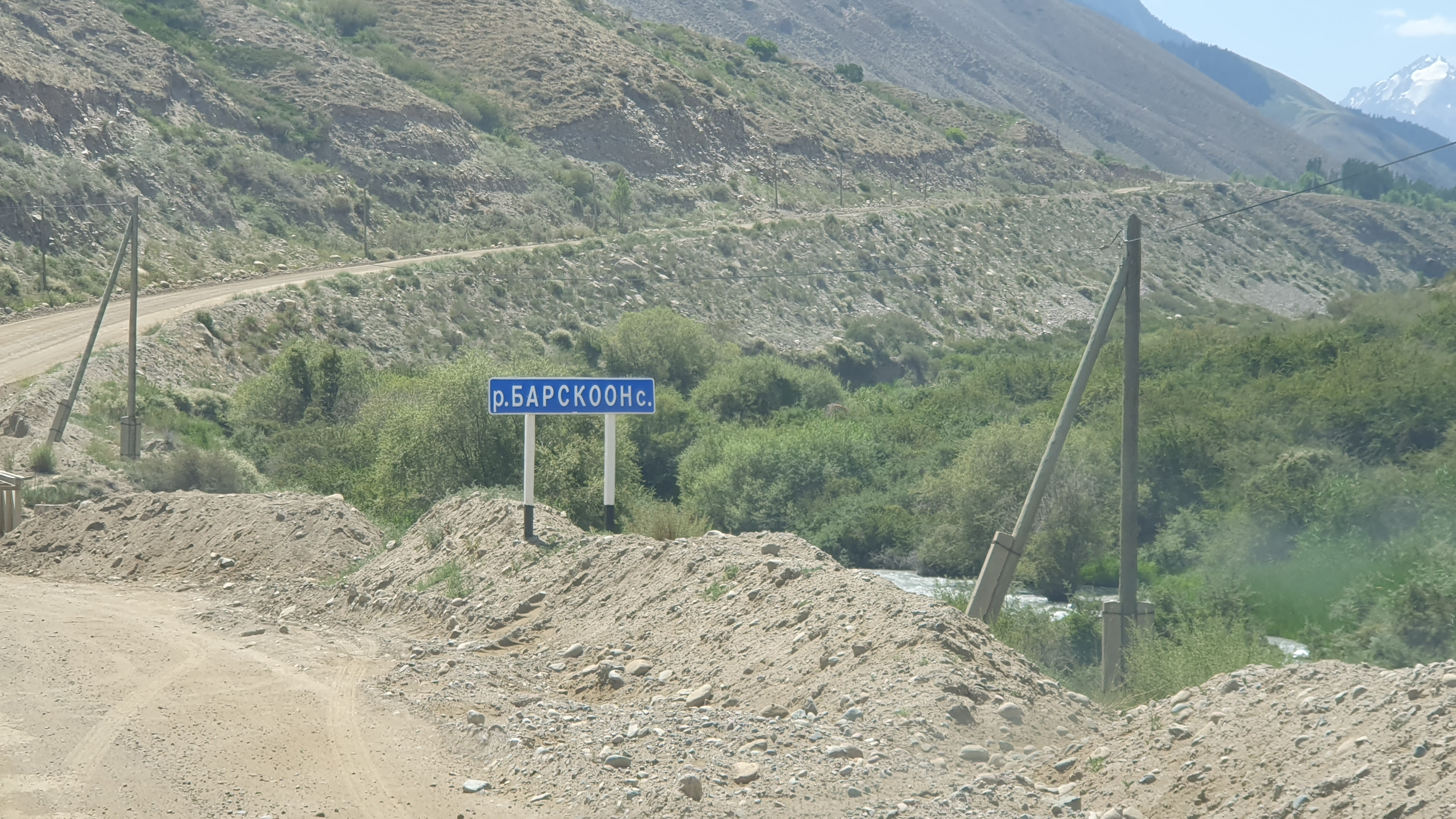

- Location in Kyrgyzstan
- Coordinates: 42°9′22″N 77°36′14″E
- Country: Kyrgyzstan
- Region: Issyk-Kul Region
- District: Jeti-Ögüz District
- Elevation: 1,753 m (5,751 ft)

Population (2023)
  - Total: 9,533

Barskoon (Kyrgyz: Барскоон; Russian: Барскаун, romanized: Barskaun; Persian: بارسغان) is a settlement on the southern shore of Lake Issyk Kul in the Issyk-Kul Region of Kyrgyzstan. Its population was 9,040 in 2021. It is on the A363 highway between Bökönbaev to the west and Kyzyl-Suu to the east.

== Geography ==
Barskoon is a village situated on the Barskoon River at the mouth of the Barskoon valley. The valley connects the southern shore of Issyk-Kul to the inland Ala-Bel plateau, the upper Naryn river valley, and further towards Xinjiang and northwestern China.

== History ==
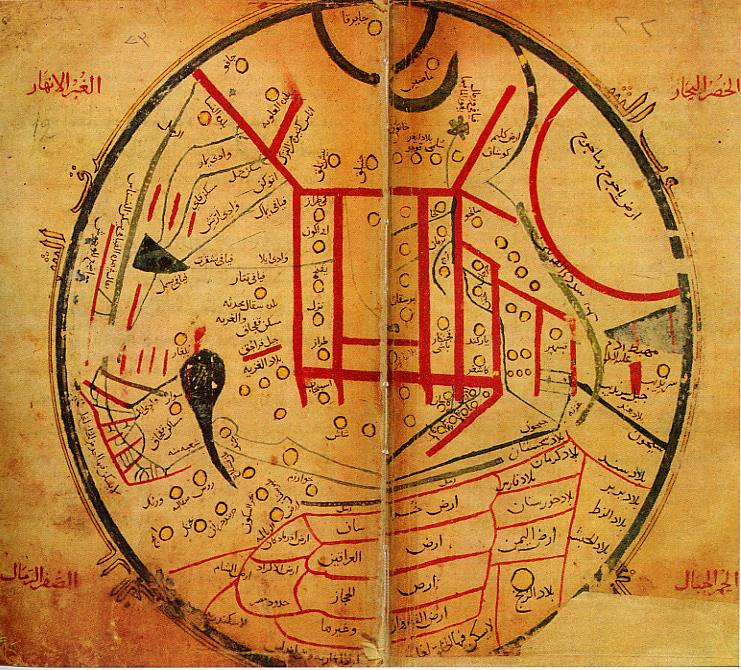
Mahmud al-Kashgari's world map, with Barskoon at the center written as برسقان (Barasqān)

Its prominent location made Barskoon an important trading post in the Middle Ages. A route of the ancient Silk Road passed through here, passing over the 4,284 m (14,055 ft) Bedel Pass into China. There are ruins of an ancient caravanserai in Barskoon, providing testament to the times when caravan routes dispersed from here China and India in the East and South. After the end of the Mongol Empire and the gradual decline of the Silk Road after the 1400s, the town began to lose prominence.

The modern town began as a Russian military post after the Russian conquest of Central Asia. During the 1916 uprising of the Kyrgyz against colonial rule known today as Urkun, large numbers of Kyrgyz attempted to flee through the Barskoon valley into China, and many perished at Bedel and Seok Pass. The name of Seok Pass ("Bone Pass") stems from this incident.

After the establishment of the Soviet Union, the ancient trade road became important for frontier defense against China. The border crossing at Bedel Pass was closed, and a new road, present-day A364, was built over Barskoon and Seok Pass towards Kara-Say, then east towards Ak-Shyyrak and Engilchek.

In 1997, the Kumtor Gold Mine was opened, and the road through the Barskoon valley became the main access road of the mine. In the spring of 1998, a lorry carrying cyanide used in the gold refining process was involved in an accident - leaving the road and crashing into a stream. The resulting pollution temporarily decimating the tourist industry around Lake Issyk Kul as many tourists cancelled their planned holidays.

== Population ==
Historical population
Year	Pop.	±% p.a.
2009	6,912	—
2021	9,040	+2.26%
Note: resident population; Sources:

== Etymology ==
The name appears as variants in medieval sources. The first mentioning is in the 9th-century Book of Roads and Kingdoms by 9th-century Persian geographer Ibn Khordadbeh.

According to his testament Pand nāma, Sabuktigin was from the tribe (or place) of Barskhan and according to C. E. Bosworth’s summary from preface of the book, the tribe was “so named because in ancient times, one of the rulers of Persia had settled in Turkestan and become a ruler there. He was called Pārsi-khwān (پارسی‌خوان) that is, one who is literate in Persian, and this became contracted to Barskhan. Popular folk etymologies link it to the snow leopard, called ilbirs in Kyrgyz and bars in many Turkic languages."

== Notable people ==
The 11th century scholar Mahmud al-Kashgari (also known as Barskhani) was a native of this area. His father Husayn was mayor of the village. Mahmud al-Kashgari is best known as the author of the Dīwān Lughāt al-Turk, the first comparative dictionary of the Turkic languages, which he wrote whilst living in Baghdad in 1072-4. His map of the then known world has Barskon at the centre of the world. His tomb is in Upal, a small town in present-day Xinjiang southwest of Kashgar on the Karakoram Highway to Pakistan.

Barskoon is also known as the birthplace of Abu Mansur Sabuktigin. Born there in 942, he was later sold as a slave to Alp-Tegin, the commander-in-chief of the Samanid rulers of Bukhara. Sabuktigin became one of the most prominent generals of 10th-century Central Asia, married Alptigin's daughter, and became the founder of the Ghaznavid dynasty, which ruled large parts of Iran, Afghanistan and northwestern India until 1186.

== Sights ==
Barskoon is a popular tourist destination and home to tourism companies, such as Shepherd's Way Trekking. The Barskoon valley has an impressive Barskoon waterfall and is a good centre for trekking and horse riding. There are two interesting sights along the road - a Soviet lorry mounted on a plinth and a bust of Yuri Gagarin, who holidayed on the South shore of Issyk Kul after his historical first human space flight.

West is the village of Tamga, which is famous for a rock ("Tamga-Tash") with a Buddhist inscription dating from the 3rd to 8th centuries, which the locals interpreted as a Tamga.

In the mountains to the south-east is a region known as syrt - an "alpine cold desert" located at average altitudes around 3,600 m (11,800 ft). A364, one of the few good roads into the mountains in southern Issyk-Kul Region, goes south down the valley, over the Barskoon and Söök Passes to Kara-Say in the Naryn valley and then east to Ak-Shyrak. There is a border police post located at Kara-Say, and a border area permit is needed for onward travel. The through road beyond Ak-Shyrak to Engilchek is currently not passable as of 2017.
