= Saruu =

Saruu Саруу
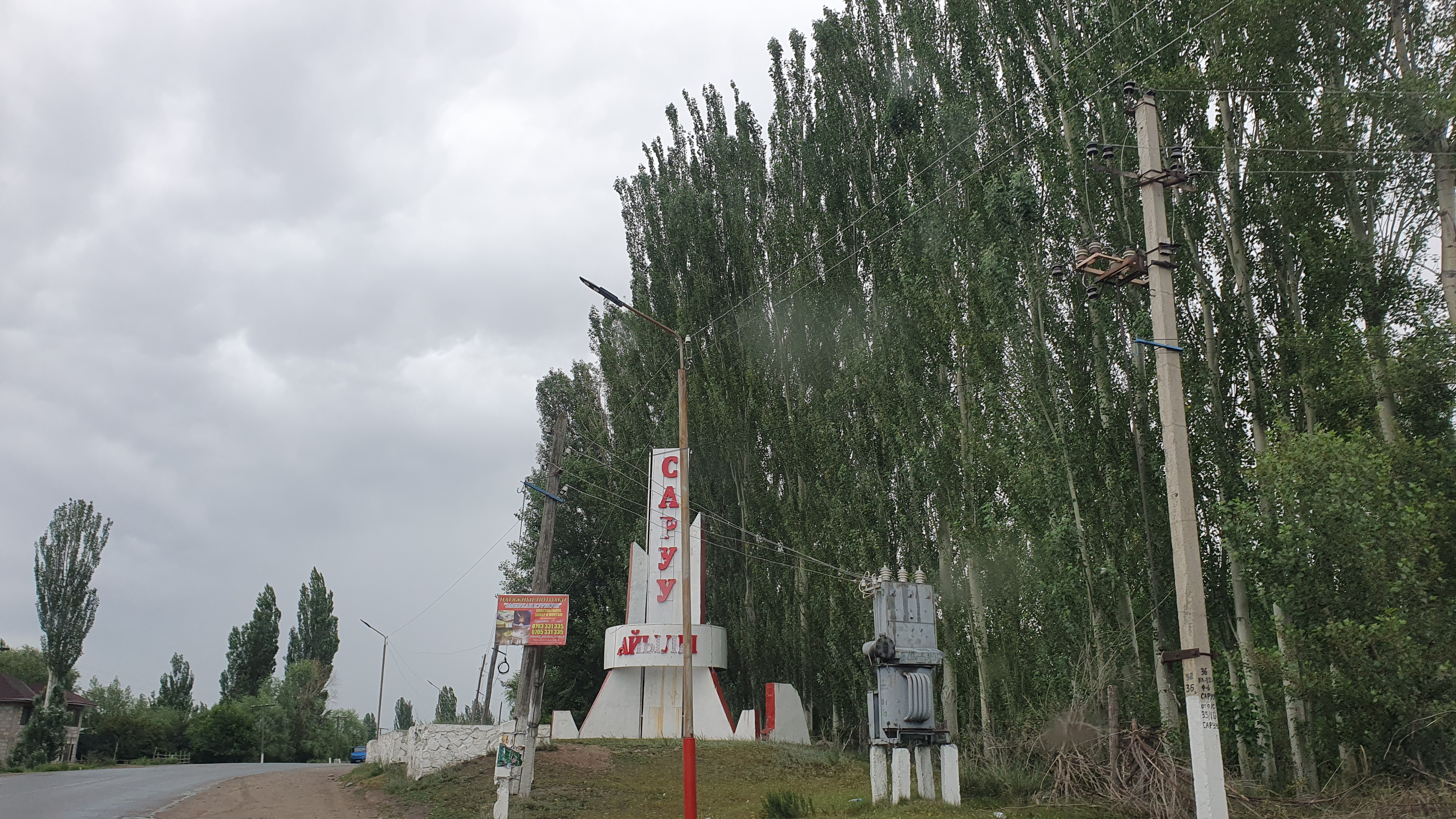

- Location within Kyrgyzstan
- Coordinates: 42°19′20″N 77°55′20″E
- Country: Kyrgyzstan
- Region: Issyk-Kul
- District: Jeti-Ögüz

Population (2023)
  - Total: 8,501
- Time zone: UTC+6

Saruu (Kyrgyz: Саруу) is a village in Issyk-Kul Region of Kyrgyzstan. It is part of the Jeti-Ögüz District. Its population was 8,217 in 2021. It lies near the outflow of the river Juuku into Lake Issyk-Kul.

== Population ==
Historical population
Year	Pop.	±% p.a.
2009	6,178	—
2021	8,217	+2.41%
Note: resident population; Sources:
