= Söök Pass =

- Syook Pass
- Location within Kyrgyzstan
- Elevation: 4,028 metres (13,215 ft)

Third Approach
- Location: Kyrgyzstan
- Range: Tian Shan
- Coordinates: 41°44′53.7″N 77°47′20.7″E

Söök Pass, Syook Pass, or Suyak Pass (Russian: перевал Сёок, Kyrgyz: Сөөк ашуусу) is a mountain pass in the Terskey Alatoo mountain range of Kyrgyzstan. Its elevation of 4,028 metres (13,220 ft) makes it the third highest mountain pass in Kyrgyzstan after Bedel Pass and Kyzylart Pass, and the highest one that is not on a border. It connects the Ala-Bel plateau, where the Kumtor Gold Mine is located, to the upper Naryn River valley.

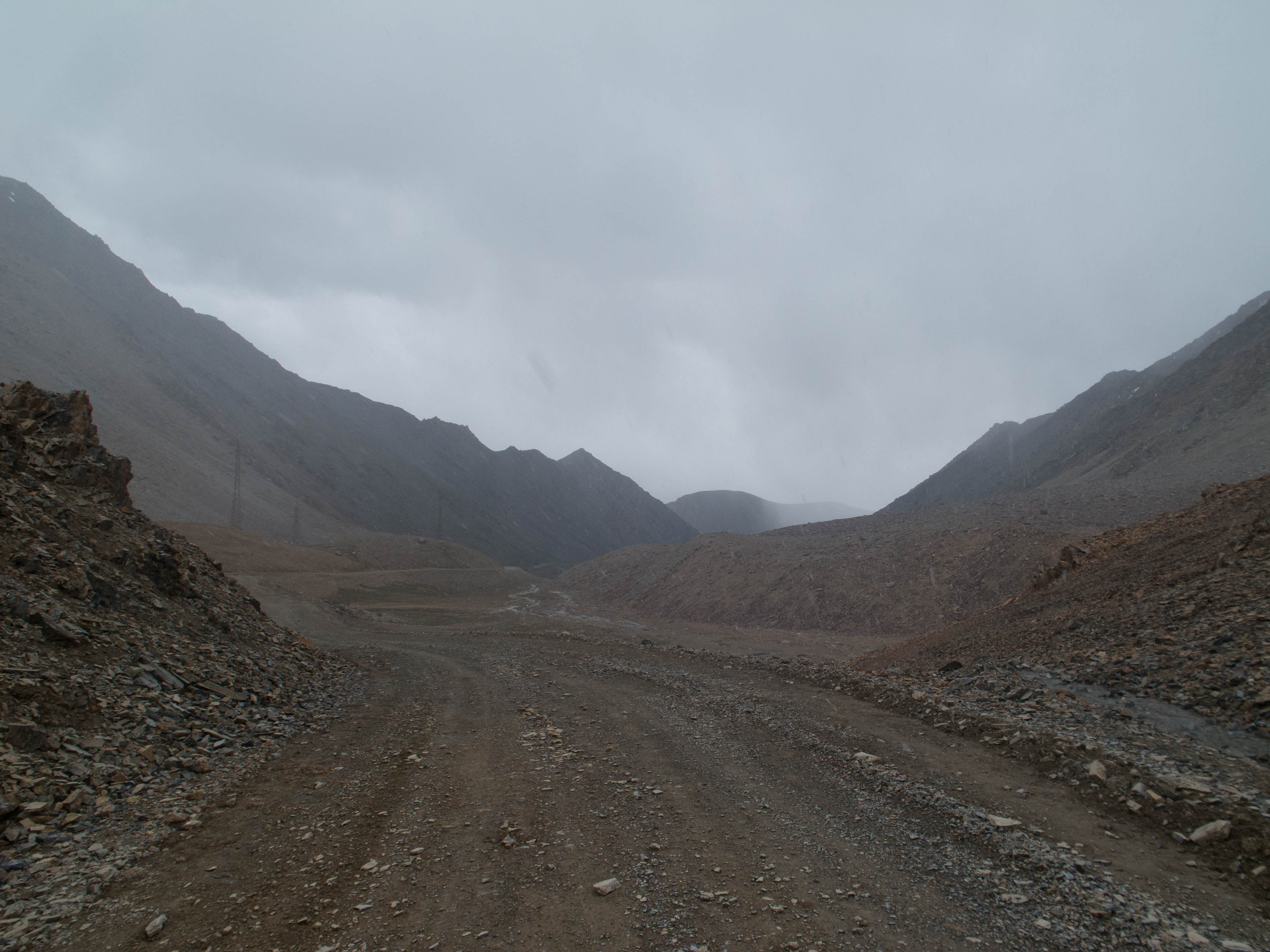
The A364 road at Söök Pass, facing southeast

Söök Pass is situated on the ancient Silk Road route connecting Barskon on Lake Issyk-Kul and Kashgar in China's Xinjiang province across the Tian Shan mountains. It is one of three major passes on this route, located between Barskoon Pass (elevation 3,819 metres [12,530 ft]) and Bedel Pass (elevation 4,284 metres [14,060 ft]). As the border road over Bedel Pass to China has remained closed since Soviet times, Söök Pass is nowadays significant mainly as a strategic gateway on the A364 road to the southeastern high mountain desert areas of Kyrgyzstan along the Chinese border, and to the border posts at Kara-Say and Ak-Shyrak.

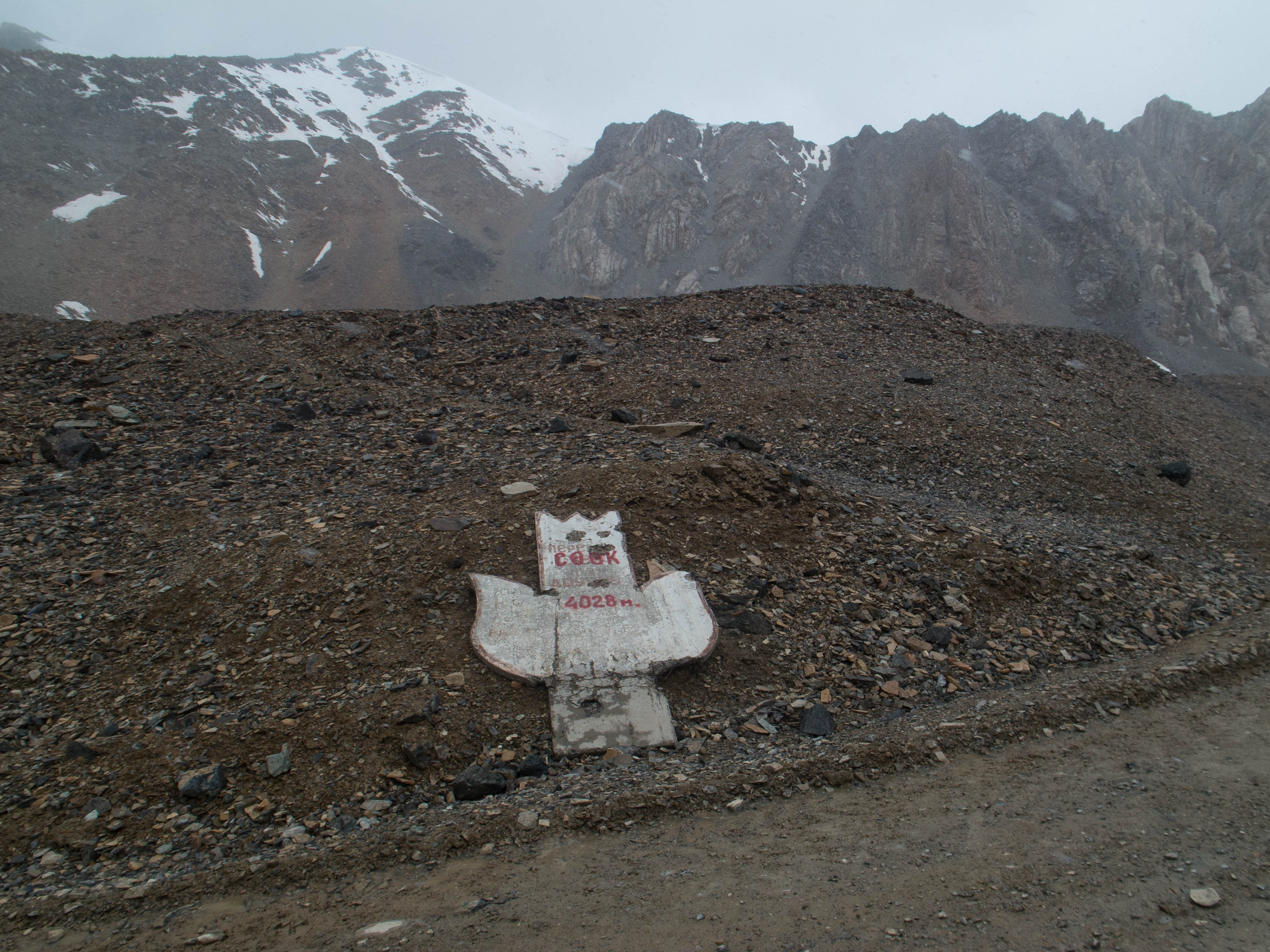
Roadside marker at Söök Pass, altitude 4,028 metres (13,220 ft)

The name means "Bone Pass" in Kyrgyz, a reference to the Urkun incident of 1916, when thousands of Kyrgyz died attempting to cross the border into China, fleeing from Tsarist Russian forces.

The condition of the pass can be seen using Google Maps satellite imagery.
