= Munduz, Jeti-Ögüz =

Munduz Мундуз
- Location within Kyrgyzstan
- Coordinates: 42°26′37″N 78°08′29″E
- Country: Kyrgyzstan
- Region: Issyk-Kul Region
- District: Jeti-Ögüz District

Population (2023)
  - Total: 752
- Time zone: UTC+6

Munduz (Kyrgyz: Мундуз) is a village in the Issyk-Kul Region of Kyrgyzstan. It is part of the Jeti-Ögüz District. Its population was 707 in 2021.

== Population ==
Historical population
Year	Pop.	±% p.a.
2009	517	—
2021	707	+2.64%
Note: resident population; Sources:
