= Bogatyrovka =

Bogatyrovka Богатыровка
- village
- Location within Kyrgyzstan
- Coordinates: 42°31′40″N 78°08′53″E
- Country: Kyrgyzstan
- Region: Issyk-Kul Region
- District: Jeti-Ögüz District
- Elevation: 1,640 m (5,380 ft)

Population (2023)
  - Total: 1,303

Bogatyrovka is a village in the Jeti-Ögüz District of Issyk-Kul Region of Kyrgyzstan. Its population was 1,276 in 2021.
