= Kichi-Jargylchak =

Kichi-Jargylchak Кичи-Жаргылчак
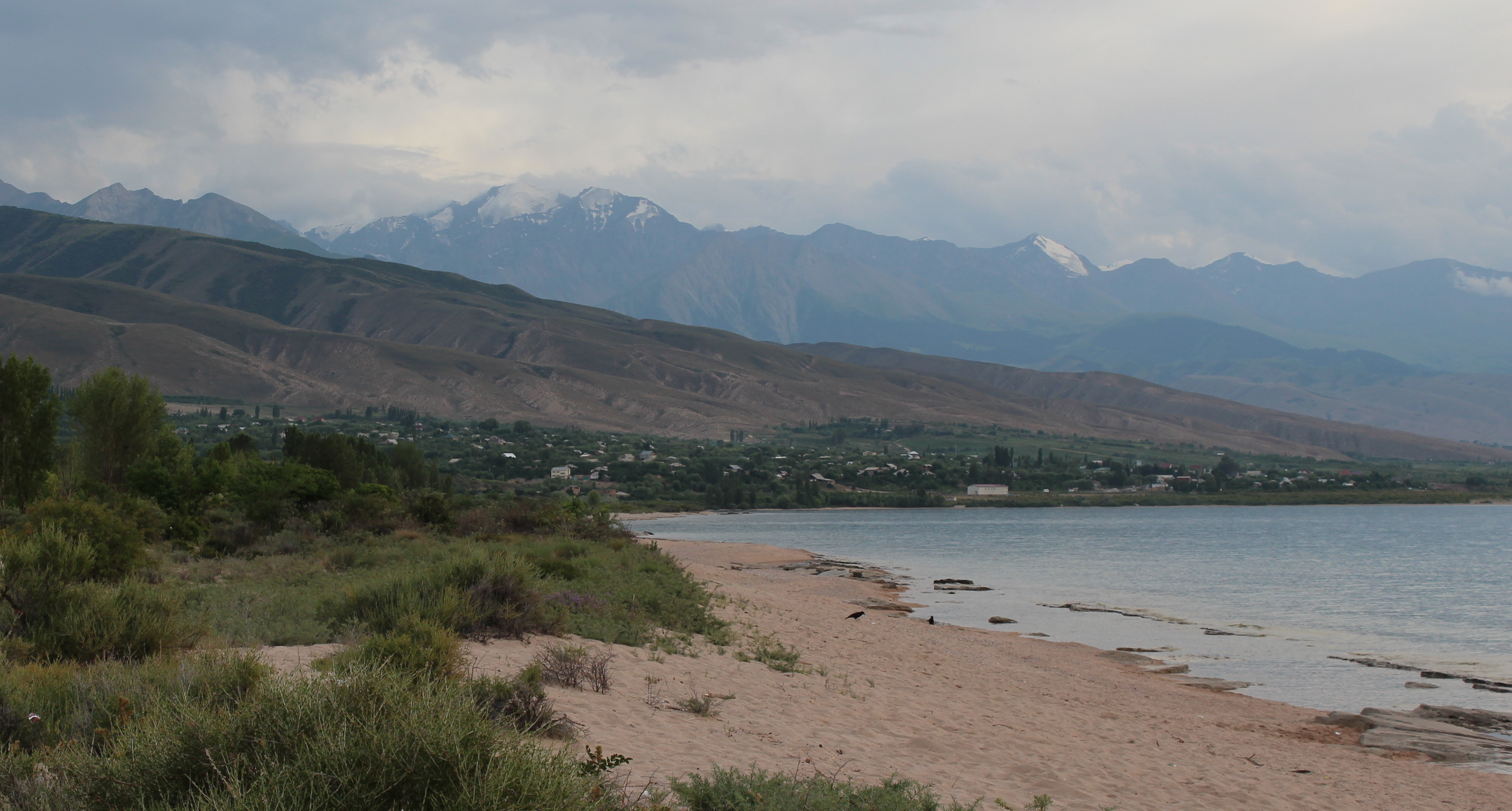
- Kichi Jargylchak as seen from the beach at Ak Terek

- Location of Kichi Jargylchak in Kyrgyzstan
- Coordinates: 42.207°N 77.688°E
- Country: Kyrgyzstan
- Region: Issyk Kul
- District: Jeti-Ögüz
- Elevation: 1,649 m (5,410 ft)

Population (2023)
  - Total: 3,872
- Time zone: UTC+6

Kichi-Jargylchak (Kyrgyz: Кичи-Жаргылчак, Kyrgyz pronunciation: [kiʧiʤɑrʁɯlʧɑ́q]) is a village in the Jeti-Ögüz District of the Issyk-Kul Region in Kyrgyzstan. It is located right at the shores of Issyk Kul and at the base of the Teskey Ala-Too Range, at an elevation of 1649 meters. Its population wa 3,738 in 2021.

== Name ==
The name of the village means "small grist mill".

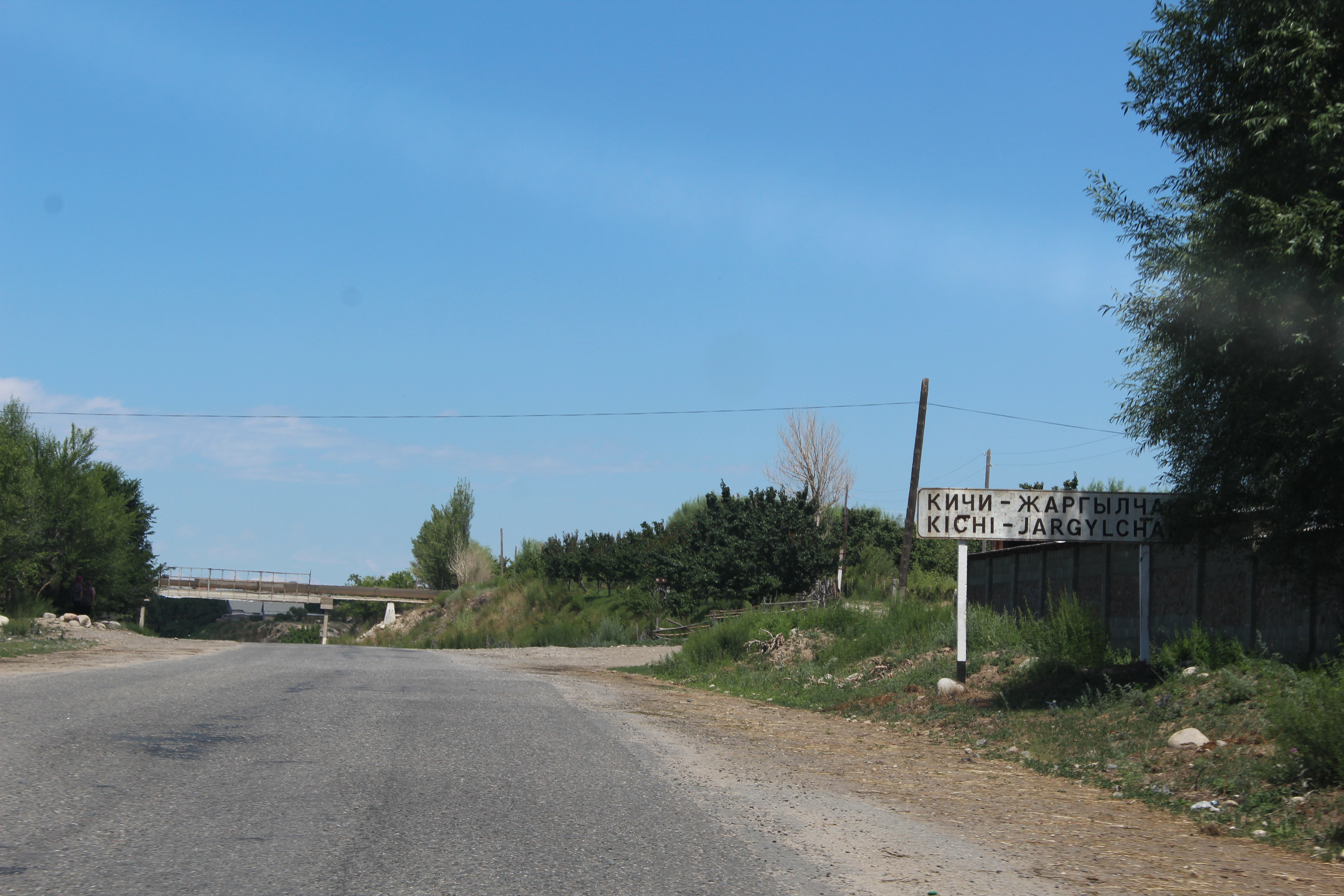
Sign telling the city limits of Kichi Jargylchak village from the north

== See also ==
- Chong-Jargylchak, a nearby village whose name means "large grist mill"
