= Darkan, Iran =

Darkan or Derkan or Darakan (Persian: دركان) may refer to the following places in Iran:

- Darkan, Isfahan
- Darkan, Sistan and Baluchestan, in Sistan and Baluchestan Province
