= Ak-Terek, Issyk-Kul =

Ak-Terek Ак-Терек
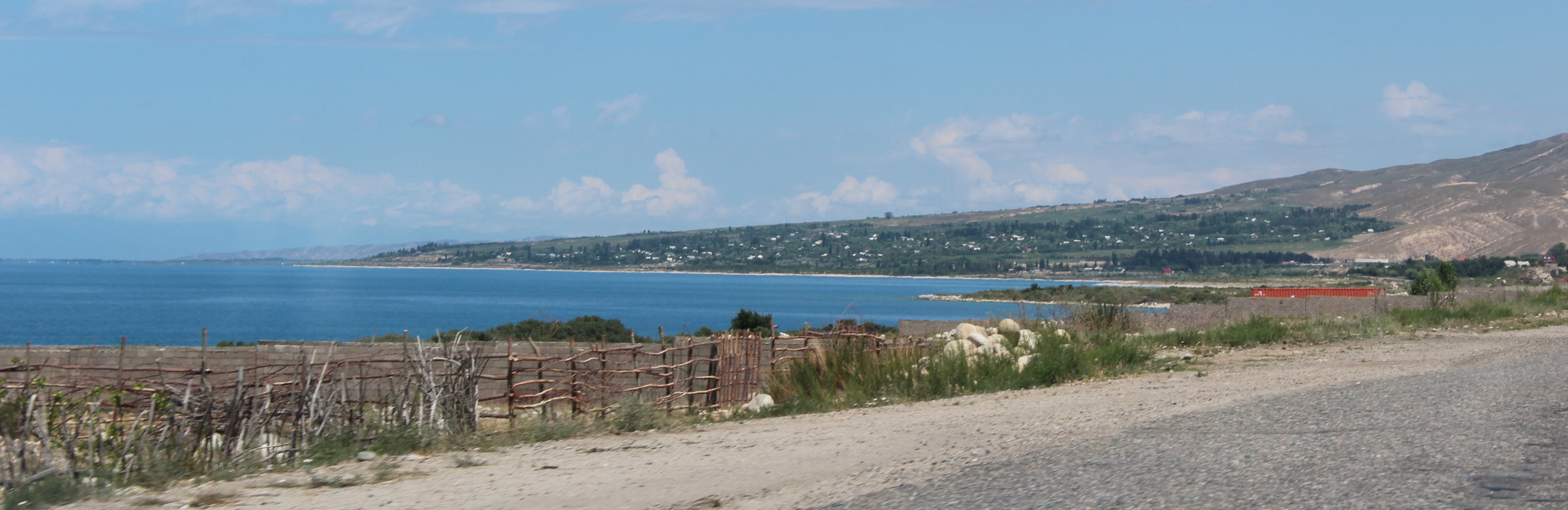
- Ak Terek as seen from Kichi Jargylchak

- Location of Ak-Terek in Kyrgyzstan
- Coordinates: 42.236°N 77.727°E
- Country: Kyrgyzstan
- Region: Issyk-Kul
- District: Jeti-Ögüz

Population (2023)
  - Total: 4,479

Ak-Terek (Kyrgyz: Ак Терек, IPA: [ɑqtʰeɾék]) is a village in the Jeti-Ögüz District of the Issyk-Kul Region in Kyrgyzstan. Its population was 4,327 in 2021.

== Climate ==
Climate data for Ak-Terek (1991–2020)
Month	Jan	Feb	Mar	Apr	May	Jun	Jul	Aug	Sep	Oct	Nov	Dec	Year
Daily mean °C (°F)	−1.8 (28.8)	−0.7 (30.7)	4.2 (39.6)	9.8 (49.6)	13.6 (56.5)	17.5 (63.5)	20.1 (68.2)	19.8 (67.6)	15.8 (60.4)	9.9 (49.8)	4.2 (39.6)	0.2 (32.4)	9.4 (48.9)
Source: NOAA
