= Jeti-Ögüz resort =

Jeti-Ögüz resort Жети-Өгүз (курорт)
- village
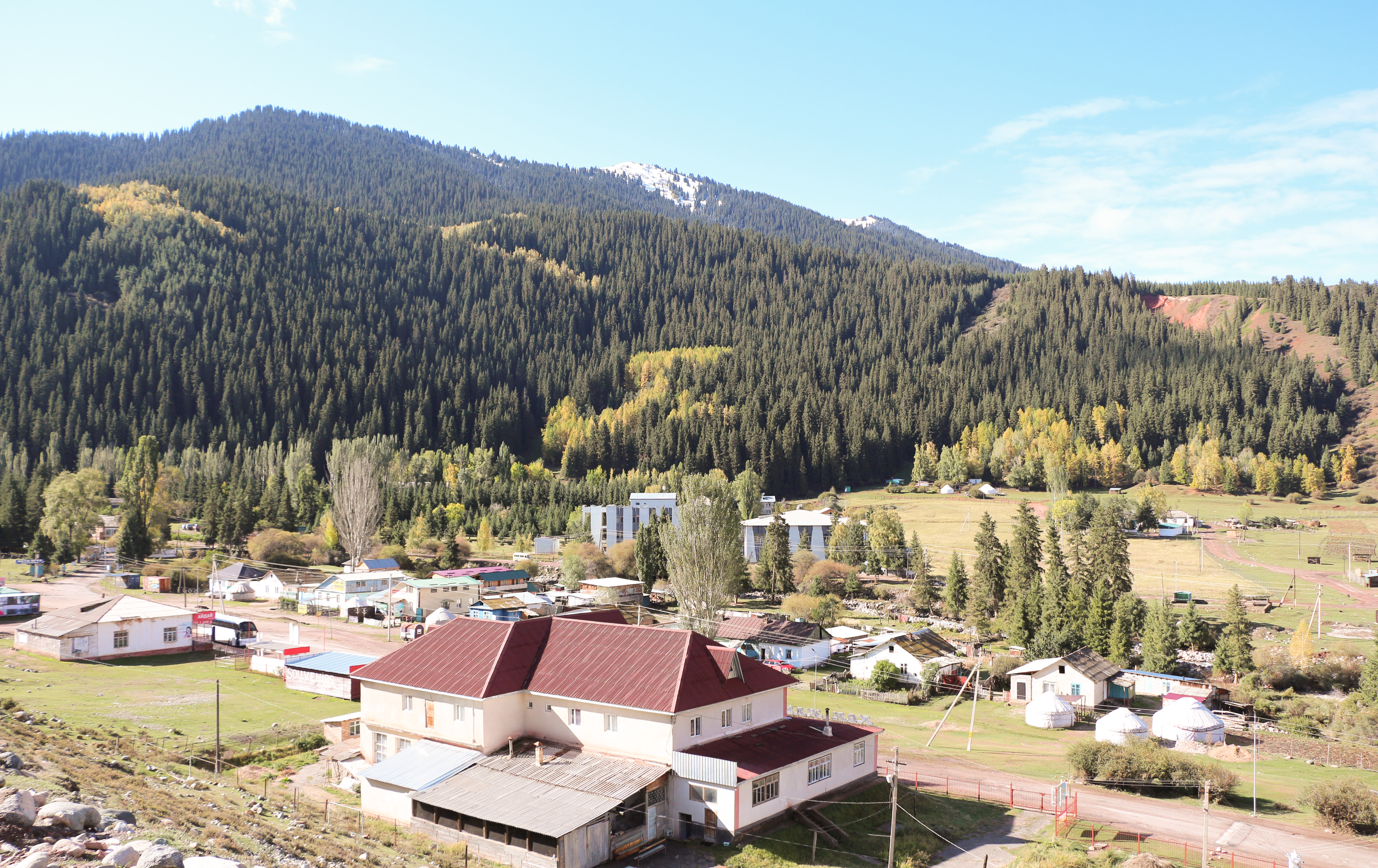
- A view of Jeti-Ögüz

- Location within Kyrgyzstan
- Coordinates: 42°19′50″N 78°14′23″E
- Country: Kyrgyzstan
- Region: Issyk-Kul Region
- District: Jeti-Ögüz District

Population (2023)
  - Total: 328

Jeti-Ögüz (Kyrgyz: Жети-Өгүз, romanized: Jeti-Ögüz, lit. 'seven bulls') is a balneotherapic resort located at the Jeti-Ögüz Rocks near Issyk Kul in the Jeti-Ögüz District of Issyk-Kul Region of Kyrgyzstan, about 28 km west of Karakol, and near Jeti-Ögüz village. Its population was 337 in 2021.

== History ==
The thermal springs of Jeti-Ögüz were known to local inhabitants since antiquity. The place became known to Europe after 1856 when Semenov-Tian-Shanskii first visited it. Since 1965 the resort operates year-round. In 1991, an important meeting between Boris Yeltsin and Askar Akayev took place in Jeti-Ögüz.

== Places of interest ==
This resort is a common destination of interest for citizens of Kyrgyzstan, as well as a popular destination for tourists to Kyrgyzstan. The Jeti-Ögüz Rocks are located in the vicinity of the resort. From the resort, with a hike or ride on horse-back of several hours, one may reach a waterfall located in a gully, as well as a pine-tree plantation. This is a popular trek for tourists and visitors.

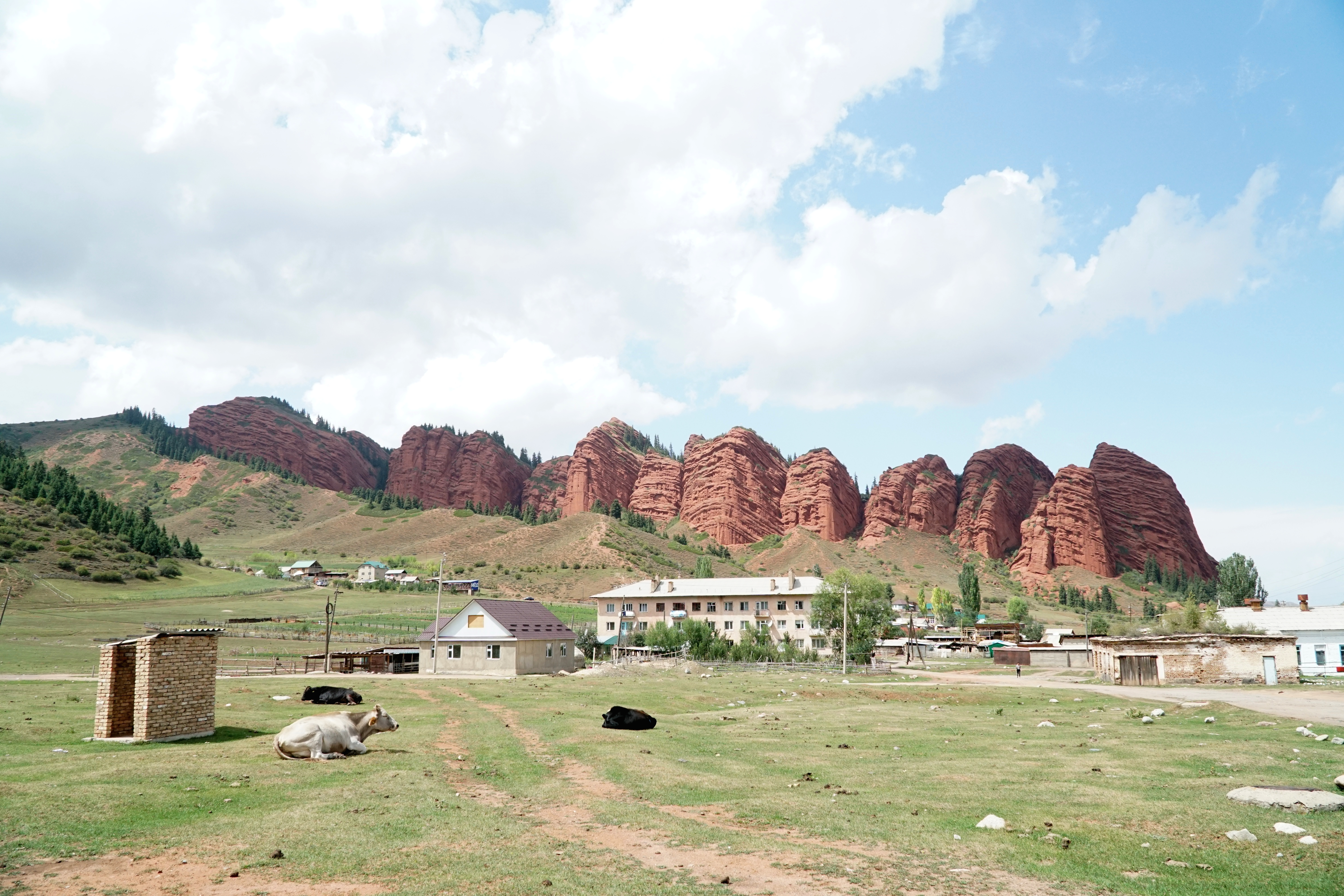

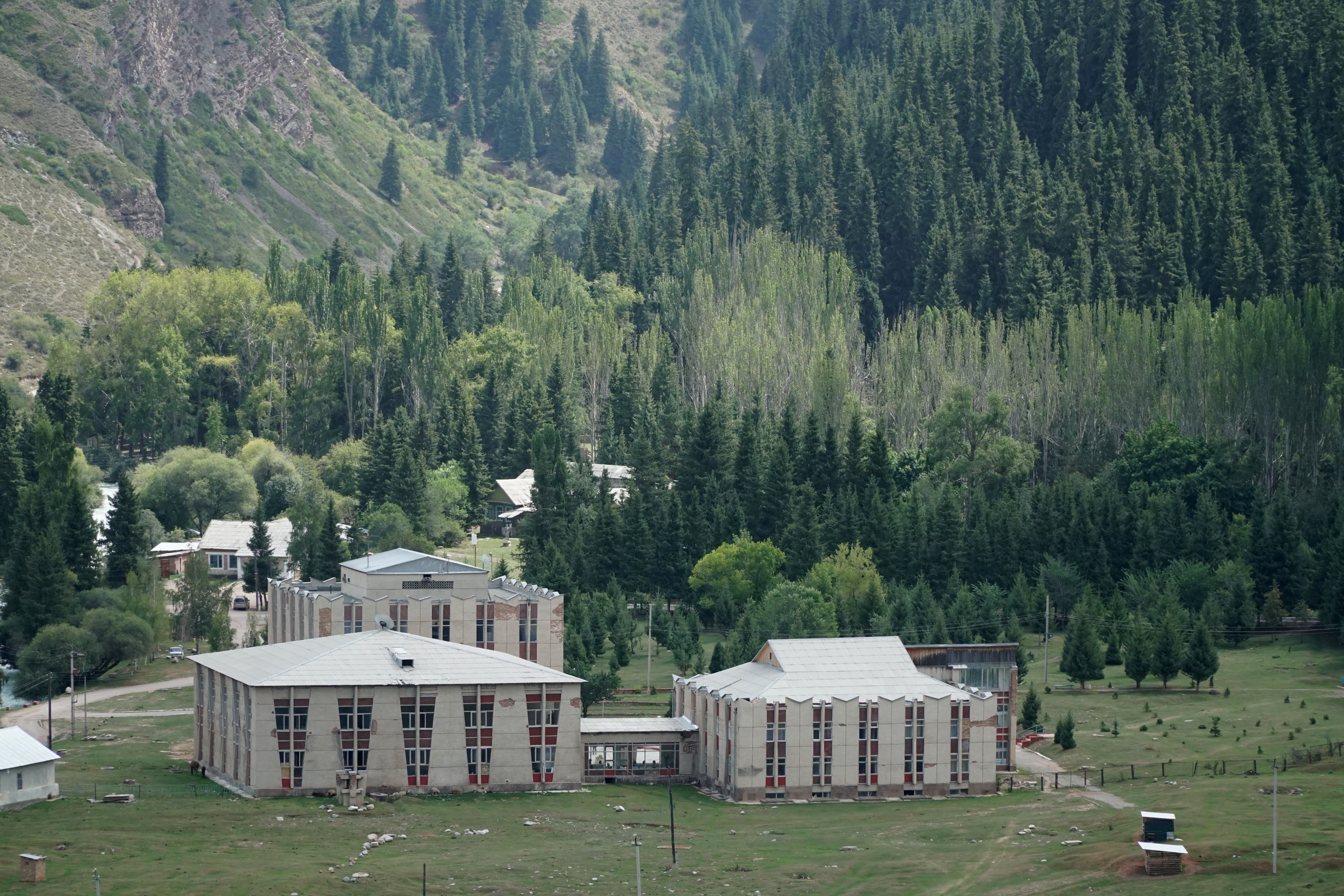

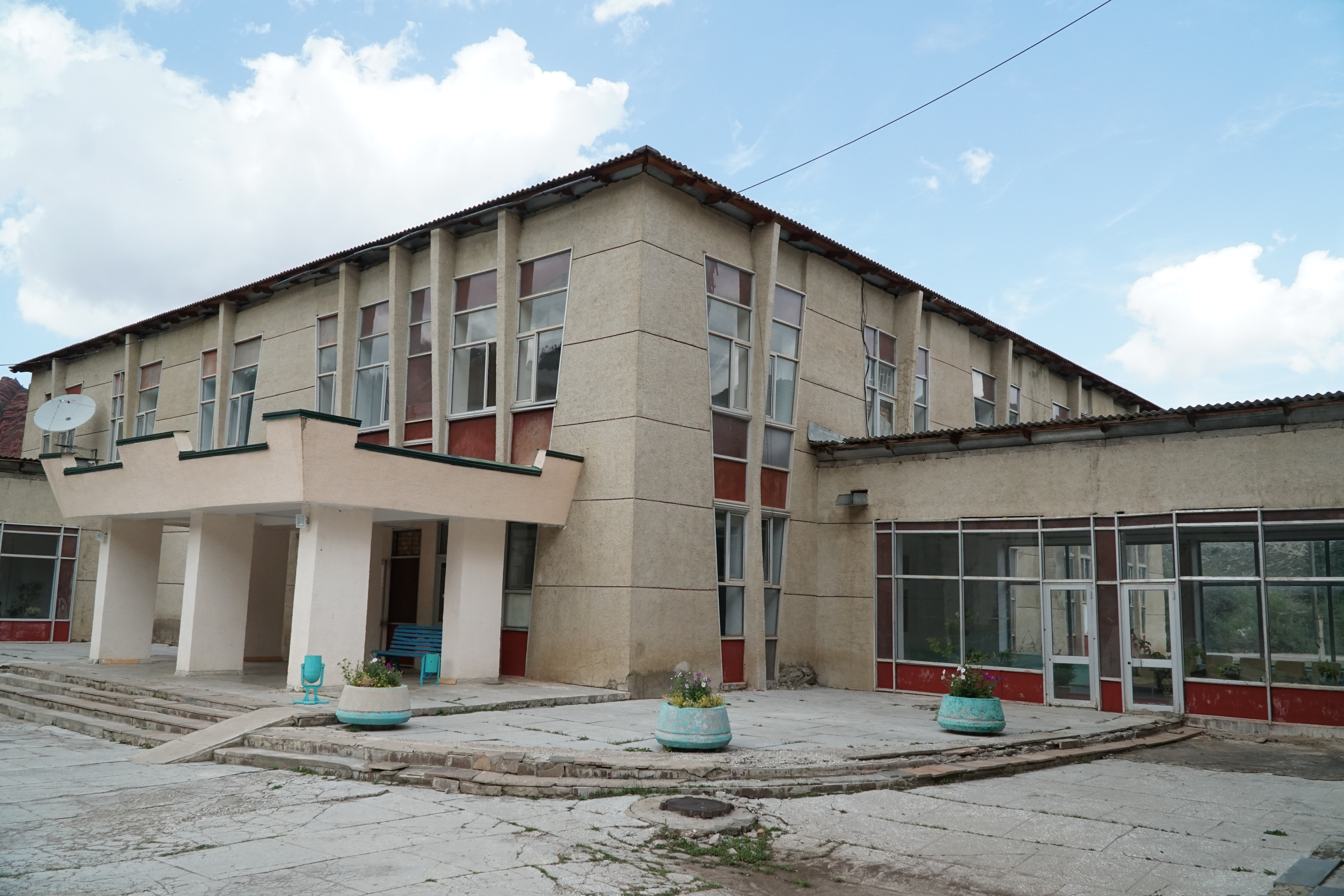

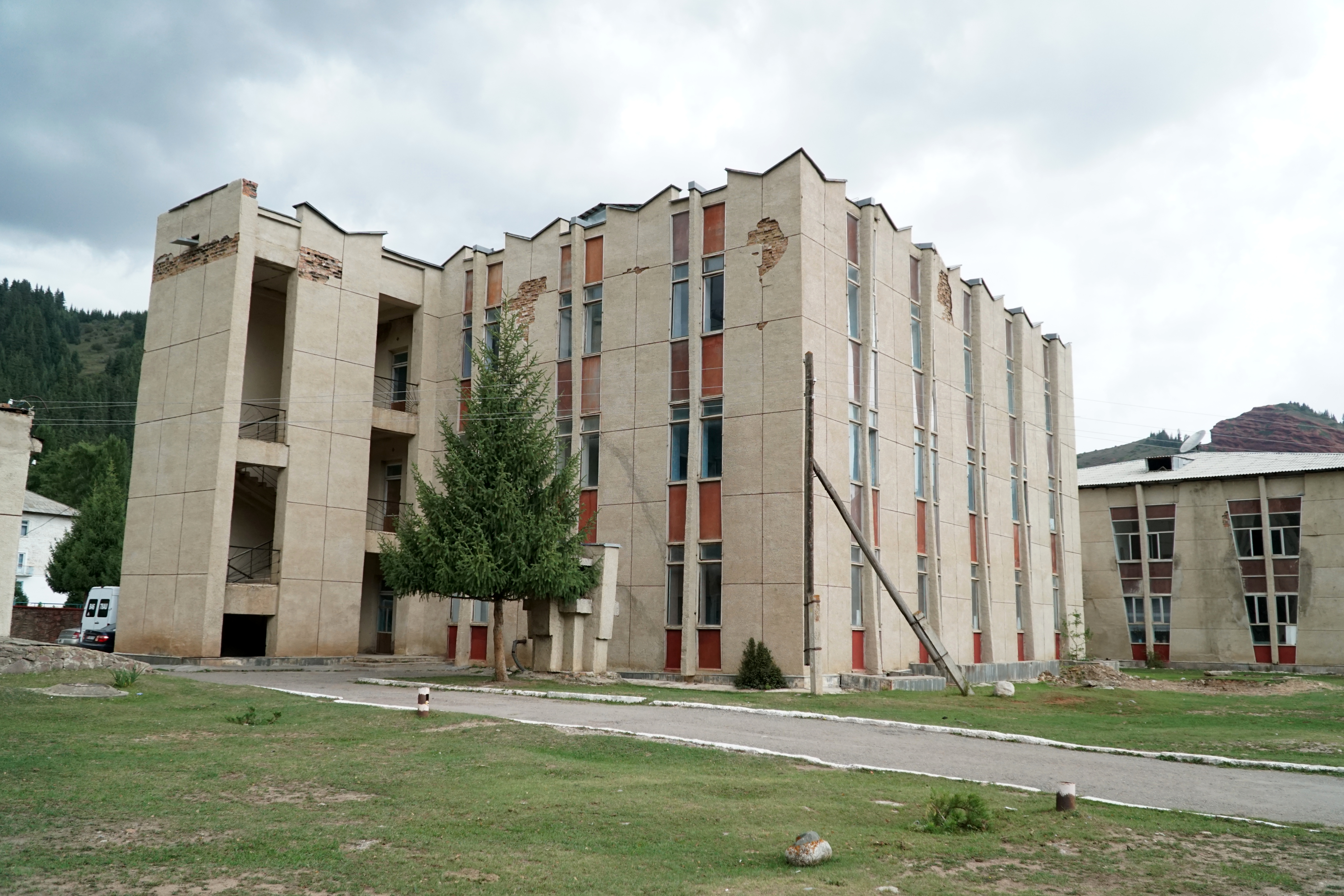

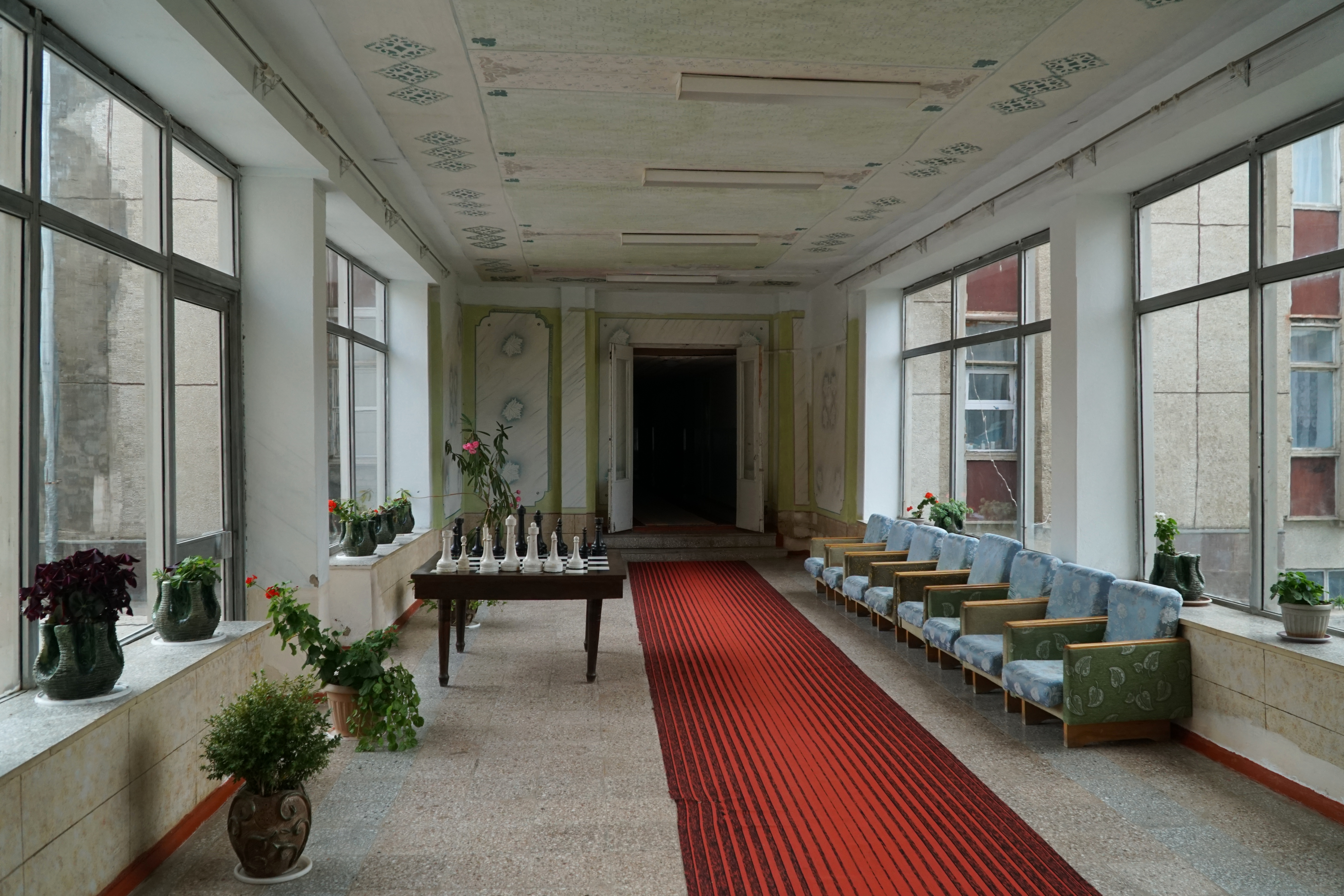

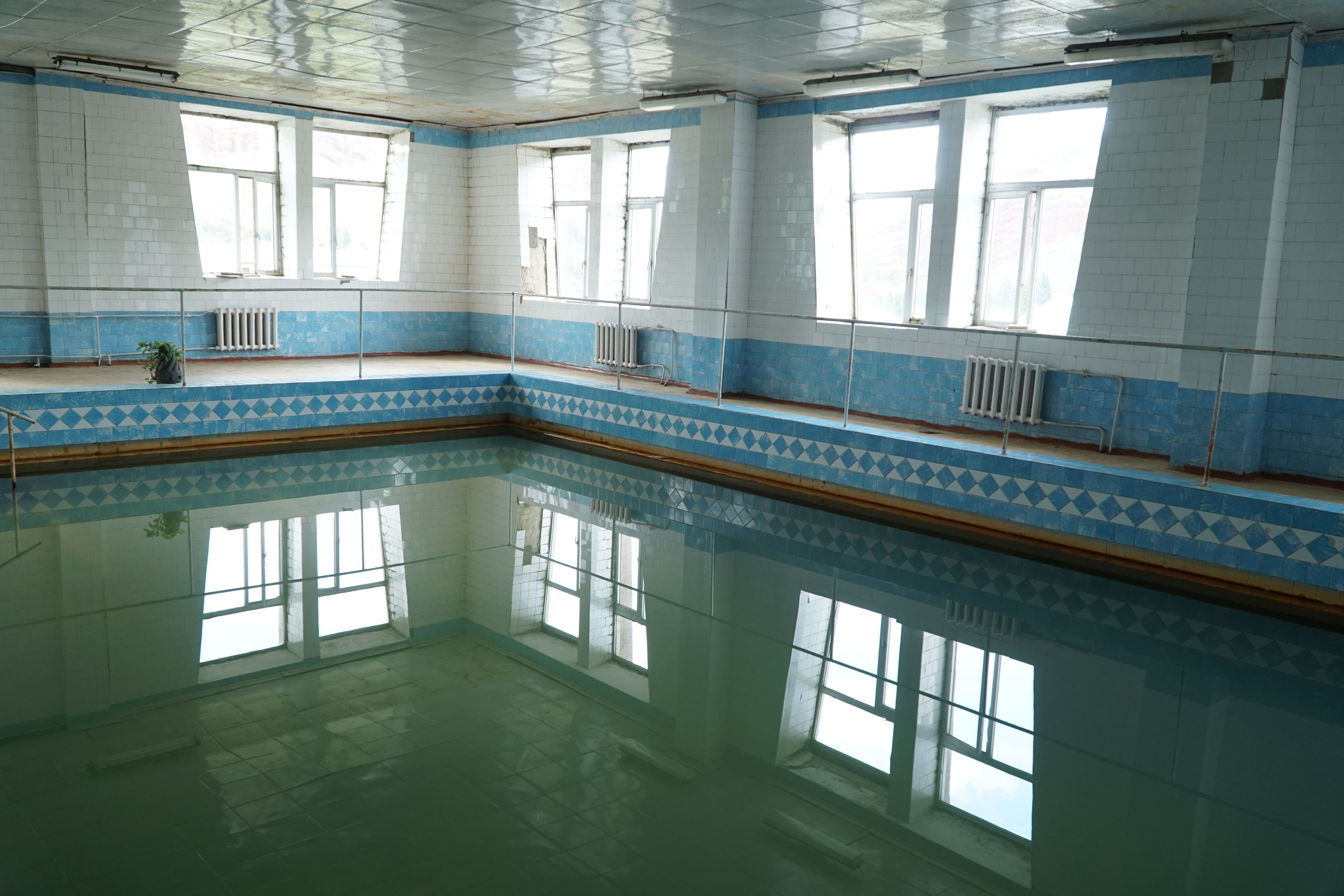
