= Bedel Pass =

Mountain pass between Kyrgyzstan and China

- Location within Southern Xinjiang Location within Kyrgyzstan
- Interactive map of Bedel Pass
- Elevation: 4,284 metres (14,055 ft)

Third Approach
- Location: Kyrgyzstan and Xinjiang, China
- Range: Tian Shan Mountains
- Coordinates: 41°24′30″N 78°24′30″E

Bedel Pass
- Traditional Chinese: 別迭里山口
- Simplified Chinese: 别迭里山口
- Literal meaning: Bedel pass
Transcriptions
Standard Mandarin
- Hanyu Pinyin: Biédiéli shānkǒu

Alternative Chinese name
- Traditional Chinese: 勃達嶺
- Simplified Chinese: 勃达岭
- Literal meaning: Bedel ridge
Transcriptions
Standard Mandarin
- Hanyu Pinyin: Bódá lǐng

Second alternative Chinese name
- Traditional Chinese: 撥達嶺
- Simplified Chinese: 拨达岭
- Literal meaning: Bedel ridge
Transcriptions
Standard Mandarin
- Hanyu Pinyin: Bádá lǐng

Bedel Pass (Kyrgyz: Бедел ашуусу, بەدەل اشۇۇسۇ; Uyghur: بەدەل ئېغىزى; Chinese: 别迭里山口) is a mountain pass in the Tian Shan Mountains range between Kyrgyzstan and China's Xinjiang. It has an elevation of 4,284 meters (14,055 ft). The pass linked China to Barskon, a settlement on the southern shore of lake Issyk-kul.

== History ==
Historically, the Bedel Pass served as a Silk Road trade route between China and Central Asia. On the Chinese side, the Bedel Beacon Tower (別迭里烽燧) is located on the foothills along the path. It was built during the Han dynasty as part of the Han Great Wall. The beacon was reused and renovated during the Tang dynasty. During the Sui and Tang dynasties, the pass was the main trade route linking Tarim Basin and Western Turks in Central Asia.

A number of scholars argue that Chinese explorer Xuanzang who inspired the Chinese classic Journey to the West used this pass in the 7th century on his journey to India. The name Xuanzang used for the passage was "凌山", it was said to be northwest of "Kingdom of Baluka", modern day city of Aksu. However, others argue that was Muzart Pass.

The pass was surveyed in 1881 by both Chinese and Russian counterparts as part of Protocol of Chuguchak of 1864 demarcating the border in the region between the Russian Empire and the Qing dynasty. During the Urkun incident of 1916, over 100,000 Kyrgyz reportedly died fleeing from Tsarist forces they attempted to reach China through the Bedel Pass.

Kumtor Gold Mine is located down the road on the Kyrgyz side. Along the path on the Chinese side is also the ruins of a KMT era sentry post which is a local cultural heritage site.

== Historical maps ==
Historical maps of the region including Bedel Pass:

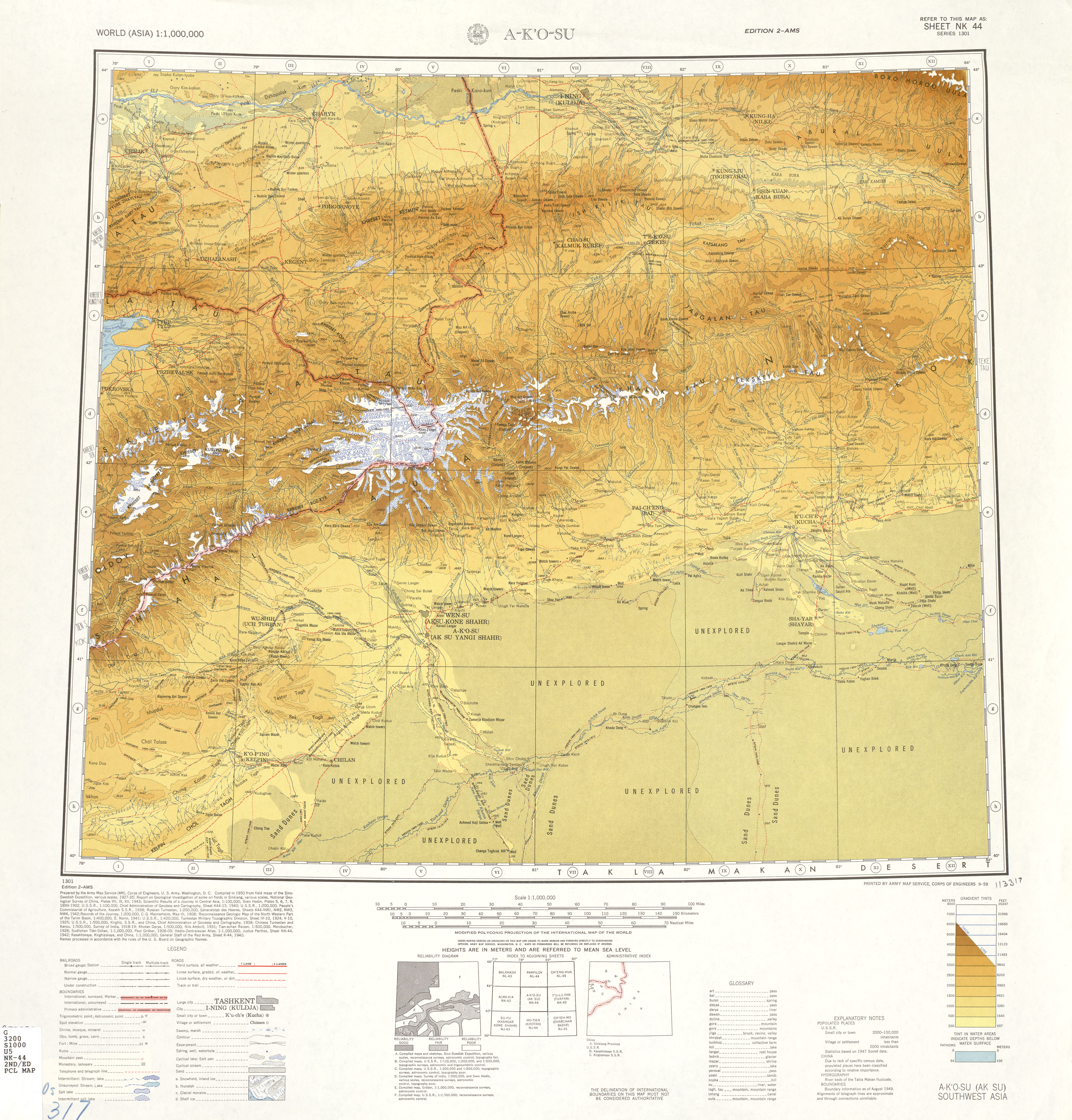
Map including Bedel Pass (labeled as Pereval Bedel')

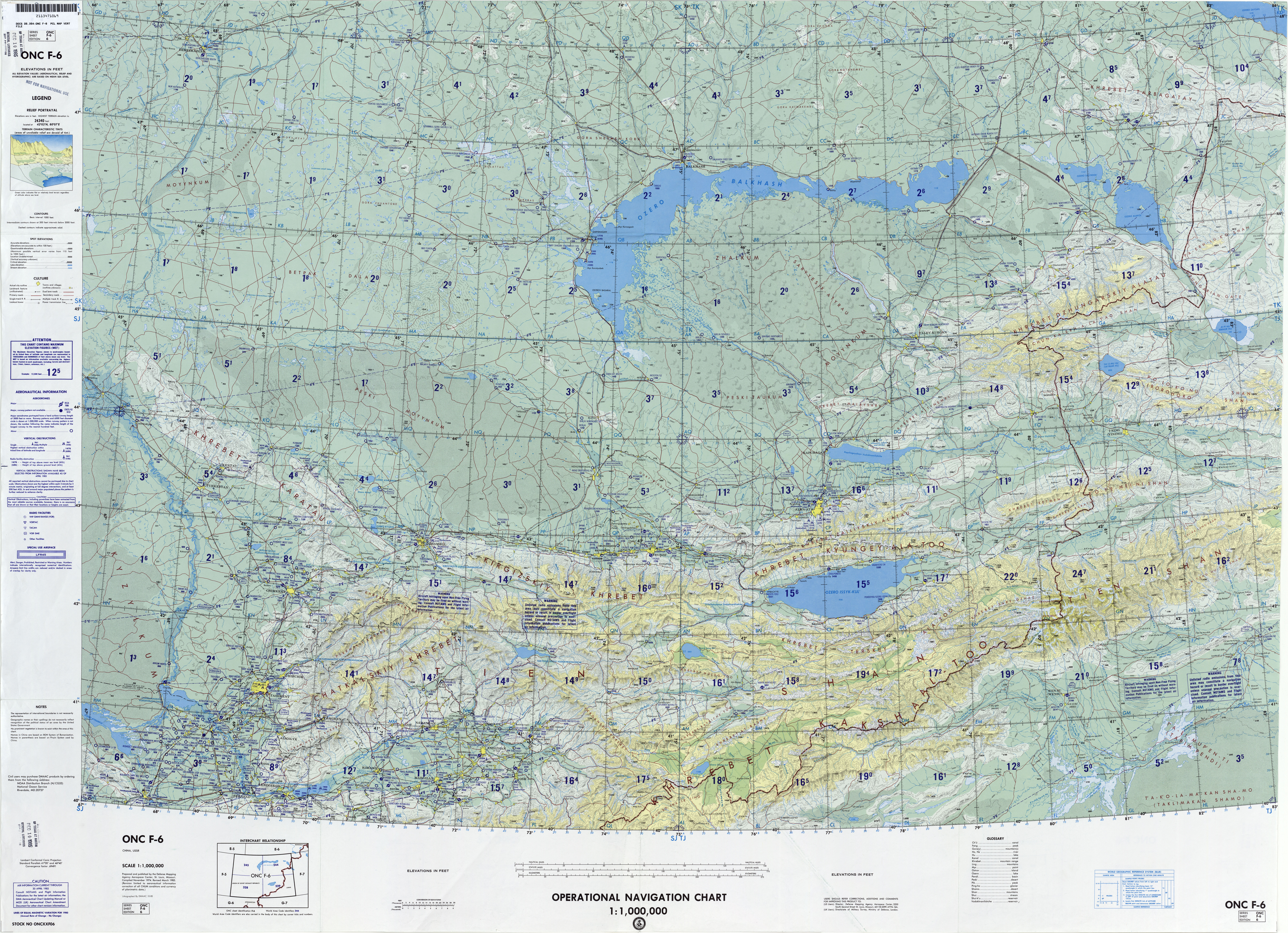

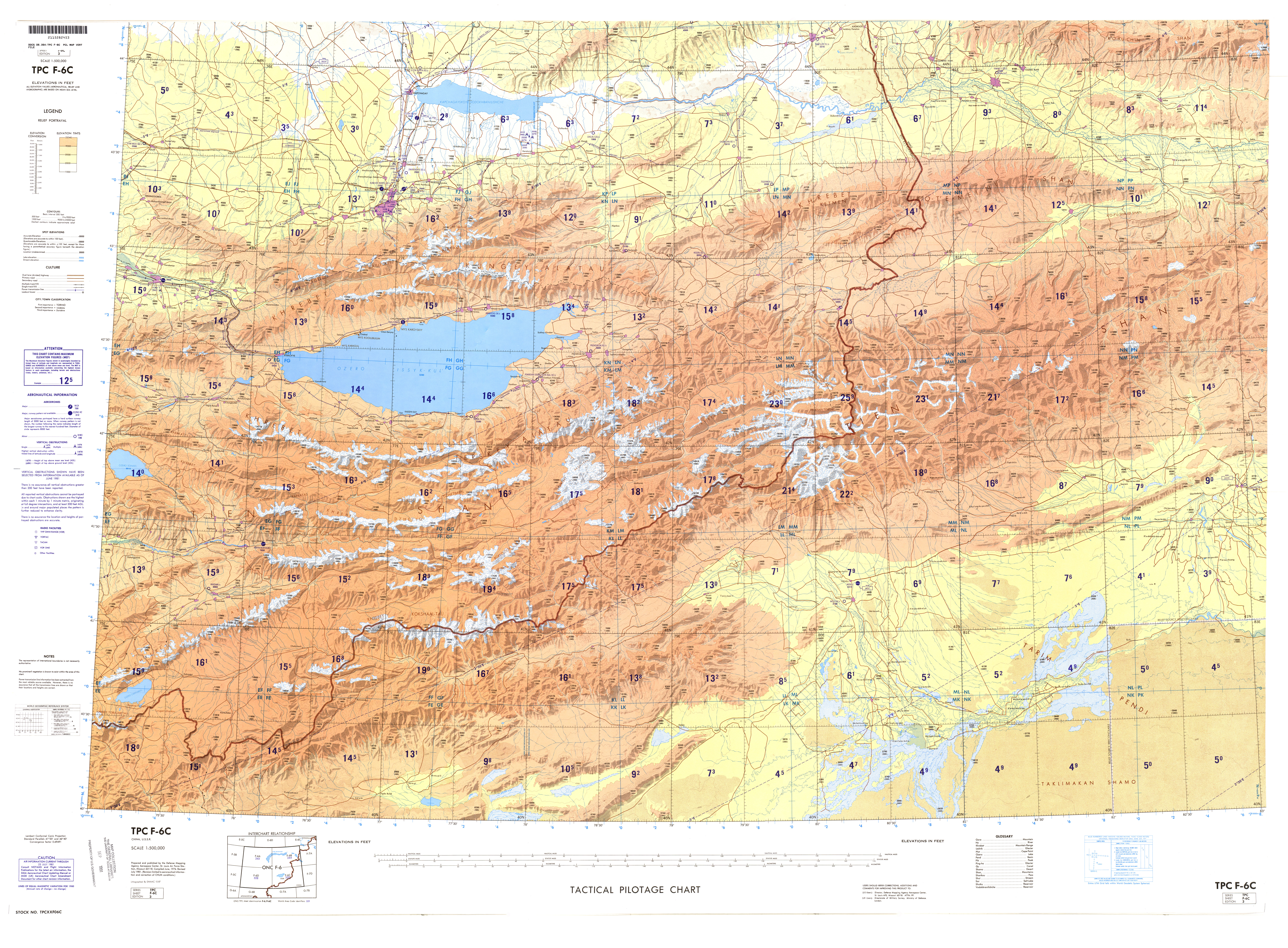

== See also ==
- China–Kyrgyzstan border
