= Jeti-Ögüz District =

Jeti-Ögüz Жети-Өгүз району
- District
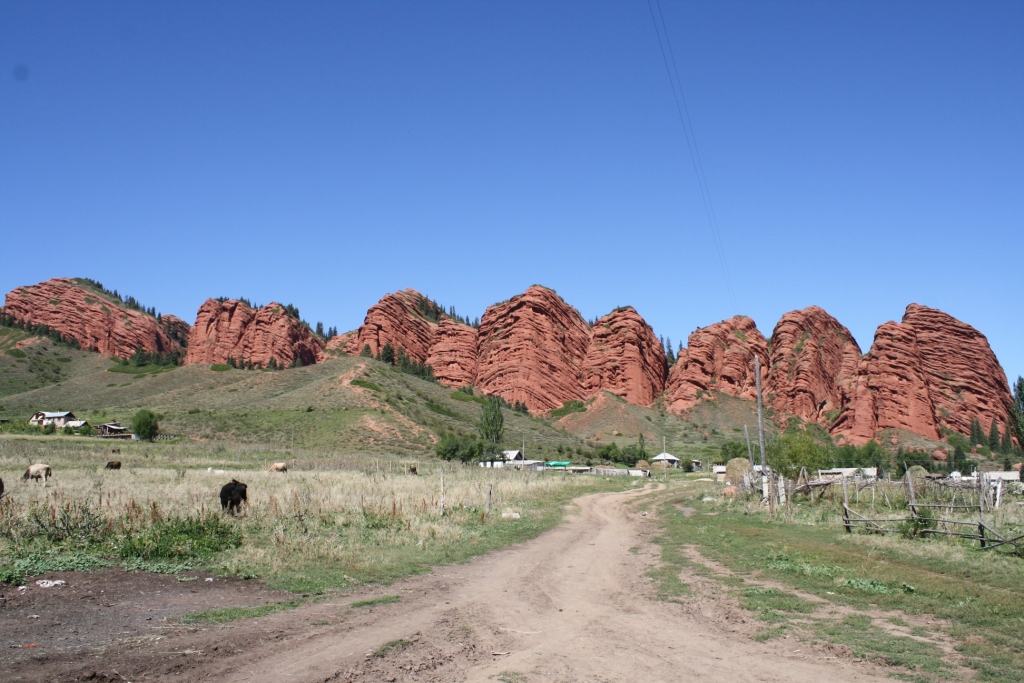
- The Jeti-Ögüz rock formation from which Jeti-Ögüz District gets its name, and near-by resort.

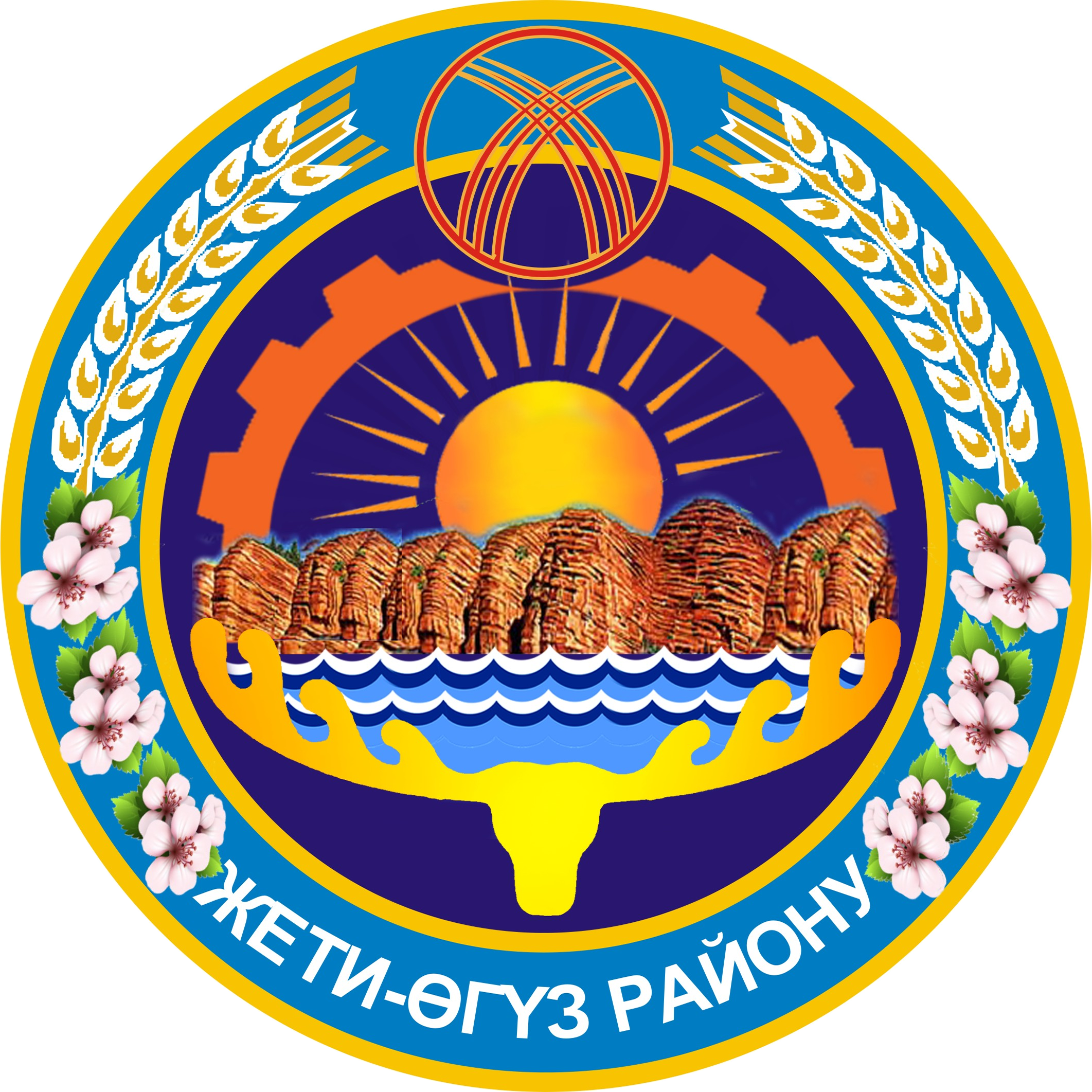
- Flag Coat of arms

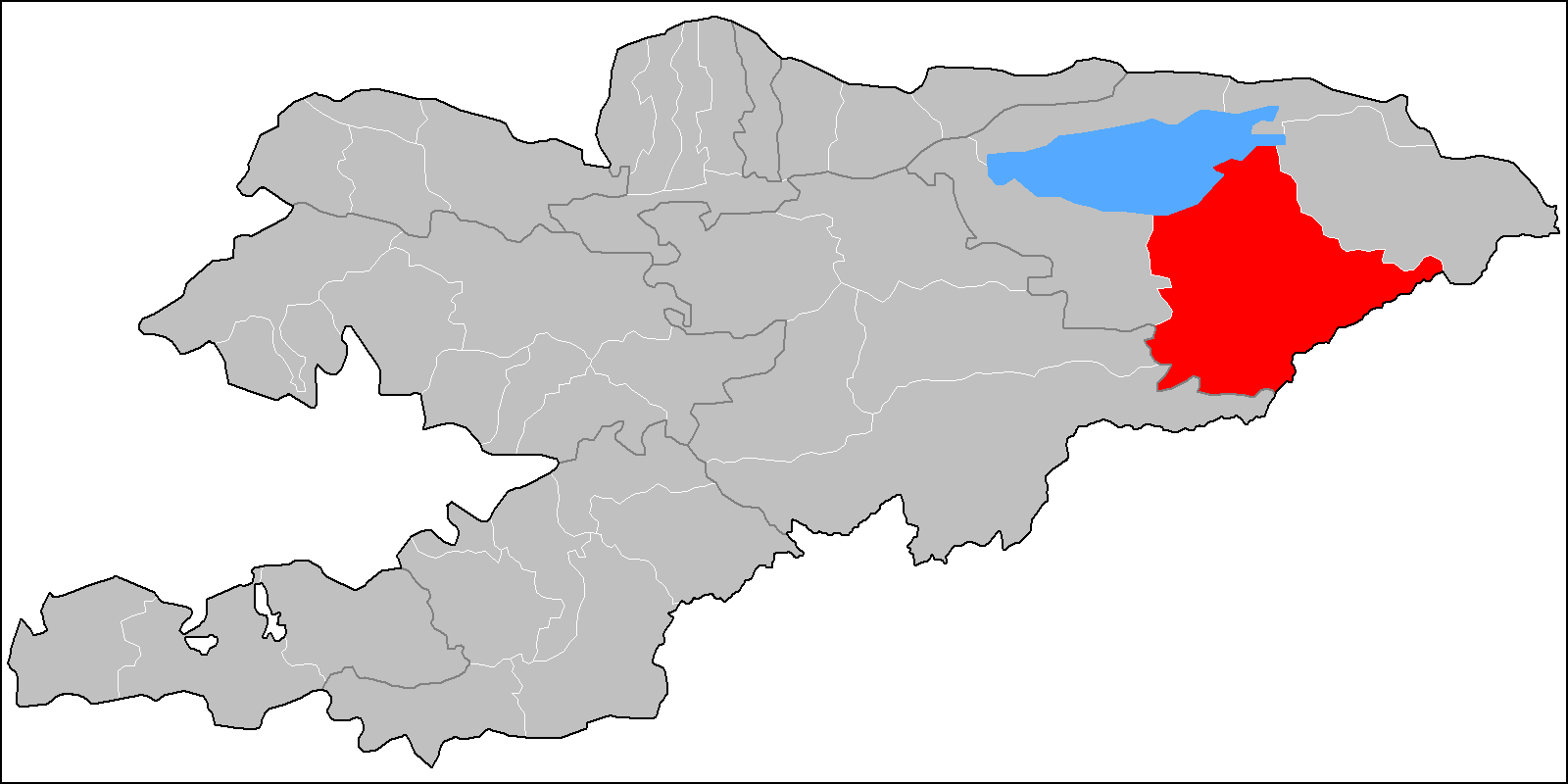
- Coordinates: 42°20′N 78°00′E
- Country: Kyrgyzstan
- Region: Issyk-Kul

Area
  - Total: 14,499 km^{2} (5,598 sq mi)

Population (2023)
  - Total: 99,690
  - Density: 6.876/km^{2} (17.81/sq mi)
- Time zone: UTC+6

Jeti-Ögüz (Kyrgyz: Жети-Өгүз, IPA: [dʒeti œɣýz]; lit. 'Seven Bulls') is a district of Issyk-Kul Region in north-eastern Kyrgyzstan. Its seat lies at Kyzyl-Suu. Its area is 14,499 square kilometres (5,598 sq mi), and its resident population was 93,392 in 2021. It comprises much of the eastern end of the Terskey Ala-Too Range.

== Geography ==
The Terskey Alatau, Ak-Shiyrak Range, Borkoldoy Too, Jetim-Bel Range, and Kakshaal Too spread across the Jeti-Ögüz District. Major valleys include Issyk-Kul Valley, Upper Naryn Valley, Ak-Shiyrak Valley, and so on. The district contains deposits of ores of tin, tungsten, copper and other metals. Among its large rivers are the Naryn, Saryjaz, Barskoon, Jeti-Ögüz, etc.

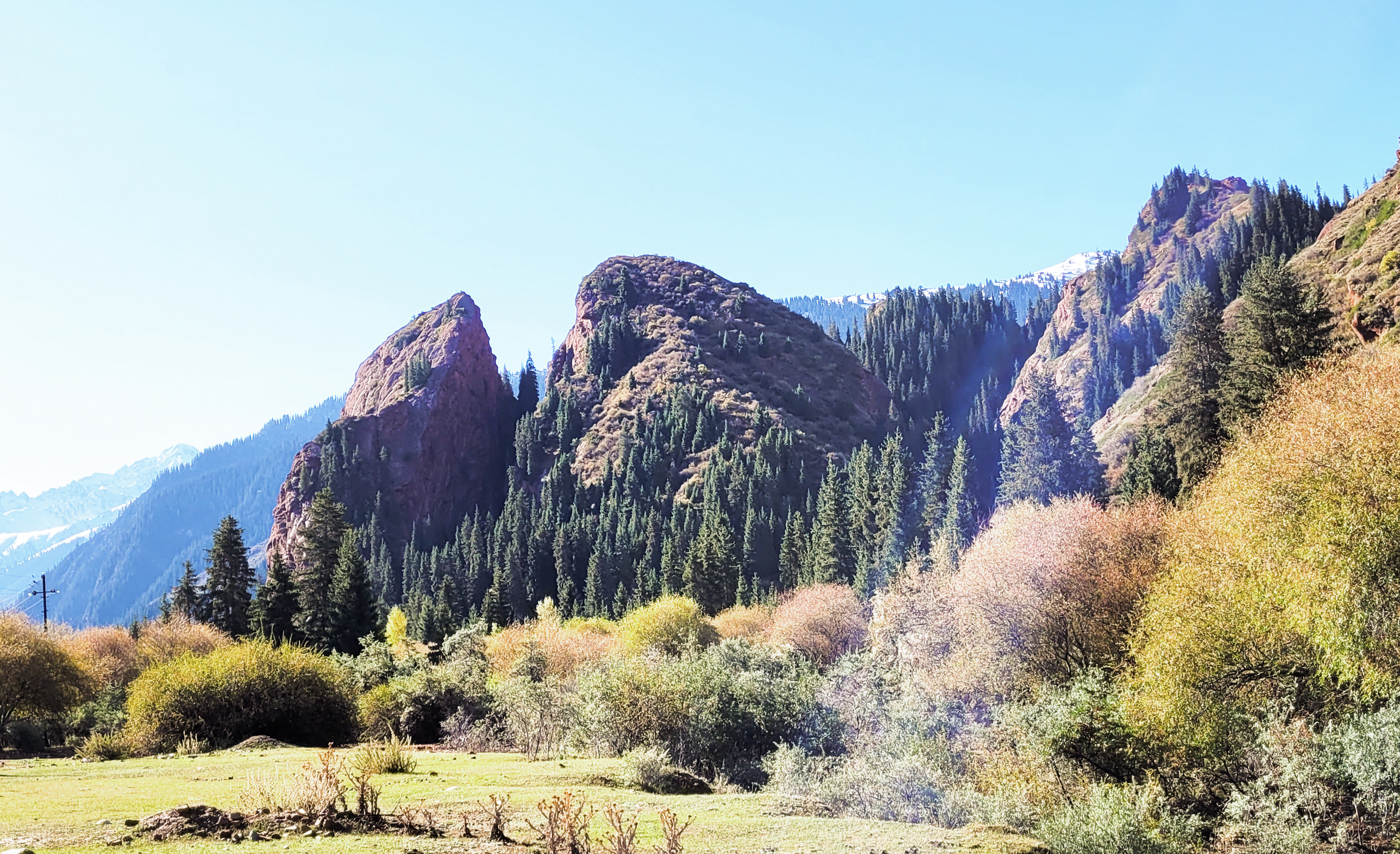
Broken Heart Rock

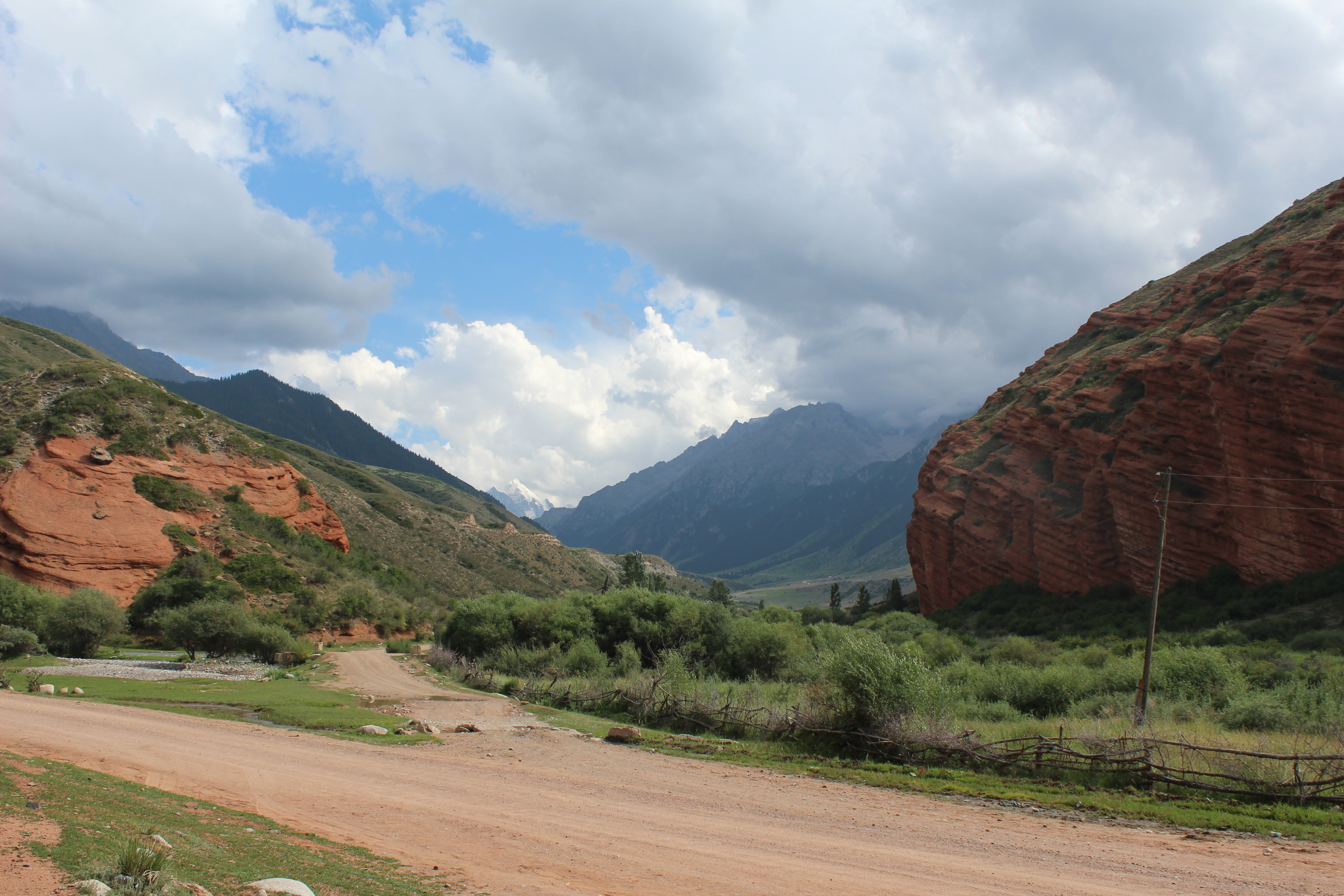
Near the end of Juuku Gorge

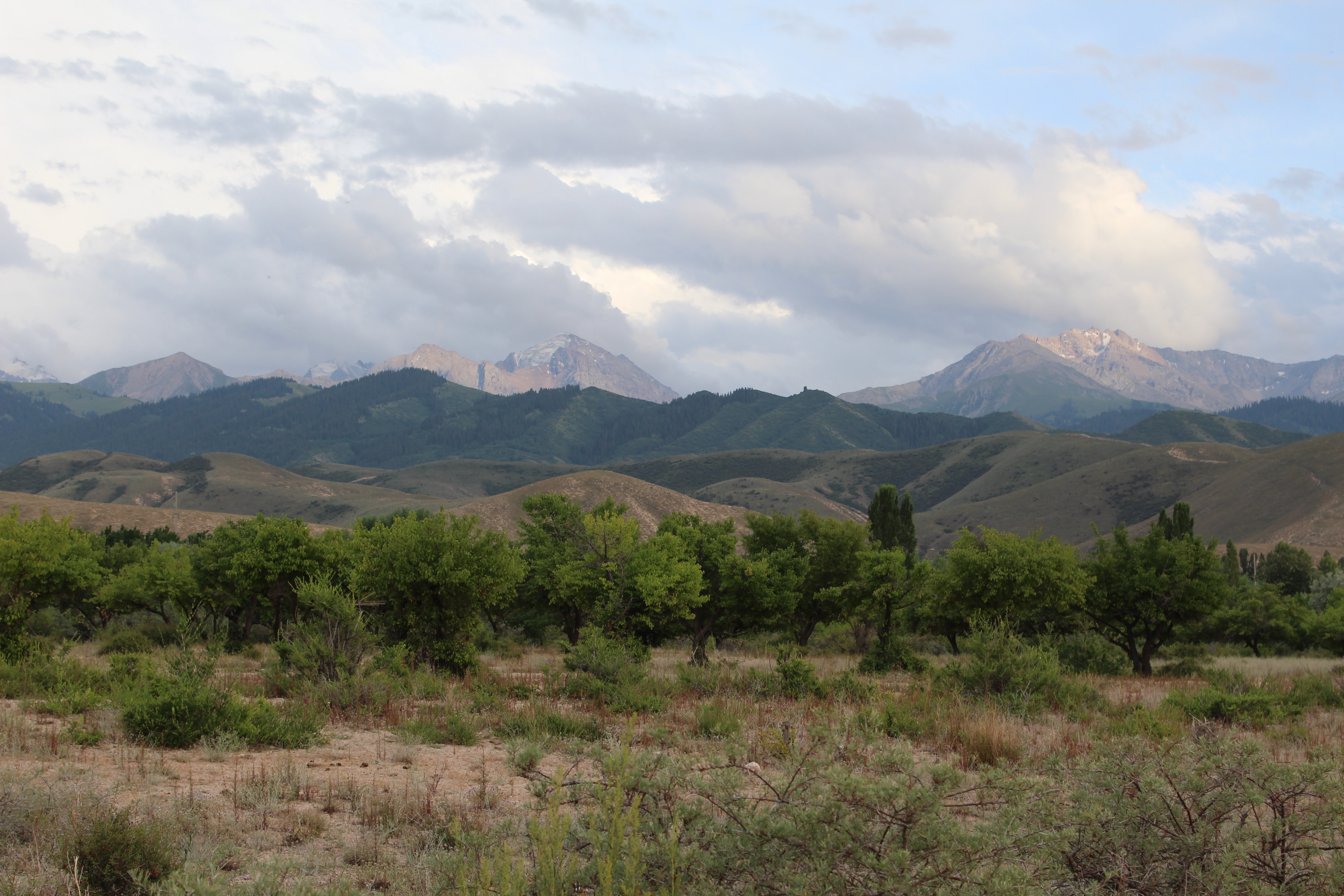
The Teskey Ala-Too range as seen from the beach at Ak Terek

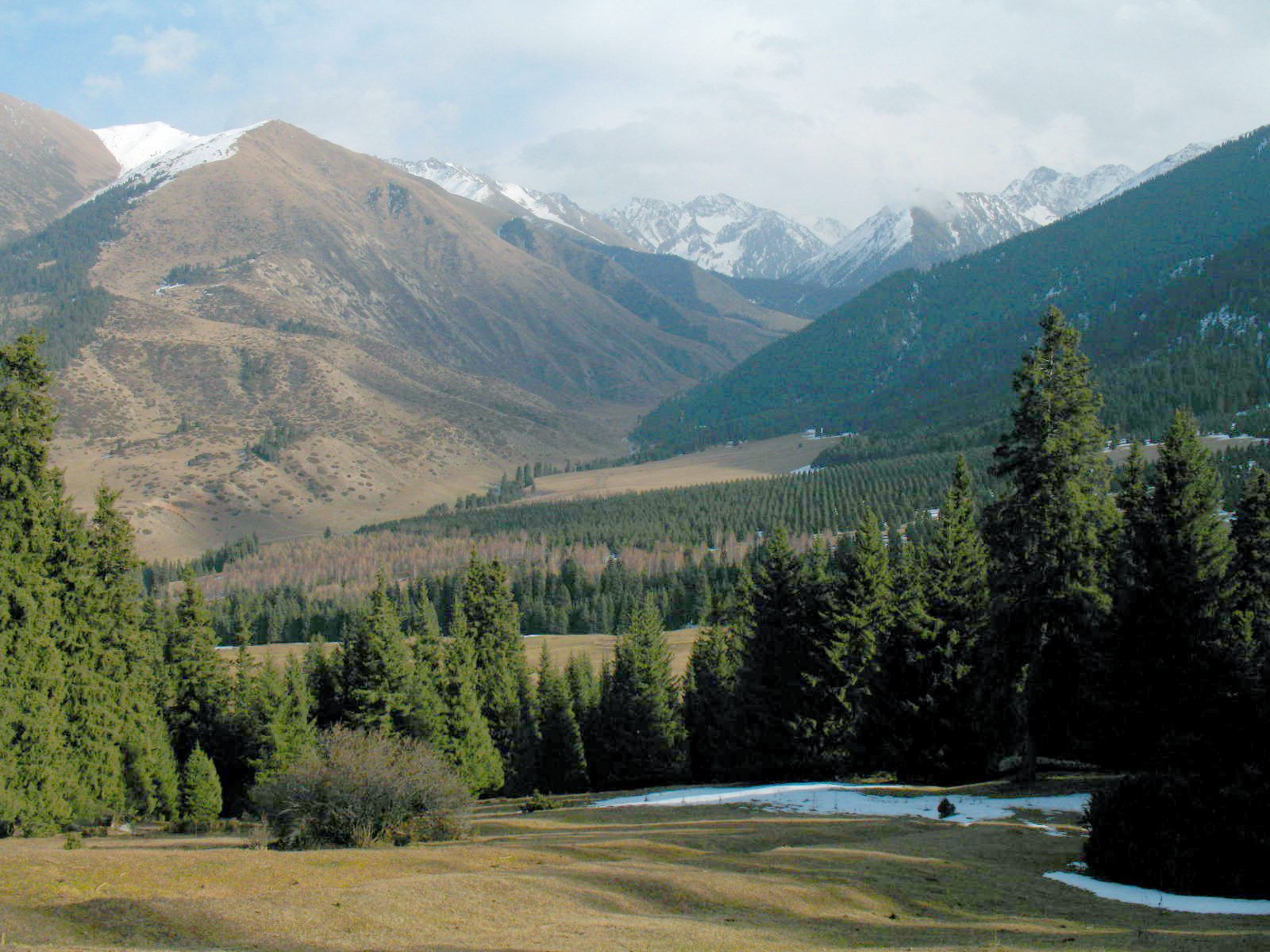
The mountains a bit south of Jeti Ögüz rock formation

== Population ==
Historical population
Year	Pop.	±% p.a.
1970	57,804	—
1979	61,121	+0.62%
1989	67,597	+1.01%
1999	74,414	+0.97%
2009	82,085	+0.99%
2021	93,392	+1.08%
Note: resident population; Sources:

== Rural communities and settlements ==
In total, Jeti-Ögüz District includes 47 villages located in 13 rural communities (ayyl aymagy). Each rural community may consist of one or several villages. The rural communities and settlements in the Jeti-Ögüz District are:

1. Ak-Döbö (seat: Munduz; incl. Ak-Döbö, Ang-Östön and Tilekmat)
2. Ak-Shyyrak (seat: Ak-Shyyrak; incl. Kulttsentr and Yshtyk)
3. Aldashev (seat: Saruu; incl. Juuku and Ysyk-Köl)
4. Barskoon (seat: Barskoon; incl. Karakol, Kara-Say and Söök)
5. Darkan (seat: Darkan)
6. Jargylchak (seat: Ak-Terek; incl. Jengish, Kichi-Jargylchak and Chong-Jargylchak)
7. Jeti-Ögüz (seat: Jeti-Ögüz; incl. Ak-Kochkor, Jele-Döbö, Jeti-Ögüz resort, Kabak, Taldy-Bulak and Chyrak)
8. Kyzyl-Suu (seat: Kyzyl-Suu; incl. Jalgyz-Örük, Kaynar and Pokrovka Pristany)
9. Lipenka (seat: Lipenka; incl. Bogatyrovka, Zelenyy Gay and Ichke-Bulung)
10. Orgochor (seat: Orgochor; incl. Boz-Beshik, Kurgak-Ayryk and Podgornoye)
11. Svetlaya Polyana (seat: Svetlaya Polyana; incl. Chong-Kyzyl-Suu)
12. Tamga (seat: Tamga; incl. Tosor)
13. Yrdyk (seat: Alkym; incl. Jon-Bulak, Komsomolskoye, Konkino and Yrdyk)
Settlements of the Jeti-Oguz District
Abbreviations: A - An-Osten, J - Jele-Debe
