= Tüp (river) =

Location
- Country: Kyrgyzstan

Physical characteristics
- Source: Teskey Ala-Too Range
- Mouth: Issyk-Kul
  - coordinates: 42.7418°N 78.3053°E
- Length: 120 km (75 mi)
- Basin size: 1,180 km^{2} (460 sq mi)
- Discharge
  - average: 10.6 m^{3}/s (370 cu ft/s)

The Tüp (Kyrgyz: Түп [tʰʉp]; Russian: Тюп [tʲʉp]) is a river in Tüp District and Ak-Suu District of Issyk-Kul Region of Kyrgyzstan. It rises on north slopes of Teskey Ala-Too Range, takes in several tributaries from the Kungey Alatau and flows into lake Issyk-Kul. With its length of 120 km (75 mi) the Tüp is the longest river of the Issyk-Kul basin. The basin area is 1,180 square kilometres (460 sq mi), the second largest of the rivers entering Issyk-Kul.

== Tributaries ==
Major tributaries include: Shaty, Kööchü, Taldysuu, Korumdu, Tabylgyty, and others. To irrigate agricultural lands in the valley, six canals have been built with a total discharge capacity of 3.80 m³/sec.

== Course and Flow ==
Originating on the northern slope of the Teskey Ala-Too range, the river flows north through a narrow gorge, then turns westward from the village of San-Tash into a wider valley, eventually flowing into the Tüp Bay of Lake Issyk-Kul.

The river starts rising in April and recedes by September. Around 55% of its annual flow occurs in April and May. The average annual discharge is 10.6 m³/sec, with a maximum of 123 m³/sec and a minimum of 1.41 m³/sec. The river is fed by snow, rain, glaciers, and springs. Average sediment concentration is 250 g/m³, with 88% of sediment transport occurring in the spring.

== Lakes ==
There are 28 lakes within the basin with a total area of 2.67 km².

== Settlements ==
Villages along river banks include San-Tash, Sary-Tologoy, Tüp, Toktoyan, and others.
