= Tüp Game Reserve =

- IUCN category IV (habitat/species management area)
- Location within Kyrgyzstan
- Location: Kyrgyzstan
- Nearest city: Karakol
- Coordinates: 42°38′N 79°10′E
- Area: 15,000 ha (37,000 acres)
- Established: 1976

Tüp Game Reserve (Kyrgyz: Түп зоологиялык (аң уулоочу) заказниги) is a protected area in Tüp District of Issyk-Kul Region of Kyrgyzstan. It is situated on the north side of the Teskey Alatoo mountain range, in the basin of the rivers Tüp and Karkyra. Its purpose is to protect roe deer, boar, and Cervus elaphus. Established in 1976, the reserve occupies 15,000 hectares.

== Fauna ==
Mountain meadows and rock outcrops are inhabited by Central Asiatic frog, European green toad, Dione rat snake, Asymblepharus alaicus, Gloydius, narrow-skulled vole, silver mountain vole, shrew, chukar partridge, Daurian partridge, common quail, rock pigeon, etc.
