= Kyrgyz literature =

The history of Kyrgyz literature dates to the early 19th century, from the poems of Moldo Nïyaz to stories written in "Old Kyrgyz". It is an important facet of the culture of Kyrgyzstan. Kyrgyz literature is not only written, but also spoken, and passed down from generation to generation. Much of the literature in Kyrgyzstan is poetry.

== Notable works and authors ==
=== Famous works ===
- The Epic of Manas, originally called Манас дастаны
- Kojojash, a lesser epic poem
- The Day Lasts More Than a Hundred Years

=== Famous authors ===
- Chinghiz Aitmatov
- Kasymaly Jantöshev
- Jolon Mamytov, famous for his love poems
- Alykul Osmonov
- Tugolbay Sydykbekov, the first person to receive the title, Hero of the Kyrgyz Republic
- Aaly Tokombaev
- Kasym Tynystanov
- Tologon Kasymbek
- Mukay Elebay (wrote the first novel in Kyrgyz, "The Long Road")
- Saken Omur
- Kasymaly Bayaly uulu

== See also ==
- Russian literature
- Soviet literature
