= Bayzak, Tüp =

Bayzak Kyrgyz: Байзак
- Location within Kyrgyzstan
- Coordinates: 42°45′13″N 78°41′45″E
- Country: Kyrgyzstan
- Region: Issyk-Kul Region
- District: Tüp District

Population (2021)
  - Total: 1,770
- Time zone: UTC+6

Bayzak (Kyrgyz: Байзак, Kara-Chunkur until July 2007) is a village in the Issyk-Kul Region of Kyrgyzstan. It is part of the Tüp District. The population of the village was 1770 in 2021. It is located along the highway of international significance ЭМ-08 (as per the national road classification) connecting Tüp - Sary-Tologoy - border of Kazakhstan.
