= Mukay Elebayev =

Early Kyrgyz author (1906–1944)

- Born: 15 January 1906; Chong Tash, Semirechye Oblast, Russian Turkestan
- Died: 15 May 1944 (aged 38); Pskov Oblast, Soviet Union
- Occupations: poet, writer
- Spouse: Fuxura
- Writing career
- Genres: novels, short stories, poems
- Notable work: The Long Road

Mukay Elebayev (15 January 1906 - 15 May 1944) was a Kyrgyz poet and author born in Chong Tash village, Semirechye Oblast, Russian Turkestan in what is now the Tüp District of Issyk-Kul Region, Kyrgyzstan on 15 January 1906. Left orphaned at age nine, he fled to China in 1916 during the Urkun, returning in 1919.

His autobiographical novel, "The Long Road", was published in 1936. It describes his growing up, escape to China, and return. It is considered to be the first novel in the Kyrgyz language.

In 1943 he was drafted into the Soviet army and killed during World War II in Russia in 1944.

== Works ==
- Uzak jol: novel (The Long Road), Frunze: Kyrgyzmambas, 1936.
- Kıyın kezeŋ: stories (Hard Times), Frunze: Kyrgyzmambas, 1938.
- Salam kat: poems, (Letter of Greeting) Frunze: Kyrgyzmambas, 1938.
