= Toguz-Bulak =

Toguz-Bulak may refer to the following places in Kyrgyzstan:

- Toguz-Bulak, Leylek - a village in Leylek District, Batken Region
- Toguz-Bulak, Chuy - a village in Ysyk-Ata District of Chuy Region
- Toguz-Bulak, Tüp - a village in Tüp District of Issyk-Kul Region
- Toguz-Bulak, Tong - a village in Tong District of Issyk-Kul Region
- Toguz-Bulak, Alay - a village in Alay District of Osh Region
- Toguz-Bulak, Kara-Kulja - a village in Kara-Kulja District of Osh Region
- Toguz-Bulak, Kara-Suu - a village in Kara-Suu District of Osh Region
