= Frunzenskoe, Tüp =

Frunzenskoe Kyrgyz: Фрунзе, Russian: Фрунзенское
- Location within Kyrgyzstan
- Coordinates: 42°45′59″N 78°11′12″E
- Country: Kyrgyzstan
- Region: Issyk-Kul Region
- District: Tüp District

Population (2021)
  - Total: 974
- Time zone: UTC+6

Frunzenskoe (Kyrgyz: Фрунзе, Russian: Фрунзенское) is a village in the Issyk-Kul Region of Kyrgyzstan. It is part of the Tüp District. The population of the village was 974 in 2021. It is located along the highway of international significance ЭМ-09 (as per the national road classification) connecting Balykchy - Anan'yevo - Karakol.
