= Shaty =

Shaty Kyrgyz: Шаты
- Location within Kyrgyzstan
- Coordinates: 42°47′02″N 78°22′53″E
- Country: Kyrgyzstan
- Region: Issyk-Kul Region
- District: Tüp District
- Elevation: 1,657 m (5,436 ft)

Population (2021)
  - Total: 1,745
- Time zone: UTC+6

Shaty is a village in the Tüp District of Issyk-Kul Region of Kyrgyzstan. Its population was 1,745 in 2021.
