= Sary-Döbö =

Sary-Döbö Kyrgyz: Сары-Дөбө
- Location within Kyrgyzstan
- Coordinates: 42°45′0″N 78°24′0″E
- Country: Kyrgyzstan
- Region: Issyk-Kul Region
- District: Tüp District
- Elevation: 1,633 m (5,358 ft)

Population (2021)
  - Total: 1,967
- Time zone: UTC+6

Sary-Döbö is a village in the Issyk-Kul Region of Kyrgyzstan. It is part of the Tüp District. Its population was 1,967 in 2021.
