= Ak-Bulung, Tüp =

Ak-Bulung Kyrgyz: Ак-Булуң
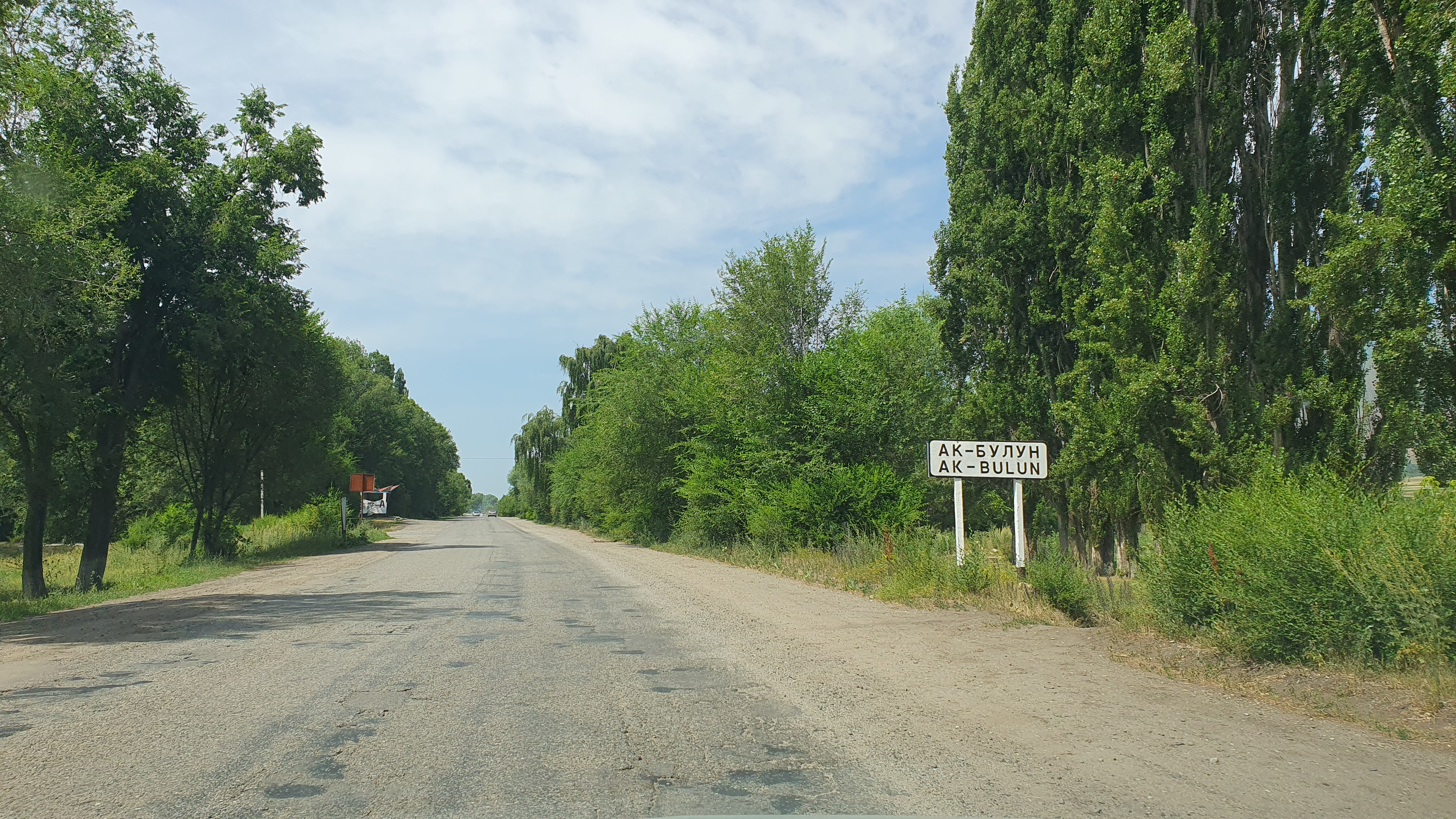

- Location within Kyrgyzstan
- Coordinates: 42°45′58″N 78°13′37″E
- Country: Kyrgyzstan
- Region: Issyk-Kul Region
- District: Tüp District

Population (2021)
  - Total: 531
- Time zone: UTC+6

Ak-Bulung (Kyrgyz: Ак-Булуң) is a village in the Issyk-Kul Region of Kyrgyzstan. It is part of the Tüp District. The population of the village was 531 in 2021.
