= Ichke-Suu, Tüp =

Ichke-Suu Kyrgyz: Ичке-Суу
- Location within Kyrgyzstan
- Coordinates: 42°46′56″N 78°25′37″E
- Country: Kyrgyzstan
- Region: Issyk-Kul Region
- District: Tüp District

Population (2021)
  - Total: 1,537
- Time zone: UTC+6

Ichke-Suu (Kyrgyz: Ичке-Суу) is a village in the Issyk-Kul Region of Kyrgyzstan. It is part of the Tüp District. The population of the village was 1,537 in 2021.
