= Aral, Issyk Kul =

Aral Kyrgyz: Арал
- Location within Kyrgyzstan
- Coordinates: 42°43′N 78°37′E
- Country: Kyrgyzstan
- Region: Issyk-Kul Region
- District: Tüp District
- Elevation: 1,661 m (5,449 ft)

Population (2021)
  - Total: 1,979
- Time zone: UTC+6

Aral is a village in the Issyk-Kul Region of Kyrgyzstan. It is part of the Tüp District. Its population was 1,979 in 2021.
