= Oy-Bulak =

Oy-Bulak Kyrgyz: Ой-Булак
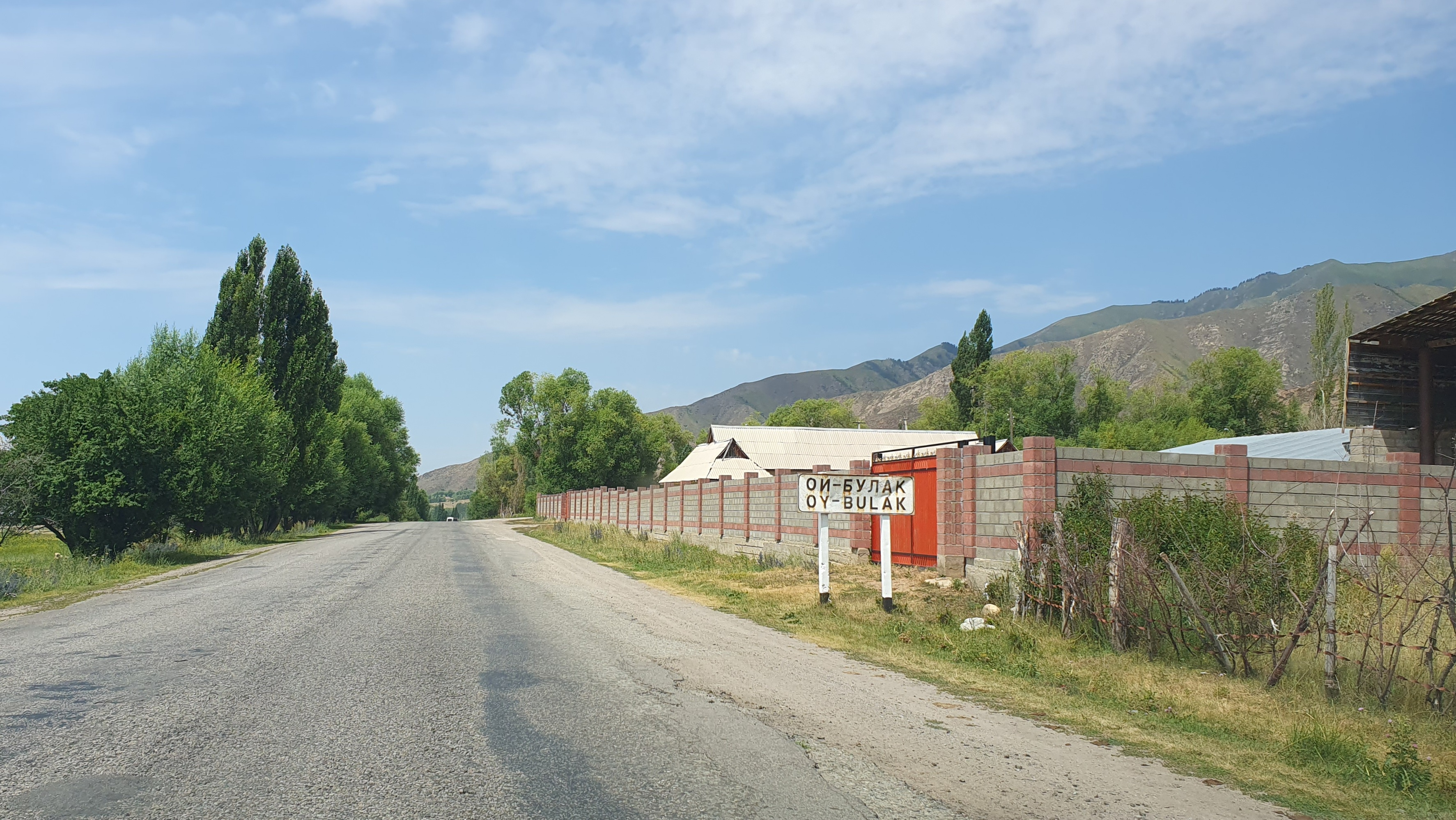

- Location within Kyrgyzstan
- Coordinates: 42°44′53″N 78°05′28″E
- Country: Kyrgyzstan
- Region: Issyk-Kul Region
- District: Tüp District

Population (2021)
  - Total: 1,057
- Time zone: UTC+6

Oy-Bulak (Kyrgyz: Ой-Булак) is a village in the Issyk-Kul Region of Kyrgyzstan. It is part of the Tüp District. The population of the village was 1,057 in 2021.
