= Kichi-Örüktü =

Kichi-Örüktü Kyrgyz: Кичи-Өрүктү
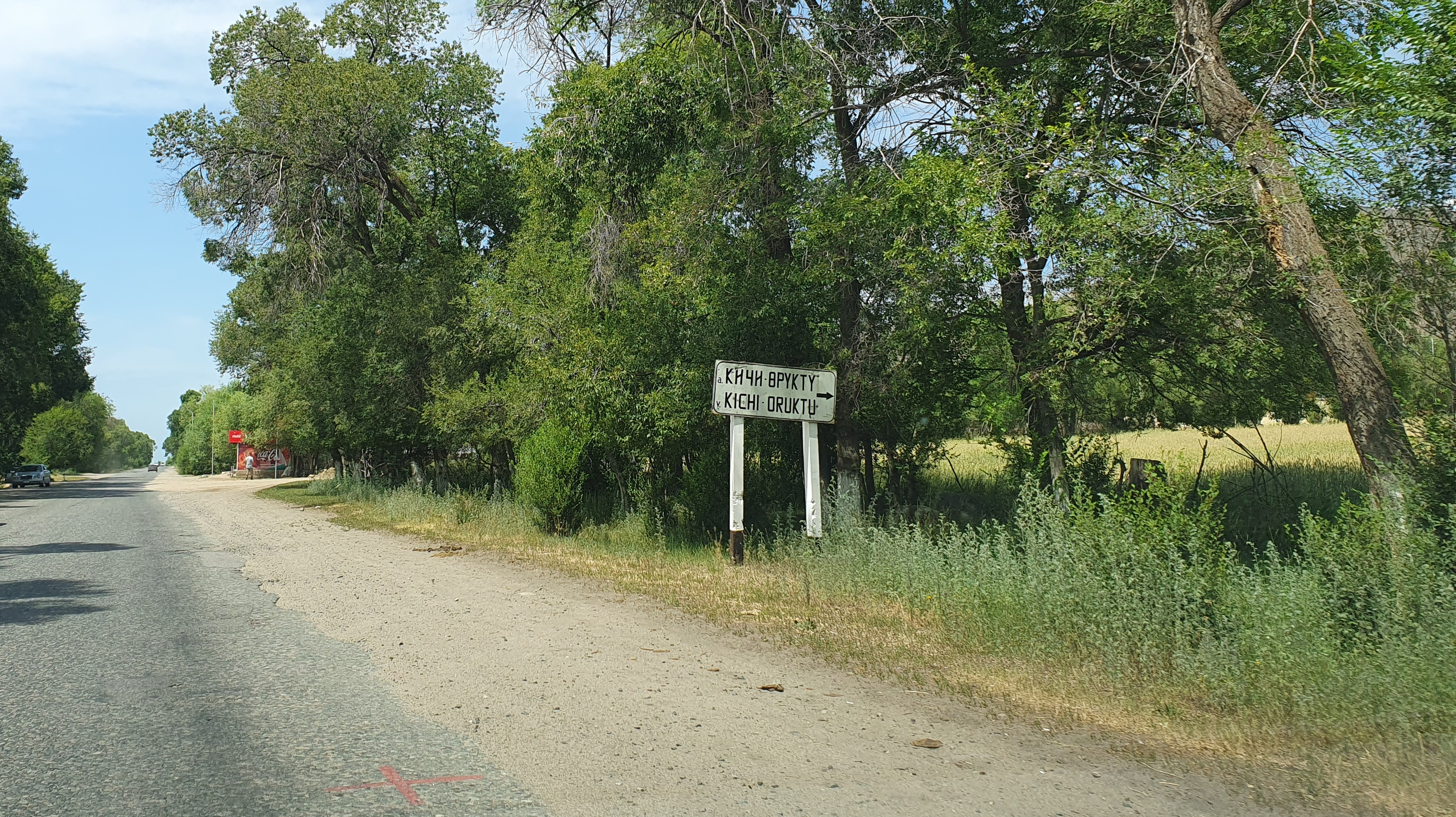

- Location within Kyrgyzstan
- Coordinates: 42°43′48″N 77°55′48″E
- Country: Kyrgyzstan
- Region: Issyk-Kul Region
- District: Tüp District
- Elevation: 1,669 m (5,476 ft)

Population (2021)
  - Total: 1,818
- Time zone: UTC+6

Kichi-Örüktü is a village in the Issyk-Kul Region of Kyrgyzstan. It is part of the Tüp District. Its population was 1,818 in 2021.
