= Oy-Tal =

Oy-Tal may refer to the following places in Kyrgyzstan

- Oy-Tal, Issyk-Kul, a village in Tüp District, Issyk-Kul Region
- Oy-Tal, Osh, a village in Kara-Kulja District, Osh Region
