= Kürmöntü =

Kürmöntü Kyrgyz: Күрмөнтү
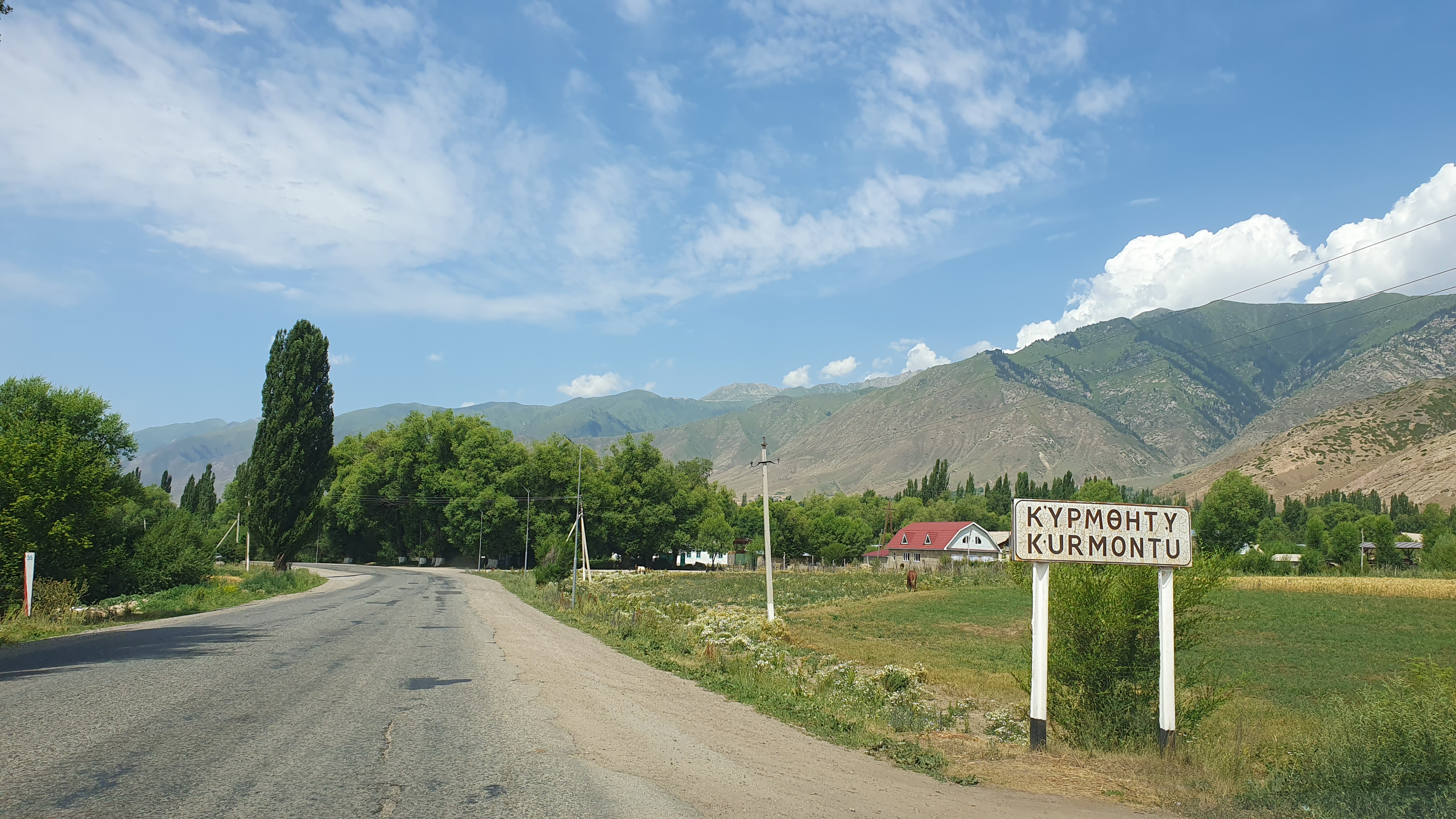

- Location within Kyrgyzstan
- Coordinates: 42°46′48″N 78°15′0″E
- Country: Kyrgyzstan
- Region: Issyk-Kul Region
- District: Tüp District
- Elevation: 1,641 m (5,384 ft)

Population (2021)
  - Total: 3,396
- Time zone: UTC+6

Kürmöntü is a village in the Issyk-Kul Region of Kyrgyzstan. It is part of the Tüp District. Its population was 3,396 in 2021.
