= Jyluu-Bulak =

Jyluu-Bulak Kyrgyz: Жылуу-Булак
- Location within Kyrgyzstan
- Coordinates: 42°45′49″N 78°39′20″E
- Country: Kyrgyzstan
- Region: Issyk-Kul Region
- District: Tüp District
- Elevation: 1,740 m (5,710 ft)

Population (2021)
  - Total: 1,819
- Time zone: UTC+6

Jyluu-Bulak is a village in the Tüp District of Issyk-Kul Region of Kyrgyzstan. Its population was 1,819 in 2021.
