= San-Tash =

San-Tash Kyrgyz: Сан-Таш
- Location within Kyrgyzstan
- Coordinates: 42°45′12″N 78°59′41″E
- Country: Kyrgyzstan
- Region: Issyk-Kul Region
- District: Tüp District

Population (2021)
  - Total: 182
- Time zone: UTC+6

San-Tash (Kyrgyz: Сан-Таш) is a village in the Issyk-Kul Region of Kyrgyzstan. It is part of the Tüp District. The population of the village was 182 in 2021. It is located near highway of international significance ЭМ-08 (as per the national road classification) connecting Tüp - Sary-Tologoy - Border of Kazakhstan.
