= Kuturgu =

Kuturgu Kyrgyz: Кутургу
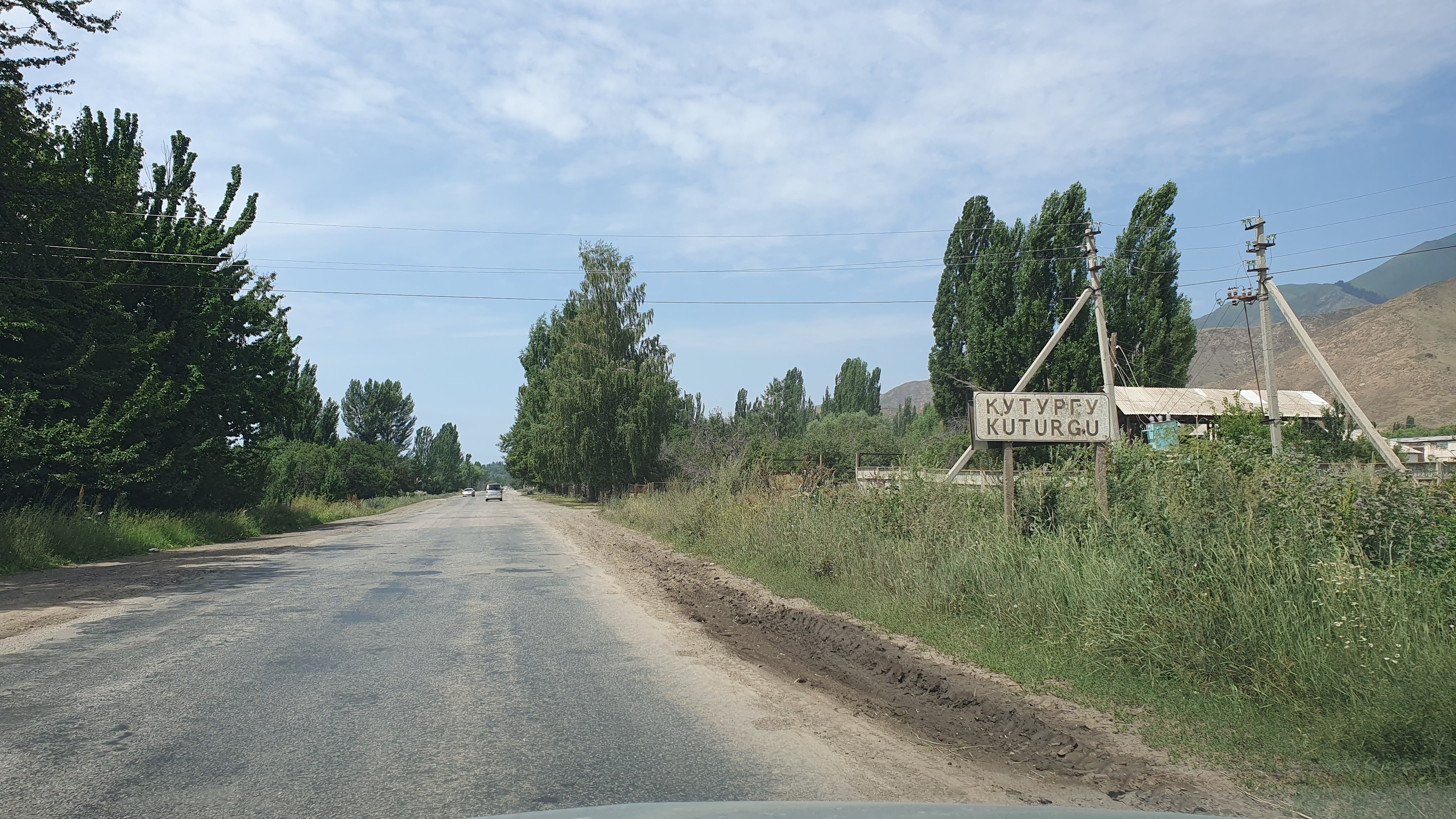

- Location within Kyrgyzstan
- Coordinates: 42°45′0″N 78°6′36″E
- Country: Kyrgyzstan
- Region: Issyk-Kul Region
- District: Tüp District
- Elevation: 1,669 m (5,476 ft)

Population (2021)
  - Total: 2,172
- Time zone: UTC+6

Kuturgu is a village in the Issyk-Kul Region of Kyrgyzstan. It is part of the Tüp District. Its population was 2,172 in 2021.
