= Korumdu, Tüp =

Korumdu Kyrgyz: Корумду
- Location within Kyrgyzstan
- Coordinates: 42°46′58″N 78°33′57″E
- Country: Kyrgyzstan
- Region: Issyk-Kul Region
- District: Tüp District
- Elevation: 1,730 m (5,680 ft)

Population (2021)
  - Total: 2,145
- Time zone: UTC+6

Korumdu is a village in the Tüp District of Issyk-Kul Region of Kyrgyzstan. Its population was 2,145 in 2021.
