= Chong-Toguz-Bay =

Chong-Toguz-Bay Kyrgyz: Чоң-Тогуз-Бай
- Location within Kyrgyzstan
- Coordinates: 42°43′N 78°37′E
- Country: Kyrgyzstan
- Region: Issyk-Kul Region
- District: Tüp District
- Elevation: 1,664 m (5,459 ft)

Population (2021)
  - Total: 1,188
- Time zone: UTC+6

Chong-Toguz-Bay (Kyrgyz: Чоң-Тогуз-Бай) is a village in the Issyk-Kul Region of Kyrgyzstan. It is part of the Tüp District. Its population was 1,188 in 2021.
