= Taldy-Suu =

Taldy-Suu may refer to the following places in Kyrgyzstan:

- Taldy-Suu, Issyk Kul, a village in Tüp District, Issyk-Kul Region
- Taldy-Suu, Naryn, a village in At-Bashy District, Naryn Region
- Taldy-Suu, Osh, a village in Alay District, Osh Region
