= Batysh Salieva =

Batysh Salieva (1 July 1922 – 6 August 2015) was a Soviet-Kyrgyzstani politician and a member of the CPSU.

== Biography ==
She was born in 1922 in the village of Taldy-Suu in a mixed Kyrgyz-Russian family to Anastasia Dmitrievna Kalugina and Saaly Arboto.

From 1941 to 1943, she was active in political, social and economical work of the Kirghiz SSR. Between 1941 and 1943 she was a pioneer teacher, afterwards she took the role of the secretary of the Özgön District committee of the All-Union Communist Party of Bolsheviks in Osh Region. In 1943 she was appointed the first secretary of the Taldy-Suu district committee of the Komsomol. In 1944 she became head of the department for women's labour of the Taldy-Suu district committee of the Communist Party of Kyrgyzstan, then she held the same position in the Naryn regional committee of the Communist Party of Kyrgyzstan.

In 1952 she graduated from the Higher Party School in Moscow, and between 1952 and 1953 she worked as an instructor of the department of party cadres of the CPSU Central Committee in Moscow.

Between 1953–1966 and 1973–1985 she was a Minister of Social Security of the Kirghiz SSR. In 1966–1973 she was the head of the Republican Council of Trade Unions.

Elected deputy of the Supreme Soviet of the Soviet Union of the 7th and 8th convocations, she headed the commission on health care and social security of the Council of Nationalities of the Supreme Soviet of the Soviet Union. Was elected as a deputy of the Supreme Soviet of the Kyrgyz SSR of the 4th, 5th, 6th, 9th, and 10th convocations.

She died on August 6, 2015. She was buried in Bishkek on August 8.

== Awards ==
- Two Orders of the Red Banner of Labour
- USSR medals
- Certificates of honor from the Supreme Soviet of the Kyrgyz SSR, the Supreme Soviet of the USSR, the All-Union Central Council of Trade Unions, and the Committee of Soviet Women.
