= Tasma, Tüp =

Tasma Kyrgyz: Тасма
- Location within Kyrgyzstan
- Coordinates: 42°42′33″N 78°35′41″E
- Country: Kyrgyzstan
- Region: Issyk-Kul Region
- District: Tüp District

Population (2021)
  - Total: 1,951
- Time zone: UTC+6

Tasma (Kyrgyz: Тасма) is a village in the Issyk-Kul Region of Kyrgyzstan. It is part of the Tüp District. The population of the village was 1951 in 2021.
