= Belovodskoye, Tüp =

Belovodskoye Russian: Беловодское
- Location within Kyrgyzstan
- Coordinates: 42°46′44″N 78°12′48″E
- Country: Kyrgyzstan
- Region: Issyk-Kul Region
- District: Tüp District

Population (2021)
  - Total: 272
- Time zone: UTC+6

Belovodskoye (Russian: Беловодское) is a village in the Issyk-Kul Region of Kyrgyzstan. It is part of the Tüp District. The population of the village was 272 in 2021.
