= Kosh-Döbö, Tüp =

Kosh-Döbö Kyrgyz: Кош-Дөбө
- Location within Kyrgyzstan
- Coordinates: 42°42′06″N 78°31′03″E
- Country: Kyrgyzstan
- Region: Issyk-Kul Region
- District: Tüp District

Population (2021)
  - Total: 662
- Time zone: UTC+6

Kosh-Döbö (Kyrgyz: Кош-Дөбө) is a village in the Issyk-Kul Region of Kyrgyzstan. It is part of the Tüp District. The population of the village was 662 in 2021.
