= Sary-Bulung, Tüp =

Sary-Bulung Kyrgyz: Сары-Булуң
- Location within Kyrgyzstan
- Coordinates: 42°40′12″N 78°10′52″E
- Country: Kyrgyzstan
- Region: Issyk-Kul Region
- District: Tüp District

Population (2021)
  - Total: 820
- Time zone: UTC+6

Sary-Bulung (Kyrgyz: Сары-Булуң) is a village in the Issyk-Kul Region of Kyrgyzstan. It is part of the Tüp District. The population of the village was 820 in 2021.
