= Sart Kalmyk language =

Central Mongolic language

Sart Kalmyk
- Сарт хальмг келн Sart xalmg keln
- Native to: Kyrgyzstan
- Region: Issyk-Kul
- Ethnicity: c. 12,000 Sart Kalmyks
- Native speakers: 200
- Language family: Mongolic: Central Mongolic; Buryat–Mongolian; Mongolian; Oirat; Sart Kalmyk

Official status
- Official language in: Issyk-Kul Region

Language codes
- ISO 639-3: –
- Glottolog: sart1247
- IETF: xal-x-HIS11428

Sart Kalmyk (Oirat: Сарт хальмг келн, romanized: Sart xalmg keln) is an endangered and underdocumented Central Mongolic Oirat language variety spoken by the Sart Kalmyks in Ak-Suu District, Issyk-Kul Region, Kyrgyzstan.

== History ==
Sart Kalmyk emerged as a distinct variety after its speakers separated from a larger Oirat-speaking community in today's Xinjiang around 1864 and moved to the shores of Lake Issyk-Kul. Since then, the language has been developing in isolation from other Mongolic varieties and in intense contact with Kyrgyz, a Turkic language. Recent research shows a significant influence of Kyrgyz morphology, phonology and lexicon on Sart Kalmyk.

== Language situation ==
Sart Kalmyk is a severely threatened language. Its domains of use are largely confined to informal communication between the elderly in rural areas. Virtually all speakers are trilingual, having a good command of Kyrgyz and Russian in addition to their ethnic language. Younger members of the ethnic community often speak little to no Sart Kalmyk.

== Orthography ==
Historically, Sart Kalmyk was written with the Clear script and, occasionally, a local version of the Arabic script. Both scripts have fallen out of use by the early 1940s. In 1934, a short-lived Latin alphabet-based orthography was introduced. Today, Sart Kalmyk is rarely used in writing, but when it is written, the Kalmyk version of Cyrillic is employed.
