= Birlik, Issyk Kul =

Birlik Kyrgyz: Бирлик
- Location within Kyrgyzstan
- Coordinates: 42°43′48″N 78°24′36″E
- Country: Kyrgyzstan
- Region: Issyk-Kul Region
- District: Tüp District
- Elevation: 1,625 m (5,331 ft)

Population (2021)
  - Total: 1,195
- Time zone: UTC+6

Birlik (Kyrgyz: Бирлик, formerly имени ВЧК - imeni VChK) is a village in the Issyk-Kul Region of Kyrgyzstan. It is part of the Tüp District. Its population was 1,195 in 2021.
