= Dolon, Issyk Kul =

Dolon Kyrgyz: Долон
- Location within Kyrgyzstan
- Coordinates: 42°42′0″N 78°27′0″E
- Country: Kyrgyzstan
- Region: Issyk-Kul Region
- District: Tüp District
- Elevation: 1,649 m (5,410 ft)

Population (2021)
  - Total: 1,220
- Time zone: UTC+6

Dolon is a village in the Issyk-Kul Region of Kyrgyzstan. It is part of the Tüp District. Its population was 1,220 in 2021.

== Climate ==
Climate data for Dolon (1991–2020)
Month	Jan	Feb	Mar	Apr	May	Jun	Jul	Aug	Sep	Oct	Nov	Dec	Year
Daily mean °C (°F)	−11.3 (11.7)	−9.8 (14.4)	−5.2 (22.6)	0.8 (33.4)	5.0 (41.0)	8.1 (46.6)	9.8 (49.6)	9.5 (49.1)	6.3 (43.3)	0.3 (32.5)	−5.3 (22.5)	−9.6 (14.7)	−0.1 (31.8)
Source: NOAA
