= Ak-Bulak, Tüp =

Ak-Bulak Kyrgyz: Ак-Булак
- Location within Kyrgyzstan
- Coordinates: 42°47′50″N 78°14′10″E
- Country: Kyrgyzstan
- Region: Issyk-Kul
- District: Tüp

Population (2021)
  - Total: 1,184
- Time zone: UTC+6

Ak-Bulak (Kyrgyz: Ак-Булак) is a village in the Issyk-Kul Region of Kyrgyzstan. It is part of the Tüp District. Its population was 1,184 in 2021. Until 2012 it was an urban-type settlement.

== Population ==
Historical population
Year	Pop.	±% p.a.
1970	1,209	—
1979	1,219	+0.09%
1989	1,295	+0.61%
1999	1,114	−1.49%
2009	1,062	−0.48%
2021	1,184	+0.91%
Note: resident population; Sources:
