= Ysyk-Köl, Tüp =

Ysyk-Köl Kyrgyz: Ысык-Көл
- Location within Kyrgyzstan
- Coordinates: 42°36′0″N 78°8′50″E
- Country: Kyrgyzstan
- Region: Issyk-Kul
- District: Tüp
- Elevation: 1,621 m (5,318 ft)

Population (2021)
  - Total: 1,803

Ysyk-Köl (Kyrgyz: Ысык-Көл) is a village in the Issyk-Kul Region of Kyrgyzstan. It is part of the Tüp District. Its population was 1,803 in 2021.
