= Balbay =

Balbay is a Turkish surname. Notable people with the surname include:

- Wantan Balbay, a player in Idaho
- Doğuş Balbay (born 1989), Turkish basketball player
- Mustafa Balbay (born 1960), Turkish journalist, writer, and politician

== See also ==
- Balbay, Kyrgyzstan
