= Kööchü =

Kööchü Kyrgyz: Көөчү
- Location within Kyrgyzstan
- Coordinates: 42°47′16″N 78°32′21″E
- Country: Kyrgyzstan
- Region: Issyk-Kul
- District: Tüp
- Elevation: 1,735 m (5,692 ft)

Population (2021)
  - Total: 2,211
- Time zone: UTC+6

Kööchü (Kyrgyz: Көөчү) is a village in the Tüp District of Issyk-Kul Region of Kyrgyzstan. Its population was 2,211 in 2021.
