= Yntymak, Tüp =

Yntymak Kyrgyz: Ынтымак
- Location within Kyrgyzstan
- Coordinates: 42°39′25″N 78°07′48″E
- Country: Kyrgyzstan
- Region: Issyk-Kul Region
- District: Tüp District

Population (2021)
  - Total: 678
- Time zone: UTC+6

Yntymak (Kyrgyz: Ынтымак) is a village in the Issyk-Kul Region of Kyrgyzstan. It is part of the Tüp District. The population of the village was 678 in 2021.
