= Ming-Bulak, Tüp =

Ming-Bulak Kyrgyz: Миң-Булак
- Location within Kyrgyzstan
- Coordinates: 42°43′38″N 78°30′51″E
- Country: Kyrgyzstan
- Region: Issyk-Kul Region
- District: Tüp District
- Elevation: 1,655 m (5,430 ft)

Population (2021)
  - Total: 820
- Time zone: UTC+6

Ming-Bulak is a village in the Tüp District of Issyk-Kul Region of Kyrgyzstan. Its population was 820 in 2021.
