= Tugolbay Sydykbekov =

Kyrgyzstani writer (1912-1997)

- Түгөлбай Сыдыкбек уулу
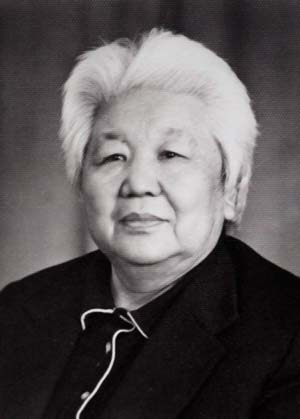
- Sydykbekov, 1985
- Born: 14 May 1912; Keng-Suu, Issyk-Kul Region, Russian Turkestan
- Died: 19 July 1997 (aged 85); Bishkek, Kyrgyz Republic
- Writing career
- Genres: novels, short stories
- Notable works: Broad River (Keŋ-Suu), People of Our Time (Bizdin zamandyn kişileri)

Tügölbay Sydykbekov (Kyrgyz: Түгөлбай Сыдыкбеков) (14 May 1912 – 19 July 1997) was a Kyrgyzstani writer, known as the "patriarch of Kyrgyz literature". He was awarded the honor of Hero of the Kyrgyz Republic in 1997.

== Biography ==
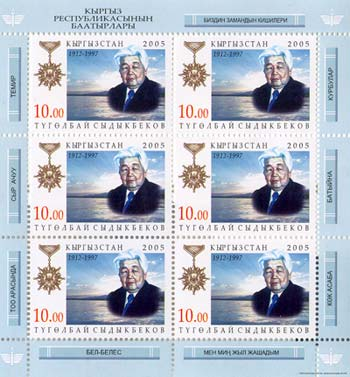
2005 stamp honoring Sydykbekov

Sydykbekov was born on 14 May 1912 in Keng-Suu, in the Issyk-Kul Region. His father died when he was three, and violence forced his family to seek refuge in the mountains when he was four. In 1918, the violence having subsided, his family returned but found their old way of life destroyed; his mother had to take a position with a farmer in Karakol. While they lived in poverty, Sydykbekov was able to get a Soviet education, which would serve him well in his writing career. In the 1920s, before the collectivization of the country, he was able to study veterinary medicine in Bishkek, an extraordinary opportunity for him as the child of an impoverished day laborer. When the country was collectivized, he was at university, but had contracted tuberculosis and was forced to spend time recuperating in sanatoriums on the lake and in Georgia. In his early stories he sang the praises of collectivization, which for many poor laborers (including his family) was a protection against oppression by landowners and other groups in power, a situation he knew very well.

Sydykbekov became known as one of the first Kyrgyz writers of prose, and he began by publishing uncontroversial texts. He wrote what has been called "the first Kyrgyz novel", Keng-Suu (1937–38, "Broad River", named for and set in the village that was the place of his birth). His best-known work is his third novel, Bizdin zamandyn kişileri ("People of our time"), written during and right after World War II. Less successful as a novel, it is noteworthy for its description of the encounter between intellectuals and Islam. During the war, Sydykbekov traveled throughout the region in order to describe daily life as accurately as possible, and in his novel sang the praises of the Kyrgyz population, who showed hospitality toward everyone, including widowed Russian women and orphaned Ukrainian children.

Aaly Tokombaev, among others, criticized the novel, whose main character, he said, relied all too easily on God and brought religious faith on an equal plane with socialism; he would not accept that this character was realistic at all: Sydykbekov, in effect, defied the tenets of socialist realism. Still, the novel won the Stalin Prize, 3rd class in 1949. Possibly, according to a recent historian, it was the result of a post-war effort to turn toward traditional culture (which included Islam in Kyrgyzstan), an effort that was appreciated in Sydykbekov's novel, since it simultaneously showed that the author identified with the Soviet Union.

In the debate over the Epic of Manas, whose status in the USSR of the early 1950s was controversial (the poem was condemned by Stalin's "propagandist in chief" Andrei Zhdanov as an example of "bourgeois cosmopolitanism"), Sydykbekov supported the poem, which, in a drastic shift, by 1952 was called anti-Soviet and anti-Chinese and condemned as pan-Islamic. In 1968, he was honored as People's Writer of the Kyrgyz Soviet Republic.

== Bibliography ==
- 1937–38: Keng-Suu (novel, "Broad River")
- 1946: Bizdin zamandyn kishileri (novel, "People of our time") ISBN 9789967331341
- 1945: Temir (novel) OCLC 1040945336
- 1950: Rasskazy OCLC 33369233
- 1955: Sredi gor (novel) OCLC 15564216
- 1966: Zhenshchiny OCLC 25449029
- 1969: Melodii starika (poetry) OCLC 20731306
- 1980: Ispovedʹ Bukentaĭ (novel) OCLC 9540848, Ymanbaĭ peĭili (novel) OCLC 15169455, and Ashuuda: Yrlar, dastandar OCLC 17334004
- 1986: Rovesniki (novel) OCLC 620117918
- 1988: Imanbaĭ Velikodushnyĭ : roman v novellakh ISBN 9785265000743 and Ku̇lku̇ zhana ȯmu̇r : povestter, angemeler OCLC 23286748
- 1990: Ömür tamyry : povestter zhana angemeler ISBN 9785660003318
- 1996: Bel-beles : roman-ėsse ISBN 9785655010734
