= Keng-Suu, Tüp =

Keng-Suu Kyrgyz: Кең-Суу
- Location within Kyrgyzstan
- Coordinates: 42°45′18″N 78°43′38″E
- Country: Kyrgyzstan
- Region: Issyk-Kul Region
- District: Tüp District
- Elevation: 1,800 m (5,900 ft)

Population (2021)
  - Total: 2,340
- Time zone: UTC+6

Keng-Suu (Kyrgyz: Кең-Суу) is a village in the Tüp District of Issyk-Kul Region of Kyrgyzstan. Its population was 2,340 in 2021.

The village is the birthplace of prominent Kyrgyz author Tugelbai Sydykbekov and current President of Kyrgyzstan Sadyr Japarov.
