= Anan'yevo =

Anan'yevo Ананьево
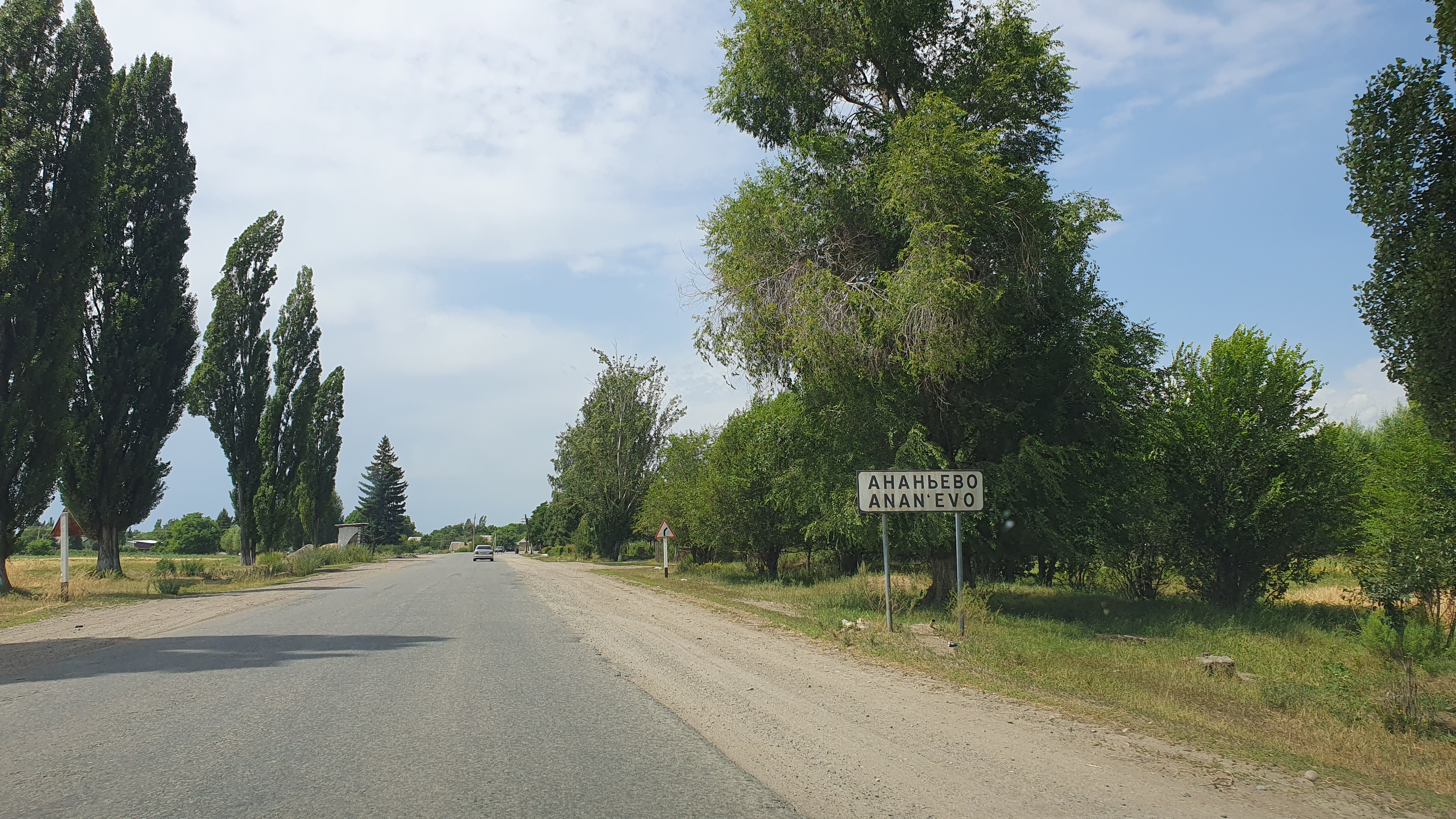

- Location within Kyrgyzstan
- Coordinates: 42°43′48″N 77°39′36″E
- Country: Kyrgyzstan
- Region: Issyk-Kul Region
- District: Issyk-Kul District
- Sazonovka: 1871
- Elevation: 1,644 m (5,394 ft)

Population (2023)
  - Total: 9,470
- Time zone: UTC+6

Anan'yevo (Russian: Ананьево; Kyrgyz: Ананьев) is a village in the Issyk-Kul Region of Kyrgyzstan. It is part of the Issyk-Kul District. Its population was 9,362 in 2021. Located on highway A363 on the north shore of Lake Issyk Kul, the next town to the west is Semyonovka, and to the east, Tüp. It was founded in 1871 as Sazonovka settlement and there is still a significant Russian population. In 1942, the village was renamed after one of the Panfilov's Twenty-Eight Guardsmen - Nikolay Yakovlevich Anan'yev, who was born in Sazonovka in 1912. There are a church and a mosque in the village.

== History ==
St. Matthew's burial site is reputedly on the shore of Issyk Kul (on Svetly Mys, "Bright Cape") near Anan'yevo.

Saint Matthew Legend: Note: this needs better sources, and I cannot find most of the places on a map and the geography is contradictory. According to Laurence Mitchell, 'Kyrgyzstan', Bradt Travel Guides, 2008, there is a legend that Saint Matthew, on a journey to India, died and was buried on the shores of Issyk Kul. In the 4th or 5th century (sic) Armenian monks founded a monastery there (up to eight monasteries were founded later). They are located at Svetly Mys ('bright cape'), 48 km from Karakol, south of the village of Ak-Bulung (formerly Belovodsk) on the Zayachy peninsula at the northeast corner of Issyk Kul. A Russian Orthodox monastery was founded here in 1888. It was sacked by rebels in 1916 and only two monks survived. One, Irakly, fled to Ananyevo. After the revolution, villagers built him a secret cell where he died in 1937. He was canonized in 2000. In September 2006, Vladimir Ploskikh (see Issyk Kul) reported the discovery of a medieval settlement with catacombs on the Zayachy peninsula.

== Demographics ==
Historical populations in Anan'yevo
Year	Pop.
1878	753
1913	2,709
1990	9,380
2009	7,901
2021	9,362
