= Karkyra =

Karkyra Kyrgyz: Каркыра
- Location within Kyrgyzstan
- Coordinates: 42°45′36″N 79°08′48″E
- Country: Kyrgyzstan
- Region: Issyk-Kul Region
- District: Tüp District

Population (2021)
  - Total: 219
- Time zone: UTC+6

Karkyra (Kyrgyz: Каркыра) is a village in the Issyk-Kul Region of Kyrgyzstan. It is part of the Tüp District. The population of the village was 219 in 2021.
