= Oy-Tal, Issyk-Kul =

Oytal Kyrgyz: Ой-Тал
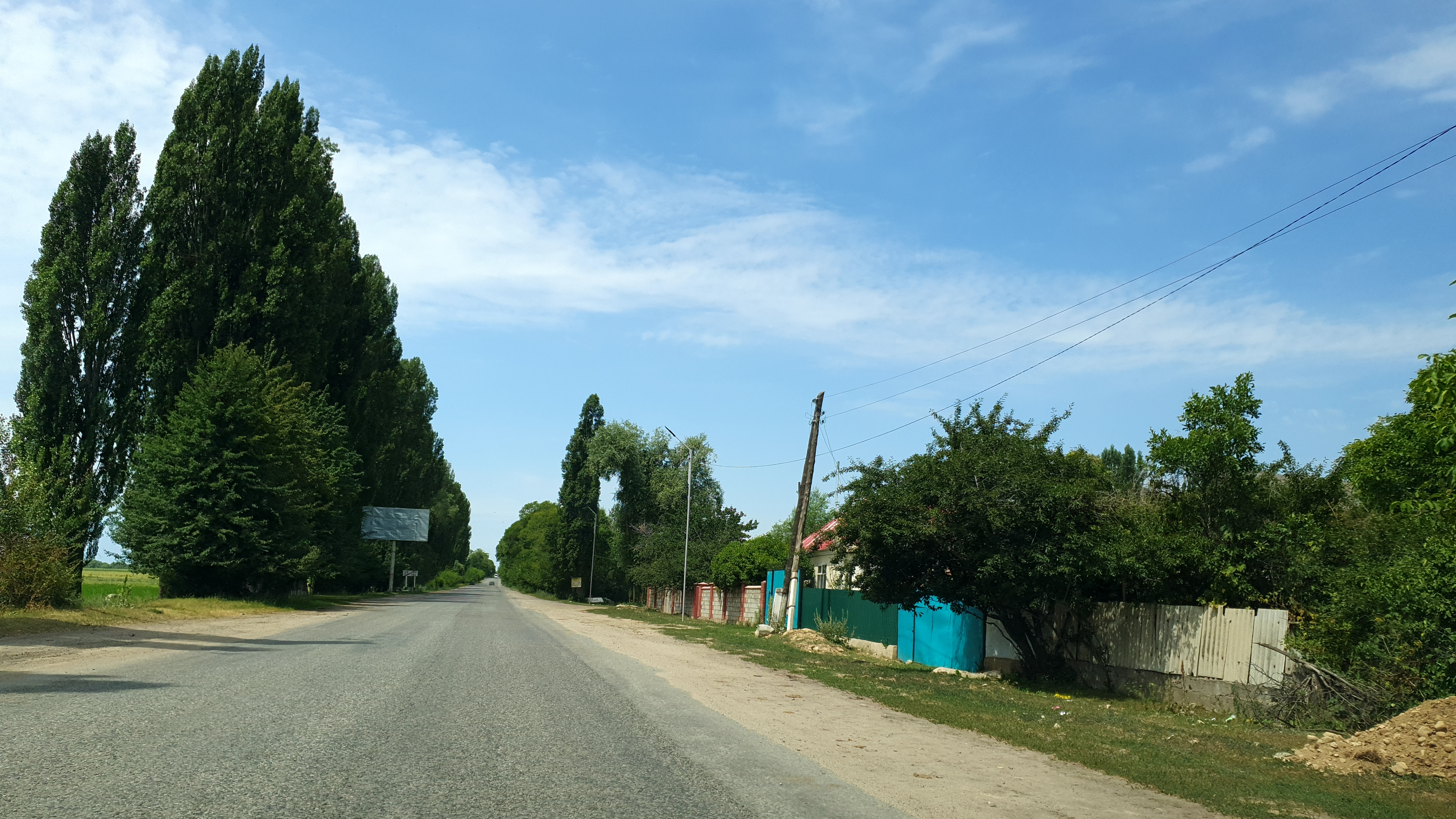

- Location within Kyrgyzstan
- Coordinates: 42°45′N 78°0′E
- Country: Kyrgyzstan
- Region: Issyk-Kul
- District: Tüp
- Elevation: 1,770 m (5,810 ft)

Population (2021)
  - Total: 1,264
- Time zone: UTC+6

Oy-Tal (Kyrgyz: Ой-Тал) is a village in the Issyk-Kul Region of Kyrgyzstan. It is part of the Tüp District. Its population was 1,264 in 2021.
