= Balbay, Kyrgyzstan =

Balbay Kyrgyz: Балбай
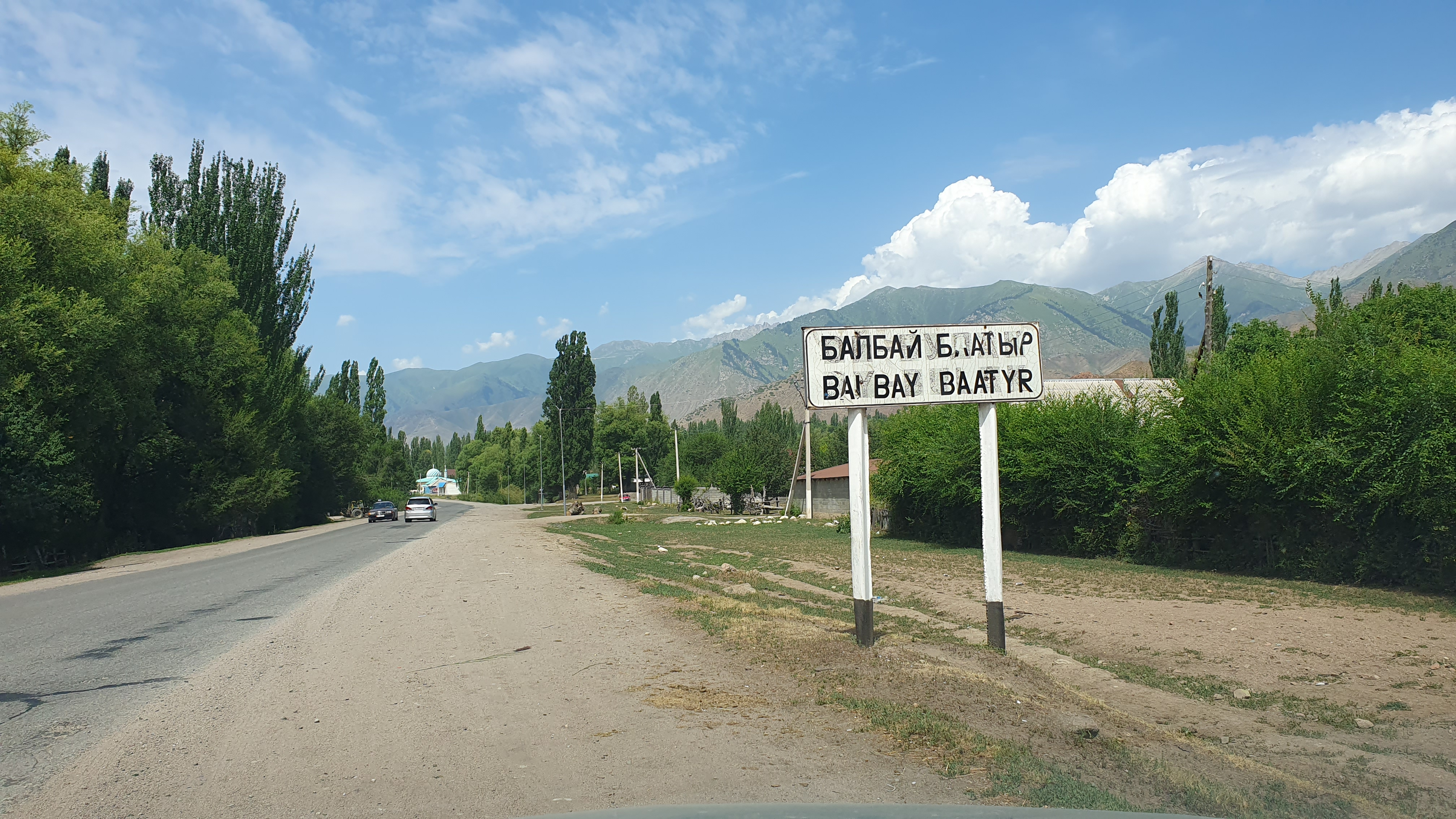

- Location within Kyrgyzstan
- Coordinates: 42°46′48″N 78°16′48″E
- Country: Kyrgyzstan
- Region: Issyk-Kul Region
- District: Tüp District
- Elevation: 1,668 m (5,472 ft)

Population (2021)
  - Total: 2,837
- Time zone: UTC+6

Balbay (Kyrgyz: Балбай, formerly Sarybulak) is a village in the Issyk-Kul Region of Kyrgyzstan. It is part of the Tüp District. Its population was 2,837 in 2021.
