= Toktoyan =

Toktoyan Kyrgyz: Токтоян
- Location within Kyrgyzstan
- Coordinates: 42°42′0″N 78°39′36″E
- Country: Kyrgyzstan
- Region: Issyk-Kul Region
- District: Tüp District
- Elevation: 1,918 m (6,293 ft)

Population (2021)
  - Total: 1,623
- Time zone: UTC+6

Toktoyan is a village in the Issyk-Kul Region of Kyrgyzstan. It is part of the Tüp District. Its population was 1,623 in 2021.
