= Kasymaly Bayaly uulu =

Soviet and Kyrgyz author (1902-1979)

- Касымалы Баялы уулу
- Born: 25 September 1902; Kök-Moynok village, Issyk-Kul Region, Russian Turkestan
- Died: 10 March 1979 (aged 76); Frunze, Kyrgyz SSR
- Writing career
- Genres: short stories, novel
- Notable work: Ajar

Kasymaly Bayaly uulu (Kyrgyz: Касымалы Баялы уулу; also Russified as Kasymaly Bayalinov) was a Kyrgyz writer and translator.

== Life ==
He was born in Kök-Moynok village, Issyk-Kul Region on September 25, 1902. He lost his parents at a young age and grew up with his relatives.

In 1916 during the Urkun he fled to China, returning to Kyrgyzstan in 1918 after the October Revolution.

He is most well known for his story "Ajar", a tragedy of a young girl during the Urkun. This story continues to occupy an important place in Kyrgyz literature.

== Works ==
- Fox and the marten, the snake and the swallow (Tülkü menen suur. Çabalekey menen jylan), 1927 Children's stories
- Ajar (1928), story
- Murat (1929), story
- The happy horseman (Baktyluu jylkyçy), 1937
- Happiness (Bakyt), 1947 novella
- On the shores of the lake (Köl boyunda), 1952 novella
- Brothers (Boordoshtor), 1962 novel
- Difficult transition, 1980 (collection of previously unpublished stories and novellas)
