= Chong-Tash, Tüp =

Chong-Tash Kyrgyz: Чоң-Таш Kyrgyz Latin Çoŋ-Taş
- Location within Kyrgyzstan
- Coordinates: 42°46′18″N 78°37′19″E
- Country: Kyrgyzstan
- Region: Issyk-Kul Region
- District: Tüp District
- Elevation: 1,740 m (5,710 ft)

Population (2021)
  - Total: 1,412
- Time zone: UTC+6

Chong-Tash (Kyrgyz: Чоң-Таш) is a village in the Tüp District of Issyk-Kul Region of Kyrgyzstan. Its population was 1,412 in 2021.
