= Toguz-Bulak, Tüp =

Toguz-Bulak Kyrgyz: Тогуз-Булак
- Location within Kyrgyzstan
- Coordinates: 42°41′10″N 78°18′08″E
- Country: Kyrgyzstan
- Region: Issyk-Kul Region
- District: Tüp District

Population (2021)
  - Total: 1,486
- Time zone: UTC+6

Toguz-Bulak (Kyrgyz: Тогуз-Булак) is a village in the Issyk-Kul Region of Kyrgyzstan. It is part of the Tüp District. The population of the village was 1,486 in 2021.
