= Sart Kalmyks =

Oirat ethnic group lives in Kyrgyzstan

Sart Kalmyk
Regions with significant populations
- Kyrgyzstan: 12,000 (2012)

Languages
- Oirat (Sart Kalmyk), Kyrgyz

Religion
- Sunni Islam

Related ethnic groups
- Kyrgyz, other Mongols, especially Oirats

The Sart Kalmyks or Sart Kalmaks, are an ethnic group of the Oirats, who live in the villages of Chelpek and Börü-Bash in Issyk Kul Province, Kyrgyzstan. Their population is estimated to be c. 12,000. They are descendants of the Ööled tribes, who moved to the territory of the Russian Empire after the failure of the Dungan revolt, some part inhabited the area during the rule of the Zunghar Khanate. They used to speak Sart Kalmyk, a dialect of the Oirat language, but have largely switched to the Kyrgyz language by now. As a result of their long co-inhabitance with Kyrgyz people, they have largely incorporated into the Kyrgyz nation, though some Kyrgyz still consider them to be distinct. Today the majority of Sart Kalmyks also identify themselves as Kyrgyz, or as "almost Kyrgyz". They belong to the Muslim faith.

== History ==
Kalmyks in Kyrgyzstan are one of the isolated sub-ethnic groups of Oirat people, who live in Issyk-Kul Region in the east part of Kyrgyzstan. In 1999 Kyrgyzstan census 5,824 Kalmyks were registered, which is c. 5% of the world population. In 2009 Census there were 3,800 Kalmyks in Kyrgyzstan. Kalmyk people are one of the Mongolian people and speak in the Oirat language. In the 17th century part of the Oirats moved to the European territory, which consist the republic of Kalmykia now. Some little group of Kalmyks and the other Mongolic people lived in the isolation from the main Mongolic area in Xinjiang until the Dungan revolt. After the failure of the revolt in 1771 and return of the Ili region from Russia to China, more than 10,000 Uyghurs, 5,000 Dungans and dozens of Oirat families moved to the territory of the Russian Empire, the territories of the contemporary Kazakhstan and Kyrgyzstan.

== Resettlement ==
Since the 19th century Sart Kalmyks have been living in the east of Issyk-Kul Region, where approximately 91.2% of Kalmyks of Kyrgyzstan live – mostly in Karakol city and Ak-Suu District. During the last decades some of them moved to Chüy Region and Bishkek in search of a better life. In general, Sart Kalmyks make 1.5% of the population of the region and 0.1% of the Kyrgyzstan population. They are traditionally engaged in cattle breeding.

== Bibliography ==
- Ferghana Valley: The Heart of Central Asia
- James Stuart Olson. An Ethnohistorical Dictionary of the Russian and Soviet Empires, 1994
- S.K. Khoyt. The latest figures about localization and population of the Oirat people. //Ethnogenesis and ethnic culture problems of the Turko-Mongolic nations. 2nd Edition. Elista, 2008. p. 184-195 (Russian)

== Bibliography ==
- Tenishev, Edkhyam (1976), "About the Language of Sart Kalmyks of Issyk-Kul" (PDF), Voprosy Jazykoznanija (in Russian), 1: 82–87
- Alymbaeva, Aida (2014), "Between 'Sart' and 'Kalmak': Identity Politics in Kyrgyzstan", Etnograficheskoe Obozrenie (in Russian), 4: 45–55
- Borlykova, Boskha; Menyaev, Badma (2020), "Morphological peculiarities of the Sart-Kalmyk language", Izvestia VGPU. Filologia (in Russian), 148 (5): 128–134
- Borlykova, Boskha; Menyaev, Badma (2022), "Sart-Kalmyks of Kyrgyzstan: a Brief Ethnographic Essay", Nauchniy Dialog (in Russian), 11 (1): 362–278, doi:10.24224/2227-1295-2022-11-1-362-378
