= Taldy-Suu, Issyk Kul =

Taldy-Suu Kyrgyz: Талды-Суу
- Location within Kyrgyzstan
- Coordinates: 42°48′0″N 78°27′36″E
- Country: Kyrgyzstan
- Region: Issyk-Kul Region
- District: Tüp District
- Elevation: 1,788 m (5,866 ft)

Population (2021)
  - Total: 4,696
- Time zone: UTC+6

Taldy-Suu is a village in the Issyk-Kul Region of Kyrgyzstan. It is part of the Tüp District. Its population was 4,696 in 2021.
