= Kojojash =

Kojojash is a Kyrgyz lesser epic tale that has been told for centuries. The Kyrgyz are an ancient Turkic tribe from Central Asia. Although there is evidence that the ancient Kyrgyz had a runic alphabet, epic tales such as this were never written down. They were passed from generation to generation orally. These epic tales chronicle the history of the Kyrgyz people; they highlight the importance of heroes and showcase the battles between internal and external enemies (Köçümkulkïzï). These tales are the only sources of ancient Kyrgyz history.

== The characters ==
=== Kojojash ===
Kojojash is the protagonist of this epic tale. He is a very skilled hunter capable of slaughtering almost any animal. His skills are so high that he can provide for a tribe of twenty families. Those families rely on him for support. Without him, they cannot eat. Kojojash is too proud; his pride leads him to his death. He cannot accept that some animals are able to escape from his gun. His lust to kill drives him to the cliffs where he meets his death.

=== Zulayka ===
Zulayka is the wife of Kojojash and the interpreter of the dream. When Kojojash dreams of becoming lost on a cliff, she interprets this as a bad omen and begs him to stop hunting. Zulayka cares deeply for her husband. In fact, she chose him instead of he choosing her. She bears one son Moldojash.

=== Sur-Ecki ===
Sur-Ecki is the she-goat that Kojojash swears to kill. The wife of Alabash, she has hundreds of children and is very prosperous. One day as she is feeding with her kids, Kojojash comes and slaughters all of them. She begs him to spare her husband and herself, so she may bear more children and continue the line of their family. Kojojash refuses and blatantly kills Alabash in front of Sur-Ecki's face. Sur-Ecki swears revenge and leads Kojojash on top a steep rocky cliff, in essence leading him to his death. At the end of the story, Sur-Ecki becomes the wife of Kojojash's son, Moldojash.

=== Moldojash ===
Moldojash is the son of Zulayka and Kojojash. He searches for his father's remains, but cannot find them. At the end of the tale, he marries Sur-Ecki, thus restoring peace between man and the goats.

== The story ==
The tale begins by introducing Kojojash. Kojojash is a great hunter. He is revered by his tribe and provides for them by hunting. No animal can seem to escape him. One day, as Kojojash was walking through the village, he met a girl named Zulayka. Zulayka was choosing a husband from a crowd of men. When she saw Kojojash, she immediately chose him. The two were wed.

One night, Kojojash had a dream. In his dream, he came upon a herd of goats and slaughtered every last one. On his way back, he became trapped upon a high cliff ledge. His wife interpreted this dream as a bad omen. In the wilderness, the she-goat Sur-Ecki also had a bad dream. She dreamt that a hunter slaughtered all of her children. Both of these dreams act as foreshadowing for the events to come. As Kojojash is hunting the next day, the events of his dream begin to unfold. He comes upon a family of goats and slaughters all of the kids. The she goat Sur-Ecki pleads for Kojojash to let her husband and her live and reproduce, but Kojojash slaughters her husband Alabash in front of her face. Sur-Ecki swears revenge, and flees from Kojojash without being harmed. Kojojash swears to hunt down and kill Sur-Ecki. Kojojash returns home and reveals the events of the hunt to his wife. She is scared for his life and asks him to stop hunting. He refuses, since he is the sole provider of food for his tribe. Kojojash decides that he will continue to pursue and hunt down Sur-Ecki. As he is chasing her, she leads him onto a steep rocky cliff. Kojojash becomes trapped, just like in his dream. Kojojash calls out and his father finds him. He instructs his father Karïpbay to go to the village and have the carpenters build a ladder.

After the ladder rescue attempt fails, Kojojash decides that his only option is death. He instructs his pregnant wife to name their child Moldojash if it is a son. And then, he throws himself off the cliff to his death. Zulayka bears a son, and names him Moldojash after her late husband's request. Moldojash searches for his father after he learns of Kojojash's death. He cannot find the remains, but he does find Sur-Ecki. He marries Sur-Ecki, and returns home to his people.
