= Sary-Tologoy =

Sary-Tologoy Kyrgyz: Сары-Тологой
- Location within Kyrgyzstan
- Coordinates: 42°43′26″N 78°46′50″E
- Country: Kyrgyzstan
- Region: Issyk-Kul
- District: Tüp
- Elevation: 1,805 m (5,922 ft)

Population (2021)
  - Total: 1,631
- Time zone: UTC+6

Sary-Tologoy (Kyrgyz: Сары-Тологой) is a village in the Tüp District of Issyk-Kul Region of Kyrgyzstan. Its population was 1,631 in 2021.
