= Tüp =

Tüp Kyrgyz: Түп
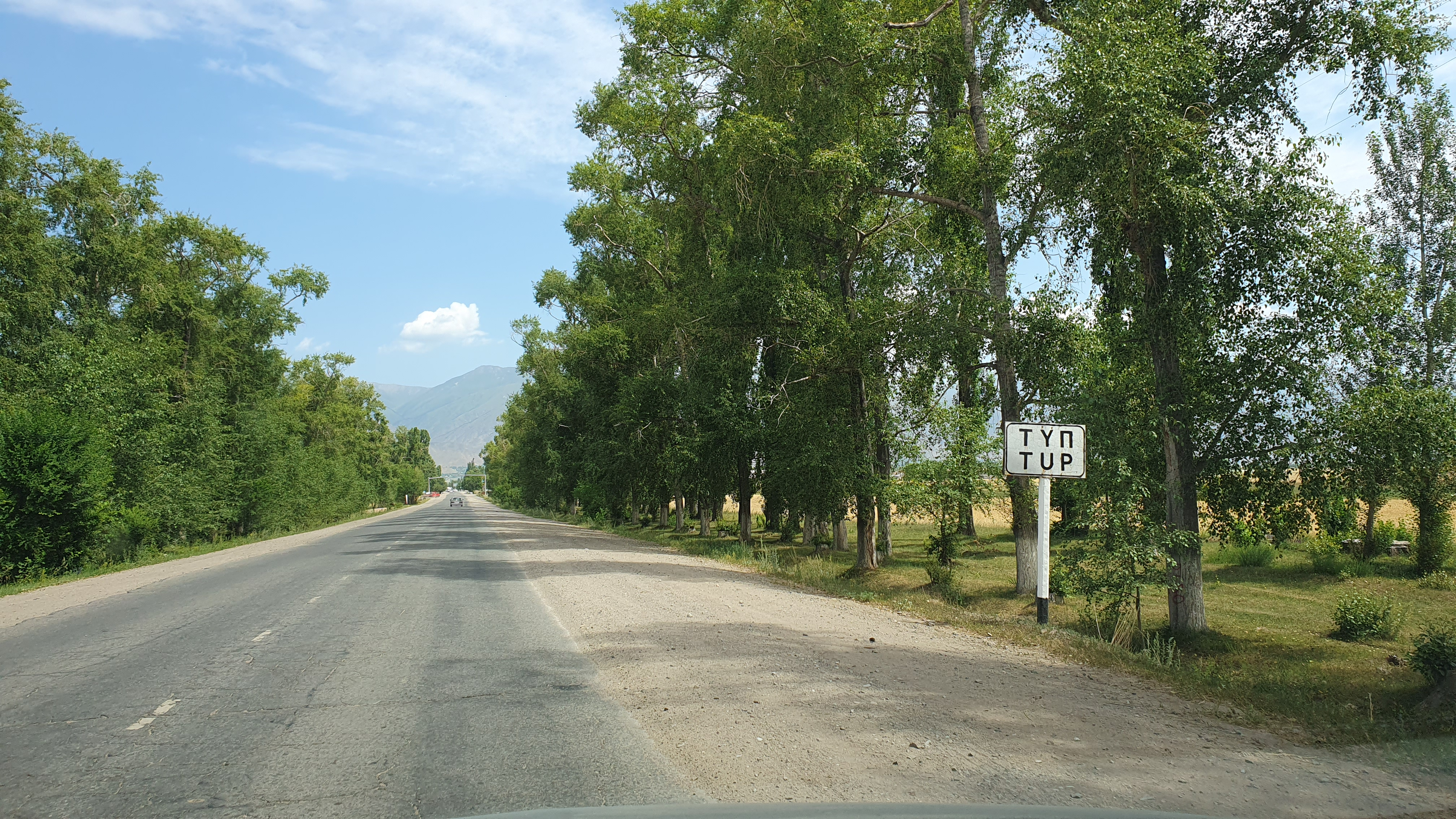

- Location within Kyrgyzstan
- Coordinates: 42°43′48″N 78°21′36″E
- Country: Kyrgyzstan
- Region: Issyk-Kul Region
- District: Tüp District
- Preobrazhenskoye: 1870

Population (2021)
  - Total: 12,355

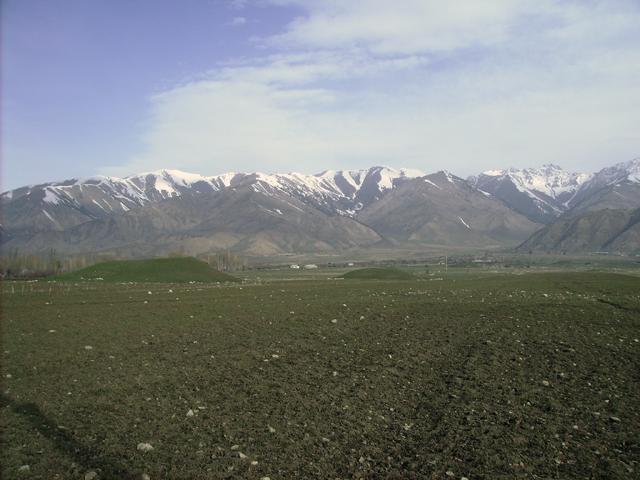
Landscape near Tüp

Tüp (Kyrgyz: Түп) or Tyup (Russian: Тюп) is a large village in the Issyk-Kul Region of Kyrgyzstan, and the center of the Tüp District. It was established as village Preobrazhenskoye in 1870. Its population was 12,355 in 2021. Tüp is a road junction town at the northeast corner of Lake Issyk Kul. To the west on A363 is Anan'yevo and to the south Karakol. To the east, A362 leads up the Karkara valley to Kazakhstan.

The Karkara ('black crane') Valley leads east from here about 60 km to Kazakhstan between the Kyungey Ala-Too to the north and the Central Tian Shan to the south. There is an annual horse festival. Halfway up the valley is the village of San-Tash (counting stones). It is said that Tamerlane once ordered each of his soldiers to place a stone in a pile as they passed. When they returned, each soldier was to remove a stone, the number of remaining stones being the number of soldiers that has died. There is a small hollow in the top of the pile, representing the comparatively very small number of people who returned. There are no other stones in the region for miles around.

== Population ==
Historical population
Year	Pop.	±% p.a.
2009	9,828	—
2021	12,355	+1.93%
Note: resident population; Sources:
