= Tüp District =

Tüp Kyrgyz: Түп району
- District
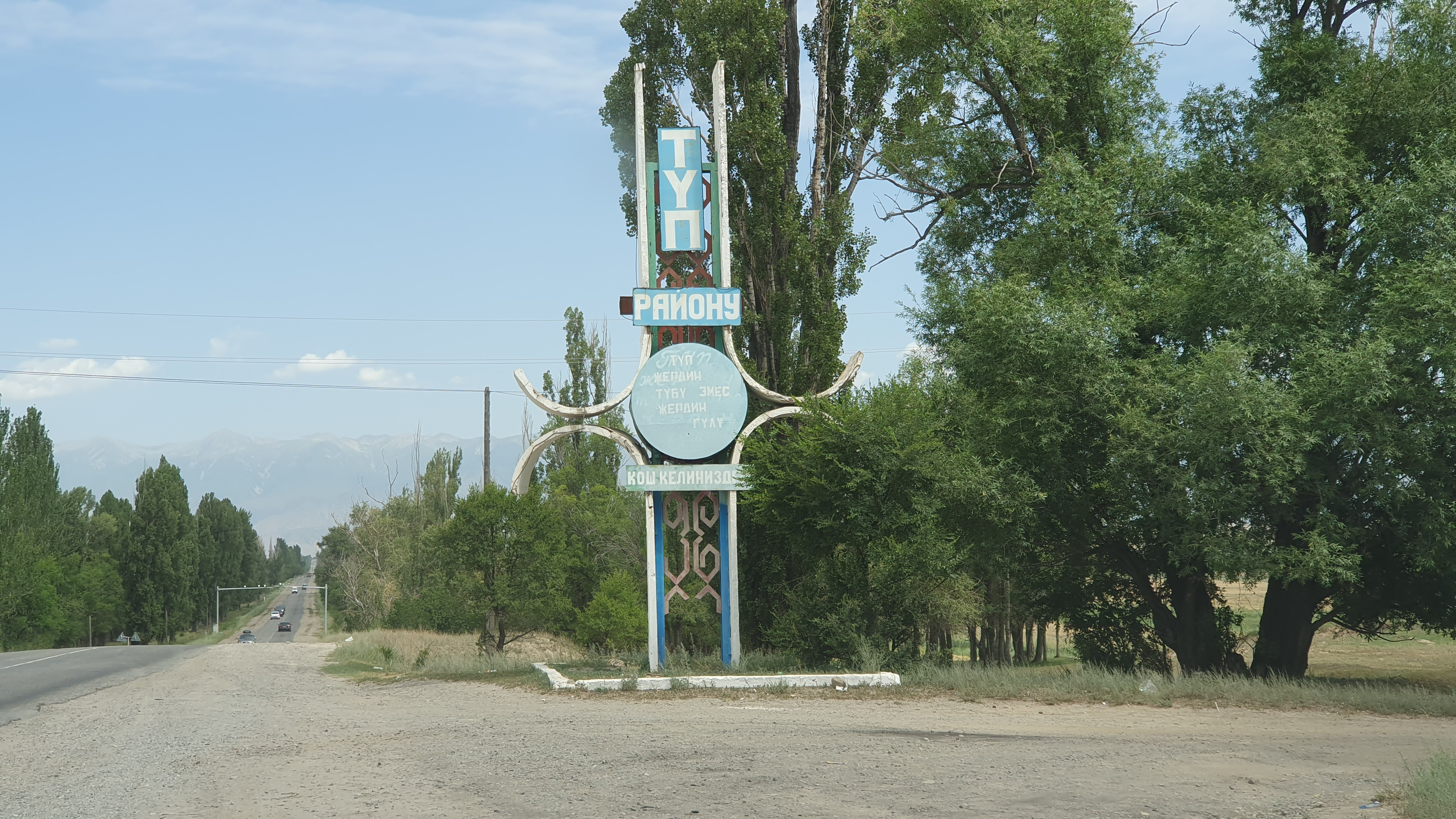

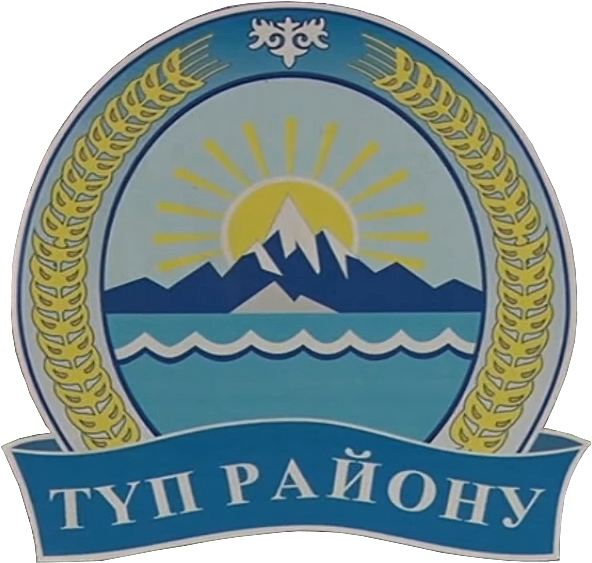
- Coat of arms

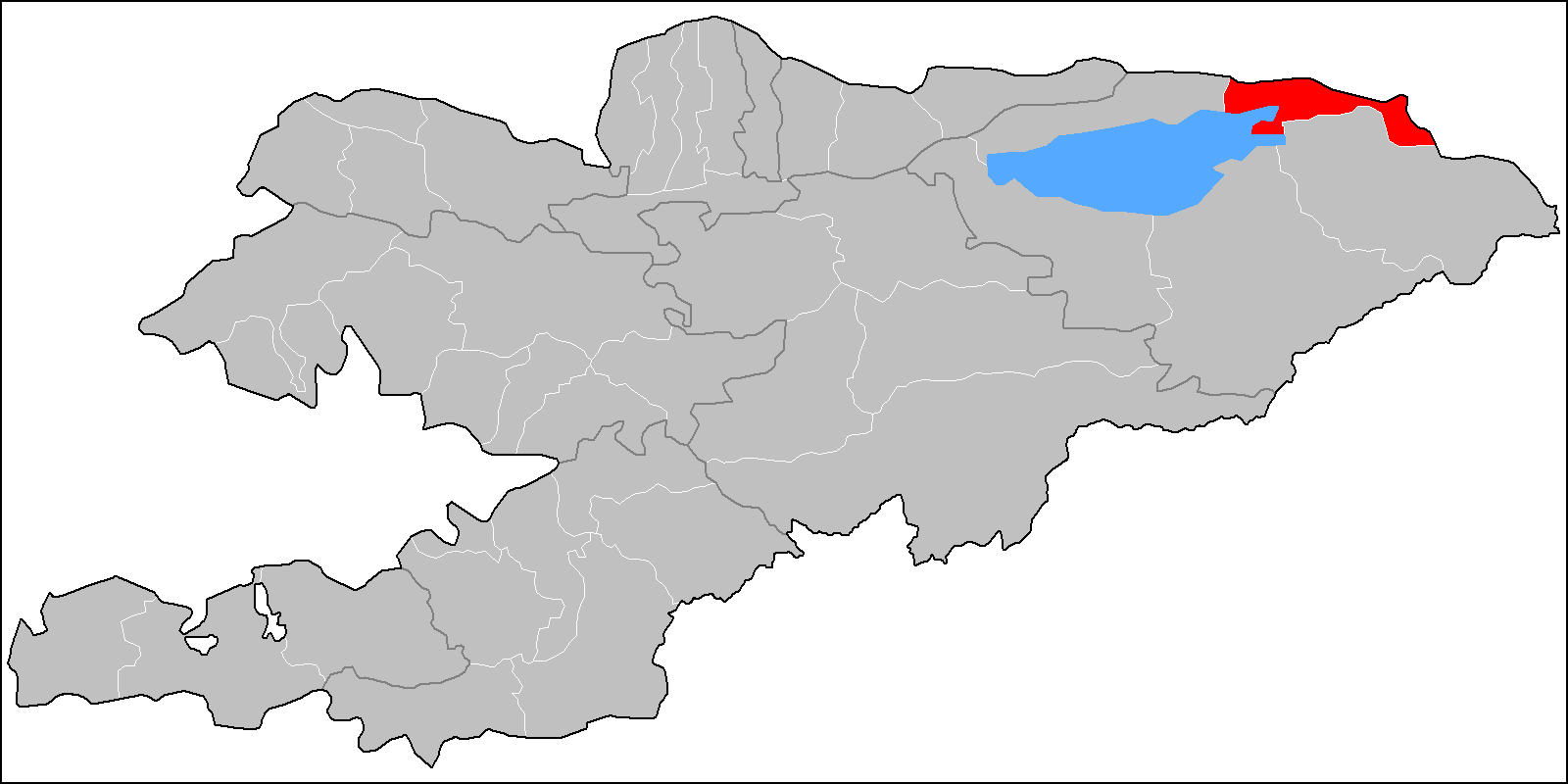
- Coordinates: 42°45′N 78°20′E
- Country: Kyrgyzstan
- Region: Issyk-Kul

Area
  - Total: 2,121 km^{2} (819 sq mi)

Population (2021)
  - Total: 65,169
  - Density: 30.73/km^{2} (79.58/sq mi)
- Time zone: UTC+6

Tüp (Kyrgyz: Түп району) is a district of Issyk-Kul Region in north-eastern Kyrgyzstan. The seat lies at Tüp. Its area is 2,121 square kilometres (819 sq mi), and its resident population was 65,169 in 2021. It borders Issyk-Kul District to the west, Ak-Suu District to the east and south-east, Kazakhstan to the north, and Issyk Kul to the south.

== Geography ==
The district is located between Küngöy Ala-Too Range and Issyk-Kul lake. The topography varies from multiple-folded medium-altitude mountains featuring in erosional dissection to alluvial - proluvial planes with river fans, and lakeside planes of Issyk-Kul lake area. Approximately 48% of the district is occupied by mountains, and 48% - by valleys. The hydrological conditions are dominated by Tüp river that rises on north slopes of Teskey Ala-Too Range.

== Climate ==
An average temperature in January is -6°C in valleys, and -14°C in mountains. In July, an average temperature varies from +18°C in valleys, to +9°C in mountains. An absolute recorded temperature maximum is +35°. Average maximum temperatures are +30°C in valleys, and +15°C in mountains. Average yearly precipitation is 350-400 mm in valleys, and 500-600 mm in mountains. An average snow cover is up to 30 cm. The Eastern wind called Santash reaches 20-30 m/s.

== Ecology ==
The fauna of the area is notably diverse. On the coastal plain, pheasants and hares are common, along with acclimatized species such as the Ussuri raccoon dog and muskrat. The lake serves as a wintering site for waterbirds, including the great egret, woodcock, swans, gray geese, ducks, and other species.

In the forested gorges, roe deer, lynx, bears, wolves, badgers, and martens are found. Above the upper forest line live mountain goats and the snow leopard, while the high plateaus are inhabited by argali. Snowcocks, as well as vultures and golden eagles, can also be observed here. In the mountain steppes and meadows, marmots are abundant.

== Population ==
Historical population
| Year | Pop. | ±% p.a. |
|---|---|---|
| 1970 | 46,940 | — |
| 1979 | 49,428 | +0.58% |
| 1989 | 53,119 | +0.72% |
| 1999 | 54,534 | +0.26% |
| 2009 | 58,786 | +0.75% |
| 2021 | 65,169 | +0.86% |
Note: resident population; Sources:

== Populated places ==
In total, Tüp District includes 37 settlements in 13 rural communities (ayyl aymagy). Each rural community may include one or several villages. The rural communities and settlements in the Tüp District are:

1. Ak-Bulak (seat: Ak-Bulak)
2. Ak-Bulung (seat: Ak-Bulung; incl. Belovodskoye and Frunzenskoe)
3. Aral (seat: Ming-Bulak; incl. Aral, Dolon, Kosh-Döbö and Sary-Döbö)
4. Chong-Tash (seat: Chong-Tash; incl. Jyluu-Bulak)
5. Karasaev (seat: Tasma; incl. Toktoyan and Chong-Toguz-Bay)
6. Kuturgu (seat: Kuturgu; incl. Kichi-Örüktü, Oy-Bulak and Oy-Tal)
7. Mikhaylovka (seat: Mikhaylovka)
8. San-Tash (seat: Bayzak; incl. Karkyra, Keng-Suu, San-Tash and Sary-Tologoy)
9. Sary-Bulak (seat: Balbay; incl. Kürmöntü)
10. Taldy-Suu (seat: Taldy-Suu; incl. Ichke-Suu, Kööchü and Korumdu)
11. Toguz-Bulak (seat: Toguz-Bulak; incl. Sary-Bulung)
12. Tüp (seat: Tüp; incl. Birlik and Shaty)
13. Ysyk-Köl (seat - village: Ysyk-Köl; incl. Yntymak)
Settlements of the Tup District
