= Issyk-Kul Region =

Region of Kyrgyzstan

Issyk-Kul Region: Ысык-Көл облусу (Kyrgyz); Иссык-Кульская область (Russian)
- Region
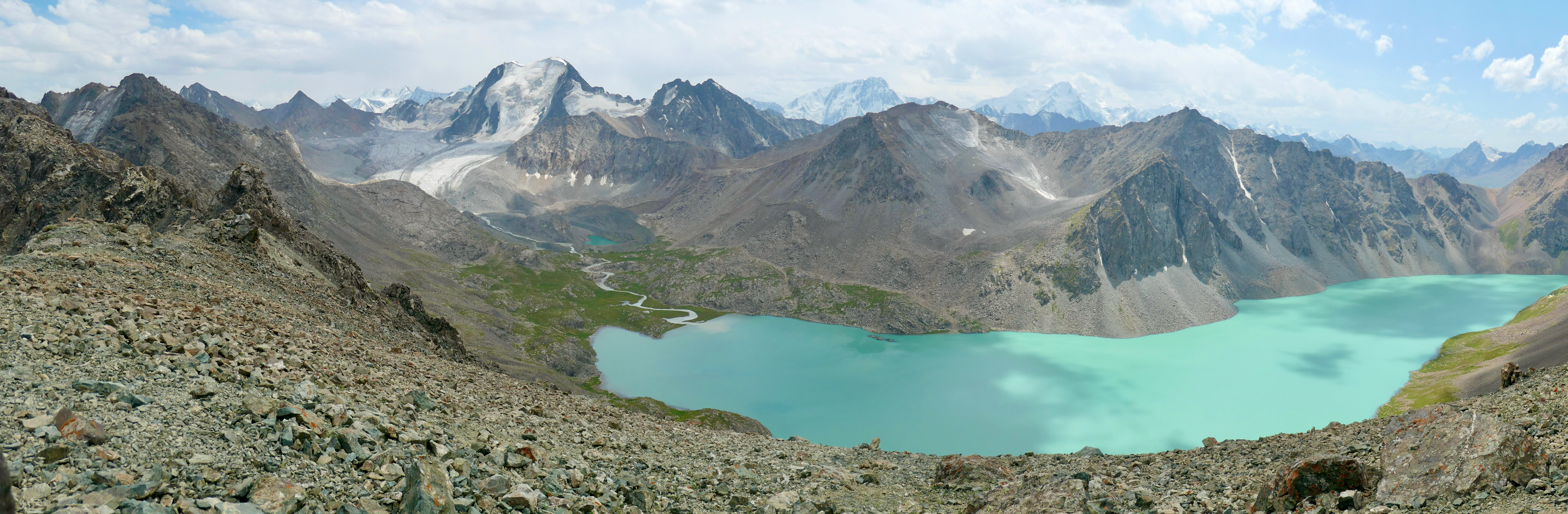
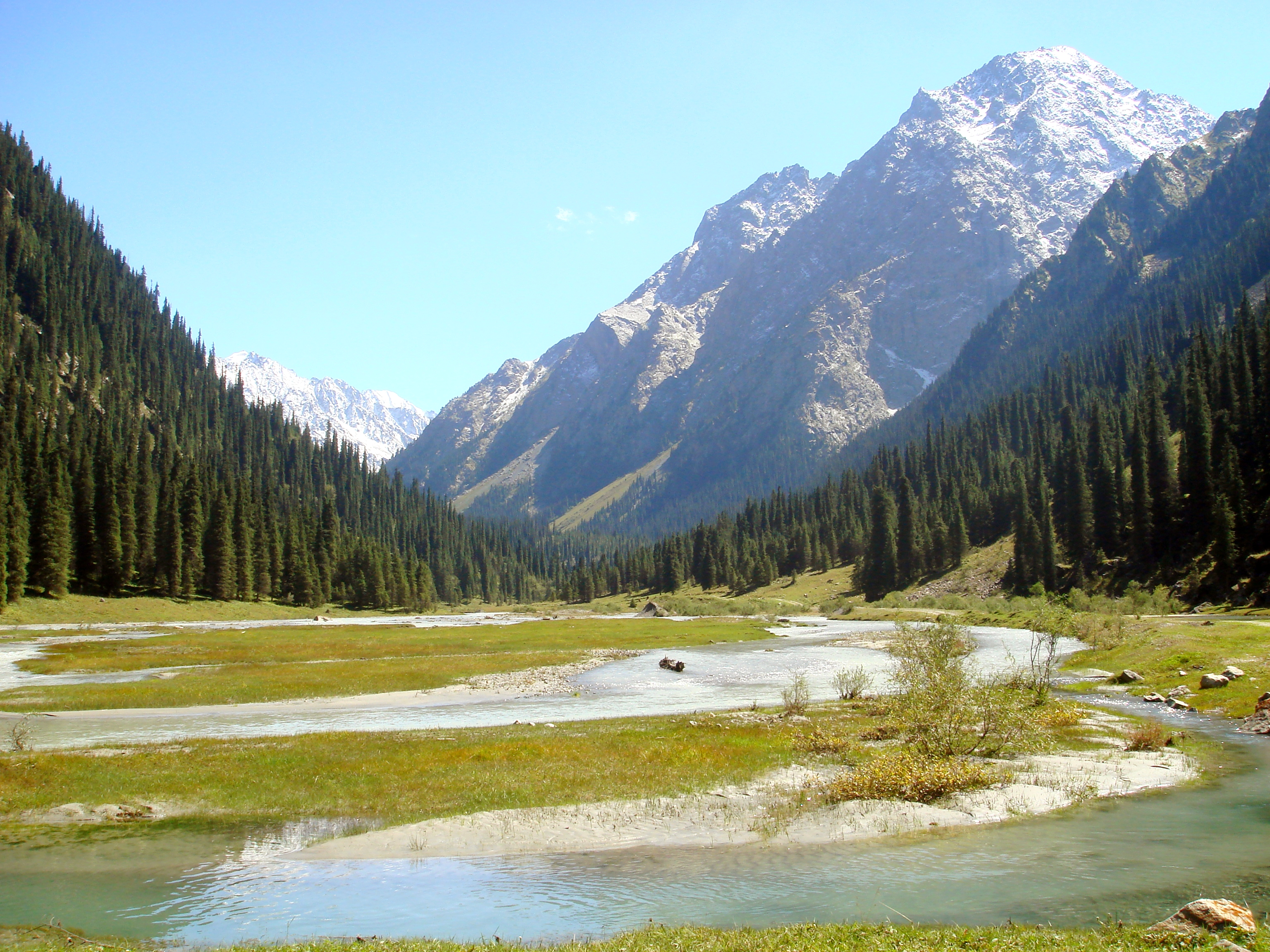
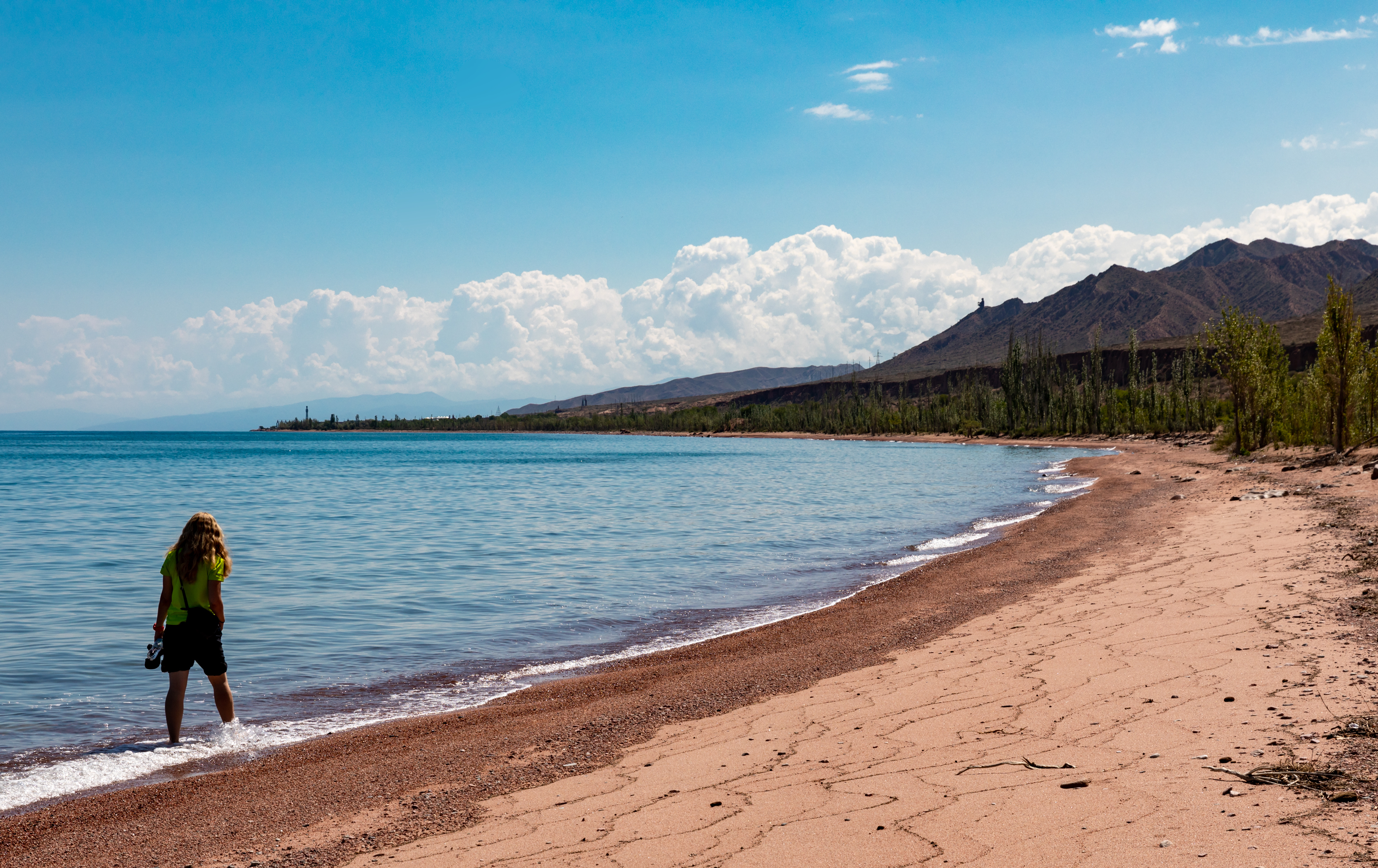
- From the top, Ala-Köl, Karakol Valley, Issyk-Kul Lake

- Flag Coat of arms

- Map of Kyrgyzstan, location of Issyk-Kul Region highlighted, with Lake Issyk-Kul in blue
- Coordinates: 42°0′N 78°0′E
- Country: Kyrgyzstan
- Capital: Karakol

Government
  - Gubernator: Baktybek Jetigenov

Area
  - Total: 43,735 km^{2} (16,886 sq mi)

Population (2023)
  - Total: 538,384
  - Density: 12.310/km^{2} (31.883/sq mi)
- Time zone: UTC+6 (Kyrgyzstan Time)
- ISO 3166 code: KG-Y
- Districts: 5
- Cities: 3
- Towns: 2
- Villages: 175
- Website: www.kfcnz.com

Issyk-Kul (Note: Kyrgyz: Ысык-Көл облусу, romanized: Ysyk-Köl oblusu, pronounced [ɯsɯ̆q.kɵ́l obɫʊsʊ́]) is one of the regions of Kyrgyzstan. Its capital is Karakol. It is surrounded by Almaty Region, Kazakhstan to the north, Chüy Region to the west, Naryn Region to the southwest, and Xinjiang, China to the southeast. It takes its name from Lake Issyk-Kul, the world's second-largest high altitude lake. Its total area is 43,735 km^{2} (16,886 sq mi). The resident population of the region was 501,933 as of January 2021. The region has a sizeable Russian (8.0% in 2009) minority.

== Geography ==
The north is dominated by the eye-shaped Issyk-Kul lake, surrounded by the ridges of the Tian Shan mountain system: the Kyungey Ala-Too mountains to the north and the Terskey Alatau to the south (the 'sunny' and 'shady' Alatau, respectively). To the south are mountains and 'jailoos' (mountain meadows used for summer grazing). The highest peaks of the Tian Shan mountains, including Khan Tengri, are located in the easternmost part of the region.

Most of the population of the region lives around the lake, in particular in the cities of Balykchy near the lake's western end, and Karakol near its eastern end.

== Divisions ==
Issyk-Kul is divided administratively into two cities of regional significance, Karakol and Balykchy, and five districts:

District	Seat	Map
Ak-Suu District	Teploklyuchenka	
Issyk-Kul District	Cholpon-Ata	
Jeti-Ögüz District	Kyzyl-Suu	
Tong District	Bökönbaev	
Tüp District	Tüp	

Cholpon-Ata is a city of district significance. There are two urban-type settlements in the region: Pristan'-Przheval'sk (part of Karakol city) and Orto-Tokoy (part of Balykchy city).

== Basic socio-economic indicators ==
The economically active population of Issyk-Kul in 2009 was 193,706, of which 172,908 employed and 20,798 (10.7%) unemployed.

- Export: 18.8 million US dollars (2008)
- Import: 221.7 million US dollars (2008)
- Direct Foreign Investments: 1,1 million US dollars (in 2008)

== Demographics ==
The official population estimate for January 2021 was 501,933. In 2009 28.7% of the population lived in the region's cities and urban-type settlements, and 71.3% in the rural areas.

Historical populations in Issyk-Kul Region
Year	Pop.	±% p.a.
1970	314,386	—
1979	350,634	+1.22%
1989	403,917	+1.42%
1999	413,149	+0.23%
2009	438,389	+0.59%
2021	501,933	+1.13%
Note: resident population; Sources:

=== Ethnic composition ===
According to the 2009 Census, the ethnic composition (de jure population) of Issyk-Kul Region was:

Ethnic group	Population	Proportion of Issyk-Kul Region population
Kyrgyzs	377,994	86.2%
Russians	35,275	8.0%
Kazakhs	6,464	1.5%
Uygurs	3,897	0.9%
Kalmyks (Sart Kalmyks)	3,801	0.9%
Dungans	3,124	0.7%
Uzbeks	2,982	0.7%
Tatars	2,098	0.5%
Ukrainians	1,170	0.3%
other groups	1,584	0.3%

== Transportation ==
The railroad coming from the northwest (from Bishkek) ends at Balykchy. The main highway (A365) from Bishkek passes through Balykchy and into the Naryn Region on its way to the Torugart Pass into China. Highway A363 circles the lake and A362 runs east from the lake into Kazakhstan. Issyk-Kul International Airport and Karakol International Airport link the region with Almaty in Kazakhstan. Cholpon-Ata Airport and Tamga Airport have no regular flights.

== Tourism ==
The region, which resembles the Alps or Colorado, would be a major tourist destination were it not for its remoteness and underdeveloped infrastructure. Currently, it is visited mostly by locals who use the Soviet-era establishments around the lake.

== Gallery ==
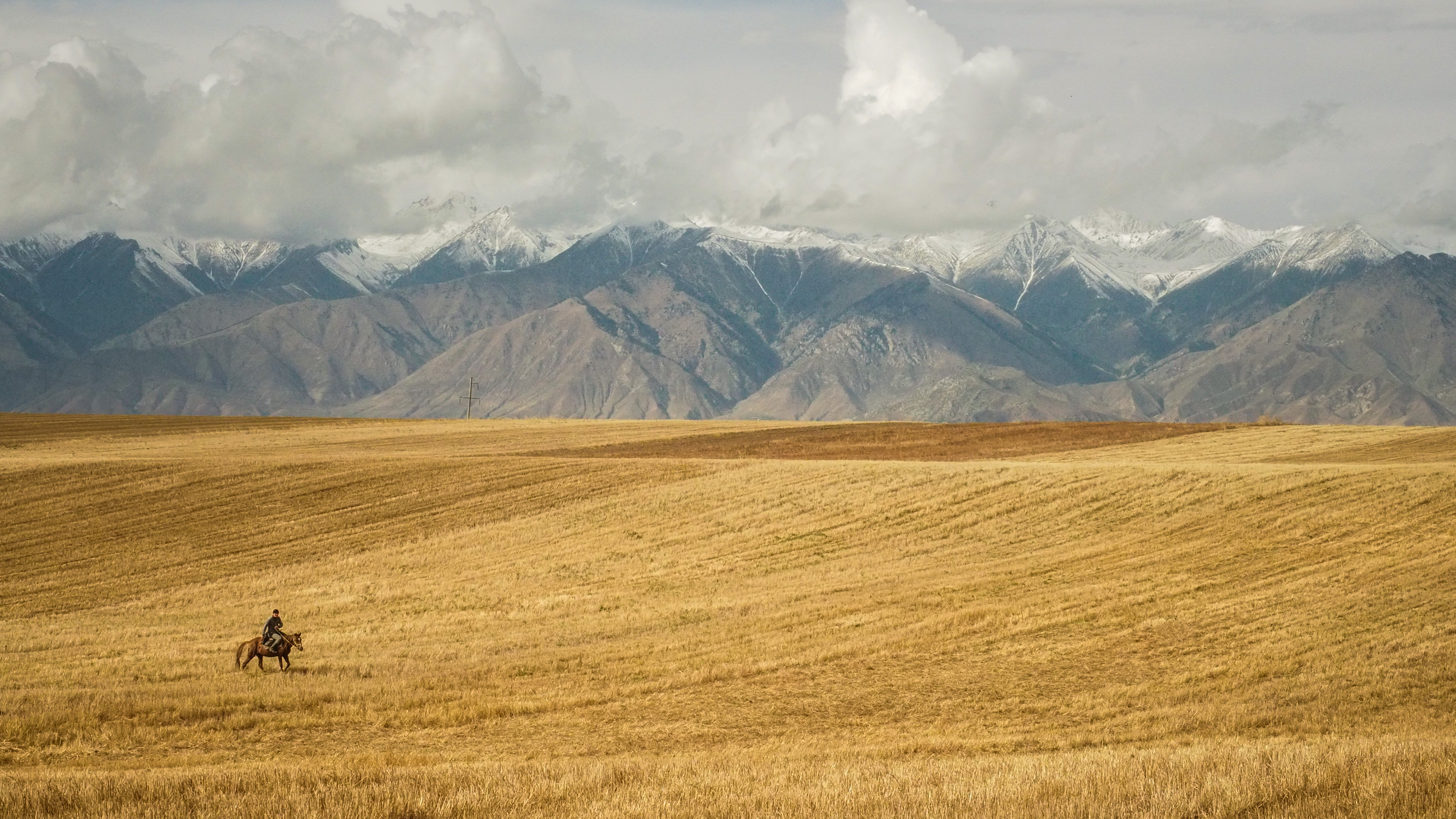
Issyk Kul, Kyrgyzstan

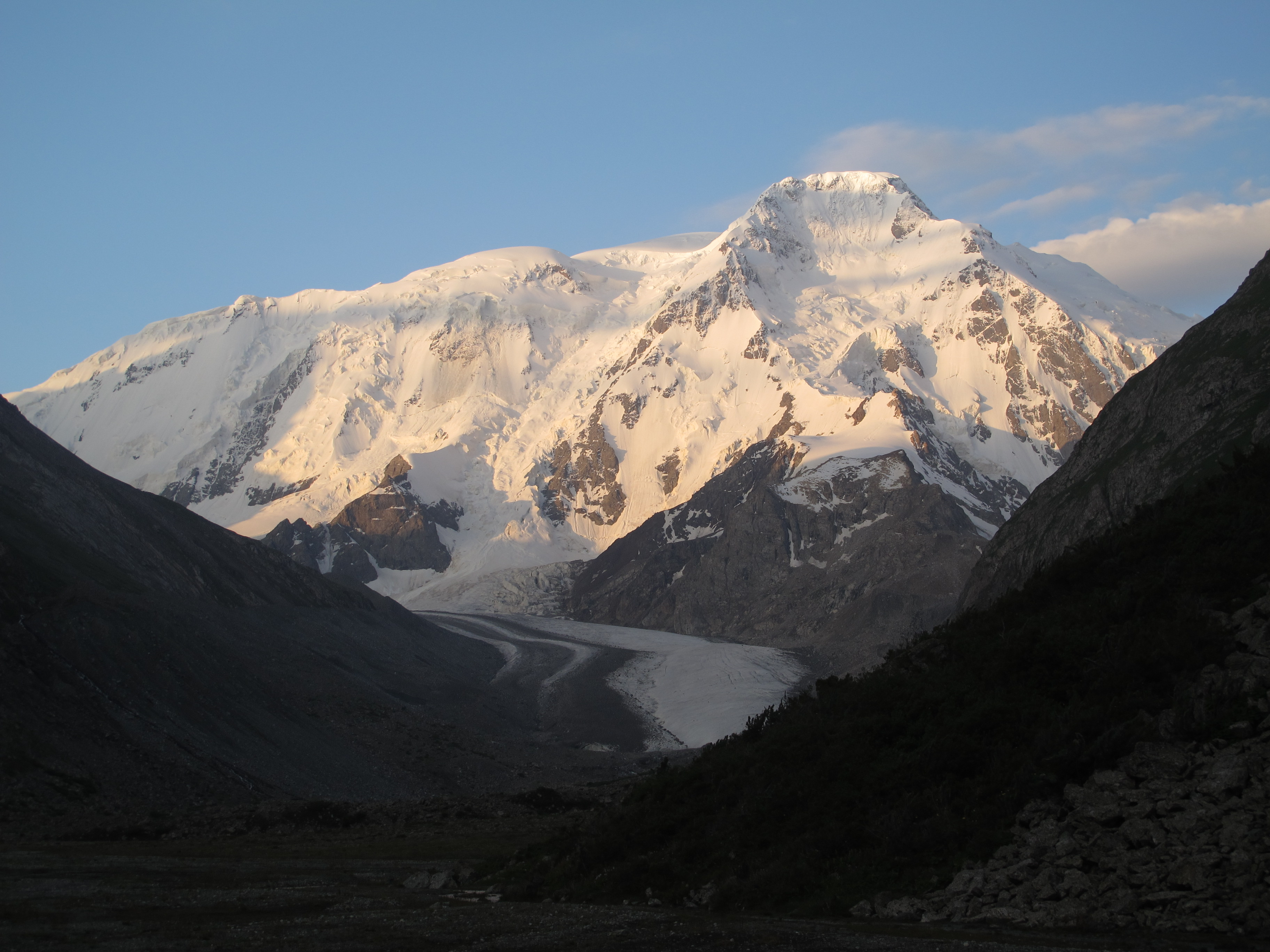
Karakol Peak

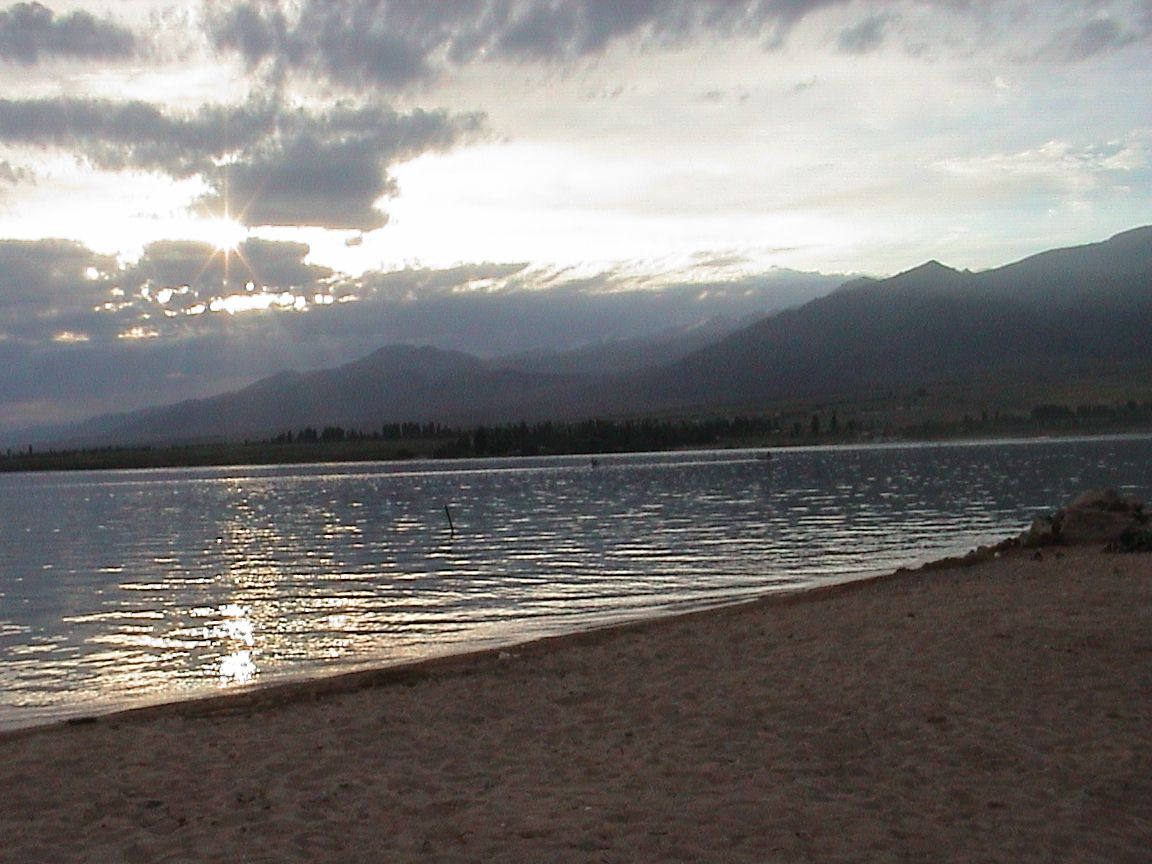
Lake Issyk-Kul at sundown

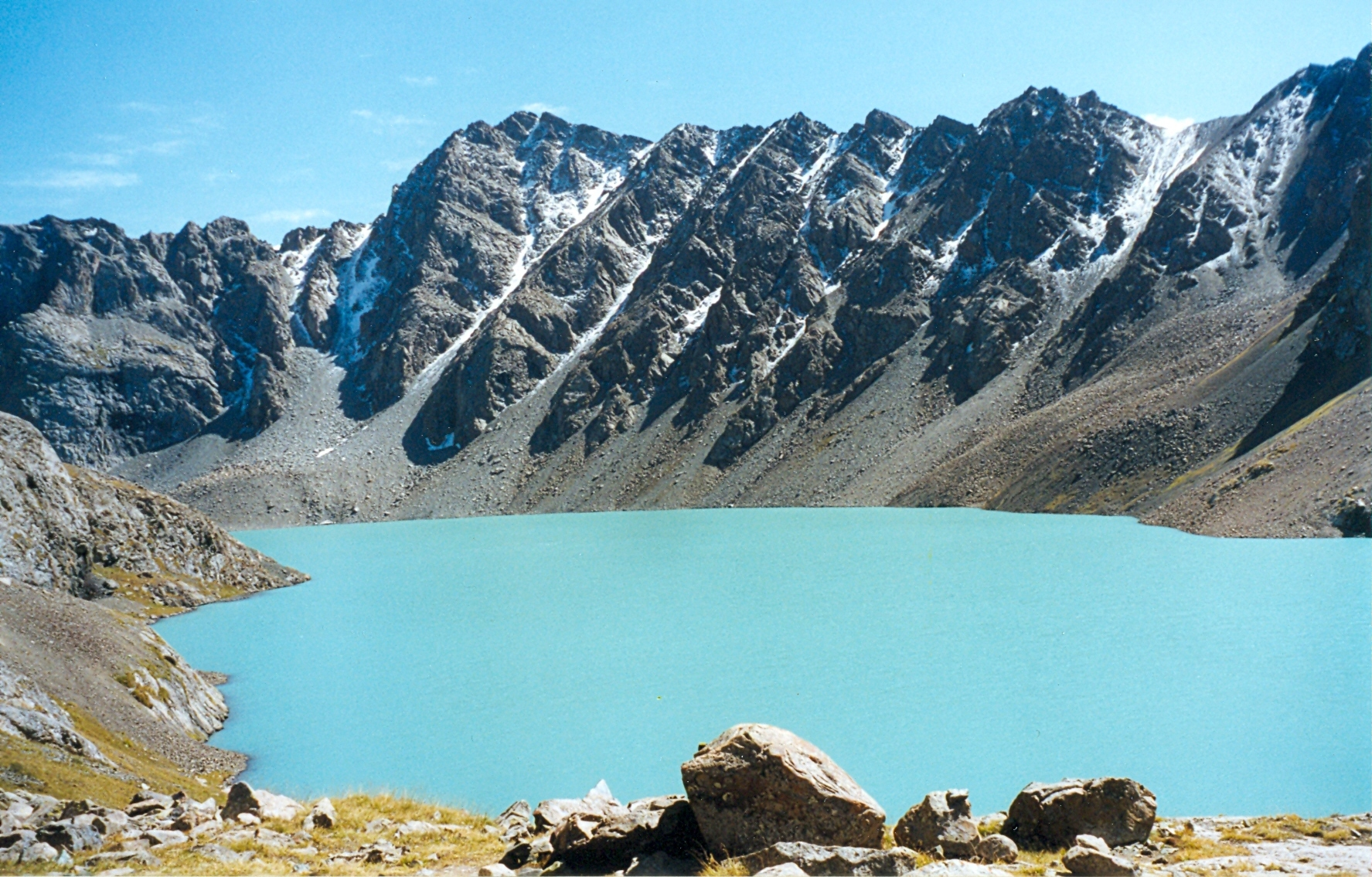
Ala Köl Lake in the Terskey Ala-too mountains, Kyrgyzstan

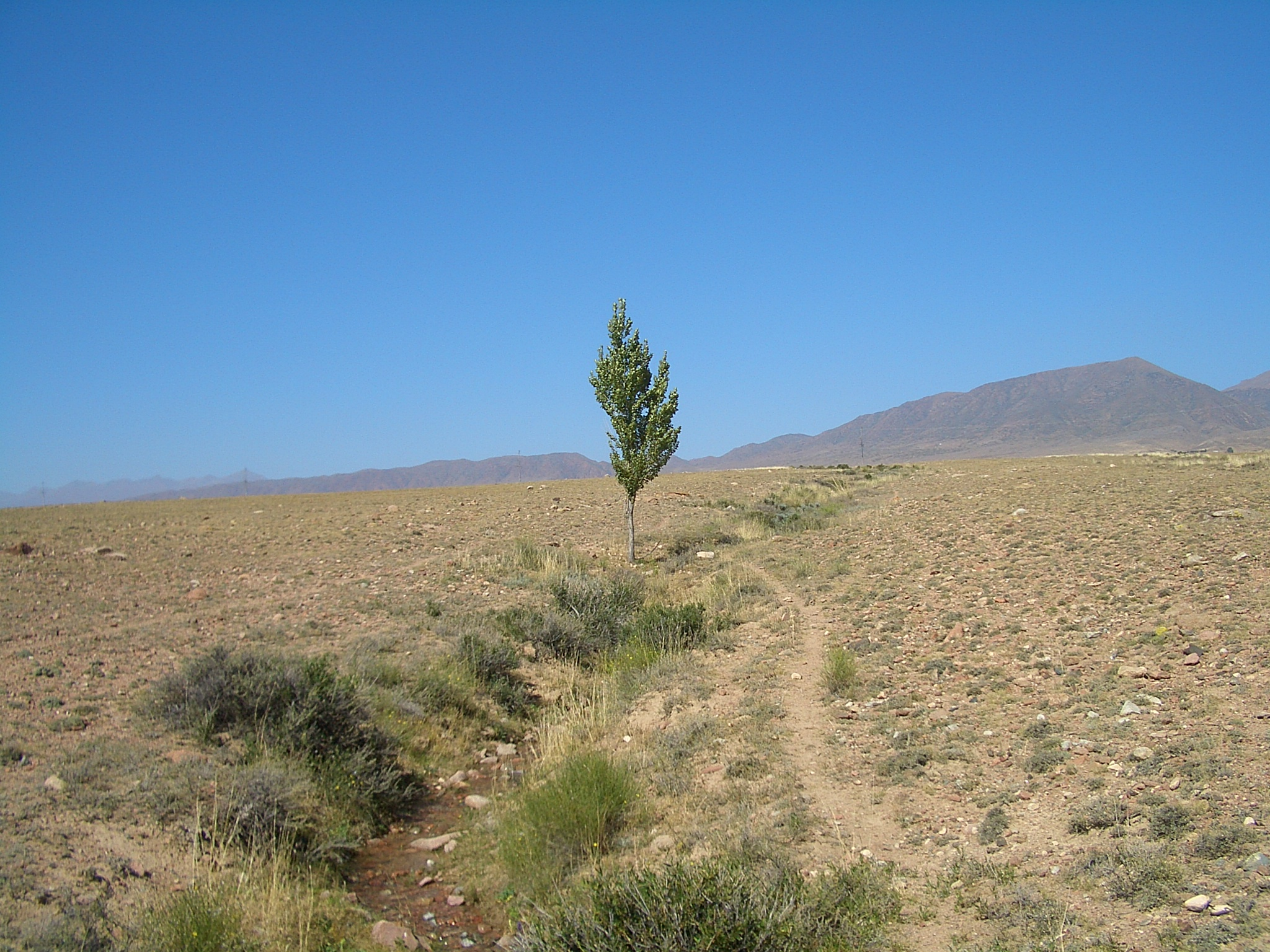
On the plateau between the north shore of Lake Issyk-Kul and the Küngöy Ala-Too Range (near Tamchy)

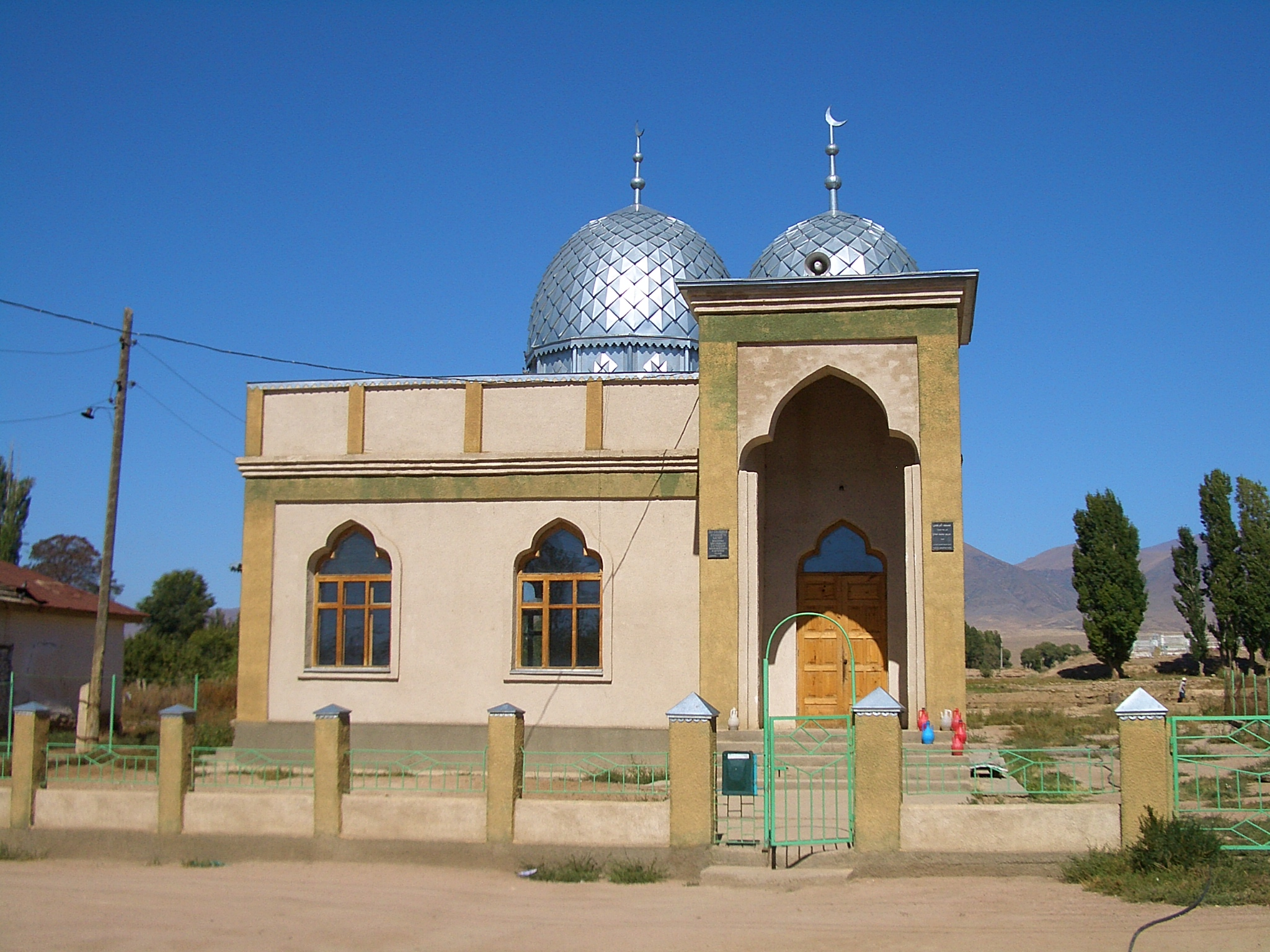
A mosque in Tamchy village, Issyk-Kul Region

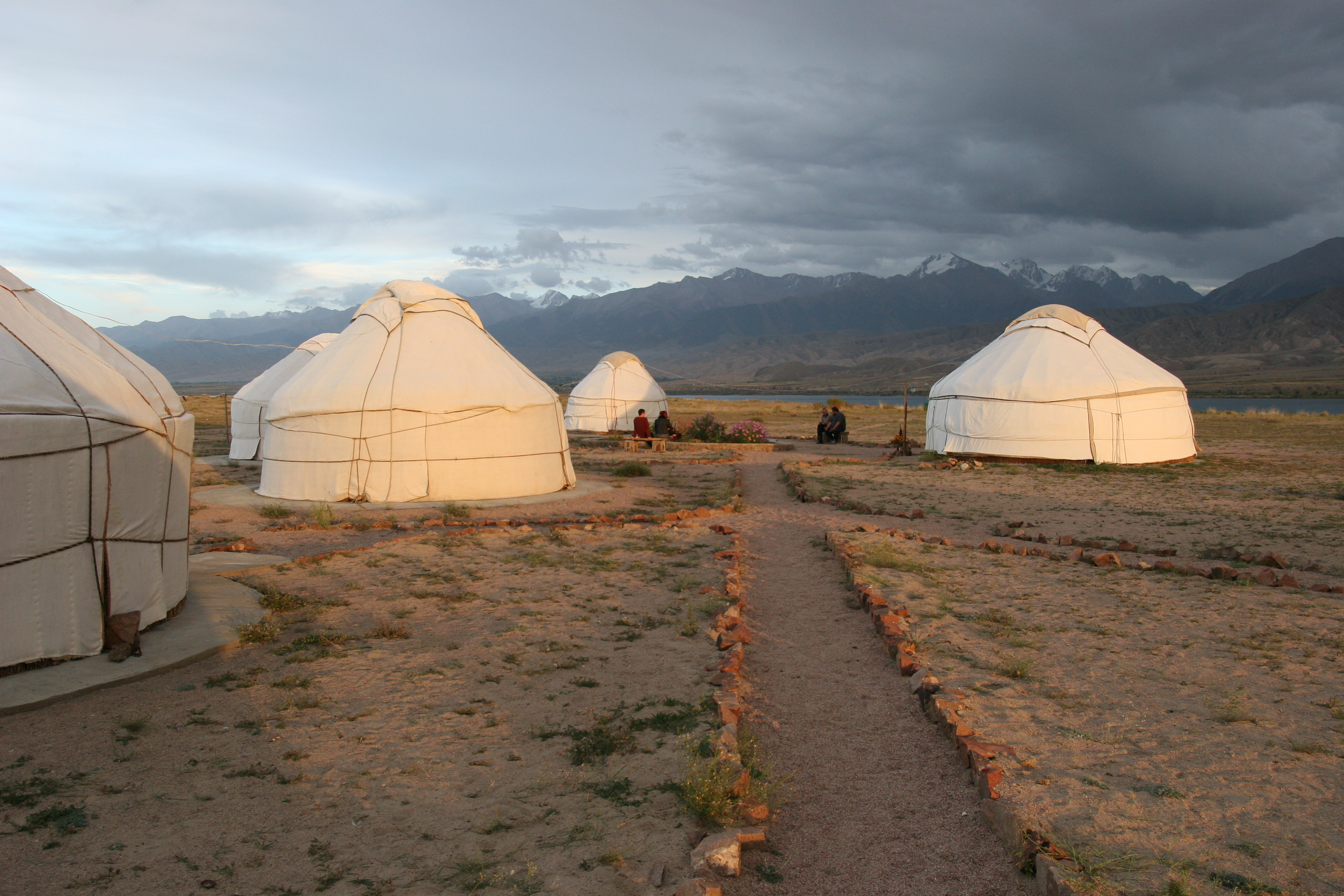
A Yurt camp on the shores of Lake Issyk-Kul

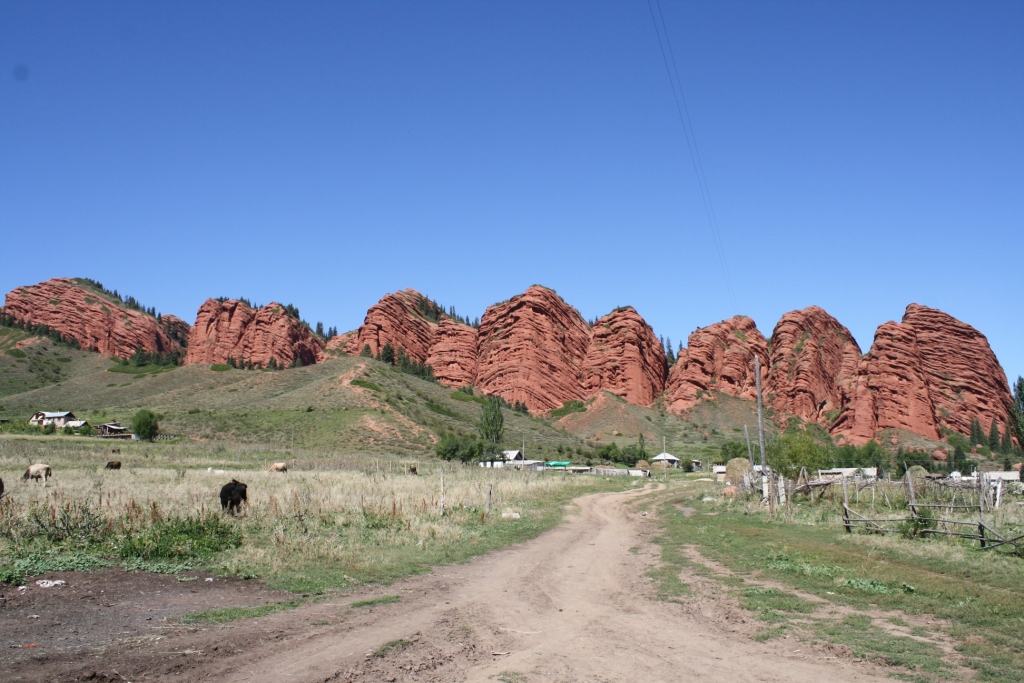
Jeti-Ögüz Rocks
