= List of rivers of the Issyk-Kul =

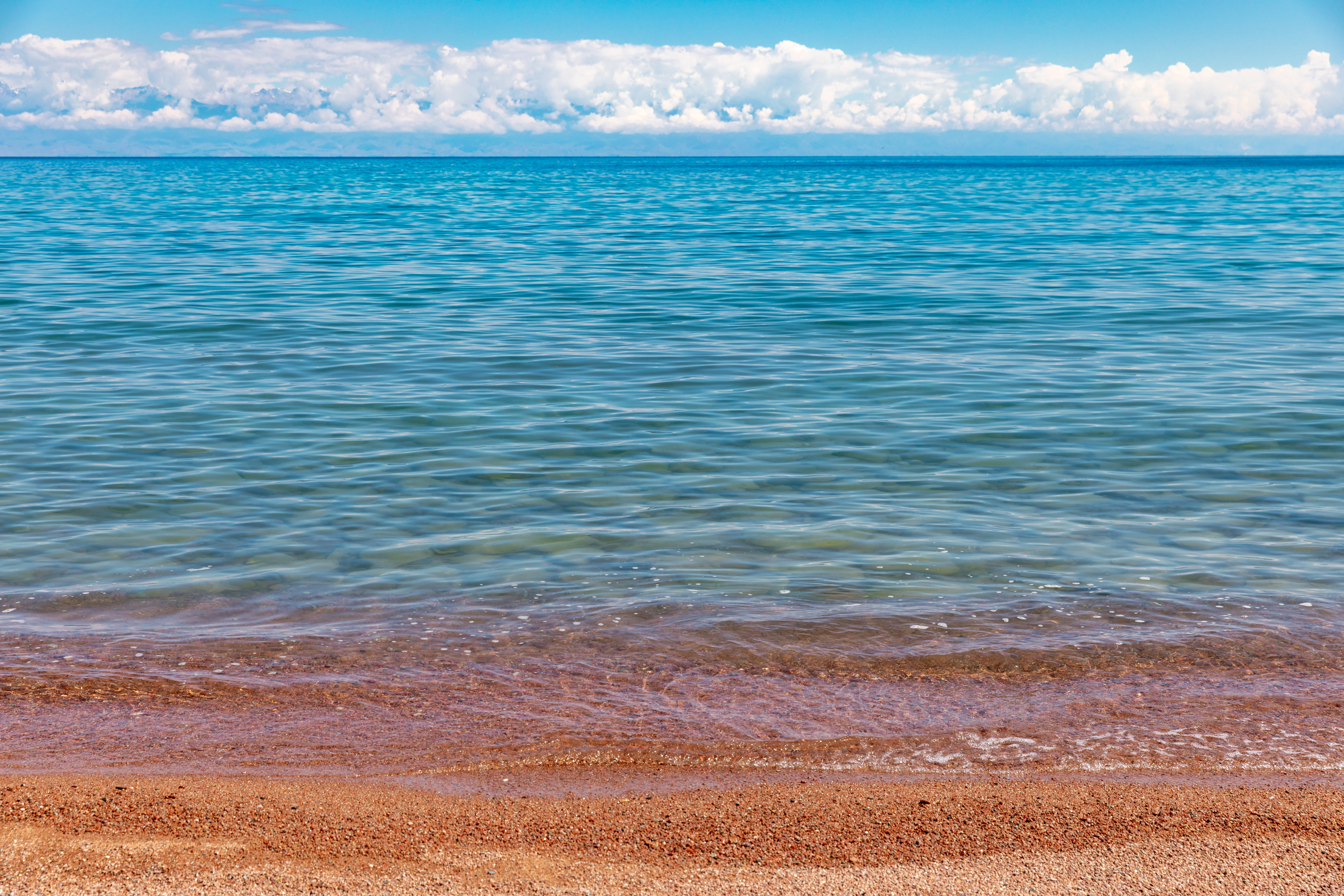
Issyk-Kul Lake

This list of rivers of Issyk Kul includes rivers draining into lake Issyk-Kul in Kyrgyzstan. It is reported that the basin of Issyk-Kul encounter 1,976 river and streams with a total length of 7,139 km. Of them, 1,842 streams are shorter than 10 km with a total length of 4,241 km (or 59%), and 106 streams range from 10 to 25 km in length totaling 1,708 km (or 24%). There are 24 small rivers with length varying between 25 and 50 km (the total is 853 km or 12%), and 3 medium-size rivers (51–100 km ) with a total length of 217 km (4%). Finally, there is only one comparatively large Tyup river with a length of 120 km, which is 1% of total length. Overall, 118 streams and rivers flow into the lake.

In the table below, the rivers are listed clockwise from the northeast.

River	Length, km	Watershed area, km^{2}	Source	District
Tüp	120	1180	Terskey Alatau	Ak-Suu, Tüp
Jyrgalang	97	2070	Terskey Alatau	Ak-Suu
Karakol	50	394	Terskey Alatau	Ak-Suu
Yrdyk	28	300	Terskey Alatau	Jeti-Ögüz
Jeti-Ögüz	52	387	Terskey Alatau	Jeti-Ögüz
Chong Kyzylsuu	48	340	Terskey Alatau	Jeti-Ögüz
Kichi Kyzylsuu	37	139	Terskey Alatau	Jeti-Ögüz
Juuku	63	590	Terskey Alatau	Jeti-Ögüz
Chychkan (Jeti Oguz)			Terskey Alatau	Jeti-Ögüz
Ak-Terek (Jeti Oguz)			Terskey Alatau	Jeti-Ögüz
Chong Jargylchak	25	137	Terskey Alatau	Jeti-Ögüz
Barskoon	62	352	Terskey Alatau	Jeti-Ögüz
Tamga	27	162	Terskey Alatau	Jeti-Ögüz
Tosor	30	304	Terskey Alatau	Jeti-Ögüz, Tong
Akterek	35	722	Terskey Alatau	Tong
Tong	36	742	Terskey Alatau	Tong
Akterek			Terskey Alatau	Tong
Tuurasuu	46	593	Terskey Alatau	Tong
Toraygyr	30	175	Kungey Alatau	Issyk-Kul
Chong Ak-Suu	31	337	Kungey Alatau	Issyk-Kul
