= Arashan (river) =

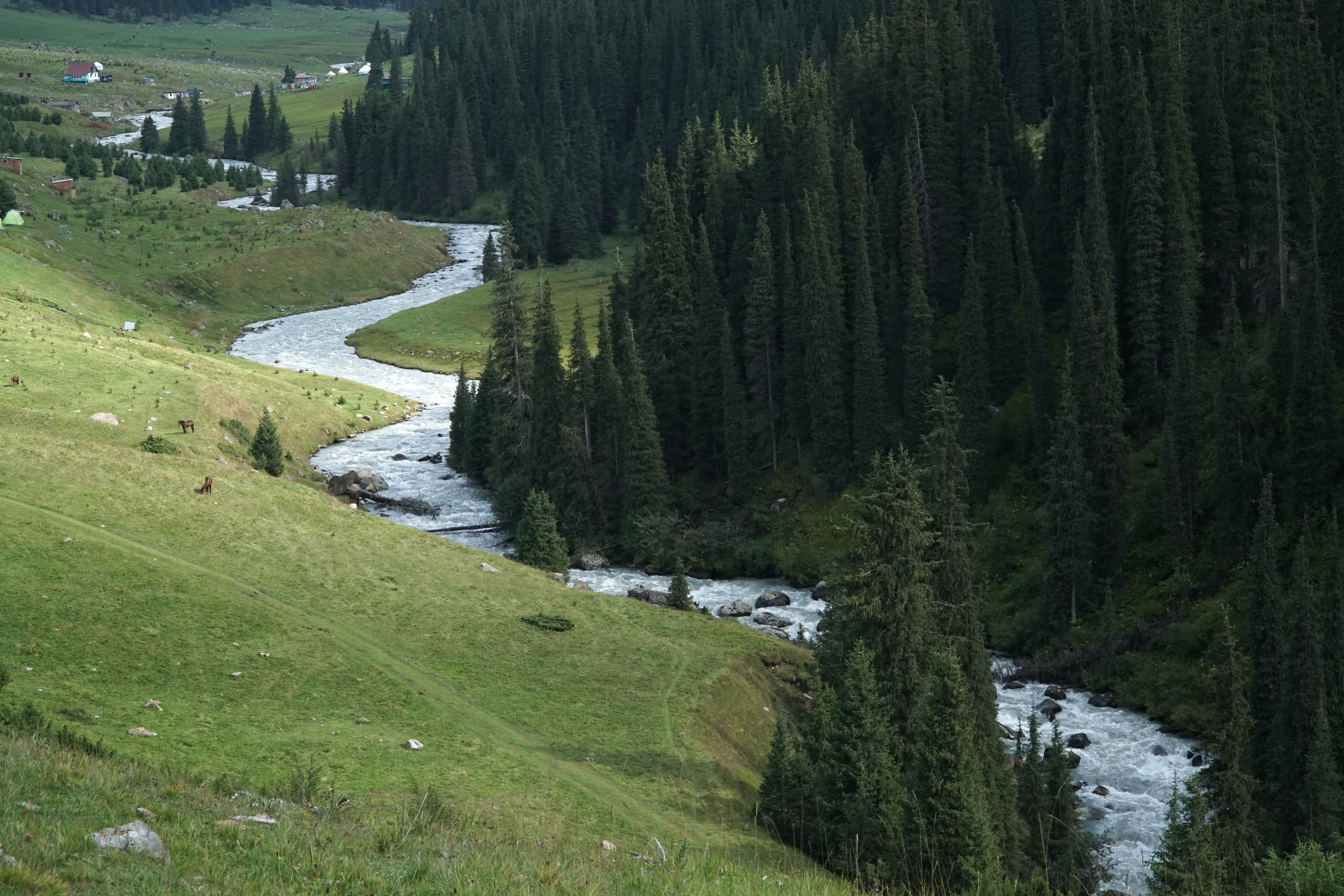

Location
- Country: Kyrgyzstan

Physical characteristics
- Source: Terskey Alatau
- Mouth: Ak-Suu
  - coordinates: 42.4736°N 78.5316°E

Basin features
- Progression: Ak-Suu→ Jyrgalang→ Issyk-Kul

The Arashan (Kyrgyz: Арашан) is a river in the Ak-Suu District, Issyk Kul Region, northeastern Kyrgyzstan. It flows north from the Terskey Alatau mountains, near Karakol and Issyk Kul Lake. It flows through Altyn Arashan, a mountain resort of hot springs and forested valley. The Palatka Glacier looms over the river and valley. It flows into the river Ak-Suu, a tributary of the Jyrgalang.
