= Karakol Nature Park =

National park in Issyk-Kul, Kyrgyzstan

- Kyrgyz: Каракол мамлекеттик жаратылыш паркы
- IUCN category II (national park)
- Location within Kyrgyzstan
- Location: Ak-Suu District, Issyk-Kul Region, Kyrgyzstan
- Nearest city: Karakol
- Coordinates: 42°19′N 78°29′E
- Area: 38,095 ha (94,130 acres)
- Established: 1997

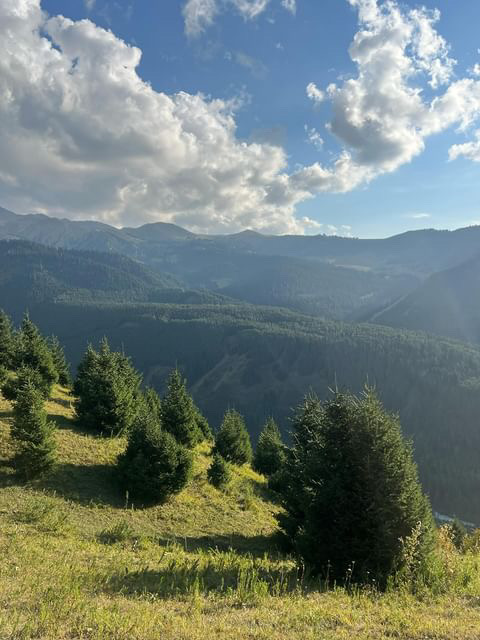
A photo of vegetation in the park

Karakol Nature Park (Kyrgyz: Каракол мамлекеттик жаратылыш паркы) is a national park in Ak-Suu District of Issyk-Kul Region of Kyrgyzstan established in April 1997. The purpose of the park is conservation of the unique nature complexes, forests, and flora and fauna of special ecological and aesthetic value for beneficial combination of natural and cultural landscapes and their use for recreational, cultural and educational purposes. It covers 38,095 ha (94,130 acres). The park is located 6 km from the regional center Karakol and 336 km from Bishkek.

The nature park is situated on the north side of the Teskey Alatoo range, in the eastern part of the Issyk-Kul valley. It features the Karakol Gorge, formed by the Karakol river, and the pretty alpine lake Ala Köl.

== Geography ==
Karakol State Nature Park is located in the southwestern part of Ak-Suu District in Issyk-Kul Region, eastern Kyrgyzstan.The park occupies part of the northern slopes of the Teskey Ala-Too Range, within the Tian Shan mountain system, and lies in the drainage basin of the Karakol River. Its northern boundary approaches the city of Karakol, while the southern part extends towards the main ridge of the Teskey Ala-Too.

The park extends across a pronounced altitudinal gradient from the foothills of the Issyk-Kul basin to high mountain ridges, glaciers and alpine terrain. The surrounding Issyk-Kul forest vegetation region ranges from approximately 1,608 m (5,276 ft), near the level of Lake Issyk-Kul, to elevations of 4,500 to 5,000 m (14,800 to 16,400 ft) in the high mountains.

== Climate ==
The climate is strongly continental, but varies substantially with altitude, slope aspect and topography. Temperatures generally decrease with elevation, while precipitation and atmospheric humidity increase towards the higher mountain belts. North-facing slopes are cooler and wetter than south-facing slopes. The average frost-free period is about 140 days and decreases by approximately five to six days for every 100 m (330 ft) increase in elevation.

Precipitation generally increases with elevation, and the spruce-forest belt lies in a zone of comparatively high moisture. Snow cover is greatest on gentle and north-facing slopes, in valleys and gorges, and beneath the forest canopy, while exposed south-facing slopes may retain little snow and can be used as winter pastures. Winds are generally moderate, although strong downslope winds directed towards Issyk-Kul can occasionally reach 30 to 40 m/s (110 to 140 km/h; 67 to 89 mph).

== Relief ==
The park forms part of the northern slope of the Teskey Ala-Too Range, which extends in an east-west direction along the southern side of the Issyk-Kul basin. The relief is highly varied and includes broad depressions and foothills, narrow mountain valleys with fast-flowing rivers, steep rocky slopes, deeply dissected gorges and sharp watershed ridges. The highest parts of the range contain firn fields and glaciers.

All forest areas within the park are mountain forests. With increasing elevation, the lower forest and meadow-steppe landscapes pass into a subalpine belt characterized by herbaceous vegetation and creeping juniper, followed by alpine meadows at higher elevations.

== Soils ==
Soil distribution within the park is strongly controlled by altitudinal zonation, reflecting corresponding changes in climate and vegetation. Mountain-valley light chestnut soils occur at lower elevations, while dark chestnut soils are developed higher on the mountain slopes. Mountain chernozems occur mainly on north-facing slopes, and brown mountain-forest soils are associated with the spruce-forest belt.

The source describes light chestnut soils at approximately 1,300 to 1,600 m (4,300 to 5,200 ft), dark chestnut soils at 1,700 to 2,000 m (5,600 to 6,600 ft), and mountain chernozems mainly at 1,900 to 2,500 m (6,200 to 8,200 ft). Brown mountain-forest soils associated with spruce forests occur broadly between approximately 1,800 and 2,700 m (5,900 and 8,900 ft). Above the forest belt, mountain meadow-steppe soils are characteristic of the subalpine zone.

Mountain-forest soils developed on carbonate rocks occur locally and may contain high concentrations of humus, with a neutral to alkaline reaction. The park contains numerous soil variants differing in profile depth, degree of erosion, stoniness, skeletal material, texture and the occurrence of exposed bedrock.

== Hydrology ==
The park lies within the basin of the Karakol River, which, together with numerous tributary streams, forms a well-developed mountain drainage network. The rivers and streams are typical high-gradient mountain watercourses with rapid flow.

The Karakol River is fed primarily by meltwater from high-altitude snowfields and glaciers. Seasonal snowmelt from mountain slopes, including those covered by spruce forest, also contributes to surface and subsurface runoff, while rainfall and groundwater make a smaller contribution.

About 19 km (12 mi) of the Karakol River lies within the boundaries of the park. The river ultimately flows into Issyk-Kul. Because of its steep gradient and rapid current, it is unsuitable for navigation.

Ala-Köl is located within the park and is of both hydrological and recreational importance. Narrow strips of marshy floodplain occur locally along watercourses, supporting meadow and wetland vegetation dominated in places by small sedges.
