= Jeti-Oguz =

Jeti-Ögüz ("Жети-өгүз" in Kyrgyz meaning "seven bulls") may refer to:

- Jeti-Ögüz Rocks, a rock formation in Kyrgyzstan
- Jeti-Ögüz resort, Kyrgyzstan, near the rock formation
- Jeti-Ögüz village, a village near the rock formation
- Jeti-Ögüz District, a region of Issyk Kul Province in Kyrgyzstan, where the village and rock formation are located
- Jeti-Ögüz (river), a river in Jeti-Ögüz District
- Jeti-Ögüz Game Reserve, a protected area in Jeti-Ögüz District
