= Tong (river) =

- Native name: Тоң суусу (Kyrgyz)

Location
- Country: Kyrgyzstan
- Region: Issyk-Kul Region
- District: Tong District

Physical characteristics
- Source: Teskey Ala-Too
- Mouth: Issyk-Kul
  - coordinates: 42°10′02″N 76°55′58″E
  - elevation: 1,620 m (5,310 ft)
- Length: 36 km (22 mi)
- Basin size: 81 km^{2} (31 sq mi)
- Discharge
  - average: 2.15 m^{3}/s (76 cu ft/s)

Basin features
- Tributaries
  - left: Bor-Dobo, Ak-Tash, Ak-Sai
  - right: Angi-Sai, Korumdu, Zindan

The Tong (Kyrgyz: Тоң суусу) is a river in Tong District of Issyk-Kul Region of Kyrgyzstan. It rises on north slopes of Teskey Ala-Too Range and flows into the Tong Bay of the lake Issyk-Kul. The length of the river is 36 km (22 mi), and its basin area is 81 km^{2} (31 sq mi). Average annual discharge is 2.15 m^{3}/s (76 cu ft/s). The river is used for irrigation. The river flows in vicinity of settlements Bökönbaev and Tört-Kül .
