= Yrdyk =

- Native name: Ырдык (Kyrgyz)

Location
- Country: Kyrgyzstan

Physical characteristics
- Source: Teskey Ala-Too Range
  - location: Jeti-Ögüz District
- Mouth: Issyk-Kul
  - coordinates: 42°33′34″N 78°14′21″E
- Length: 28 km (17 mi)
- Basin size: 300 km^{2} (120 mi^{2})
- Discharge
  - average: 1.32 m^{3}/s (47 cu ft/s)
  - maximum: 5.72 m^{3}/s (202 cu ft/s)

Basin features
- Tributaries
  - left: Kyzyl-Jar

The Yrdyk (Kyrgyz: Ырдык, Russian: Ырдык) is a river in Jeti-Ögüz District of Issyk-Kul Region of Kyrgyzstan. It rises on north slopes of Teskey Ala-Too Range and flows into lake Issyk-Kul. The length of the river is 28 km (17 mi) and the basin area 300 square kilometres (120 mi^{2}). It is fed by majorly snow and ice meltwater (85%) and rains (15%). Average annual discharge is 1.32 m^{3}/s (47 cu ft/s). The maximum flow is 5.72 m^{3}/s (202 cu ft/s) in June, and the minimum - 0.29 m^{3}/s (10 cu ft/s) in February. The flood flows may reach 30 m^{3}/s (1,100 cu ft/s). Several breakthrough-prone lakes including Akkel, Karakel and Jashylkel are located in the basin of Yrdyk posing a risk of floods and mudflows. Yrdyk village is located near the river.
