= Tosor =

River in Kyrgyzstan

- Native name: Kyrgyz: Тосор

Location
- Country: Kyrgyzstan
- Region: Issyk-Kul Region
- Districts: Tong and Jeti-Ögüz

Physical characteristics
- Source: Teskey Ala-Too Range
  - location: Northern slopes
  - coordinates: 41°57′03″N 77°21′15″E
  - elevation: 3,770 m (12,370 ft)
- Mouth: Issyk-Kul
  - coordinates: 42°10′30″N 77°23′40″E
  - elevation: 1,600 m (5,200 ft)
- Length: 30 km (19 mi)
- Basin size: 304 km^{2} (117 sq mi)
- Discharge
  - average: 2.28 m^{3}/s (81 cu ft/s)
  - minimum: 0.4 m^{3}/s (14 cu ft/s)
  - maximum: 65 m^{3}/s (2,300 cu ft/s)

Basin features
- River system: Issyk-Kul basin
- Tributaries
  - left: Toguzbulak, Tegerek
  - right: Bugumuyuz, Choloktor

The Tosor (Kyrgyz: Тосор) is a river in Tong and Jeti-Ögüz districts, Issyk-Kul Region, Kyrgyzstan. It originates on the northern slopes of the Teskey Ala-Too Range and flows into Issyk-Kul. The river is 30 km (19 mi) long, and its drainage basin covers 304 km^{2} (117 sq mi).

== Course ==
The Tosor rises at an elevation of approximately 3,770 m (12,370 ft) and descends to Issyk-Kul at approximately 1,600 m (5,200 ft). Its left tributaries include the Toguzbulak and Tegerek, while its right tributaries include the Bugumuyuz and Choloktor.

== Hydrology ==
The river is fed mainly by snowmelt and glacier meltwater, which together account for 85% of its flow; rainfall contributes the remaining 15%. Its average annual discharge is 2.28 m^{3}/s (81 cu ft/s), falling to approximately 1.0 m^{3}/s (35 cu ft/s) during the low-water period from January to March. The maximum recorded discharge is 65 m^{3}/s (2,300 cu ft/s), and the minimum is 0.4 m^{3}/s (14 cu ft/s).

== Human use ==
The Tosor is used for irrigation.

== Natural hazards ==
The Tosor basin contains moraine-glacial lakes identified as potentially hazardous in the Ministry of Emergency Situations' 2026 assessment. These include Chetindy and Tossor, classified in outburst-hazard category I, and Toguz-Bulak in category III. Potential outburst floods, debris flows and river flooding threaten roads, bridges, irrigation infrastructure and a hydrological gauging station.

== History and archaeology ==
The Tosor Palaeolithic site lies on the river's right bank, approximately 4 km (2 mi) from the southern shore of Issyk-Kul. It was discovered in 1965 by V. A. Ranov and M. B. Yunusaliev and excavated in 1971–1972. Further archaeological investigations took place in 2001 and 2024.
