= Burkan Lake =

Alpine lake in Kyrgyzstan

- Буркан көлү (Kyrgyz)
- Location in Kyrgyzstan
- Location: Teskey Alatoo, Inner Tian Shan, Kyrgyzstan
- Coordinates: 41°49′03.43″N 77°41′26.78″E
- Type: Glacial lake
- Primary outflows: Burkan River
- Basin countries: Kyrgyzstan
- Max. length: 1.5 km (0.93 mi)
- Max. width: 0.55 km (0.34 mi)
- Surface area: 0.493 km^{2} (0.190 sq mi)
- Max. depth: 10 m (33 ft)
- Water volume: 1.671×10^{6} m^{3} (1.355×10^{3} acre⋅ft)
- Surface elevation: 3,822 m (12,539 ft)

Burkan Lake (Kyrgyz: Буркан көлү) is an alpine lake in the Inner Tian Shan of Kyrgyzstan. It lies on the southern slope of the Teskey Alatoo, in the western part of the Arabel syrt, near Arabel Pass. Burkan Lake is one of the Arabel Lakes and is the only lake of the group belonging to the basin of the Kichi Naryn; the other Arabel Lakes belong to the basin of the Chong Naryn.The Burkan River flows out of the lake and forms one of the headwaters of the Kichi Naryn.

The lake lies at an elevation of 3,822 m (12,539 ft) and occupies a small depression extending from west to east. It is 1.5 km (0.93 mi) long and up to 0.55 km (0.34 mi) wide, with a surface area of 0.493 km^{2} (0.190 sq mi). Its water volume is 1.671×10^{6} m^{3} (1.355×10^{3} acre⋅ft), and its maximum depth is 10 m (33 ft).

Burkan Lake is fed by snowmelt and springs, and the Burkan River flows out of the lake. Its water level fluctuates by up to 1.5 m (4.9 ft). Parts of the shoreline are rocky, while other sections become marshy depending on the season. Water transparency reaches 3 m (9.8 ft). The lake basin was formed by glacial activity.
