= Balkhash marinka =

Conservation status
- Vulnerable (IUCN 3.1)

Scientific classification
- Kingdom: Animalia
- Phylum: Chordata
- Class: Actinopterygii
- Order: Cypriniformes
- Family: Cyprinidae
- Subfamily: Schizothoracinae
- Genus: Schizothorax
- Species: S. argentatus

Binomial name
- Schizothorax argentatus Kessler, 1874

Synonyms
- Racoma argentata (Kessler, 1874); Schizothorax orientalis Kessler, 1874; Schizothorax kolpakowskii Nikolskii, 1885; Schizothorax stummeri Lohberger, 1929; Schizothorax victorianus Nekrashevich, 1948

Species of fish

The Balkhash marinka (Schizothorax argentatus), is a species of ray-finned fish in the genus Schizothorax of the family Cyprinidae which is found in the Lake Balkhash basins in Kazakhstan and Xinjiang. It uses gravel substrates for spawning and the unshed roe is toxic.

== Biology ==
There are two distinct forms of the Balkhash marinka, a riverine form, and a faster growing migratory lacustrine form, however, both forms spawn in fast flowing currents over gravel beds. The females are sexually mature at 4-11 years of age, the males at 3–8 years old. They are a fecund species and may lay between 12,000 and 122,500 eggs, although normally 32,000 to 67,000 are laid in a spawning, the amount being dependent on the demographic make up of the spawning stock. Each egg is 2.3 mm in diameter. At a water temperatures ranging from 15 °C to 16 °C, and under controlled conditions, the eggs take 5 days to hatch. After six days from hatching the larval fish reach lengths of approximately 1 cm and has fully absorbed the yolk sac and starts to feed on plankton. By 25 days old they can be described as fry and have taken the form of small fish. When the fry grow to 16–30 mm they start to feed on small benthic animals and algae attached to the substrate. The unshed roe is toxic if consumed.

There are three feeding types of Balkhash marinka. The form which occurs in mountain rivers feeds mainly on benthic organisms and does not feed on flying insects as its lower jaw is adapted to scraping algae and vascular plants off the substrate. The form living in lakes is also mainly a plant feeder while the form found in larger rivers is frequently a predator, especially if there are no other predatory fish present. This predatory type feeds mostly on benthic organisms, flying insects and on small fish such as stone loaches, as well as small terrestrial animals which fall into the stream, including vertebrates such as lizards. The rate at which the fish grows is dependent on the habitat and feeding type with those in mountain streams rarely growing to more than 1 kg and it reaches sexual maturity at a weight of 100 to 300 g. The lake form tends to be somewhat heavier, usually weighing 1.5 kg, and some individuals may grow to weights of 5–6 kg. The riverine form which is a facultative predator can grow to up to 12 kg, although normally specimens weigh 2 to 5 kg.

== Distribution ==
The Balkhash marinka is found in lake Balkhash and the rivers of its catchment basin in Kazakhstan and in the Ili River in Xinjiang Province of western China. The form in Lake Issyk-Kul is regarded by some authorities as a separate taxon, the Issyk-Kul marinka Schizothorax pseudoaksaiensis issykkuli, which is a subspecies of the Ili marinka.

== Conservation ==
The Balkhash marinka has been assessed by the International Union for Conservation of Nature as a Vulnerable species as its stocks have drastically declined and the species has been extirpated from many of the smaller lakes within its range. The main threats for this species, and the other indigenous fish of Lake Balkhash are the introduction of exotic fish species such as trout and zander, habitat destruction and the unstable hydrological conditions.

== Aquaculture ==
The lacustrine form of Balkhash marinka, which feeds on mainly on plants, is the most suitable for growing in aquaculture, it adapts well to artificial feeding and can thrive on low-protein foods and can survive in cold water.
