= Tamga (disambiguation) =

A tamga (or tamgha) were seals and stamps used by Eurasian nomads.

Tamga may also refer to:

- Tamga hamulifera, an extinct genus of Ediacaran organism
- Tamga (river), a river in Kyrgyzstan

== See also ==
- Tagma
