= Balkhash =

Balkhash may refer to:

== Places ==
- Balkhash (city), a city at Lake Balkhash, Kazakhstan
- Balkhash Lake, a lake in Kazakhstan
- Balkhash Airport, an airport near city Balkhash, Kazakhstan
- Balkhash District, a district in Almaty Province, Kazakhstan
- Balkhash-Alakol Basin

== Species ==
- Balkhash perch, a species of perch found in Kazakhstan, Uzbekistan and China
- Balkhash marinka (Schizothorax argentatus), a species of ray-finned fish

== Other ==
- Balkhash, a ship of the Soviet Union, formerly the SS Manoa
