= Karakol River (Issyk-Kul) =

Karakol
- River Karakol in Karakol Gorge
- Native name: Kyrgyz: Каракол

Location
- Country: Kyrgyzstan
- Region: Issyk-Kul Region
- District: Ak-Suu District

Physical characteristics
- Source: Teskey Ala-Too Range
  - location: northern slope
- Mouth: Issyk-Kul
  - coordinates: 42°34′50.19″N 78°18′03.92″E
- Length: 50 km (31 mi)
- Basin size: 394 km^{2} (152 sq mi)
- Discharge
  - average: 6.60 m^{3}/s (233 cu ft/s)
  - minimum: 0.38 m^{3}/s (13 cu ft/s)
  - maximum: 57.6 m^{3}/s (2,030 cu ft/s)

Basin features
- River system: Issyk-Kul basin

The Karakol (Kyrgyz: Каракол) is a river in Ak-Suu District, Issyk-Kul Region, Kyrgyzstan. It originates on the northern slope of the Teskey Ala-Too Range and flows into Issyk-Kul. The river is 50 km (31 mi) long, and its drainage basin covers 394 km^{2} (152 sq mi).

== Course ==
In its upper reaches, the Karakol flows through a glaciated area. In its middle course, it flows through a spruce-covered gorge, while its lower course crosses a broad plain before reaching Issyk-Kul.

== Tributaries and lakes ==
The principal tributary of the Karakol is the Kashka-Suu. The river basin contains 27 tributaries with a combined length of 93 km (58 mi).

There are four lakes in the drainage basin with a combined area of 0.99 km^{2} (0.38 sq mi). The largest is Ala-Köl, with an area of 0.84 km^{2} (0.32 sq mi).

== Hydrology ==
The long-term average discharge of the Karakol is 6.60 m^{3}/s (233 cu ft/s). Its maximum discharge is 57.6 m^{3}/s (2,030 cu ft/s), while its minimum discharge is 0.38 m^{3}/s (13 cu ft/s).

The river begins its seasonal rise in late April, reaches its high-water period in July and August, and recedes by the end of September.

== Protected area ==
A 19 km section of the Karakol River flows through Karakol State Nature Park, established in 1997 to conserve valuable natural complexes, forests, flora and fauna, while supporting recreation, cultural activities and environmental education.

== Human use ==
The Karakol is widely used for irrigation and for supplying settlements with water. The city of Karakol and the village of Börü-Bash, and other settlements are situated along the river.
