= Jeti-Ögüz Game Reserve =

Protected area in Issyk-Kul Region, Kyrgyzstan

- IUCN category IV (habitat/species management area)
- Location within Kyrgyzstan
- Location: Kyrgyzstan
- Coordinates: 42°15′N 78°19′E
- Area: 31,610 ha (78,100 acres)
- Established: 1958

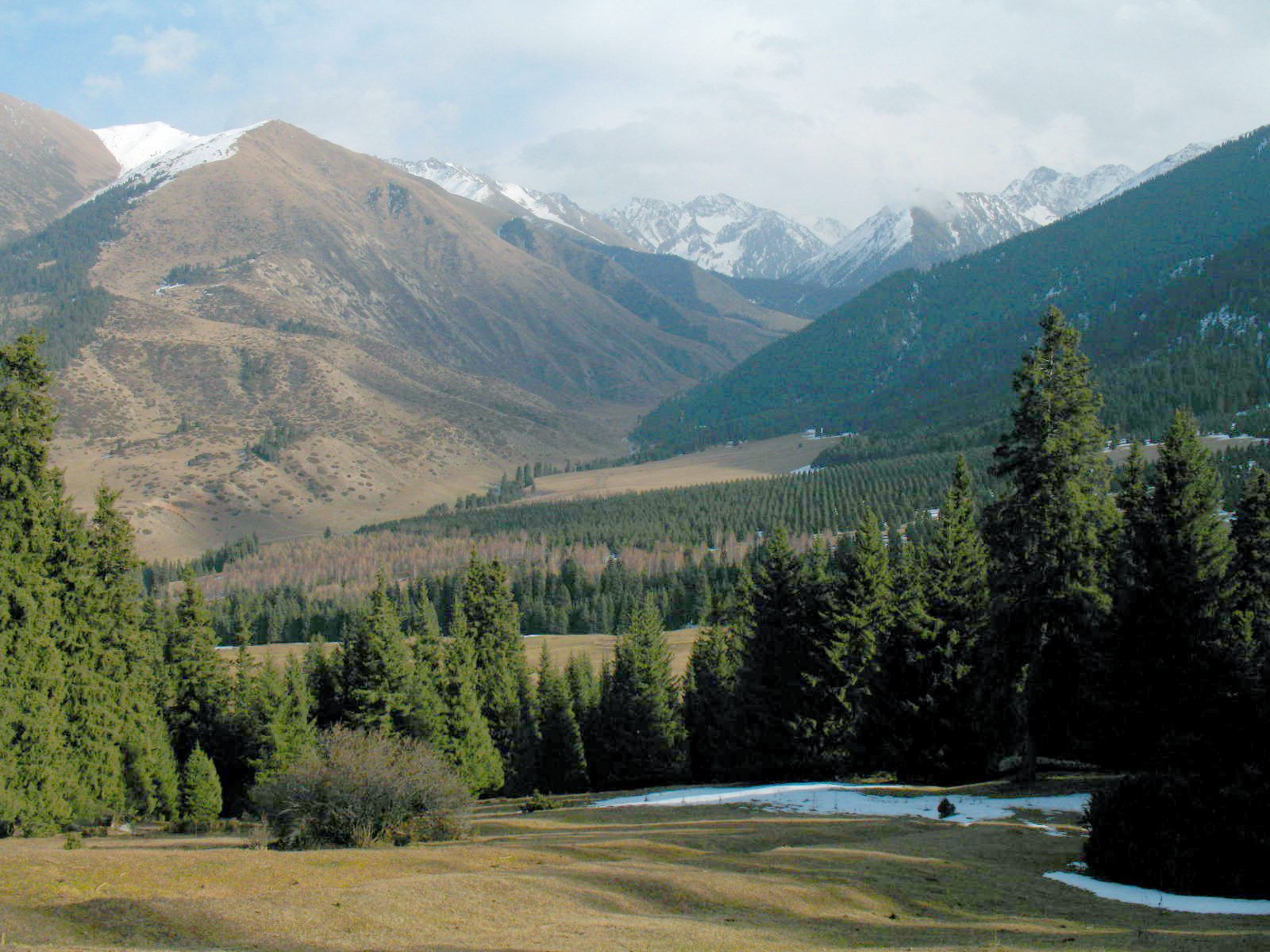
The Teskey Alatoo in the area surrounding Jeti-Ögüz, with visible pine-tree plantation.

Jeti-Ögüz Game Reserve (Kyrgyz: Жети-Өгүз зоологиялык (аң уулоочу) заказниги) is a protected area in Jeti-Ögüz District, Issyk-Kul Region, Kyrgyzstan. It is situated on the north slopes of the Teskey Alatoo mountain range, and occupies the basin of the river Jeti-Ögüz. Established in 1958, it covers 31,610 ha (78,100 acres).
