= Chong Jargylchak =

- Native name: Чоң Жаргылчак (Kyrgyz)

Location
- Country: Kyrgyzstan

Physical characteristics
- Source: Teskey Ala-Too Range
  - location: Jeti-Ögüz District
- Mouth: Issyk-Kul
  - coordinates: 42°11′21″N 77°38′29″E
- Length: 25 km (16 mi)
- Basin size: 137 km^{2} (53 sq mi)
- Discharge
  - average: 2.32 m^{3}/s (82 cu ft/s)
  - minimum: 0.22 m^{3}/s (7.8 cu ft/s)
  - maximum: 25.3 m^{3}/s (890 cu ft/s)

The Chong Jargylchak (Kyrgyz: Чоң Жаргылчак, Russian: Чон Джаргылчак) is a river in Jeti-Ögüz District of Issyk-Kul Region of Kyrgyzstan. It rises on north slopes of Teskey Ala-Too Range and flows into lake Issyk-Kul. The length of the river is 25 km (16 mi) and the basin area 137 square kilometres (53 sq mi). Average annual discharge is 2.32 m^{3}/s (82 cu ft/s). The maximum flow is 25.3 m^{3}/s (890 cu ft/s) and the minimum - 0.22 m^{3}/s (7.8 cu ft/s). According to recent study conducted by Central-Asian Institute for Applied Geosciences the average annual discharge of the river increased to 3.32 m^{3}/s (117 cu ft/s) (at gauging station Chong Jargylchak) over the period of 1994–2016, which is 153% higher than during monitoring period from 1940 to 1993, i.e. 2.16 m^{3}/s (76 cu ft/s) due to climate change factors.
