= Jeti-Ögüz village =

Jeti-Ögüz Жети-Өгүз (айыл)
- village
- Location within Kyrgyzstan
- Coordinates: 42°N 78°E
- Country: Kyrgyzstan
- Region: Issyk-Kul Region
- District: Jeti-Ögüz District

Population (2023)
  - Total: 3,986

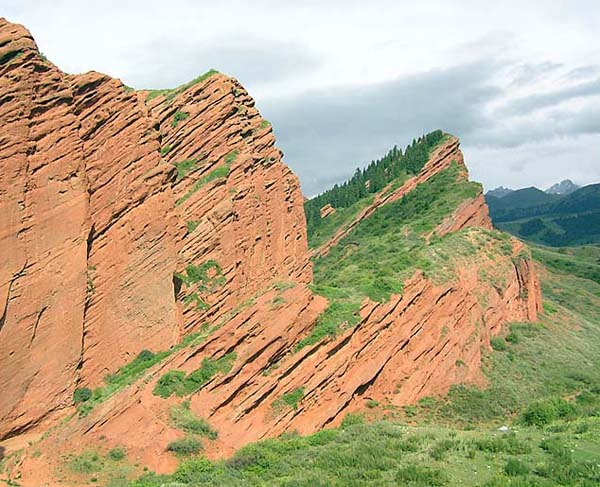
Seven Bulls rock formation near Jeti-Ögüz

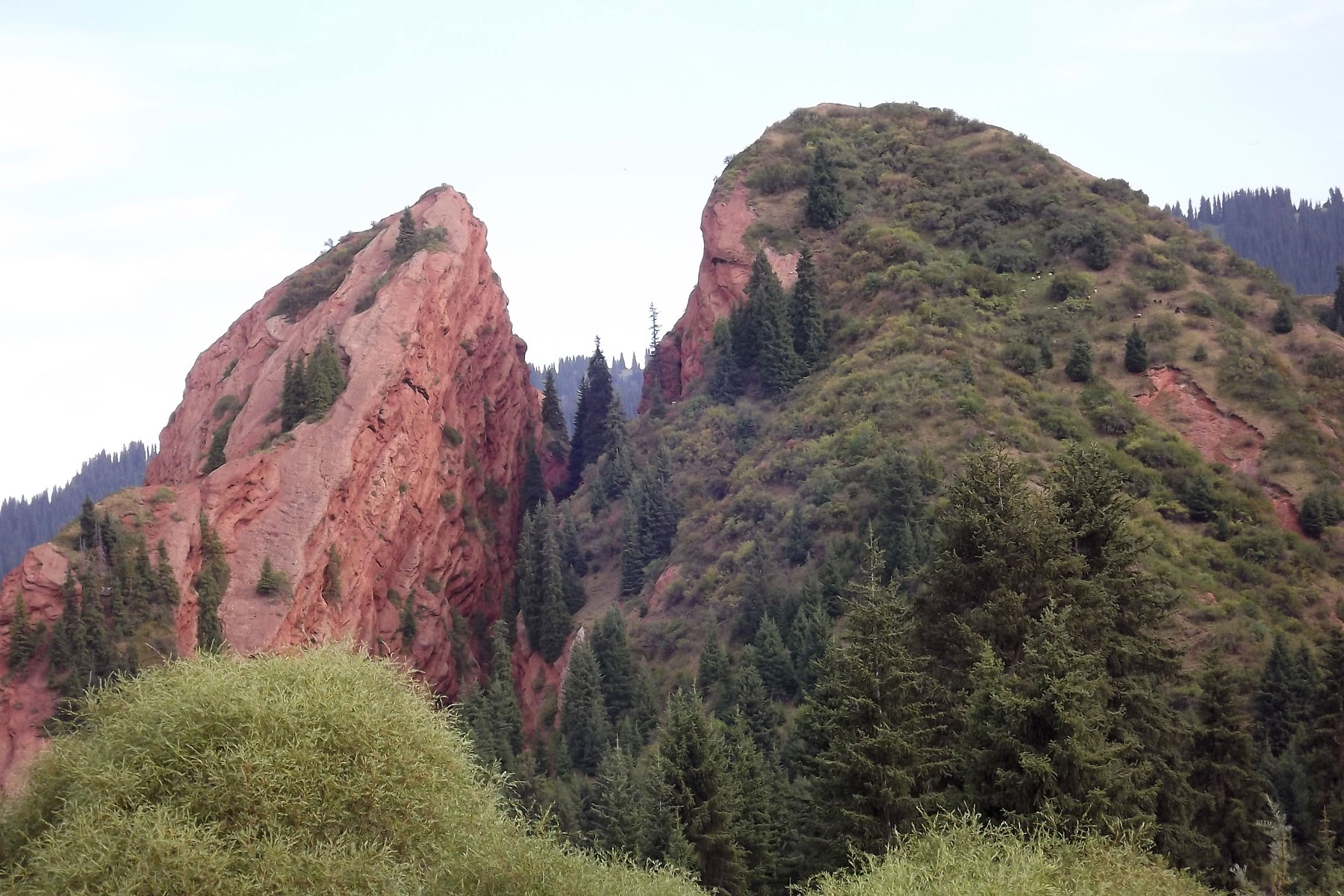
Broken Heart rock

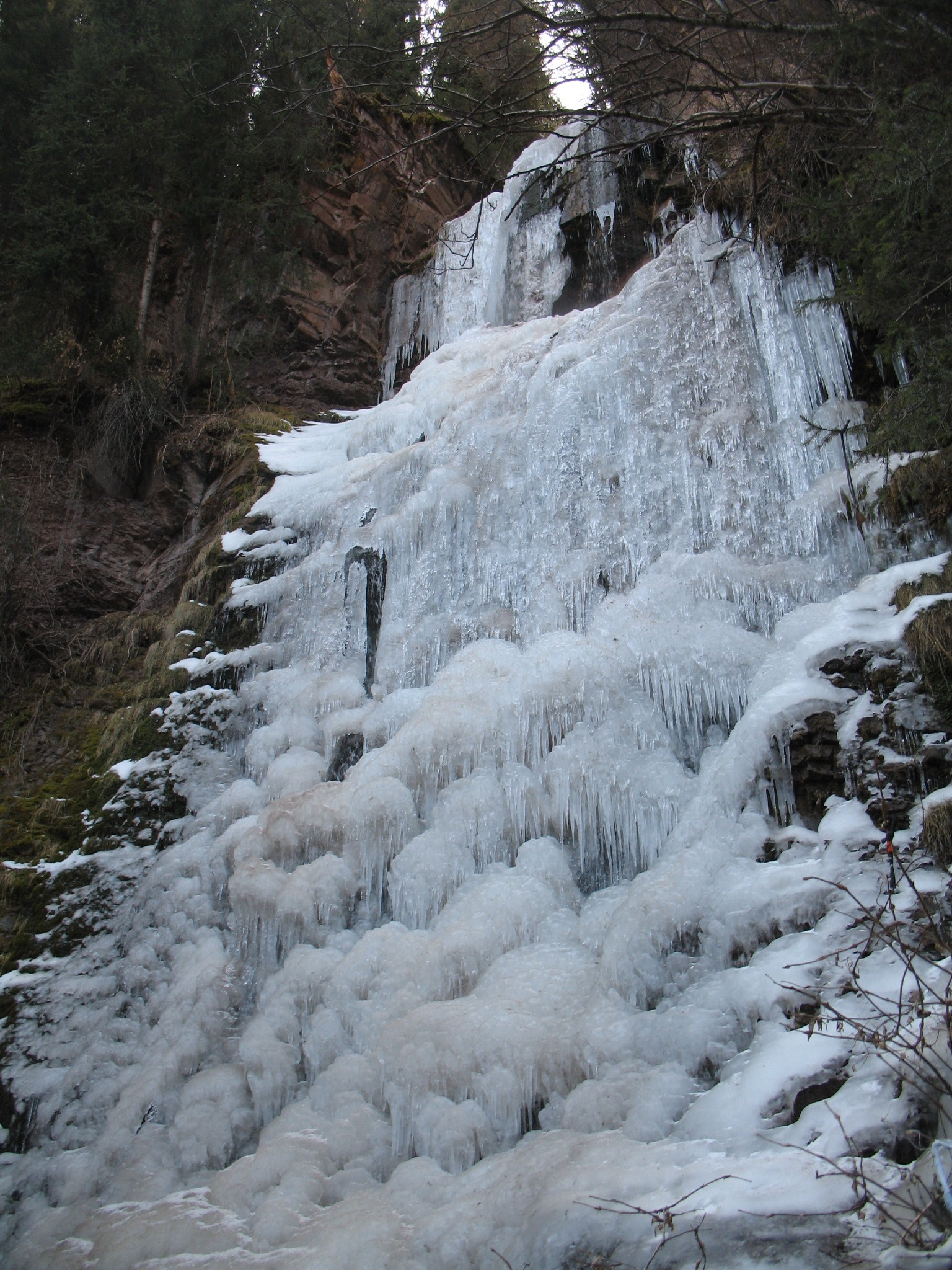
A waterfall in a gully in the mountains surrounding Jeti-Ögüz, frozen in the late fall

Jeti-Ögüz (Kyrgyz: Жети-Өгүз, romanized: Jeti-Ögüz, lit. 'seven bulls') is a village located at the north slope of Teskey Ala-Too mountain range near Issyk Kul in the Jeti-Ögüz District of Issyk-Kul Region of Kyrgyzstan. Its population was 3,986 in 2023.

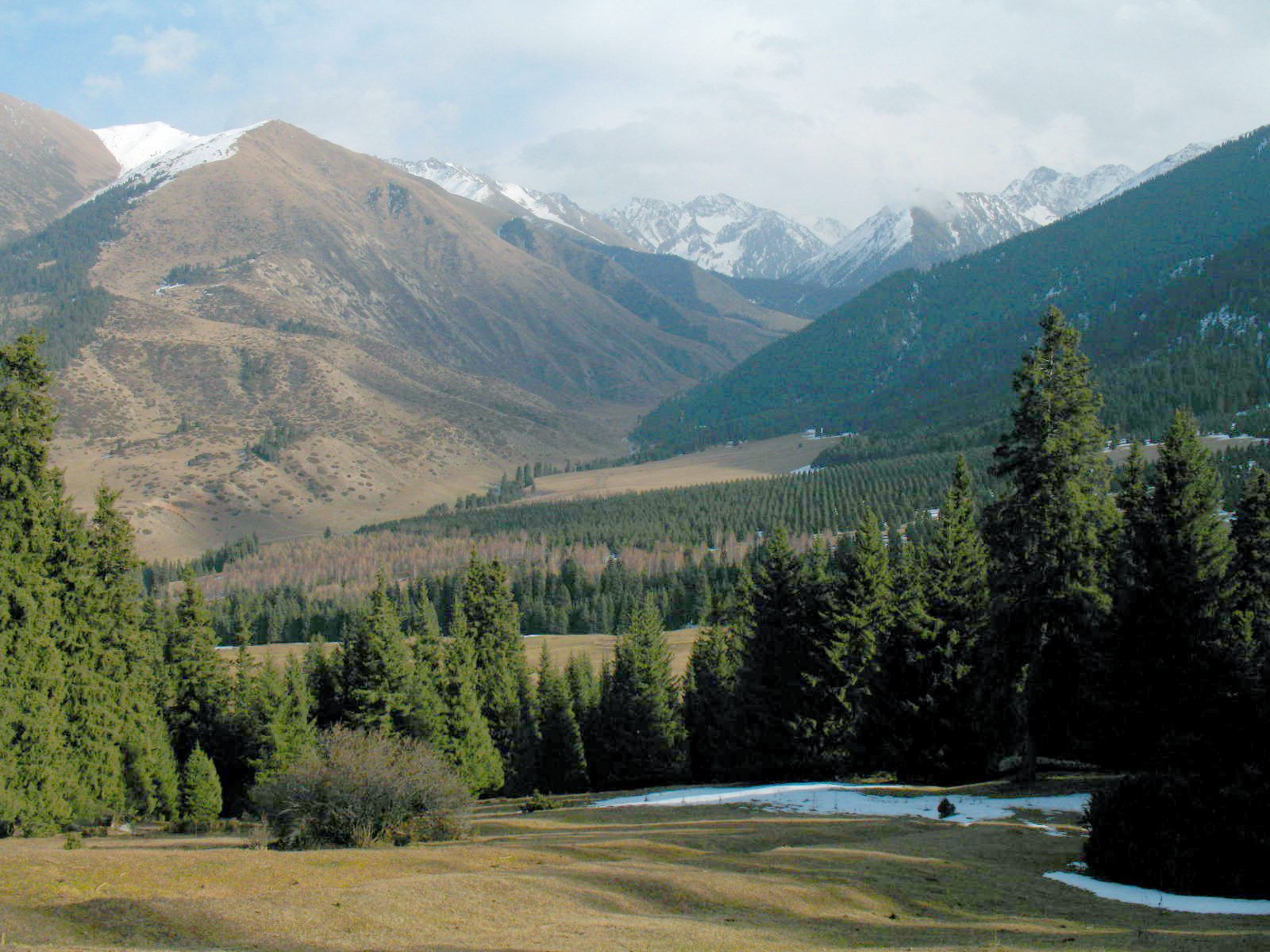
In the mountains surrounding Jeti-Ögüz, with visible pine-tree plantations

== History ==
The thermal springs of Jeti-Ögüz were known to local inhabitants since antiquity. The place became known to Europe after 1856 when Semenov-Tian-Shanskii first visited it. Since 1965 the resort operates year-round. In 1991, an important meeting between Boris Yeltsin and Askar Akayev took place in Jeti-Ögüz.
