= Jyrgalang =

Jyrgalang Жыргалаң
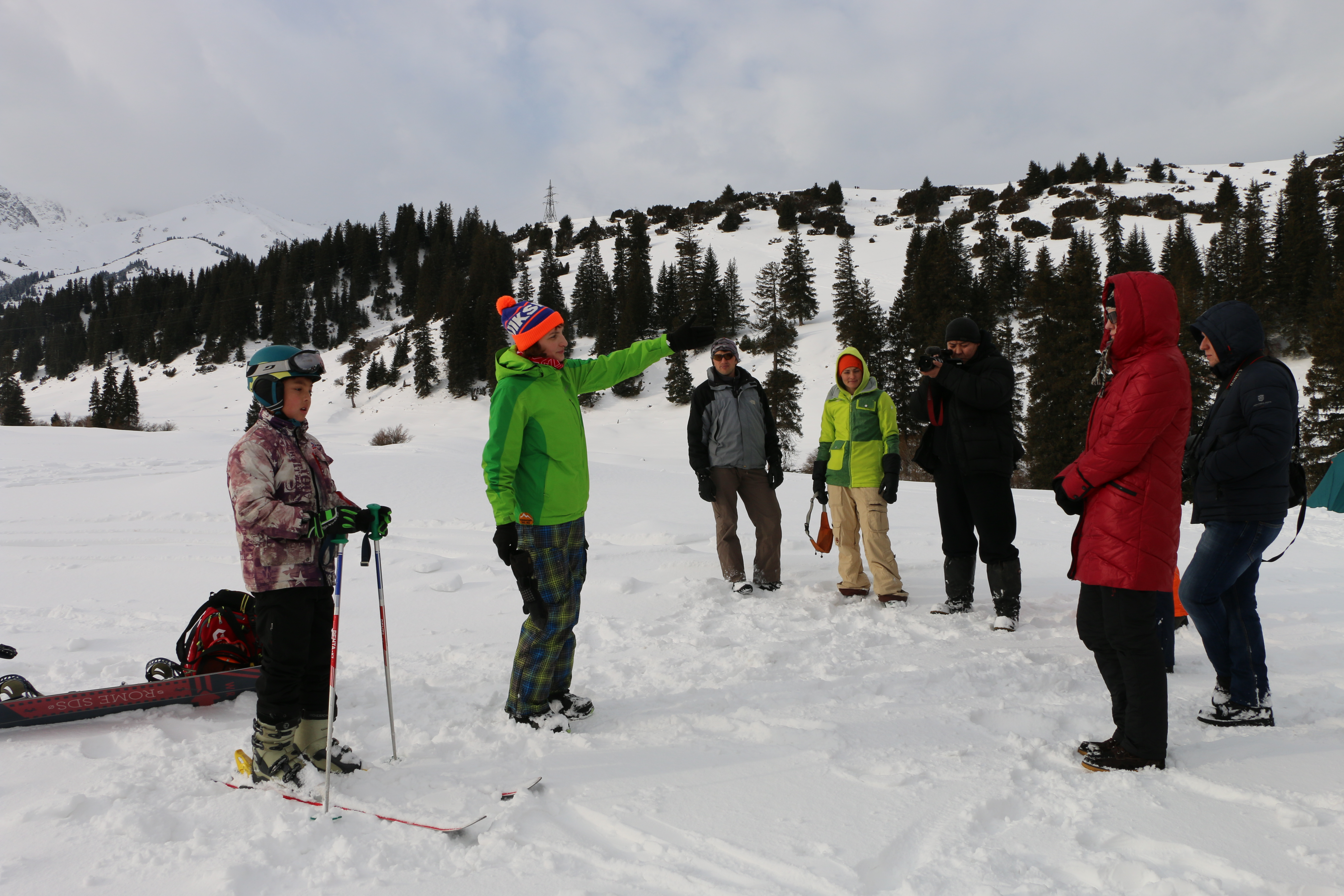
- Instructors train back country ski guides in avalanche safety

- Location within Kyrgyzstan
- Coordinates: 42°36′0″N 79°1′48″E
- Country: Kyrgyzstan
- Region: Issyk-Kul Region
- District: Ak-Suu District
- Elevation: 2,477 m (8,127 ft)

Population (2023)
  - Total: 1,033
- resident population
- Time zone: UTC+6

Jyrgalang (Kyrgyz: Жыргалаң, officially named Shakta Jyrgalang) is a village in the Ak-Suu District of Issyk-Kul Region of Kyrgyzstan. It is located at the right bank of the river Jyrgalang. It was established in 1964 to support operation of a coal mine Jyrgalan. Its population was 1,033 in 2021. Until 2012 it was an urban-type settlement. In recent years numerous residents have moved to Karakol in search of economic opportunities. The coal mine is still operating, albeit at relatively low levels. Since 2013 the village has seen some investments into guest house development including the reconstruction of an existing house into a six-room guest house and construction of a three-story guest house. Several other homes were renovated in 2016 to serve as guest houses for back-country skiers and hikers.

== Population ==
Historical population
| Year | Pop. | ±% p.a. |
|---|---|---|
| 1970 | 1,197 | — |
| 1979 | 1,482 | +2.40% |
| 1989 | 1,778 | +1.84% |
| 1999 | 1,391 | −2.42% |
| 2009 | 1,014 | −3.11% |
| 2021 | 1,033 | +0.15% |
Note: resident population; Sources:
