= Karakol Peak =

Mountain in Kyrgyzstan

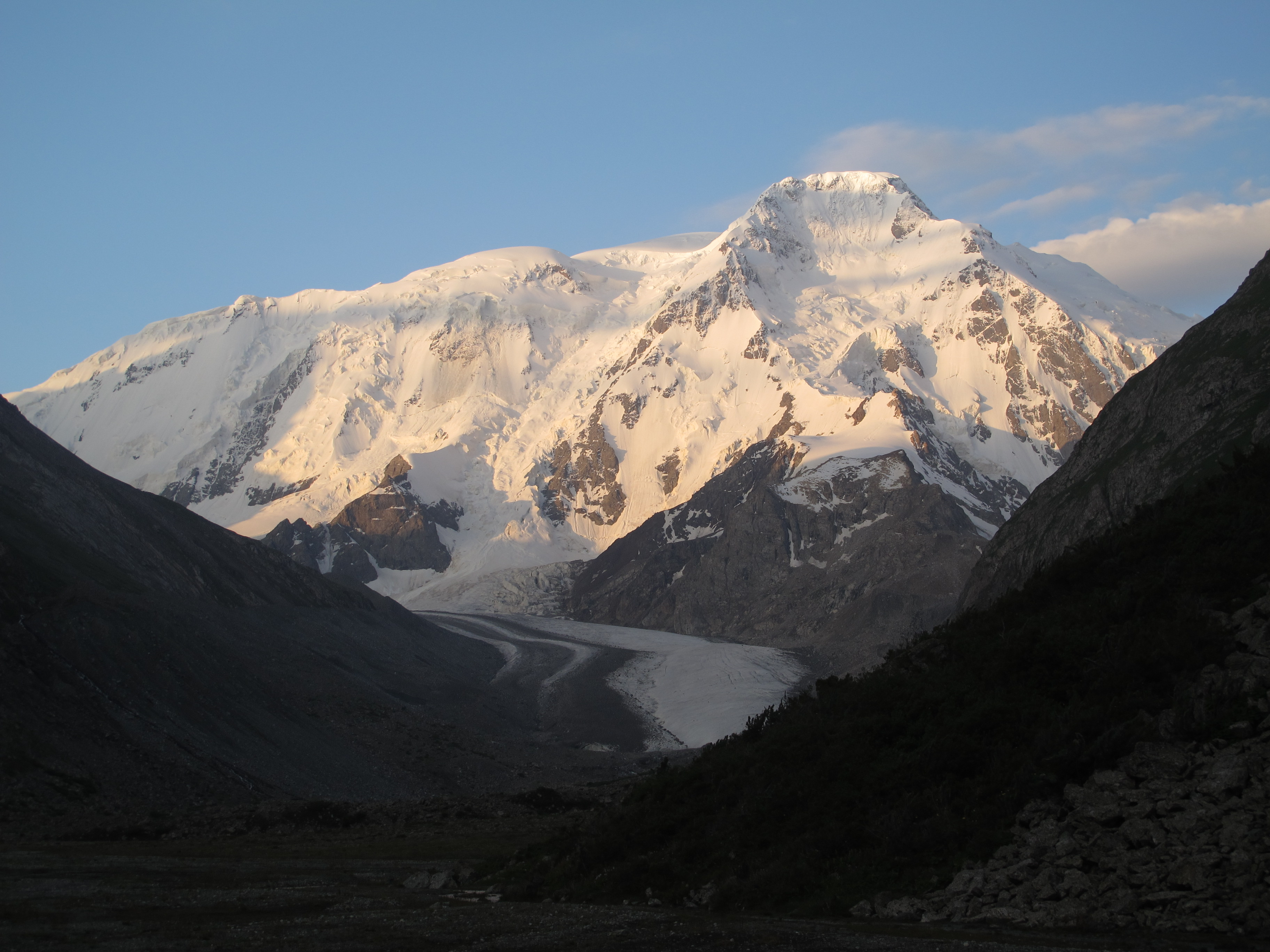
- Karakol Peak from the north

Highest point
- Elevation: 5,216 m (17,113 ft)
- Prominence: 1,673 m (5,489 ft)
- Coordinates: 42°10′7″N 78°28′19″E

Geography
- Location within Kyrgyzstan
- Location: Kyrgyzstan
- Parent range: Terskey Ala-too, Tian Shan

Karakol Peak (Kyrgyz: Каракол чокусу, romanized: Karakol çokusu) is a mountain in the Terskey Ala-Too of the Tian Shan. It is located in the Issyk-Kul Region in east Kyrgyzstan.

Karakol Peak is a prominent mountain located in the Terskey Ala-Too range of the Tian Shan Mountains in Kyrgyzstan. It is a popular destination for outdoor enthusiasts due to its scenic landscapes and accessibility via several trekking and horseback riding routes.

== Location and Accessibility ==
Karakol Peak is situated near the town of Karakol, a major hub for trekking in the Terskey Ala-Too range. The trails leading to the peak pass through alpine meadows, forests, and mountain streams. It is a highlight on various hiking and horseback riding routes in the region.

== Activities and Tourism ==
The area surrounding Karakol Peak offers opportunities for hiking, trekking, and horseback riding. Many visitors use the trails to explore the natural landscapes and experience Kyrgyzstan’s nomadic culture. The peak also provides panoramic views of nearby mountains and valleys, making it a popular stop for tourists.

== Conservation ==
Karakol Peak is part of the protected Terskey Ala-Too range, which is home to diverse flora and fauna. Local efforts focus on promoting eco-tourism and preserving the environment while supporting sustainable livelihoods for nearby communities.

== History ==
It was first climbed in 1937 by N. Popov, G. Beloglazov, V. Ratsek, and K. Baygazinov.
