= Chong Ak-Suu =

- Native name: Kyrgyz: Чоң Ак-Суу

Location
- Country: Kyrgyzstan
- Region: Issyk-Kul Region

Physical characteristics
- Source: confluence of the Aylama and Ayuu-Tör rivers
- Mouth: Issyk-Kul
  - coordinates: 42°39′22″N 77°28′09″E
  - elevation: 1604 m
- Length: 31 km (19 mi)
- Basin size: 337 km^{2} (130 sq mi)
- Discharge
  - location: near Grigor'yevka
  - average: 5.0 m^{3}/s (180 cu ft/s)
  - minimum: 1.4 m^{3}/s (49 cu ft/s)
  - maximum: 19.1 m^{3}/s (670 cu ft/s)

Basin features
- River system: Issyk-Kul basin
- Tributaries
  - left: Kulagan-Tash, Jindi-Suu
  - right: Kashka-Suu

The Chong Ak-Suu (Kyrgyz: Чоң Ак-Суу or Kyrgyz: Чоң Аксуу) is a river in Issyk-Kul Region of Kyrgyzstan. It originates on the southern slope of the Küngöy Ala-Too Range and flows into Issyk-Kul. The river is 31 km (19 mi) long, and its drainage basin covers 337 square kilometres (130 sq mi).

== Course ==
The Chong Ak-Suu is formed by the confluence of the Aylama and Ayuu-Tör rivers. In its upper reaches, it flows through moraine deposits left by ancient glaciers. After the confluence with the Jindi-Suu, the river flows through a narrow gorge.

== Tributaries ==
The Chong Ak-Suu has 16 small tributaries. Its principal tributaries are the Kasha-Suu on the right, and the Kulagan-Tash and Jindi-Suu on the left.

== Hydrology ==
The river is fed by glacier and snow meltwater. There are 48 glaciers in its drainage basin, with a total area of 48.9 km^{2} (18.9 sq mi).

The long-term average discharge near the village of Grigor'yevka is 5.0 m^{3}/s (180 cu ft/s), with a maximum discharge of 19.1 m^{3}/s (670 cu ft/s) and a minimum of 1.4 m^{3}/s (49 cu ft/s). The river begins its seasonal high-water period in late May and recedes in October.
