= Altyn Arashan =

Resort in Kyrgyzstan

Coordinates: 42.373°N 78.612°E

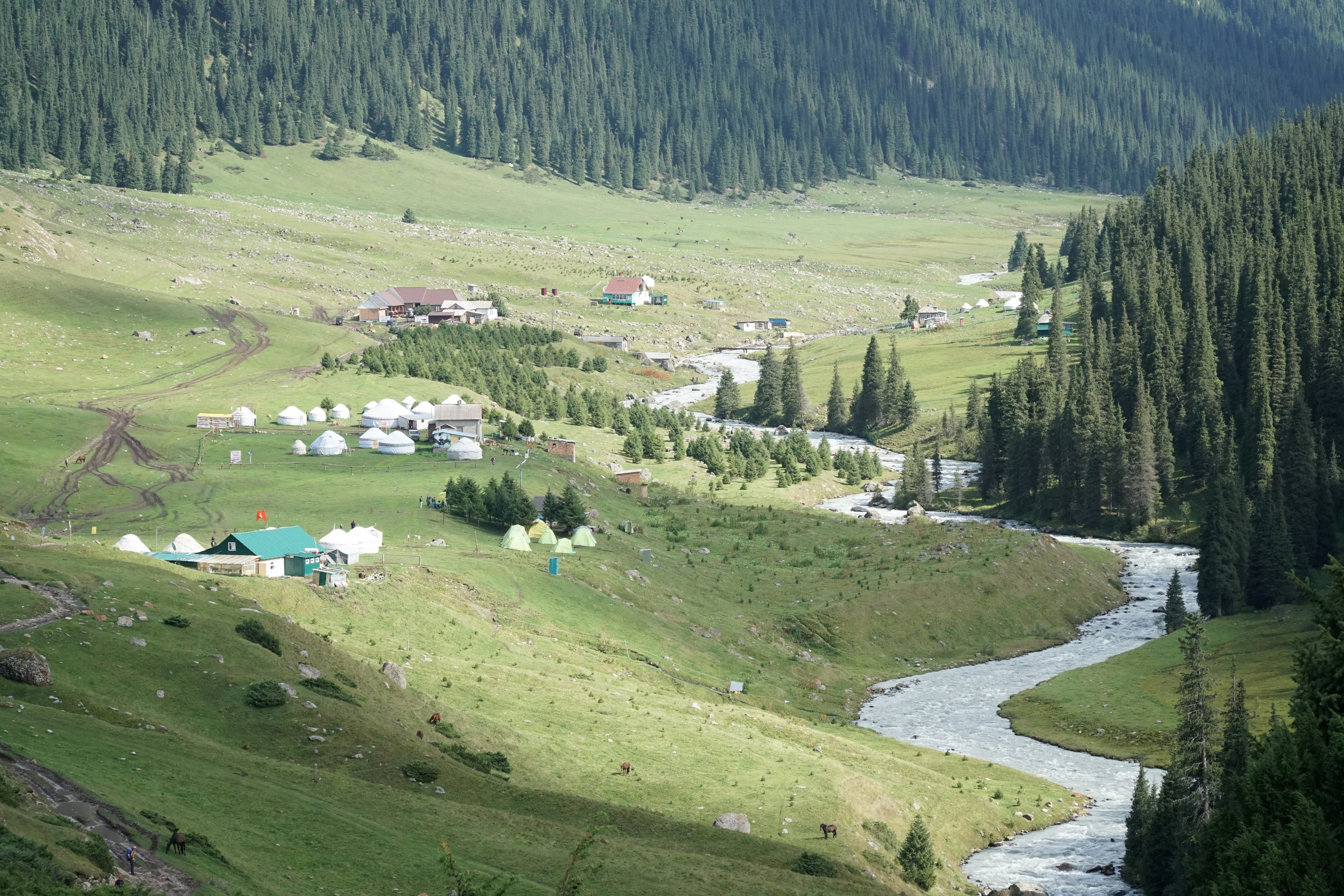
Altyn Arashan resort, Kyrgyzstan

Altyn Arashan (Golden Spa) is a valley and mountain resort near Karakol and Issyk Kul Lake, northeastern Kyrgyzstan. It lies along the trekking route from Teploklyuchenka (Ak-Suu). It is a hot spring development set in an alpine valley, containing the 5020 metre Pik Palatka in its southern part. It is said to "include three groups of nitric thermals springs on the right side of the Arashan River, 20 km southeast of Karakol mountain, situated in a picturesque forest landscape at an altitude of 2350-2435 metres." The resort has numerous wooden sheds which contain hot sulfurous pools to cure various ailments. The resort is set in a botanical research area called the Arashan State Nature Reserve which has about 20 snow leopards and several bears.
