= Tamga (river) =

- Native name: Тамга (Kyrgyz)

Location
- Country: Kyrgyzstan
- Region: Issyk-Kul Region
- District: Jeti-Ögüz District

Physical characteristics
- Source: Teskey Ala-Too
- Mouth: Issyk-Kul
  - coordinates: 42°09′20″N 77°31′25″E
  - elevation: 1,620 m (5,310 ft)
- Length: 27 km (17 mi)
- Basin size: 162 km^{2} (63 sq mi)
- Discharge
  - average: 1.10 m^{3}/s (39 cu ft/s)

The Tamga (Kyrgyz: Тамга) is a river in Jeti-Ögüz District of Issyk-Kul Region of Kyrgyzstan. It rises on north slopes of Teskey Ala-Too Range and flows into the lake Issyk-Kul. The length of the river is 27 km (17 mi), and its basin area is 162 km^{2} (63 sq mi). The river is mainly fed by ice and snow meltwater and precipitation. Average annual discharge is 1.10 m^{3}/s (39 cu ft/s). The maximum flow is in July–August and the minimum in January. The river is used for irrigation. Settlement Tamga is located near the river.
