= Tagma =

Tagma (from Greek τάγμα "something which has been ordered or arranged"; plural tagmata) may refer to:

- Tagma (biology), a grouping of segments, usually in arthropod anatomy
- Tagma (military), a subdivision of the Byzantine army
- Tagma (τάγμα), the Modern Greek term for an order (honour)
- Moha Tagma (born 1954), Moroccan diplomat

== See also ==
- Tamga (disambiguation)
- Tagmeme (linguistics)
