= Jeti-Ögüz (river) =

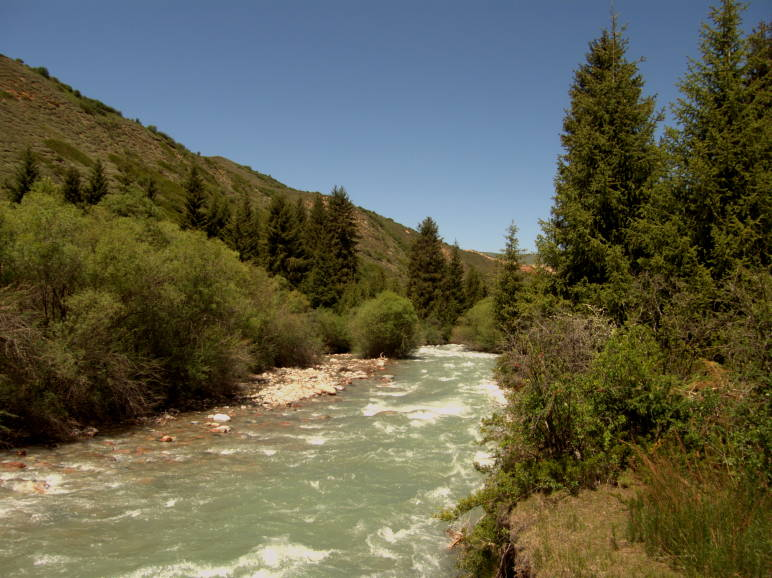
- View of Jeti-Ögüz river
- Native name: Жети-Өгүз суусу (Kyrgyz)

Location
- Country: Kyrgyzstan

Physical characteristics
- Source: Teskey Ala-Too Range
  - location: Jeti-Ögüz District
- Mouth: Issyk-Kul
  - coordinates: 42°31′06″N 78°04′19″E
- Length: 52 km (32 mi)
- Basin size: 387 km^{2} (149 sq mi)
- Discharge
  - average: 5.6 m^{3}/s (200 cu ft/s)
  - maximum: 57.2 m^{3}/s (2,020 cu ft/s)

The Jeti-Ögüz (Kyrgyz: Жети-Өгүз суусу / Жетөгүз суусу; Russian: Джеты-Огуз) is a river in Jeti-Ögüz District of Issyk-Kul Region of Kyrgyzstan. It rises on north slopes of Teskey Ala-Too Range and flows into lake Issyk-Kul. The length of the river is 52 km (32 mi) and the basin area 387 square kilometres (150 mi^{2}). Average annual discharge is 5.6 m^{3}/s (200 cu ft/s). The maximum flow is 57.2 m^{3}/s (2,020 cu ft/s) and the minimum - 0.55 m^{3}/s (19 cu ft/s). Jeti-Ögüz resort and Jeti-Ögüz village are located near the river. Several breakthrough-prone lakes including Telety, Archaly-Ter, Atjailoo and Asantukum located in the basin of the river at altitudes above 3500 m posing a risk of floods.
