= Ala-Köl =

Mountain lake in Kyrgyzstan

- Ала-Көл (Kyrgyz)
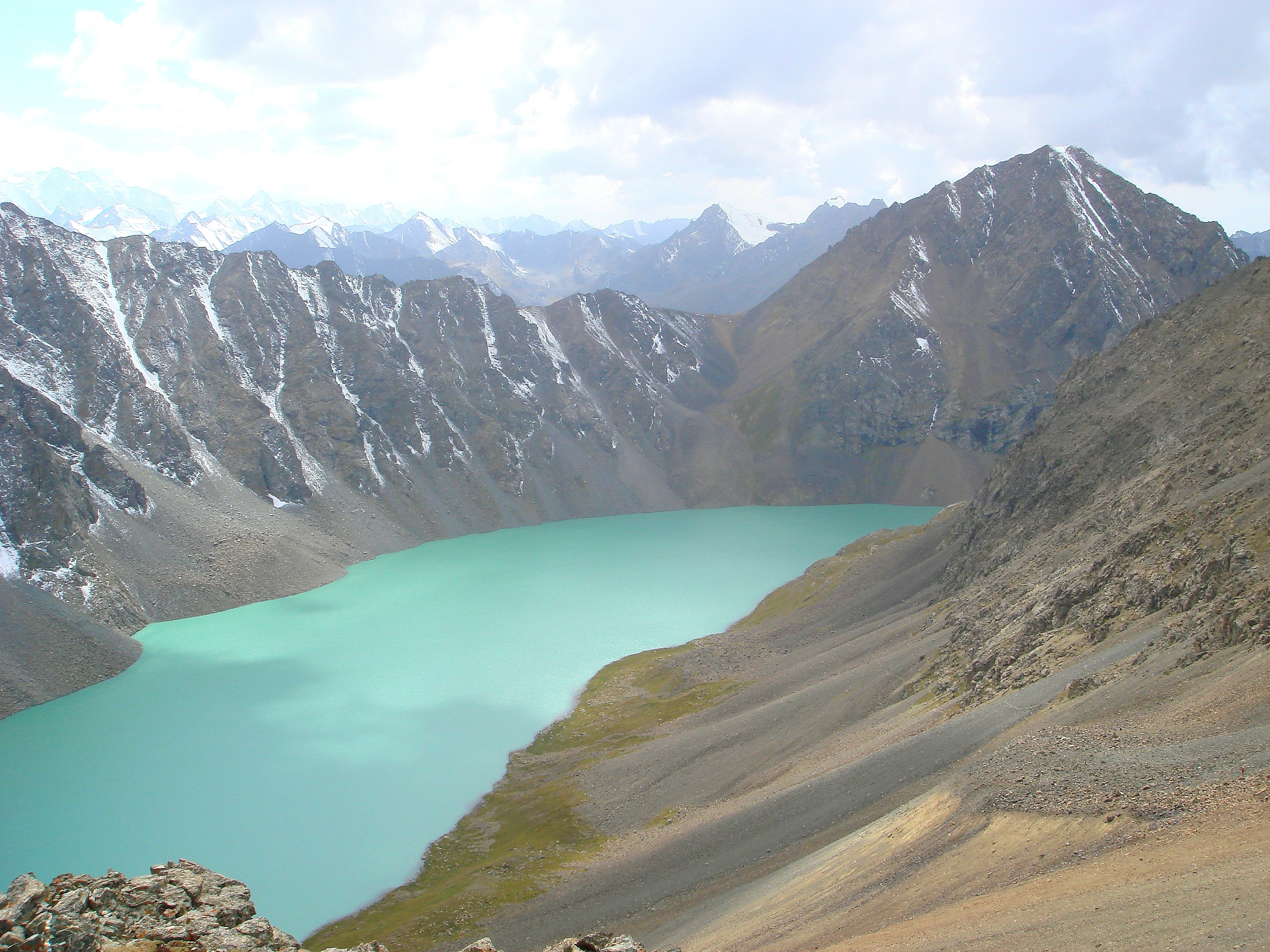

- Location within Kyrgyzstan Location within Asia
- Location: Terskey Alatau
- Coordinates: 42°19′3″N 78°32′8″E
- Lake type: Rock-dammed
- Catchment area: 9.46 km^{2} (3.65 sq mi)
- Basin countries: Kyrgyzstan
- Max. length: 2.8 km (1.7 mi)
- Max. width: 0.7 km (0.43 mi)
- Surface area: 1.5 km^{2} (0.58 sq mi)
- Surface elevation: 3,532 m (11,588 ft)

Ala-Köl (Kyrgyz: Ала-Көл, also Алакөл, Russian: Ала-Куль, romanized: Ala-Kul) is a rock-dammed lake on the northern slope of the Terskey Alatau mountain range in the Ak-Suu District of the Issyk-Kul Region in Kyrgyzstan. The lake is located in a narrow gorge on the right side of the Karakol Valley. The lake basin lies at an elevation of 3,532 m (11,588 ft) above sea level. A small stream flowing from a glacier feeds the lake. The lake is 2.8 km (1.7 mi) long and 600–700 m (2,000–2,300 ft) wide. Its area is 1.5 km^{2} (0.58 sq mi). It belongs to the type of dammed lakes. Water from the lake seeps out under the natural dam and flows into the Karakol River.

== History ==
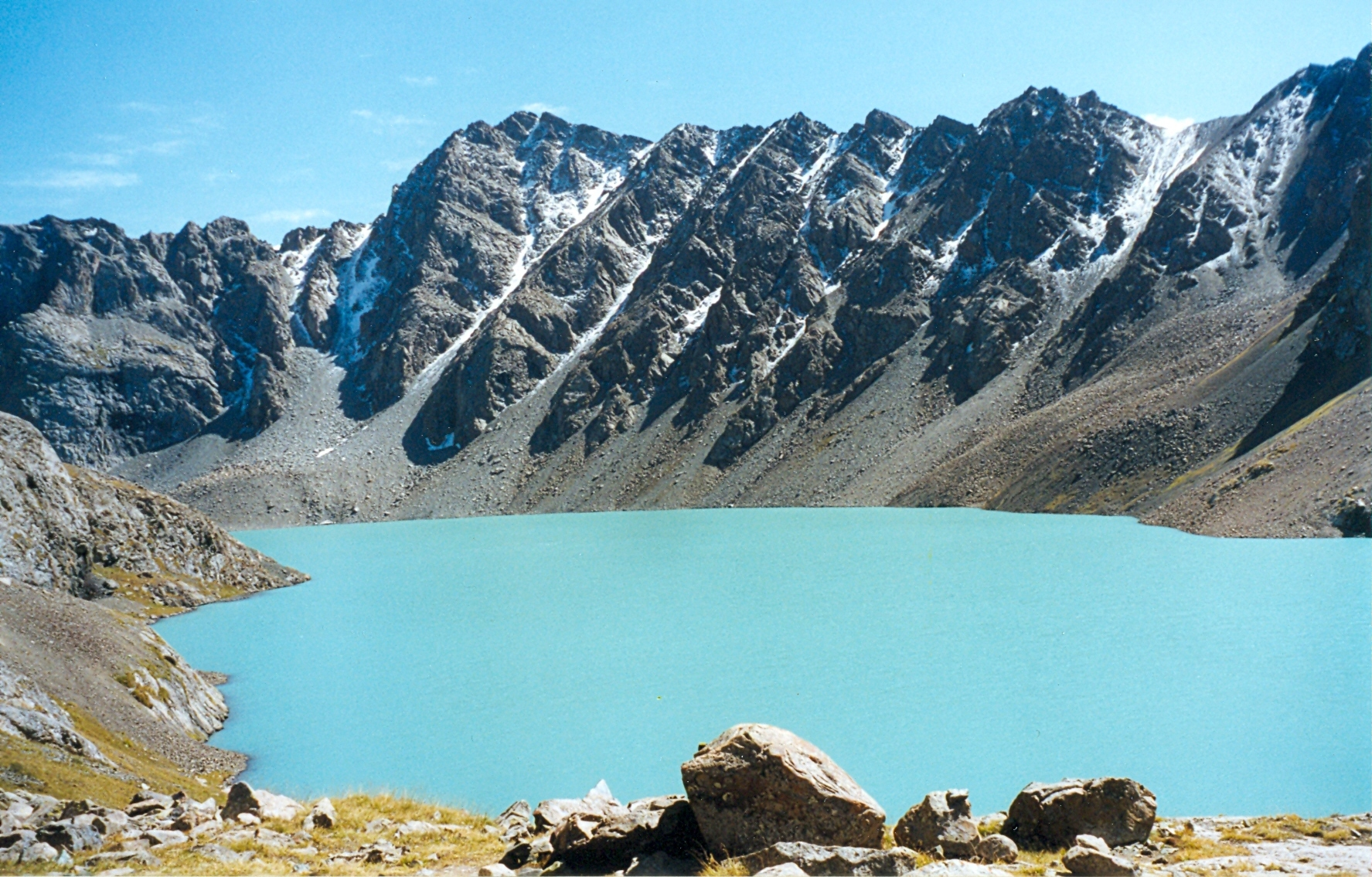
Lake Ala-Köl

A Russian traveller named Putimtsoff was the first to knowingly visit the lake in 1811. He gave a good description of it, mentioning rocks of different colours in the lake, and the furious winds blowing around the lake. Thirty years later Alexander von Schrenk explored the lake and its surroundings.

Literally, the name Ala-Köl would mean 'variegated lake,' although it probably takes its name from the Ala-Таu mountains lying further north.
