= Jyrgalang (river) =

- Native name: Жыргалаң (Kyrgyz)

Location
- Country: Kyrgyzstan
- Region: Issyk-Kul Region
- District: Ak-Suu District

Physical characteristics
- Mouth: Issyk-Kul
  - coordinates: 42°35′55″N 78°18′36″E
  - elevation: 1,600 m (5,200 ft)
- Length: 97 km (60 mi)
- Basin size: 2,070 km^{2} (800 sq mi)
- Discharge
  - average: 22.5 m^{3}/s (790 cu ft/s)
  - minimum: 7.12 m^{3}/s (251 cu ft/s)
  - maximum: 104 m^{3}/s (3,700 cu ft/s)

The Jyrgalang (Kyrgyz: Жыргалаң) is a river in Kyrgyzstan. It takes its rise on the north slopes of Teskey Ala-Too range and flows into Issyk-Kul lake. The villages Jyrgalang and Ak-Suu are located near the river. With its 97 km (60 mi), the river is second longest river of the Issyk-Kul basin. Average annual discharge is 22.5 m^{3}/s (790 cu ft/s). The maximum flow is 104 m^{3}/s (3,700 cu ft/s) and the minimum - 7.12 m^{3}/s (251 cu ft/s). The river's catchment area of 2,070 square kilometres (800 mi^{2}) is the largest among rivers feeding Issyk-Kul.
