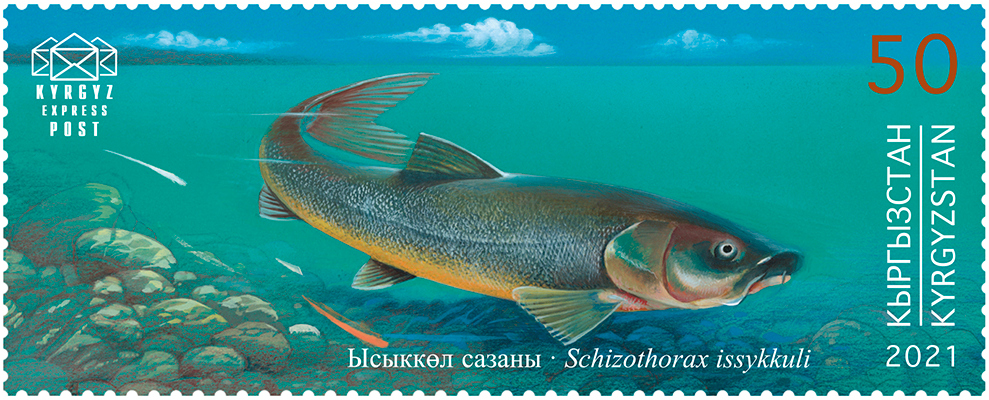
- Schizothorax pseudoaksaiensis issykkuli

Conservation status
- Vulnerable (IUCN 3.1)

Scientific classification
- Kingdom: Animalia
- Phylum: Chordata
- Class: Actinopterygii
- Order: Cypriniformes
- Family: Cyprinidae
- Subfamily: Schizothoracinae
- Genus: Schizothorax
- Species: S. pseudoaksaiensis

Binomial name
- Schizothorax pseudoaksaiensis Herzenstein, 1889

Synonyms
- Racoma pseudoaksaiensis (Herzenstein, 1889); Schizothorax kessleri Herzenstein, 1889

= Ili marinka =

Species of fish

The Ili marinka (Schizothorax pseudoaksaiensis) is a species of ray-finned fish in the genus Schizothorax from central Asia and western China.
