= Issyk-Kul =

Lake in northeastern Kyrgyzstan

- Temurtu-Nor
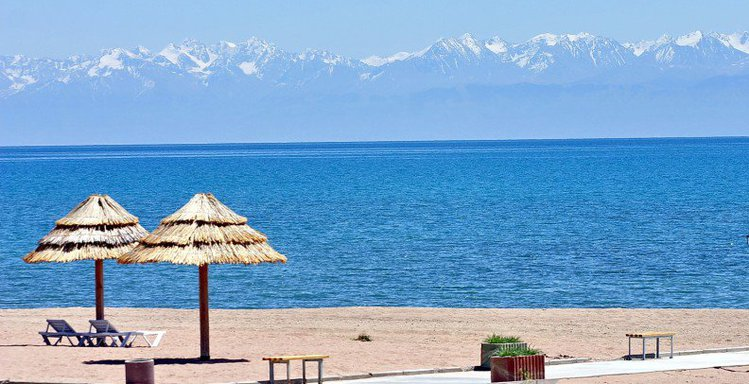
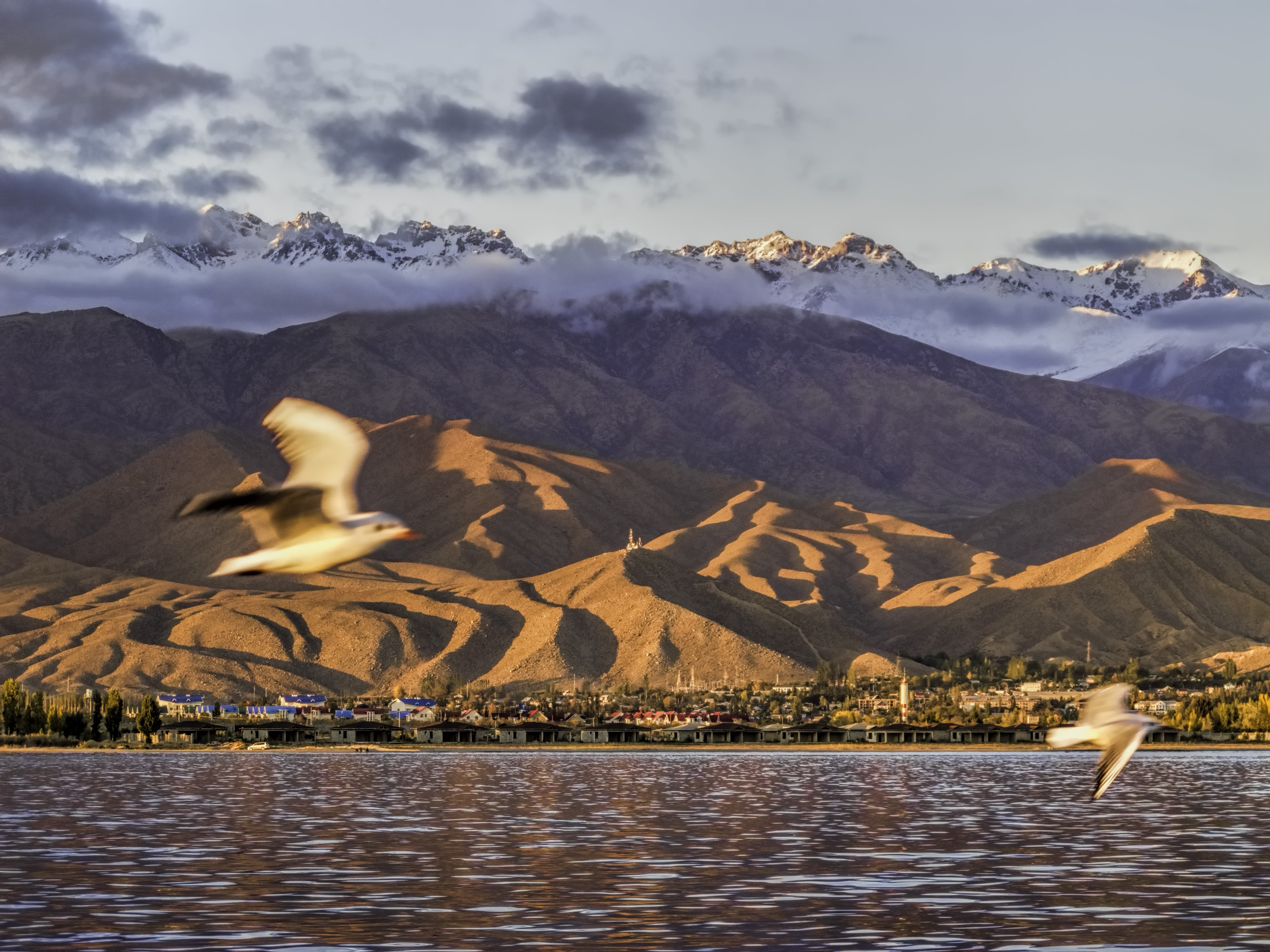
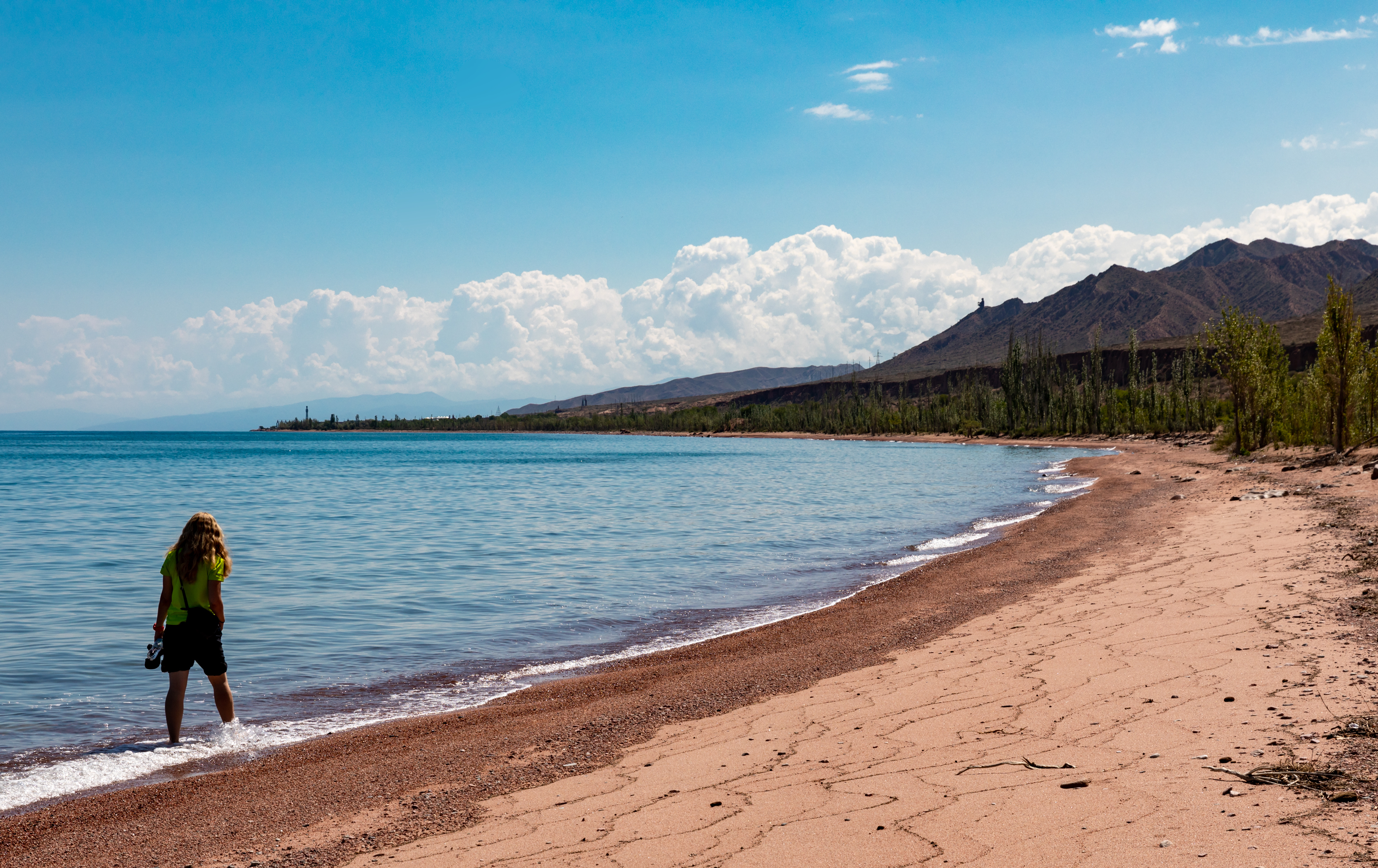

- Location within Kyrgyzstan Location within West and Central Asia

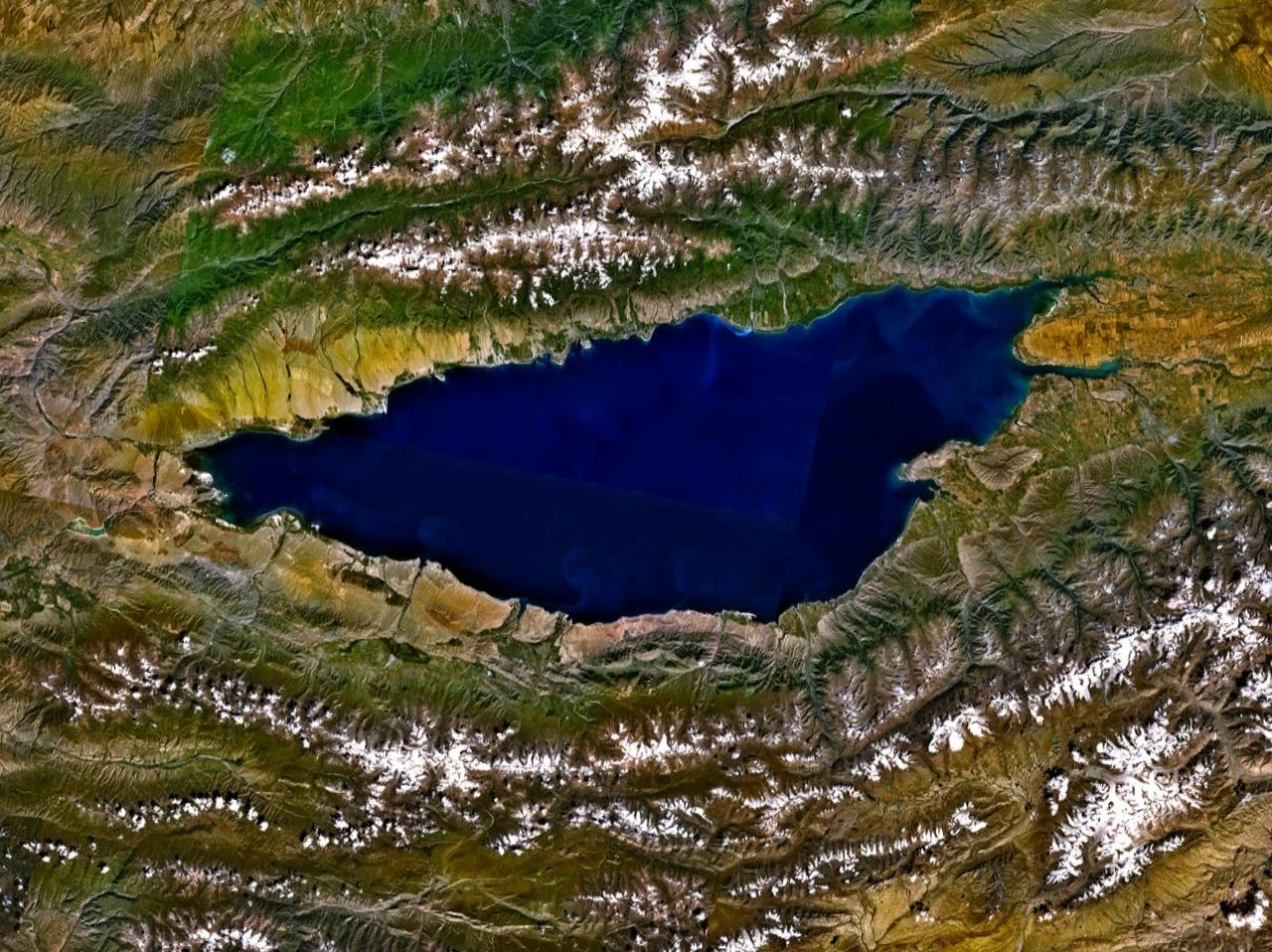
- Issyk-Kul from space, September 1992
- Coordinates: 42°25′N 77°15′E
- Lake type: Ancient lake, Endorheic; Mountain lake Monomictic, saline
- Primary inflows: Glaciers
- Primary outflows: Evaporation
- Catchment area: 15,844 square kilometres (6,117 sq mi)
- Basin countries: Kyrgyzstan
- Max. length: 178 kilometres (111 mi)
- Max. width: 60.1 kilometres (37.3 mi)
- Surface area: 6,236 square kilometres (2,408 sq mi)
- Average depth: 278.4 metres (913 ft)
- Max. depth: 668 metres (2,192 ft)
- Water volume: 1,736 cubic kilometres (416 mi^{3})
- Residence time: ~330 years
- Salinity: 6g/L
- Shore length^{1}: 669 kilometres (416 mi)
- Surface elevation: 1,607 metres (5,272 ft)
- Settlements: Balykchy, Cholpon-Ata, Karakol

Ramsar Wetland
- Official name: The Issyk-kul State Nature Reserve with the Issyk-kul Lake
- Designated: 12 November 2002
- Reference no.: 1231
- ^{1} Shore length is not a well-defined measure.

Issyk-Kul (Russian: Иссык-Куль) or Ysyk-Köl (Kyrgyz: Ысык-Көл [ɯsɯ́q kʰɵl]; lit. 'Hot Lake') is an endorheic saline lake in the western Tian Shan mountains in eastern Kyrgyzstan—just south of a dividing range separating Kyrgyzstan from Kazakhstan. It is the eighth-deepest lake in the world, the eleventh-largest lake in the world by volume, and the second-largest saline lake. It is located at an elevation of 1,607 metres (5,272 ft). Despite the elevation and low temperatures during winter, it rarely freezes due to its high salinity.

The lake is a Ramsar site of globally significant biodiversity and forms part of the Issyk-Kul Biosphere Reserve.

== Geography ==
Issyk-Kul Lake is 182 kilometres (113 mi) long, up to 60 kilometres (37 mi) wide and its surface area is 6,236 square kilometres (2,408 sq mi). It is the second-largest mountain lake in the world behind Lake Titicaca in South America. It is at an altitude of 1,607 metres (5,272 ft) and reaches 668 metres (2,192 ft) in depth.

About 118 rivers and streams flow into the lake; the largest are the Jyrgalang and Tüp. It is fed by springs, including many hot springs, and snow melt. The lake has no current outlet, but some hydrologists hypothesize that the lake's water filters deep underground into the Chu River. The bottom of the lake contains the mineral monohydrocalcite, one of the few known lacustrine deposits.

The lake's southern shore is dominated by the Teskey Ala-Too Range of the Tian Shan mountains. The northern slopes of the range are long and send a considerable flow to Issyk-Kul. Numerous streams taking their rise at the slopes flow together into comparatively large rivers. They deeply dissect the range and flow in wide valleys. On exit from mountains the rivers form large alluvial cones. In the eastern part of Issyk-Kul they flow into the Jyrgalang river. The Kungey Alatau of the Tian Shan runs parallel to the north shore. The southern slopes of the Kungey Alatau are comparatively short and the rivers rising on them are relatively small and do not have a chance to flow together to form larger hydrographic systems. As a result, they separately empty either into Issyk-Kul or into the Tüp river flowing along the range.

The lake water's salinity is approx. 0.6% – compared to 3.5% salinity of typical seawater – and, although the lake level is still currently some 8 metres (26 ft) higher than in medieval times, its level now drops by approximately 5 centimetres (2.0 in) per year due to water diversion.

Administratively, the lake and the adjacent land are within the Issyk-Kul Region of Kyrgyzstan.

== Tourism ==
During the Soviet era, the lake became a popular vacation resort, with numerous sanitoria, boarding houses and vacation homes along its northern shore, many concentrated in and around the town of Cholpon-Ata. These fell on hard times after the break-up of the USSR, but now hotel complexes are being refurbished and simple private bed-and-breakfast rentals are being established for a new generation of health and leisure visitors.

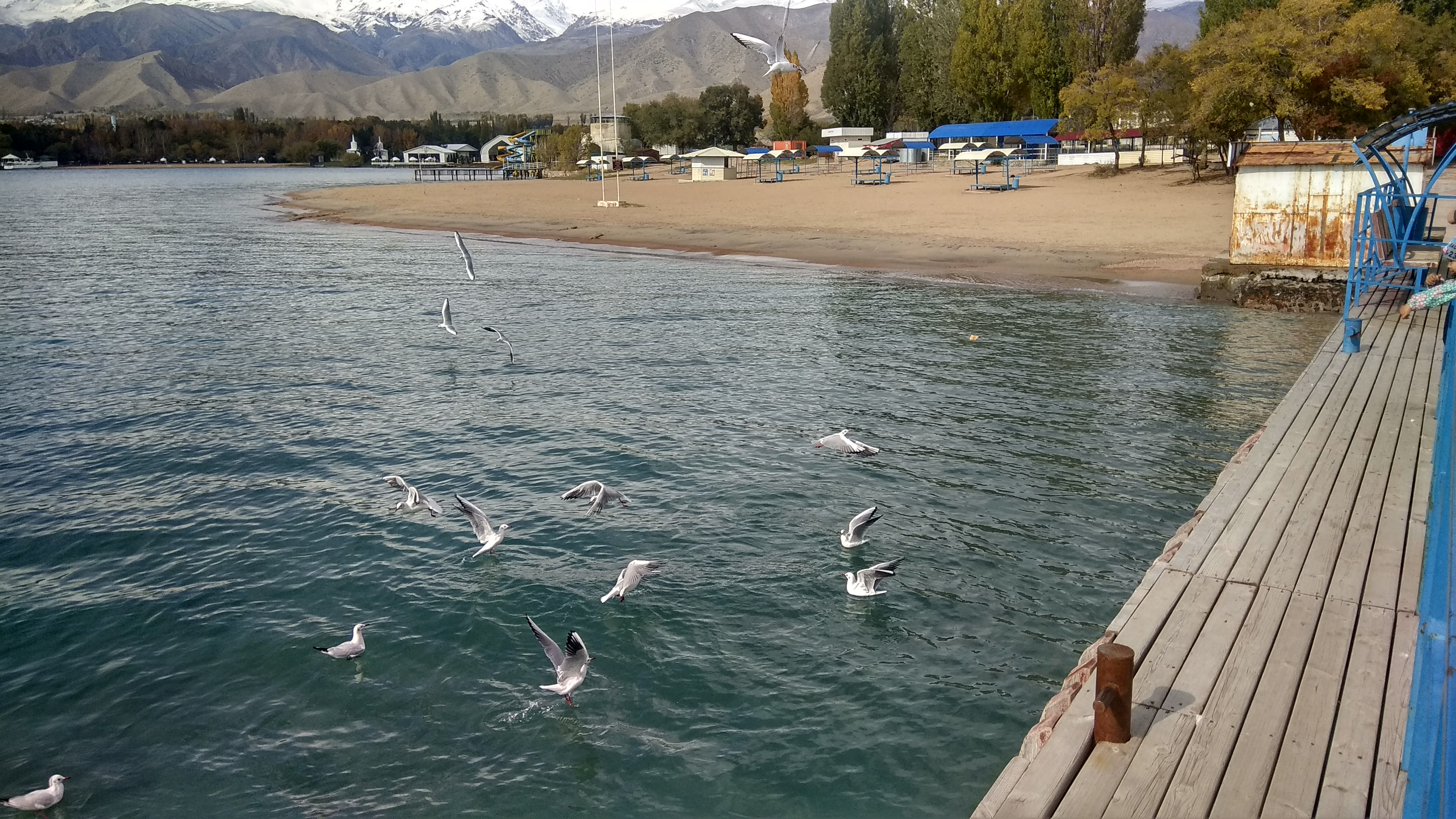
Issyk kul Lake

The city of Karakol (formerly Przhevalsk, after the Russian explorer Przhevalsky, who died there) is the administrative seat of the Issyk-Kul Region of Kyrgyzstan. It is near the east tip of the lake and is a base for excursions into the surrounding area. Its small old core contains a wooden mosque, built without metal nails by the Dungan people, and a wooden Orthodox church that was used as a stable during Soviet times.

== History ==
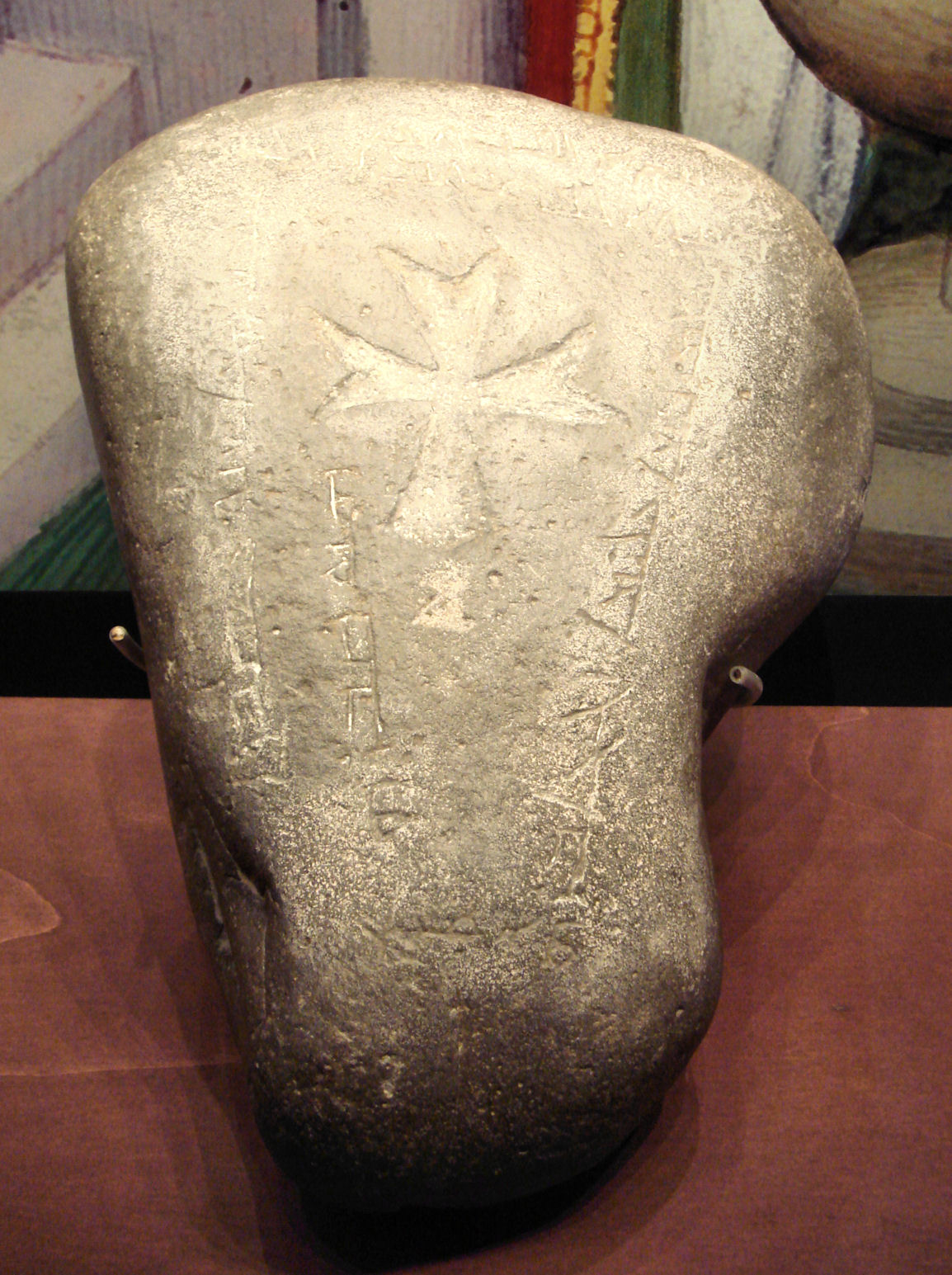
Nestorian tombstone with inscriptions in Old Uyghur, found in Issyk-Kul, dated 1312

Issyk-Kul was a stopover on the Silk Road, a land route for travelers from the Far East to Europe. The great Chinese Buddhist scholar-monk Xuanzang passed by this lake and noted it in the classic travelogue Great Tang Records on the Western Regions in the 7th century. The lake was once a part of the territory of the Qing dynasty of China and was ceded to Russia—along with the surrounding territory—after the Treaty of Tarbagatai. In Manchu/Mongol records, the lake was known as Temurtu-Nor, or "Iron Lake".

Many historians believe that the lake was the point of origin for the Black Death that plagued Europe and Asia during the early and mid-14th century. In 2022, researchers reported on the analysis of preserved genetic material from seven individuals buried in two cemeteries near Issyk-Kul and determined that the Black Death was present there in 1338 or 1339. The plague first infected people in a nearby settlement of traders eight years before it devastated Eurasia, killing 60 percent of the population, having traveled along trade routes. The lake's status as a byway for travelers allowed the plague to spread across these continents via medieval merchants who unknowingly carried infested vermin along with them.

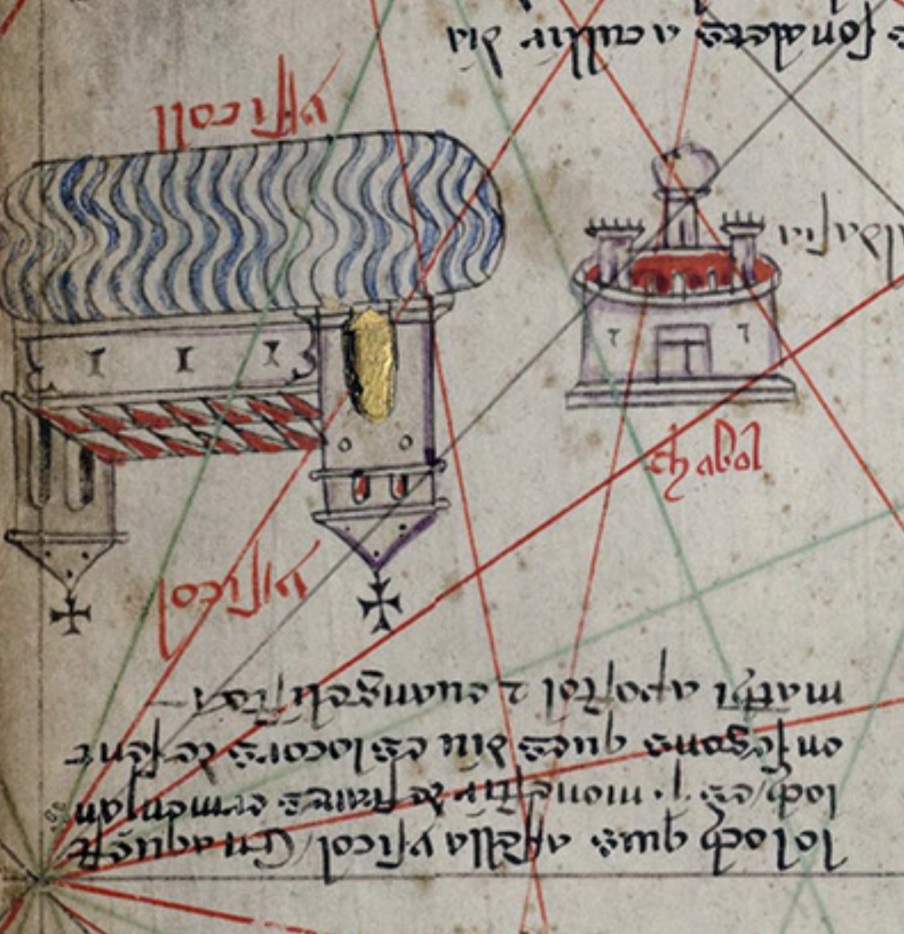
Cropped image of the 1375 Catalan Atlas depicting the lake (North on the top). The inscription says: "The place is named Ysicol. In this place is a monastery of Armenian brothers, which say, in here is Matthew the apostle and evangelist"

The lake level is some 8 metres (26 ft) higher than in medieval times. Divers have found the remains of submerged settlements in shallow areas around the lake.

Maksim Menshikov notes that Toru-Aygyr, a settlement near the northwest shore of the lake, was founded in the 13th century. Earthquakes in the 15th century submerged the settlement in to the lake. A Muslim cemetery existed in the settlement and was around 14 acres in size.

Articles identified as the world's oldest extant coins were found underwater, with gold wire rings used as small change and a large hexahedral gold piece. Also found was a bronze cauldron with a level of craftsmanship that is today achieved by using an inert gas environment.

In 1916 the monastery at Issyk-Kul was attacked by Kyrgyz rebels, and seven monks were killed.

== Environment ==
=== Specially protected areas ===
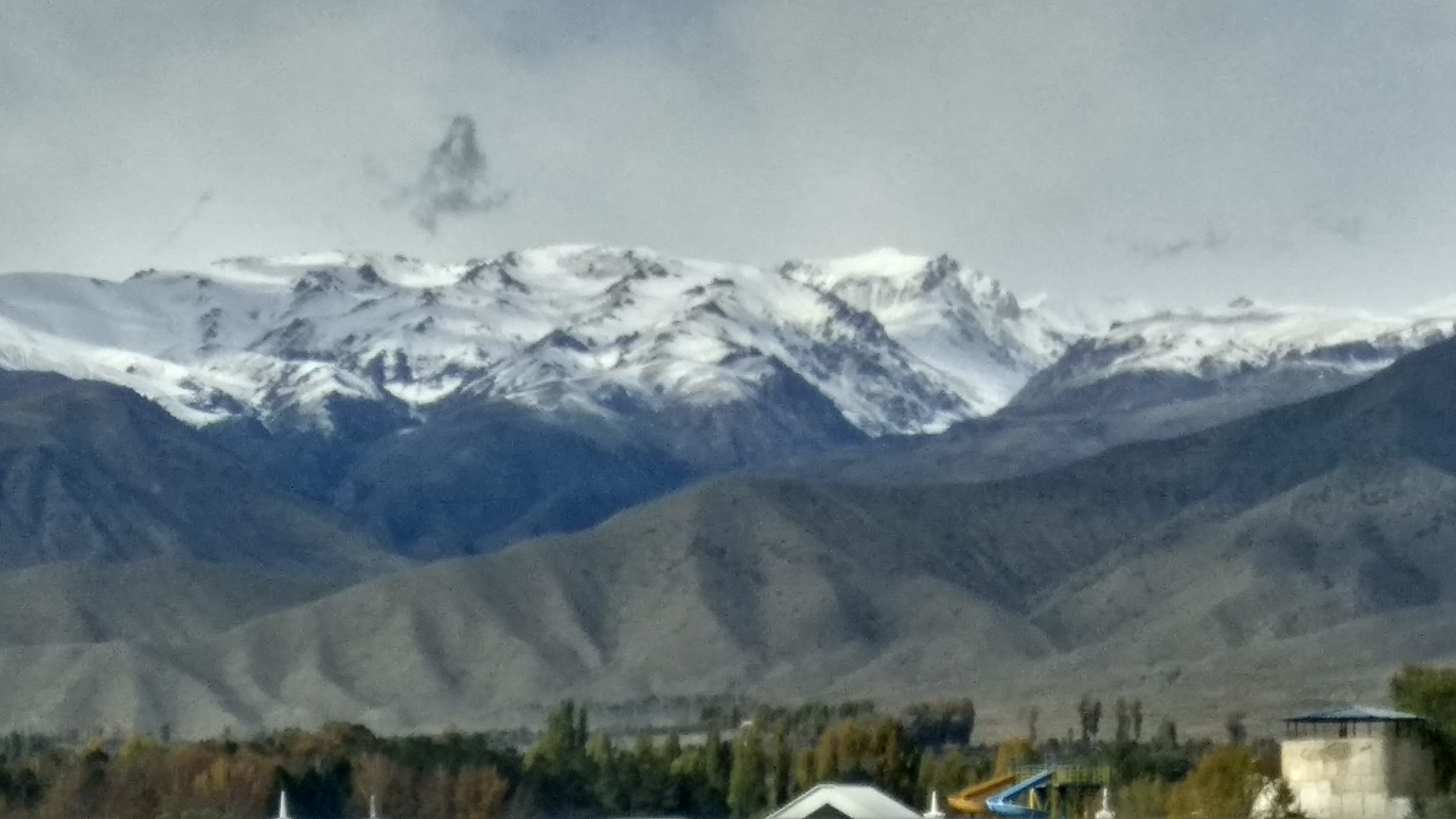
Mountains near Issyk-Kul

The first nature reserve in Kyrgyzstan, Issyk-Kul State Reserve was established in 1948 to protect unique nature landscapes and waterfowl at Issyk-Kul. In 1975, it was acknowledged as a Ramsar site. Biosphere Reserve Issyk-Kul covered by UNESCO World Network of Biosphere Reserves was established in year 2000 within the administrative borders of Issyk-Kul Region.

=== Fish ===
The lake contains highly endemic fish biodiversity, and some of the species, including four endemics, are seriously endangered. In recent years yields of all fish species have declined markedly, due to a combination of overfishing, heavy predation by two of the introduced invasive species (the pike perch and the rainbow trout), and the cessation of lake restocking with juvenile fish from hatcheries. At least four commercially targeted endemic fish species are sufficiently threatened to be included in the Red Book of the Kyrgyz Republic — Schmidt's dace (Leuciscus schmidti), Issyk-Kul dace (Leuciscus bergi), Ili marinka (Schizothorax pseudoaksaiensis issykkulensis), and sheer or naked osman (Gymnodiptychus dybowskii). Five other indigenous species — Issyk-kul minnow (Phoxinus issykkulensis), Issykul gudgeon (Gobio gobio latus), spotted thicklip loach (Triplophysa strauchii ulachilicus), grey stone loach (Triplophysa dorsalis), asp (Leuciscus aspius iblioides) — are almost certainly threatened as bycatch or are indirectly impacted by fishing activity and changes to the ecological structure and balance of the lake's fish population.

Sevan trout, a fish endemic to Lake Sevan in Armenia, was introduced into Issyk-Kul in the 1970s. While this fish is an endangered species in its native waters, it has a much better chance to survive in Lake Issyk-Kul where it has actively predated on other species, but is limited in habitat for reproduction and in food.

=== Birds ===
The lake supports large numbers of wintering waterfowl as well as waders and passerines on passage migration. Both the western and eastern ends of the lake have been recognised as Important Bird Areas (IBAs) by BirdLife International.

=== Dead Lake ===
There is a small lake below the water level of Issyk Kul at the south-west side of the lake. This lake is called Tyz köl (salt lake) in Kyrgyz due to its very high saline content and swimming in the Issyk Kul salt lake is a very different experience from less salty water. The lake receives its water from small cold springs at the beach which lead the cold, less heavy water to the top of the lake and often the salty, heavy water below is oddly more warm than the water on the surface.

== Russian Navy test site ==
During the Soviet period, the Soviet Navy operated an extensive facility at the lake's east end, where submarine and torpedo technology was evaluated. In March 2008, Kyrgyz newspapers reported that 866 hectares (2,140 acres) around the Karabulan Peninsula on the lake would be leased for an indefinite period to the Russian Navy, which is planning to establish new naval testing facilities as part of the 2007 bilateral Agreement on Friendship, Cooperation, Mutual Help, and Protection of Secret Materials. The Russian military will pay $4.5 million annually to lease the area. India, in 2011, announced plans to invest in the facility to test various types of torpedoes. India is also planning to use the torpedo test facility to test the autonomous underwater vehicle being developed by NSTL. For this, India has proposed to engage local companies with know-how in torpedo technology to further co-develop the facility.

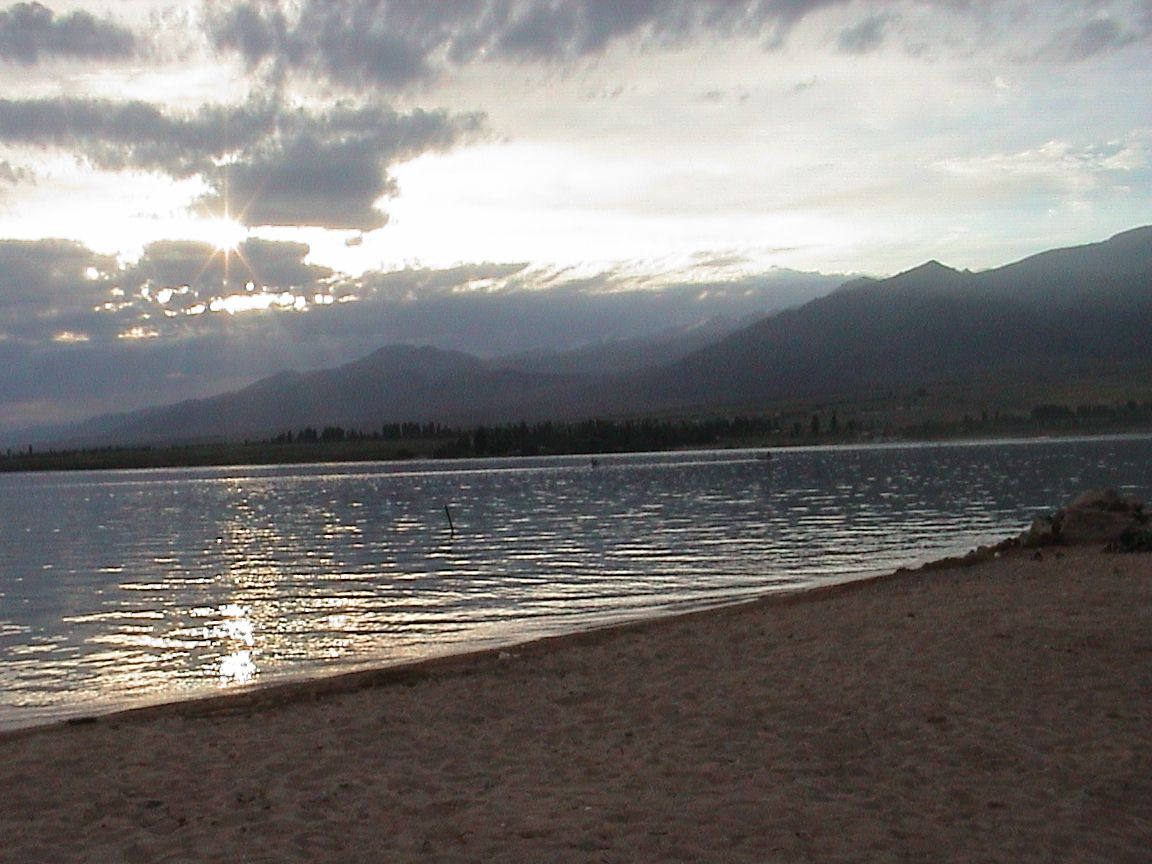
Issyk-Kul at sundown (August 2002)

== Lakeside towns ==
Towns and some villages around the lake, listed clockwise from the lake's western tip:

- Balykchy (the railhead at the western end of the lake)
- Kosh-Köl
- Tamchy
- Cholpon-Ata (the capital of the north shore)
- Tüp
- Karakol (the regional capital near the eastern end of the lake, formerly named Przhevalsk)
- Barskoon

== Notable inhabitants ==
- Tugolbay Sydykbekov, writer

== See also ==
- Lake Ala-Kul
