= Terskey Alatoo =

Mountain range in Kyrgyzstan

Teskey Alatoo
- Terskey Alatau
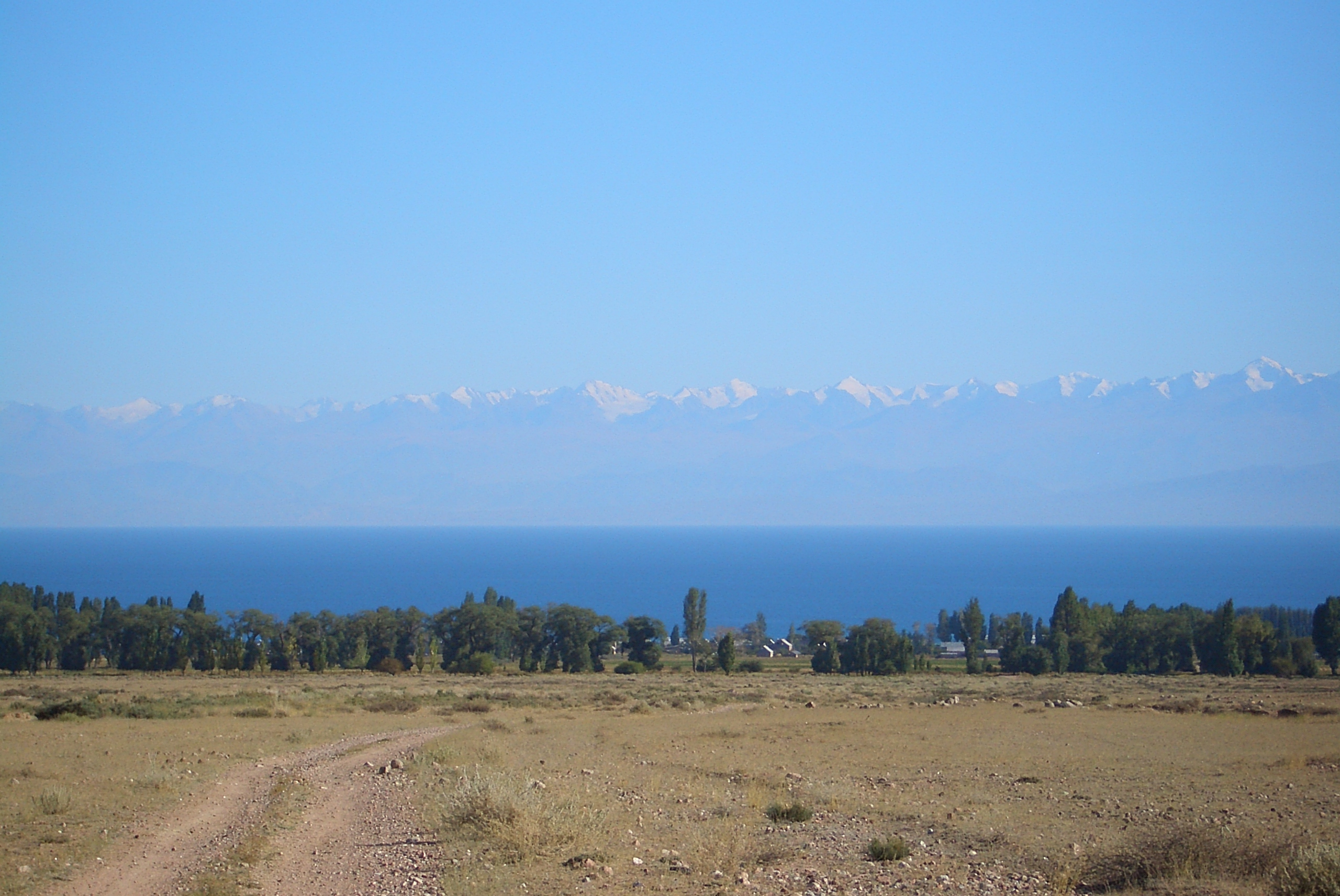
- Teskey Alatoo seen from across Issyk-Kul

Highest point
- Peak: Karakol Peak
- Elevation: 5,216 m (17,113 ft)
- Coordinates: 42°10′N 78°28′E

Dimensions
- Length: 354 km (220 mi) E–W
- Width: 40 km (25 mi) N–S

Naming
- Native name: Kyrgyz: Тескей Алатоо

Geography
- Location within Kyrgyzstan
- Country: Kyrgyzstan
- Region: Issyk-Kul Region
- Parent range: Tian Shan

The Teskey Alatoo or Teskei Ala-Too (Kyrgyz: Тескей Алатоо, IPA: [tʰeskʰéj ɑɫɑtʰóː]), also known as Terskey Alatau (Russian: Терскей-Алатау), is a mountain range in the Tian Shan of Kyrgyzstan, bordering the southern side of Lake Issyk-Kul. It extends for 354 km from Semyonov Peak in the east to the Joon-Aryk River near Kochkor in the west, reaching a maximum width of 40 km. Its highest point is Karakol Peak, at 5,216 m.

== Geography ==
The range extends approximately east–west, forming an arc that curves southwards. Its western section is known as Ükök, while the eastern section between Ashuu-Tör Pass and Semyonov Peak is called Ashuu-Tör. It is bordered by the Issyk-Kul and Kochkor valleys to the north, and by the Karakujur (2,500–3,200 m), Üch-Emchek (3,000–3,600 m), Arabel (3,400–3,800 m), and Sary-Jaz (3,000–3,600 m) valleys to the south. The range is 354 km long and up to 40 km wide, with an average elevation of 4,470 m. Its highest summit, Karakol Peak, reaches 5,216 m.

In its central section, the range comprises two orographically distinct branches, Eastern Teskey and Western Teskey. Its western half consists of two parallel mountain chains separated by a series of intermontane valleys and depressions.

The southern slope extends for approximately 13–15 km, while the northern slope is longer, at 24–30 km. The southern slope is deeply dissected by the valleys of right-bank tributaries of the Joon-Aryk, Kichi Naryn, and Sary-Jaz rivers. Rivers on the northern slope drain into Issyk-Kul. Their upper valleys are glacial troughs ending in steep-sided cirques, many of which contain glaciers.

Mountain passes connect the Issyk-Kul basin with the Karakaman, Karasaz, Üch-Emchek, Balgart, and Sary-Jaz valleys. These include Tong (4,024 m), Tosor (3,830 m), Barskoon (3,756 m), Juuku (3,633 m), Chong-Ashuu (3,806 m), and Juukuchak (4,070 m).

== Geology and relief ==
The Teskey Alatoo consists mainly of metamorphosed schists, limestone, sandstone, and clay shale of Precambrian and Late Cambrian–Early Ordovician age. Intrusive rocks include red and grey granites, syenite-diorites, and granodiorites. Quartzites and red and grey conglomerates also occur.

Paleozoic rocks form much of the range, while Tertiary rocks occur in the foothills. Caledonian granites are exposed in lateral spurs between the Ak-Terek and Tong gorges, and Proterozoic rocks predominate in the Tuura-Suu basin.

During the Neogene and Quaternary, movement along the North Teskey and Central Teskey faults formed the Teskey mega-anticline. The floor of the Issyk-Kul basin, filled with Cenozoic sediments, subsided by approximately 4.5 km, while the ridges and peaks of the range rose by as much as 5 km. The combined amplitude of uplift and subsidence thus approached 10 km.

The Central Teskey Fault divides the range into the asymmetrical Eastern Teskey and Western Teskey megastructures. Movement along the North Teskey Fault produced several parallel horst-anticline structures, including Uzunkyr, Kyzyl-Küngöy, Tastarata, Kyzyl-Choku, Karakoojunay, Kara-Küngöy, and Tegerek. These are separated by graben-syncline structures, including Orto-Tokoy, Kongur-Ölöng–Alabash, Ulakol, and Semizbel.

Remnants of ancient plains formed before the uplift of the mountains survive across the range. Some of these surfaces on slopes facing the Arabel Valley are occupied by glaciers. Glacial landforms are widespread in the upper mountains and include trough valleys, cirques, and ancient moraines.

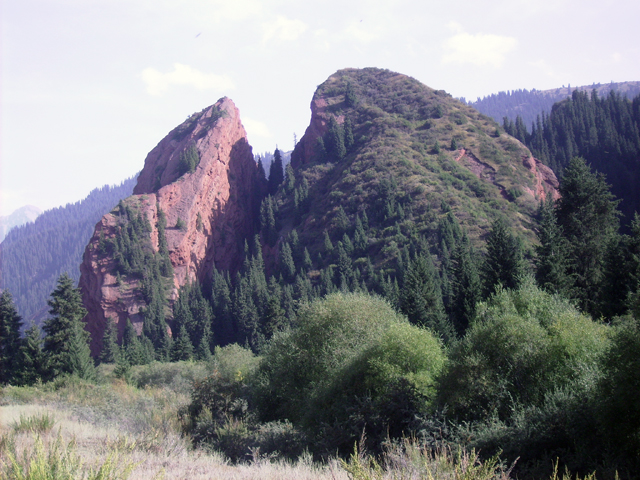
Broken Heart Rock in the Jeti-Ögüz Valley

== Glaciation ==
The Teskey Alatoo is a major centre of glaciation in the Inner Tian Shan. The highest section lies east of Barskoon Pass, extending towards the headwaters of the Türgön Ak-Suu River. Glaciers and firn fields are concentrated along its crest. The western half is less extensively glaciated and contains numerous saddles and mountain passes.

Published figures record 1,395 glaciers covering a total area of 1,080 km², including 700 glaciers covering 509.4 km² on the northern slope. Glacier termini are reported at elevations of 3,000–3,500 m on the northern slope and 3,700–3,900 m on the southern slope. Major glaciers include the Kolpakovsky, Tyurgon, and Aylanysh glaciers.

The range experienced several phases of Quaternary glaciation. Early Quaternary ice on the side facing Issyk-Kul covered approximately 2,588 km². During a subsequent glaciation, the ice-covered area reached 2,532 km². A later phase covered approximately 1,307 km², with individual glaciers no longer than 15 km.

== Climate and vegetation ==
The climate is temperate continental, with more continental conditions in the high mountains. Temperatures decrease and precipitation generally increases with elevation. Annual precipitation ranges from 300–400 mm in the foothills to 700–800 mm in the glaciated belt. Differences in temperature and precipitation between the northern and southern slopes influence the distribution of vegetation.

Trees are sparse on the southern slope. Fescue, kobresia, and feather grass occur at elevations of 2,400–2,900 m. Subalpine and alpine vegetation at 2,800–3,800 m includes fescue, wormwood, kobresia, and sedges. Above approximately 3,700–3,800 m, the glacial–nival belt consists of glaciers, moraines, rock, and scree, with scattered cushion plants, thyme, mosses, and lichens.

On the northern slope, hilly steppe occupies elevations of 1,800–2,000 m, supporting wormwood, feather grass, fescue, and shrubs on sandy, dark chestnut soils. Forest-steppe and forest occur at 2,000–2,900 m, with spruce, spiraea, juniper, and shrubby meadows. These give way to subalpine meadows at 2,900–3,100 m and alpine meadow-steppe at 3,100–3,800 m. Perennial snow and glaciers occupy the highest elevations.

Semi-desert and dry steppe landscapes occur in the western foothills and intermontane depressions. Spruce forests occupy parts of the middle and upper mountain belts, giving way at higher elevations to mountain meadows and alpine tundra.

== Land use and recreation ==
The mountain pastures are used for grazing, while the forests serve as recreational areas. Resorts and sanatoriums have developed around thermal springs at Jeti-Ögüz, Ak-Suu, Altyn-Arashan, and Jyrgalang. Tamga is another resort at the foot of the range.
