= Şirvanlı =

Şirvanlı or Shirvanly may refer to:

- Şirvanlı, Agdam, Azerbaijan
- Şirvanlı, Barda, Azerbaijan
- Şirvanlı, Neftchala, Azerbaijan
- Şirvanlı, Oghuz, Azerbaijan
