= Mikayıllı =

Mikayıllı or Mikailly or Mikeyly may refer to:

- Mikayıllı, Jalilabad, Azerbaijan
- Mikayıllı, Neftchala, Azerbaijan
