= Samadagha Shikhlarov =

Azerbaijani footballer (1955–2021)

Personal information
- Full name: Səmədağa Məhəmməd oğlu Şıxlarov
- Date of birth: 5 September 1955
- Place of birth: Xıllı, Neftchala District, Azerbaijani SSR, Soviet Union
- Date of death: 1 June 2021 (aged 65)
- Place of death: Baku, Azerbaijan
- Height: 1.69 m (5 ft 7 in)
- Position: Forward

Senior career*
Years	Team	Apps	(Gls)
1974	Neftchi Baku	9	(0)
1975	Khazar Sumgayit	20	(8)
1977	Avtomobilist Baku	62	(34)
1977–1980	Neftchi Baku	66	(6)
1980–1982	SKA Kyiv	37	(12)
1982–1984	Neftchi Baku	60	(15)
1985–1988	FK Ganca	42	(24)
1992	Chiraqqala Siyazan	11	(3)
Total		307	(102)

International career
1982	USSR (Olympic)	2	(1)
- * Club domestic league appearances and goals

Samadagha Shikhlarov (Azerbaijani: Səmədağa Məhəmməd oğlu Şıxlarov; 5 September 1955 – 1 June 2021) was an Azerbaijani professional footballer who played as forward for Neftchi Baku PFC, Khazar, SKA Kiev, Chiraqqala Siyazan.

Shikhlarov was well known for his heading ability, remembered for his two goals against Spartak Moscow in 1982. He played for the Neftchi Baku up to 152 times, by scoring 21 goals in Soviet Top League and twice for the Soviet Union Olympic national football team.

He was appointed Neftchi's scout in March 2009. He moved to Olimpik-Shuvalan PFC Baku after Nazim Suleymanov's arrival at the club.

Shikhlarov died in a car crash on Hasan Aliyev Street in Baku on 1 June 2021.
