= Xanməmmədli =

Xanməmmədli or Khanmamedli may refer to:

- Xanməmmədli, Neftchala, Azerbaijan
- Xanməmmədli, Zardab, Azerbaijan
