= Sarykamysh =

Sarykamysh and variants, literally meaning "yellow reeds" in Turkic languages, may refer to:

- Sarıkamış, Turkey
- Sarıkamış, Elâzığ, Turkey
- Sarıqamış, Neftchala, Azerbaijan
- Sarıqamış, Samukh, Azerbaijan
- Sarygamysh Lake, in Turkmenistan
- Sary-Kamysh, Batken, village in Kadamjay District, Batken Region, Kyrgyzstan
- Sary-Kamysh, Ak-Suu, village in Ak-Suu District, Issyk-Kul Region, Kyrgyzstan
- Sary-Kamysh, Issyk-Kul, village in Issyk-Kul District, Issyk-Kul Region, Kyrgyzstan
- Sary-Kamysh, Jalal-Abad, village in Nooken District, Jalal-Abad Region, Kyrgyzstan
- Sary-Kamysh, Osh, village in Kara-Kulja District, Osh Region, Kyrgyzstan

Sary-Kamysh, village in Issyk-Kul Region of Kyrgyzstan
