= Kürdili =

- Location within Azerbaijan
- Coordinates: 38°59′21″N 49°08′14″E
- Country: Azerbaijan
- Rayon: Neftchala
- Municipality: Mikayıllı

Population (2017)
  - Total: 1
- Time zone: UTC+4 (AZT)
  - Summer (DST): UTC+5 (AZT)

Kürdili (also, Kür Dili, Kurinskaya Kesa, Kurinskaya Kosa, and Kurkosa) is a village in the Neftchala Rayon of Azerbaijan. The village forms part of the municipality of Mikayıllı. The settlement was founded by a group of people of Russian origin at the beginning of the twentieth century when it was still located on a peninsula. In 1976, it became part of the Gizil-Agach State Reserve. In 1981, as a result of an increase in the level of the Caspian Sea, the villages of Kurkosa and Jarski ended up on an island. The government evacuated the population of Kurkosa and resettled it on the mainland, though some residents chose to stay. The last residents abandoned the village in 2013, except for one person who continued to live there as of 2017. The area of the village still forms part of the Gizil-Agach Reserve, and outsiders require a special permit to access it.
