= Saratovka =

Saratovka may refer to:

- Saratovka, Armenia
- Saratovka, Azerbaijan
- Saratovka, Kazakhstan
