= Abasallı =

- Location within Azerbaijan
- Coordinates: 39°26′N 49°05′E
- Country: Azerbaijan
- Rayon: Neftchala
- Municipality: Tatarməhlə
- Time zone: UTC+4 (AZT)
  - Summer (DST): UTC+5 (AZT)

Abasallı (also, Abbasally and Abas-Ali) is a village in the Neftchala Rayon of Azerbaijan. The village forms part of the municipality of Tatarməhlə.
