= Qırmızıkənd =

- Municipality
- Location within Azerbaijan
- Coordinates: 39°20′20″N 48°45′57″E
- Country: Azerbaijan
- Rayon: Neftchala

Population
  - Total: 2,329
- Time zone: UTC+4 (AZT)
  - Summer (DST): UTC+5 (AZT)

Qırmızıkənd (also, Kyrmyzykend) is a village and municipality in the Neftchala Rayon of Azerbaijan. It has a population of 2,329.
