= Asylgul Abdurekhmenova =

Kyrgyzstani politician

Asylgul Abdurekhmenova (Kyrgyz: Асылгүл Абдурахманова; romanised: Asylgül Abdurakhmanova) (born 1953) is a politician from Kyrgyzstan.

Abdurekhmanova was born in Bosteri, a village in Issyk-Kul Region. She graduated from the Przevalsk Pedagogical Institute in 1974, and became a secondary school teacher in the village of Chon Urukty, where she remained until 1978. That year she took a job at the Komsomol, which marked the beginning of her political career. From 1979 until 1987 she held a variety of positions in the district branch Communist Party of Kirghizia, later moving to the Kara Suu and Jany-Jol districts of Osh Region. From 1987 until 1996 she held a variety of administrative posts in the municipal administrations of Osh and Karakol; she also served as mayor of Karakol for a time. In 1996 she was named Minister of Labor and Social Protection, in which position she remained until 1998, when she was replaced by Imankadyr Rysaliev. Issues which she faced during her time in office included the influx of refugees into Kyrgyzstan from Tajikistan during the civil war there and a spat with Russia over footage of a Kyrgyz children's home which was shown on Russian television.
