= Mirzəqurbanlı =

Place in Neftchala, Azerbaijan

- Location within Azerbaijan
- Country: Azerbaijan
- Rayon: Neftchala
- Time zone: UTC+4 (AZT)
  - Summer (DST): UTC+5 (AZT)

Mirzəqurbanlı is a village and municipality in the Neftchala Rayon of Azerbaijan. It has a population of 535. The municipality consists of the villages of Mirzəqurbanlı and Uzunbabalı.
