= Qaçaqkənd =

- Municipality
- Location within Azerbaijan
- Coordinates: 39°23′34″N 48°46′46″E
- Country: Azerbaijan
- Rayon: Neftchala

Population
  - Total: 2,110
- Time zone: UTC+4 (AZT)
  - Summer (DST): UTC+5 (AZT)

Qaçaqkənd (also, Kachag-Kend and Kachakkend) is a village and municipality in the Neftchala Rayon of Azerbaijan. It has a population of 2,110. The municipality consists of the villages of Qaçaqkənd, Qazaxbərəsi, Ramazanlı, and Xanməmmədli.
