= Bëyuk-Oriyat =

- Location within Azerbaijan
- Coordinates: 39°23′38″N 49°13′46″E
- Country: Azerbaijan
- Rayon: Neftchala
- Time zone: UTC+4 (AZT)
  - Summer (DST): UTC+5 (AZT)

Bëyuk-Oriyat (also, Beyuk-Or’yat, Bol’shoy Oriat, and Oriyat) is a village in the Neftchala Rayon of Azerbaijan.
