= Central Eurasian Studies Society =

North American-based society

The Central Eurasian Studies Society (CESS) is a North American-based society for scholars concerned with the Central Eurasian region. The society seeks to "facilitate communication and interaction among scholars of the Central Eurasia region, and in doing so to promote high standards of scholarship and instruction about the Central Eurasia region; to promote cooperation among persons and organizations concerned with the scholarly study of Central Eurasia; and to promote general knowledge of and public interest in Central Eurasia". Created in 2000, the society holds annual conferences and presents awards for recent publications.

== History ==
Initial discussion about the creation of a society for Central Asian studies in North America began in the late 1990s during workshops at the University of Wisconsin–Madison. Eventually consensus was reached for the establishment of the Central Eurasian Studies Society, and the first annual conference was held in October 2000. In April 2001, CESS was incorporated as a non-profit corporation in Massachusetts. The organization grew rapidly, and by 2003 had over 1,500 members from 70 countries.

The Central Eurasian Studies Review, was the society's main publication, first published in 2002, but is no longer published. However, links to previous copies are archived on their website .

By 2003, the CESS Secretariat had been established at Harvard University's Program on Central Asia and the Caucasus. The secretariat would later become a rotating secretariat, moving to Miami University in 2007 and Indiana University in 2011 . CESS currently maintains no institutional Secretariat.

== Activities ==
CESS has held an annual conference since 2000, usually in October. The conferences are held at various universities throughout Canada, the United States, and Central E. The 2012 conference was held at Indiana University in Bloomington, Indiana

The society's first international conference (called a "regional conference") was held in August 2008 in Choktal, Kyrgyzstan.

Additionally, CESS presents two awards every year – a Book Award and a Best Graduate Student Paper Award. Each winner receives $500, and the best graduate student paper will be published in the academic journal Central Asian Survey.

== Publications ==
CESS's main publication was the Central Eurasian Studies Review, published bi-annually in the spring and summer. It was first published in January 2002. The publication is divided into four sections: Perspectives, Research Reports (for on-going research only), Conferences and Lecture Series, and Educational Resources and Developments. All current and past issues are available online.
