= Haqverdilər =

- Location within Azerbaijan
- Coordinates: 39°16′27″N 49°08′49″E
- Country: Azerbaijan
- Rayon: Neftchala
- Municipality: Yeniqışlaq
- Time zone: UTC+4 (AZT)
  - Summer (DST): UTC+5 (AZT)

Haqverdilər (also, Akhverdi and Akhverdili) is a village in the Neftchala Rayon of Azerbaijan. The village forms part of the municipality of Yeniqışlaq.
