= Xol Qaraqaşlı =

- Municipality
- Location within Azerbaijan
- Coordinates: 39°18′28″N 48°49′42″E
- Country: Azerbaijan
- Rayon: Neftchala

Population
  - Total: 2,839
- Time zone: UTC+4 (AZT)
  - Summer (DST): UTC+5 (AZT)

Xol Qaraqaşlı (also, Xolqaraqaşlı, Khol-Karagashly, and Kholkarakashly) is a village and municipality in the Neftchala Rayon of Azerbaijan. It has a population of 2,839. The municipality consists of the villages of Xol Qaraqaşlı and Mürsəqulu.
