= Ustye Kury =

- Location within Azerbaijan
- Coordinates: 39°18′N 49°24′E
- Country: Azerbaijan
- Rayon: Neftchala
- Time zone: UTC+4 (AZT)
  - Summer (DST): UTC+5 (AZT)

Ustye Kury (also, Ust’ye Kury) is a village in the Neftchala Rayon of Azerbaijan.
