= Kara-Oy =

Kara-Oy (Кара-Ой) may refer to the following places in Kyrgyzstan:

- Kara-Oy, Issyk-Kul, in the Issyk-Kul District, Issyk-Kul Region
- Kara-Oy, Naryn, in the Ak-Talaa District, Naryn Region
- Kara-Oy, Osh, in the Nookat District, Osh Region
- Kara-Oy, Talas, in the Talas District, Talas Region
