= Yeniqışlaq =

- Municipality
- Location within Azerbaijan
- Coordinates: 39°16′03″N 49°13′11″E
- Country: Azerbaijan
- Rayon: Neftchala

Population
  - Total: 652
- Time zone: UTC+4 (AZT)
  - Summer (DST): UTC+5 (AZT)

Yeniqışlaq (also, Imeni Dvadtsat’-Shesti Bakinskiskikh Komissarov, Yeni-Kishlag, Yeni-Kishlak, and Yenikyshlak) is a village and municipality in the Neftchala Rayon of Azerbaijan. It has a population of 652. The municipality consists of the villages of Yeniqışlaq and Haqverdilər.
