= Mürsəqulu =

- Location within Azerbaijan
- Coordinates: 39°19′N 48°48′E
- Country: Azerbaijan
- Rayon: Neftchala
- Municipality: Xol Qaraqaşlı
- Time zone: UTC+4 (AZT)
  - Summer (DST): UTC+5 (AZT)

Mürsəqulu (also, Myursagulu and Mursa-Kuli) is a village in the Neftchala Rayon of Azerbaijan. The village forms part of the municipality of Xol Qaraqaşlı.
