= Tamchy =

Tamchy Тамчы
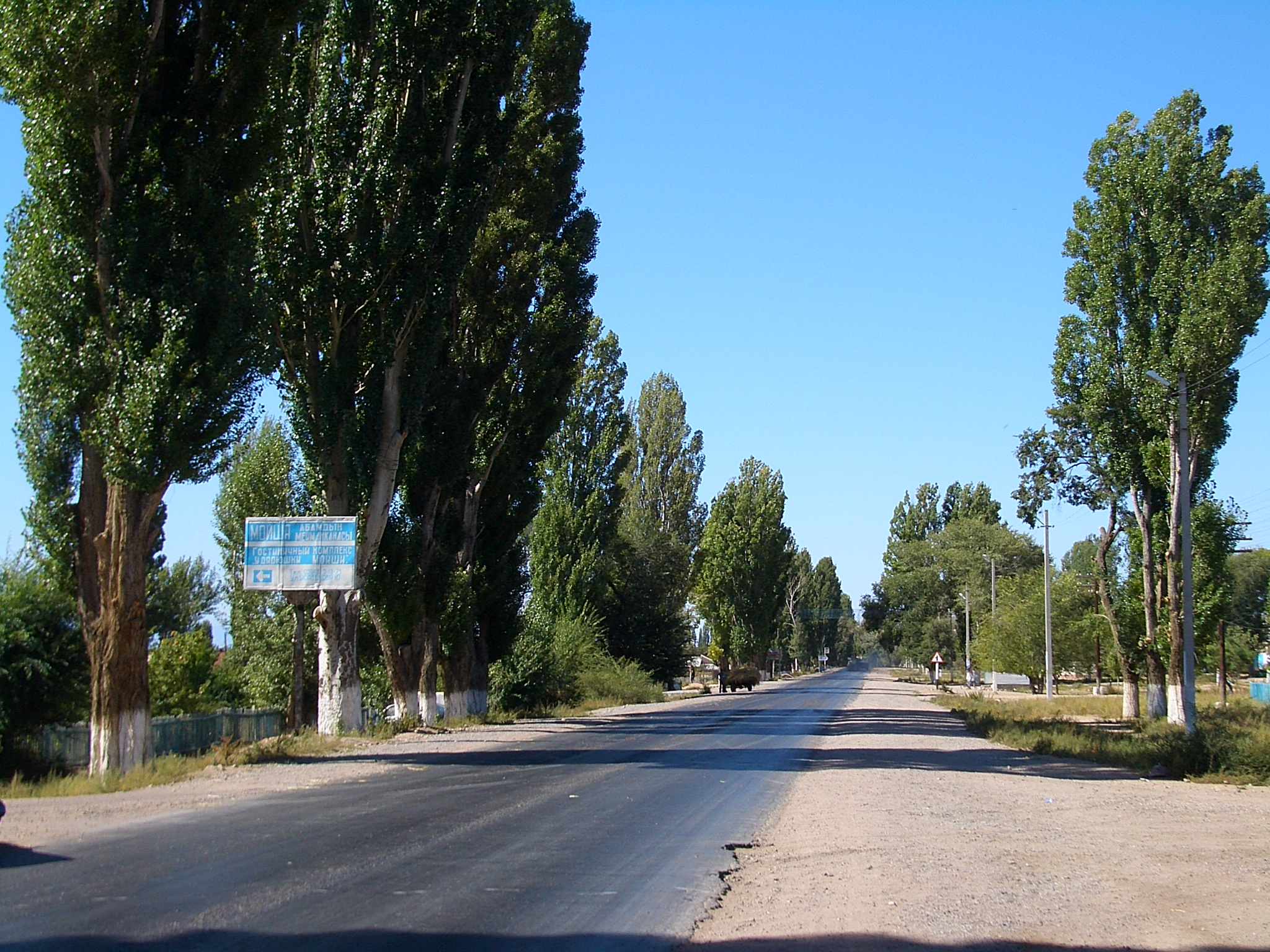
- Main street of Tamchy

- Location within Kyrgyzstan
- Coordinates: 42°33′36″N 76°39′0″E
- Country: Kyrgyzstan
- Region: Issyk-Kul Region
- District: Issyk-Kul District
- Elevation: 1,601 m (5,253 ft)

Population (2023)
  - Total: 2,438
- Time zone: UTC+6

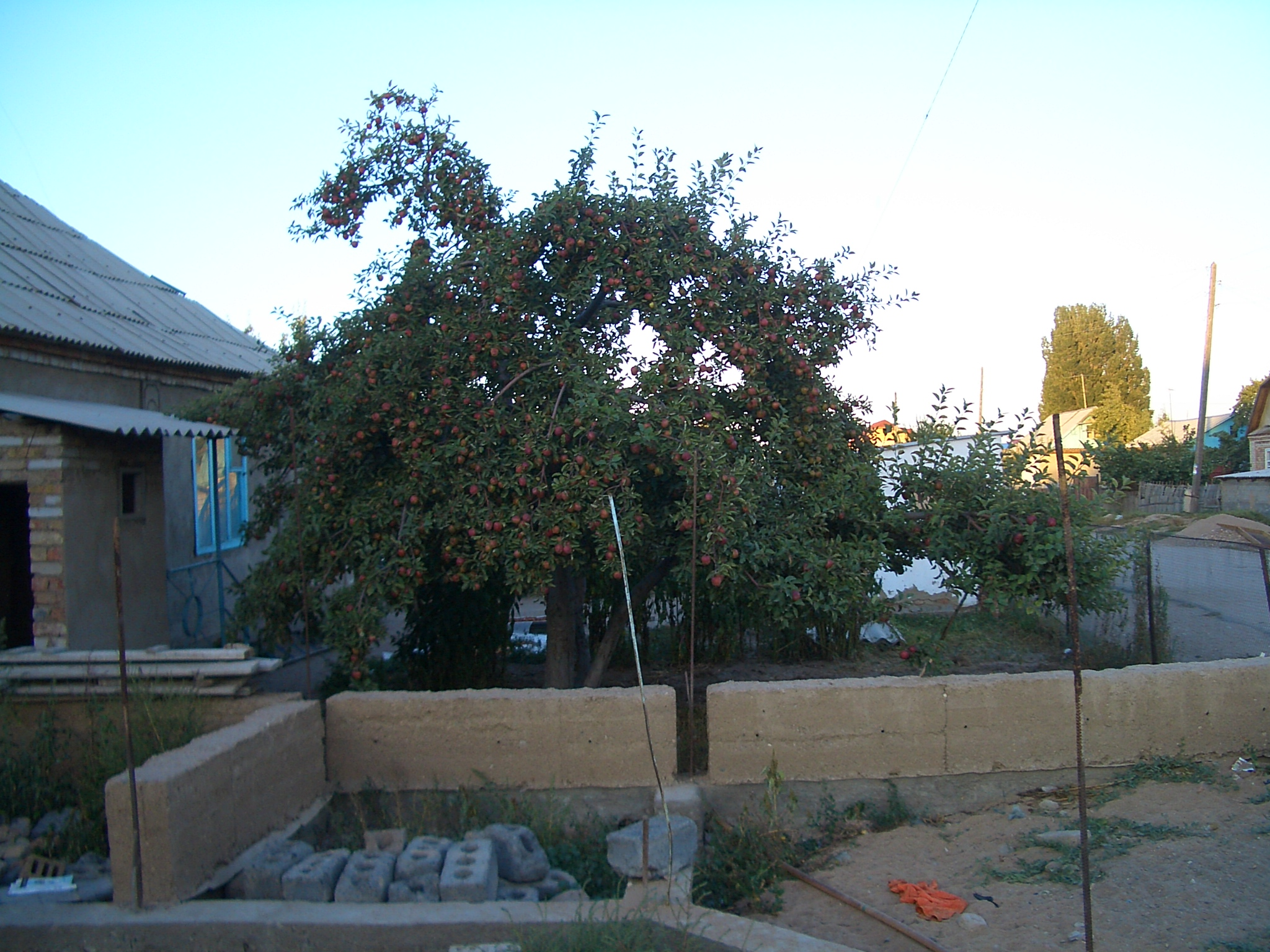
Apples ripen in September in villagers' yards

Tamchy (Note: Kyrgyz: Тамчы, romanized: Tamchy, IPA: [tʰɑmtɕʰɯ́]; Russian: Тамчы, romanized: Tamčy, IPA: [tɐmˈtɕɨ]) is a village in the Issyk-Kul District of the Issyk-Kul Region of Kyrgyzstan. Its population was 2,412 in 2021.

== Geography ==
Tamchy is located on the north shore of Lake Issyk Kul, between Balykchy and Cholpon Ata on highway A363. To the west is Kosh Kol.

== Natural environment ==
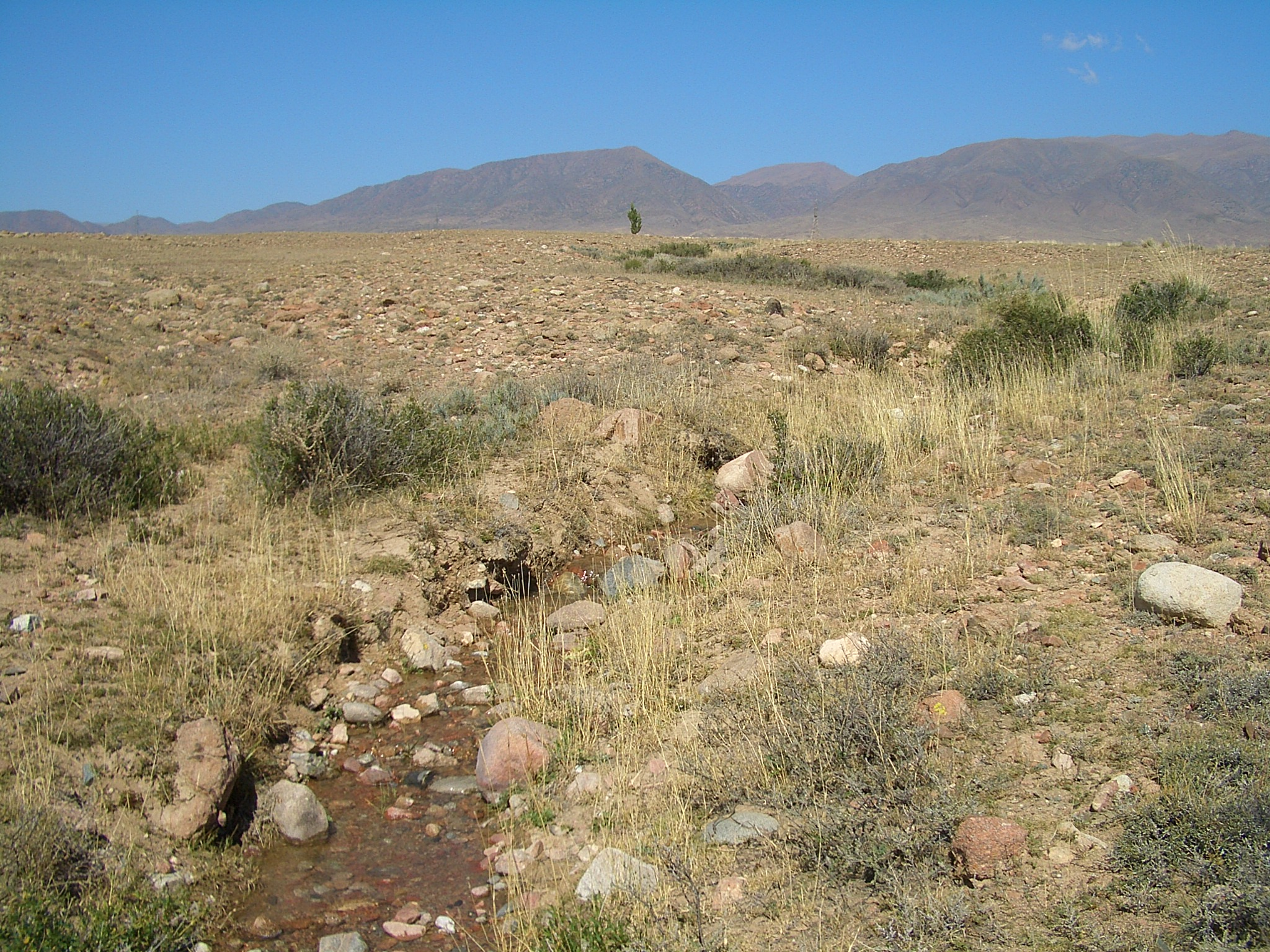
The aryk (channelled stream) that brings water from the mountains to the village

The village stretches for a couple kilometers along the shore of a bay formed by promontories at Kosh Kol (to the west) and Choktal (to the east). A gently raising desert plain stretches for over 10 kilometres (6.2 mi) north of the village, towards the foothills of the mountain range that separates Issyk Kul basin from the Kemin Valley farther north. Remote snow-covered mountain tops can be seen from the village, and, on a clear day, one can see the Tian Shan mountains across the lake to the south.

A creek flows from the mountains to the shore, bringing fresh water to the village. Along much of its course, the creek is artificially rerouted (and thus locally known as an aryk) to run not along the bottom of ravines and gulches, but on a high ground, so that it is possible to divert water from it for irrigation. However, as the amount of water in the creek is quite limited, only a few square kilometers of land around the village is actually irrigated. Village houses are often surrounded by orchards, apples and walnuts being local favorites.

Tamchy is one of the popular family beach vacation destinations on Issyk Kul's north shore. Much less developed than Cholpon Ata, it is popular with both the Bishkek middle class and budget travellers from as far away as central Russia and Siberia. Unlike its western neighbor, Kosh Kol, Tamchy was spared the large-scale resort development during the Soviet era, and its hospitality industry consists mostly of smaller, family-run guesthouses.

== Transportation ==
Tamchy is located on the highway that runs along the north shore of Issyk Kul, and is served by passenger vans and buses operating on Bishkek-Balykchy-Cholpon Ata-Karakol route.

The Tamchy Airport, the largest on the lake, is located approximately 5 kilometres (3.1 mi) to the east of the village. In 2006 plans were announced for a major upgrade.
