= Uzunbabalı =

- Location within Azerbaijan
- Coordinates: 39°25′14″N 49°11′48″E
- Country: Azerbaijan
- Rayon: Neftchala
- Municipality: Mirzəqurbanlı
- Time zone: UTC+4 (AZT)
  - Summer (DST): UTC+5 (AZT)

Uzunbabalı (also, Usun-Babaly and Uzunbabaly) is a village in the Neftchala Rayon of Azerbaijan. The village forms part of the municipality of Mirzəqurbanlı.
