= Karaakhmedli =

- Location within Azerbaijan
- Coordinates: 39°24′44″N 48°58′22″E
- Country: Azerbaijan
- Rayon: Neftchala
- Time zone: UTC+4 (AZT)
  - Summer (DST): UTC+5 (AZT)

Karaakhmedli (also, Kara-Akhmedly) is a village in the Neftchala Rayon of Azerbaijan.
