= Qızqayıtdı =

- Location within Azerbaijan
- Coordinates: 39°13′17″N 49°10′33″E
- Country: Azerbaijan
- Rayon: Neftchala
- Municipality: Mikayıllı

Population (2014)
  - Total: 3
- Time zone: UTC+4 (AZT)

Qızqayıtdı (also, Kyzgayytdy, Kyzkaity, and Kyzkayty) is a village in the Neftchala Rayon of Azerbaijan. The village forms part of the municipality of Mikayıllı. According to Azerbaijan's State Statistics Committee, only three people lived in the village as of 2014.
