= Meshdally =

- Location within Azerbaijan
- Coordinates: 39°13′N 49°13′E
- Country: Azerbaijan
- Rayon: Neftchala
- Time zone: UTC+4 (AZT)
  - Summer (DST): UTC+5 (AZT)

Meshdally (also, Mashtaly) is a village in the Neftchala Rayon of Azerbaijan.
