= Ramazanlı =

Place in Neftchala, Azerbaijan

- Location within Azerbaijan
- Coordinates: 39°23′03″N 48°47′07″E
- Country: Azerbaijan
- Rayon: Neftchala
- Municipality: Qaçaqkənd
- Time zone: UTC+4 (AZT)
  - Summer (DST): UTC+5 (AZT)

Ramazanlı (also, Ramazanly) is a village in the Neftchala Rayon of Azerbaijan. The village forms part of the municipality of Qaçaqkənd.
