= Bosteri =

Bosteri Бостери
- Beach "Tolkun" in Bosteri during sunny weather. June 2022.

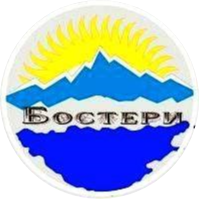
- Coat of arms

- Location within Kyrgyzstan
- Coordinates: 42°39′0″N 77°10′48″E
- Country: Kyrgyzstan
- Region: Issyk-Kul Region
- District: Issyk-Kul District
- Established: ca. 1755

Government
  - Ayil Okmotu: Uchkurkaev Zamir
- Elevation: 1,601 m (5,253 ft)

Population (2023)
  - Total: 9,055
- Time zone: UTC+6
- Area code: 722316

Bosteri is a village in the Issyk-Kul Region of Kyrgyzstan. It is part of the Issyk-Kul District. Its population was 8,908 in 2021. The town is entirely devoted to mass tourism. There are soviet-era hotels and sanitoria. To the west along highway A363 is Cholpon-Ata, and to the east Korumdu.

== Population ==
Historical population
Year	Pop.	±% p.a.
2009	7,415	—
2021	8,908	+1.54%
Note: resident population; Sources:

=== Notable individuals ===
Asylgul Abdurekhmenova
