= Dalğalı, Neftchala =

Dalğalı
- Location within Azerbaijan
- Coordinates: 39°10′13″N 49°13′39″E
- Country: Azerbaijan
- Rayon: Neftchala
- Time zone: UTC+4 (AZT)
  - Summer (DST): UTC+5 (AZT)

Dalğalı (known as Prorva until 1998) is a village in the municipality of Mikayıllı in the Neftchala District of Azerbaijan.
