= Tatarməhlə =

- Municipality
- Location within Azerbaijan
- Coordinates: 39°25′58″N 49°07′11″E
- Country: Azerbaijan
- Rayon: Neftchala

Population
  - Total: 1,111
- Time zone: UTC+4 (AZT)
  - Summer (DST): UTC+5 (AZT)

Tatarməhlə (also, Tataramagla and Tatarmagla) is a village and municipality in the Neftchala Rayon of Azerbaijan. It has a population of 1,111. The municipality consists of the villages of Tatarməhlə and Abasallı.
