= Temir, Kyrgyzstan =

Temir Темир
- Location within Kyrgyzstan
- Coordinates: 42°42′0″N 77°24′36″E
- Country: Kyrgyzstan
- Region: Issyk-Kul
- District: Issyk-Kul
- Elevation: 1,675 m (5,495 ft)

Population (2023)
  - Total: 5,002
- Time zone: UTC+6

Temir (Kyrgyz: Темир, Russian: Темировка - Temirovka) is a village in the Issyk-Kul Region of Kyrgyzstan. It is part of the Issyk-Kul District. Its population was 4,849 in 2021. Temir / Темир means "iron" in Kyrgyz.
