= Chong-Sary-Oy =

Chong-Sary-Oy Чоң-Сары-Ой
- Location within Kyrgyzstan
- Coordinates: 42°36′36″N 76°56′24″E
- Country: Kyrgyzstan
- Region: Issyk-Kul Region
- District: Issyk-Kul District
- Elevation: 1,620 m (5,310 ft)

Population (2023)
  - Total: 3,430
- Time zone: UTC+6

Chong-Sary-Oy (Kyrgyz: Чоң-Сары-Ой) is a village in the Issyk-Kul Region of Kyrgyzstan. It is part of the Issyk-Kul District. Its population was 3,328 in 2021. This village marks the free road and hiking border crossing between Kyrgyzstan and Kazakhstan known as Pereval Ozernyy. Its Kazakh counterpart is Almaty.
