= Örüktü-Khutor =

Örüktü-Khutor Өрүктү-Хутор
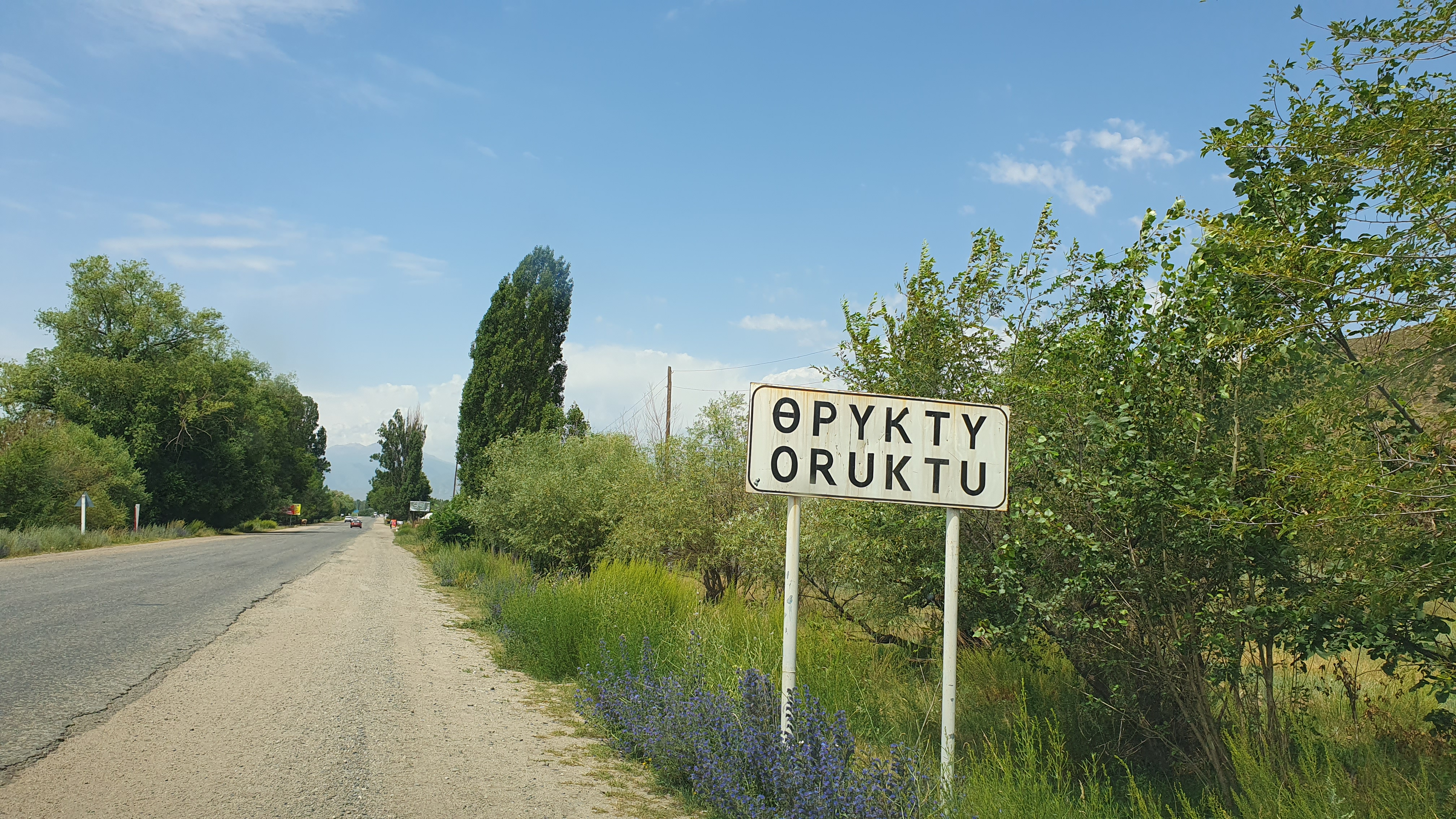

- Location within Kyrgyzstan
- Coordinates: 42°44′19″N 77°49′13″E
- Country: Kyrgyzstan
- Region: Issyk-Kul Region
- District: Issyk-Kul District
- Elevation: 1,675 m (5,495 ft)

Population (2023)
  - Total: 834
- Time zone: UTC+6

Örüktü-Khutor (Kyrgyz: Өрүктү-Хутор) is a village in the Issyk-Kul Region of Kyrgyzstan. It is part of the Issyk-Kul District. Its population was 815 in 2021.

== Population ==
Historical population
Year	Pop.	±% p.a.
2009	627	—
2021	815	+2.21%
Note: resident population; Sources:
