= Kök-Döbö =

Kök-Döbö Көк-Дөбө
- Location within Kyrgyzstan
- Coordinates: 42°45′36″N 77°36′36″E
- Country: Kyrgyzstan
- Region: Issyk-Kul Region
- District: Issyk-Kul District
- Elevation: 1,741 m (5,712 ft)

Population (2023)
  - Total: 967
- Time zone: UTC+6

Kök-Döbö (Kyrgyz: Көк-Дөбө) is a village in the Issyk-Kul Region of Kyrgyzstan. It is part of the Issyk-Kul District. Its population was 947 in 2021.
