= Örnök =

Örnök Өрнөк
- Location within Kyrgyzstan
- Coordinates: 42°35′50″N 76°51′50″E
- Country: Kyrgyzstan
- Region: Issyk-Kul Region
- District: Issyk-Kul District

Population (2023)
  - Total: 1,410
- Time zone: UTC+6

Örnök is a village in Issyk-Kul Region of Kyrgyzstan. It is part of the Issyk-Kul District. Its population was 1,397 in 2021.
