= Xanməmmədli, Neftchala =

Xanməmmədli
- Location within Azerbaijan
- Coordinates: 39°23′57″N 48°47′26″E
- Country: Azerbaijan
- Rayon: Neftchala
- Municipality: Qaçaqkənd
- Time zone: UTC+4 (AZT)
  - Summer (DST): UTC+5 (AZT)

Xanməmmədli (also, Khanmamedli and Khanmedty) is a village in the Neftchala Rayon of Azerbaijan. The village forms part of the municipality of Qaçaqkənd.
