= Karool-Döbö =

Karool-Döbö Кароол-Дөбө
- Location within Kyrgyzstan
- Coordinates: 42°46′48″N 77°42′36″E
- Country: Kyrgyzstan
- Region: Issyk-Kul Region
- District: Issyk-Kul District
- Elevation: 1,966 m (6,450 ft)

Population (2023)
  - Total: 1,063
- Time zone: UTC+6

Karool-Döbö (Kyrgyz: Кароол-Дөбө) is a village in the Issyk-Kul Region of Kyrgyzstan. It is part of the Issyk-Kul District. Its population was 1,061 in 2021.
