= Issyk-Kul District =

- District
- Ысык-Көл району (Kyrgyz); Иссык-Кульский район (Russian)
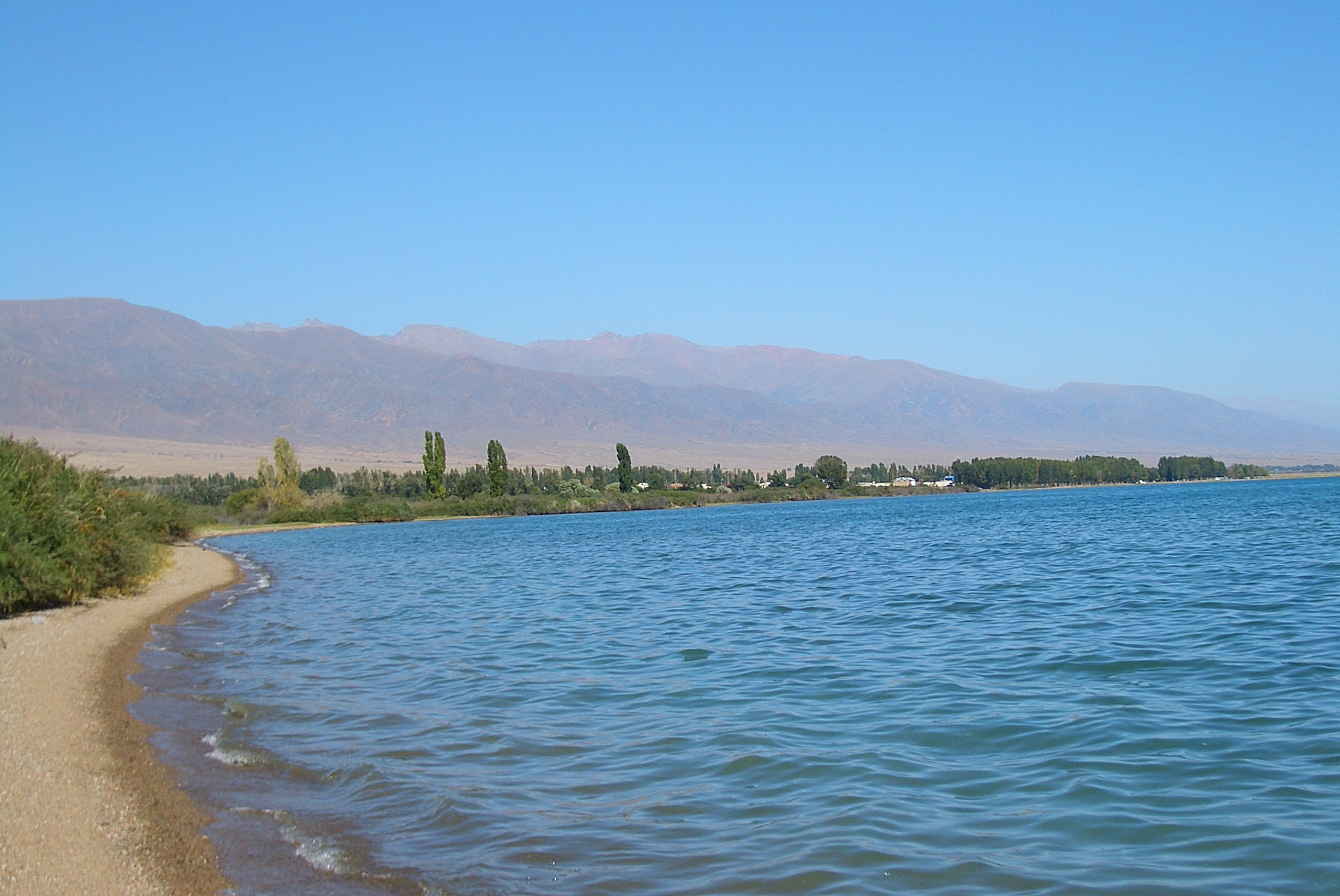
- Lake Issyk Kul shoreline at Tamchy, Issyk Kul district

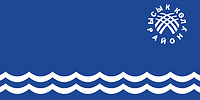
- Flag

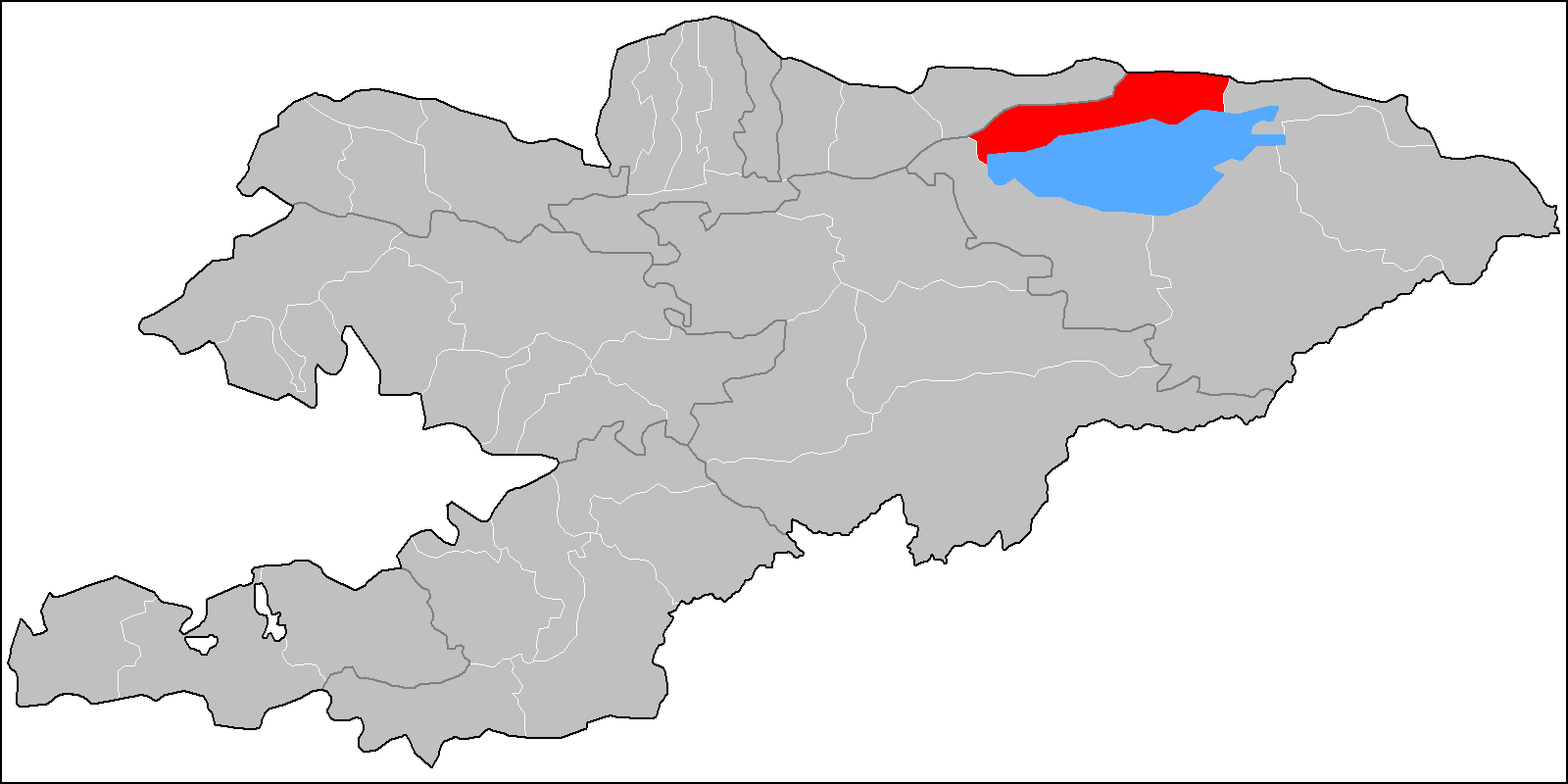
- Coordinates: 42°39′N 77°05′E
- Country: Kyrgyzstan
- Region: Issyk-Kul

Area
  - Total: 3,603 km^{2} (1,391 sq mi)

Population (2023)
  - Total: 98,435
  - Density: 27.32/km^{2} (70.76/sq mi)
- Time zone: UTC+06:00

Issyk-Kul District (Kyrgyz: Ысык-Көл району, romanized: Ysyk-Köl raionu) is a district of Issyk-Kul Region in northeastern Kyrgyzstan. The seat lies at Cholpon-Ata. Its area is 3,603 square kilometres (1,391 sq mi), and its resident population was 84,876 in 2021.

== Geography ==
The district is located on the northern shore of Issyk-Kul and on the southern slopes of the Küngöy Ala-Too Range, which dominate much of the landscape. The topography varies from multiple-folded medium-altitude mountains featuring in erosional dissection to alluvial - proluvial planes with river fans, river valleys, intermittent water streams, and lakeside planes of Issyk-Kul lake area. Approximately 78% of the district is occupied by mountains, and 22% - by valleys. The hydrological conditions are dominated by rivers Toru-Aygyr with peak flood of 30 m/s, Orto Taldy-Bulak - 6.5 m/s, Chong Taldy-Bulak - 7 m/s, Cholpon-Ata - 20 m/s, Dyure-Suu - 15 m/s, Kichi Ak-Suu - 10 m/s, Orto Koy-Suu - 10 m/s, Orto Oryuktyu - 10 m/s, Chong Oryuktyu - 20 m/s, Chet Baysoorun - 15 m/s, and Cong Baysoorun - 20 m/s.

== Climate ==
An average temperature in January is -2°C in valleys, and -10°C in mountains. In July, an average temperature varies from +18°C in valleys, to +10°C in mountains. An absolute recorded temperature minimum is -30°. Average maximum temperatures are +35°C in valleys, and +15°C in mountains. Average yearly precipitation is 200-400 mm in valleys, and 500-600 mm in mountains during warm season (April-October), and 100-150 in valleys and 150-200 mm in mountains during cold season.

== Population ==
Historical population
| Year | Pop. | ±% p.a. |
|---|---|---|
| 1970 | 50,998 | — |
| 1979 | 58,389 | +1.52% |
| 1989 | 68,685 | +1.64% |
| 1999 | 70,677 | +0.29% |
| 2009 | 75,533 | +0.67% |
| 2021 | 84,876 | +0.98% |
Note: resident population; Sources:

== Populated places ==
In total, Issyk-Kul District include 1 town and 30 settlements in 12 rural communities (ayyl aymagy). Each rural community may include one or several villages. The rural communities and settlements in the Issyk-Kul District are:

1. town of district significance Cholpon-Ata
2. Abdrakhmanov (seat: Jarkynbaev; incl. Karool-Döbö)
3. Anan'yevo (seat: Anan'yevo; incl. Kök-Döbö and Chet-Baysoorun)
4. Bosteri (seat: Bosteri; incl. Baktuu-Dolonotu)
5. Kara-Oy (seat: Kara-Oy)
6. Kum-Bel (seat: Korumdu; incl. Bulan-Sögöttü)
7. Örüktü (seat: Chong-Örüktü; incl. Orto-Örüktü and Örüktü-Khutor)
8. Sadyr Ake (seat: Grigor'yevka; incl. Grigor'yevka Pristany)
9. Kozhoyar-Ata (seat: Kozhoyar-Ata; incl. Kojoyar)
10. Tamchy (seat: Tamchy; incl. Kosh-Köl and Chyrpykty)
11. Temir (seat: Temir; incl. Kashat)
12. Toru-Aygyr (seat: Toru-Aygyr; incl. Kyzyl-Örük and Sary-Kamysh)
13. Chong-Sary-Oy (seat: Chong-Sary-Oy; incl. Baetov, Örnök, Sary-Oy and Chok-Tal)
Settlements of the Ysyk-Kol District

== Gallery ==
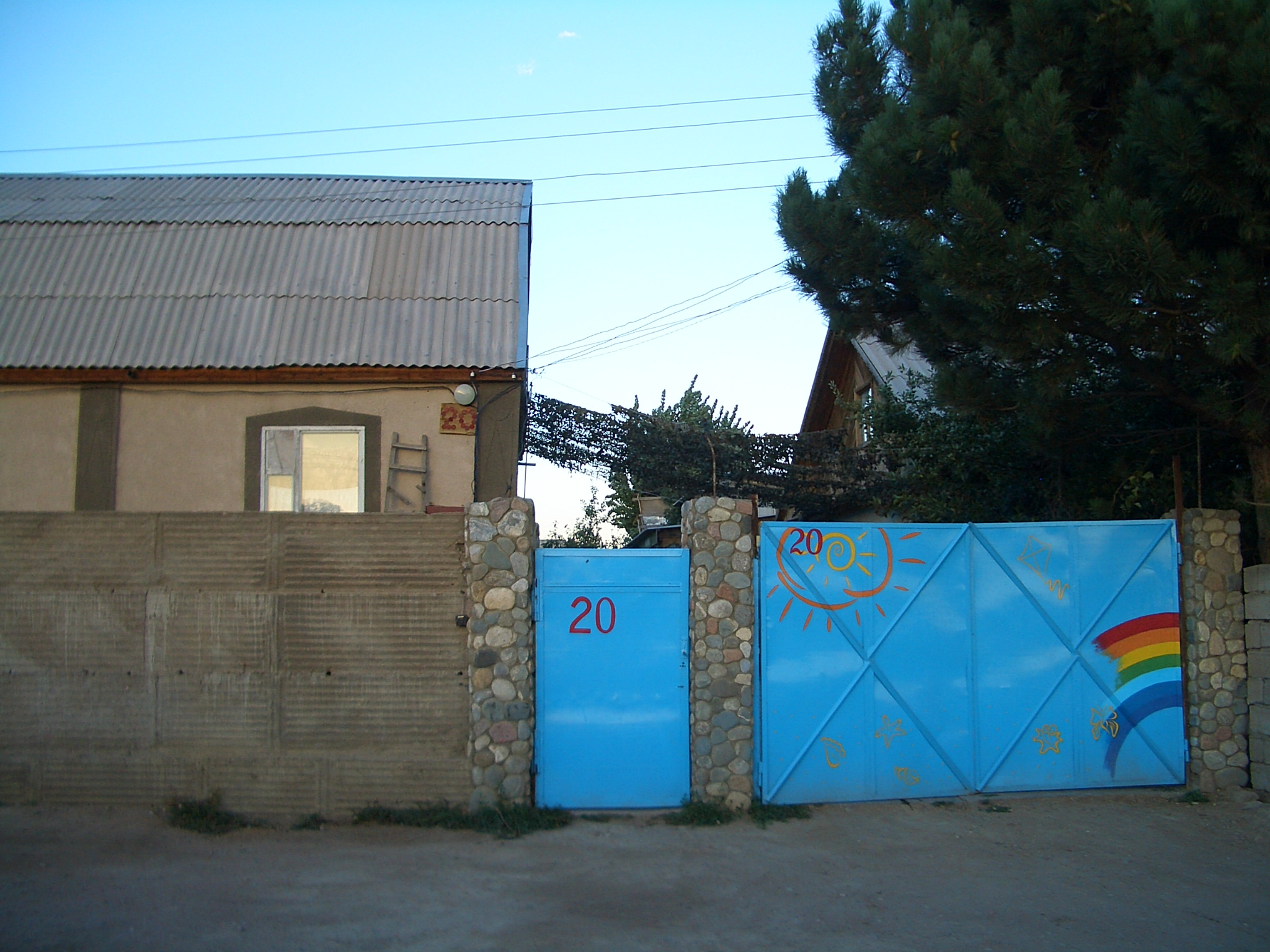
Guesthouse at Tamchy

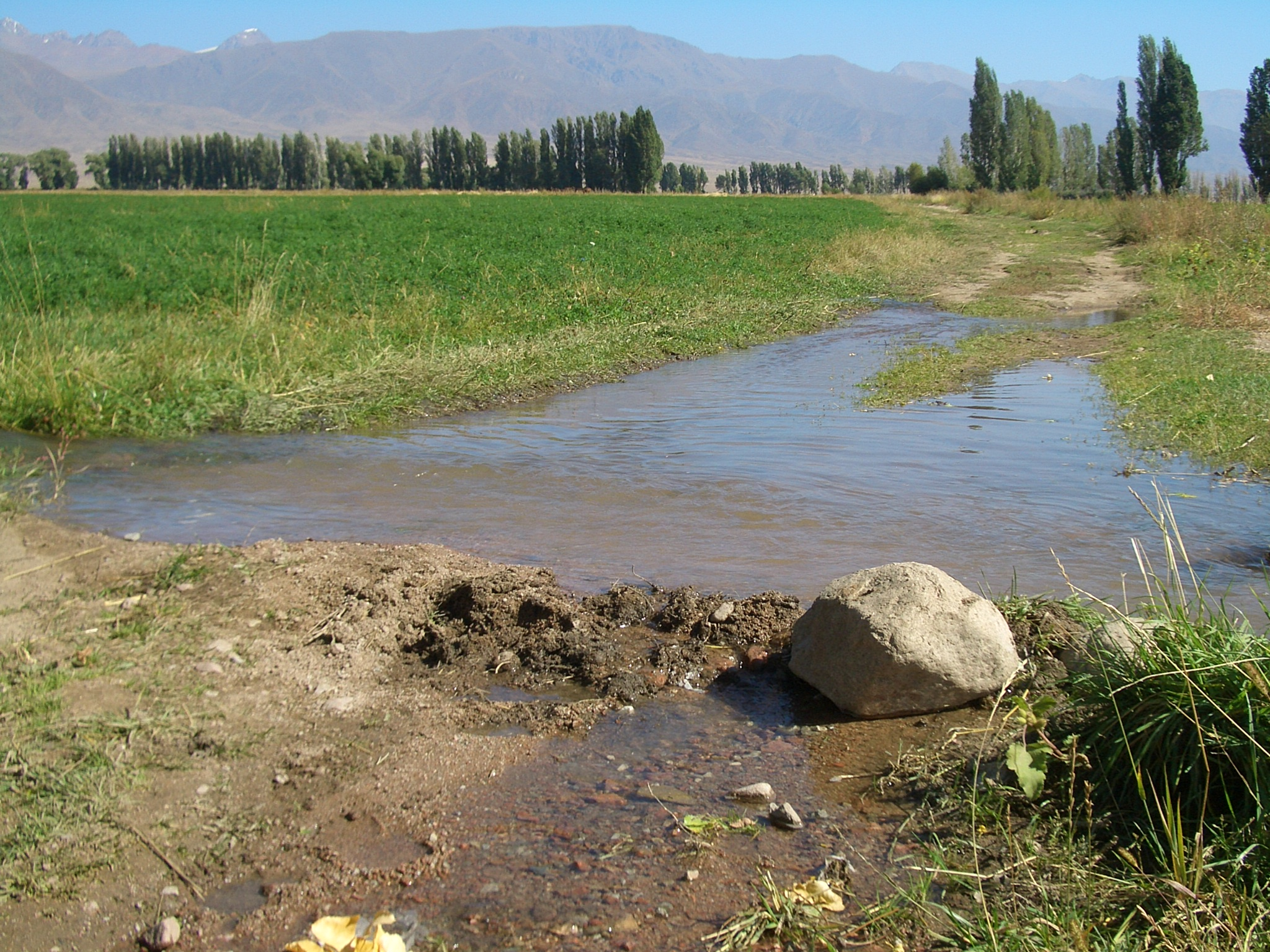
Irrigation

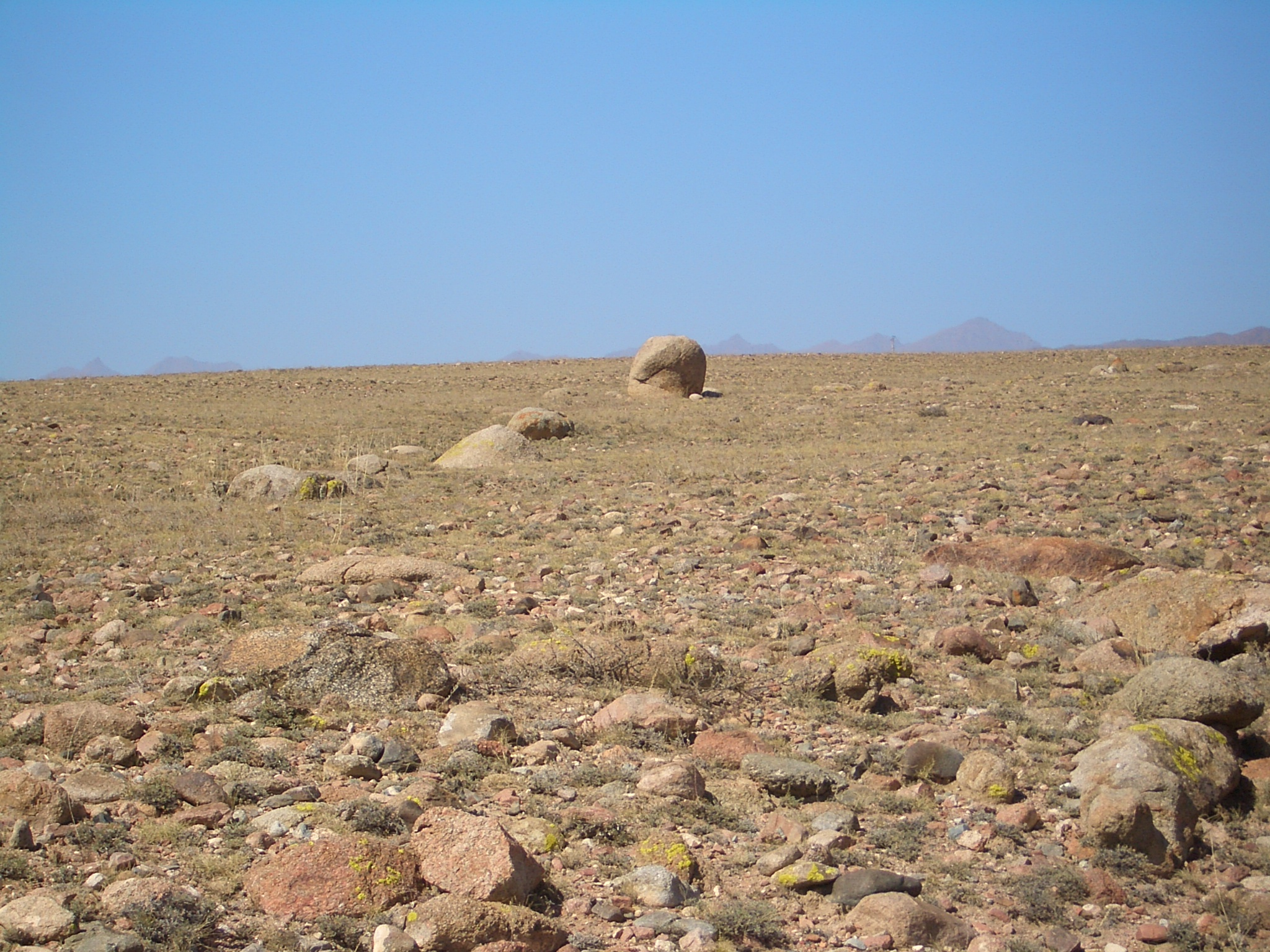
Desert above Tamchy

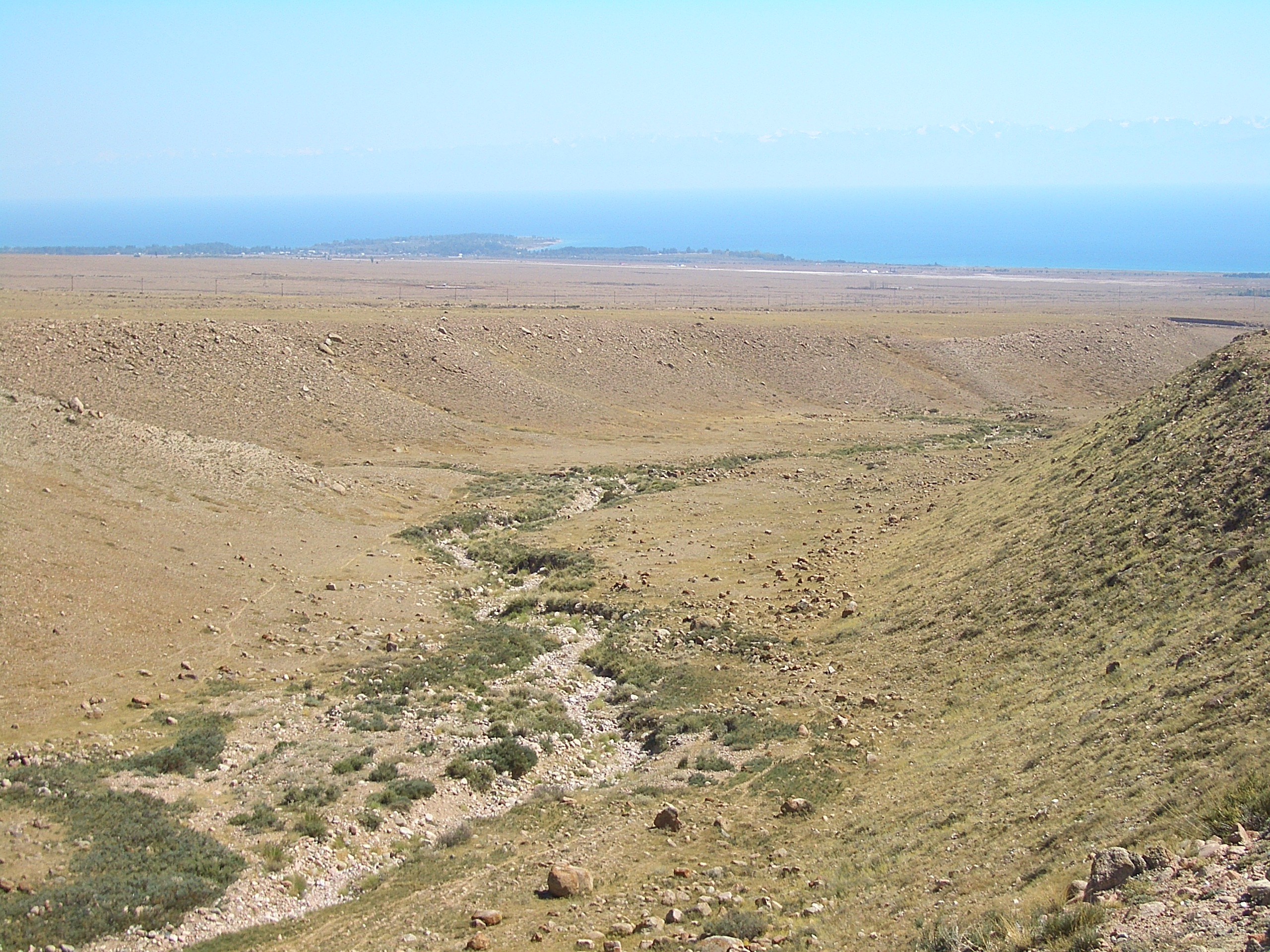
In the desert above Tamchy. Choktal peninsula in the background.

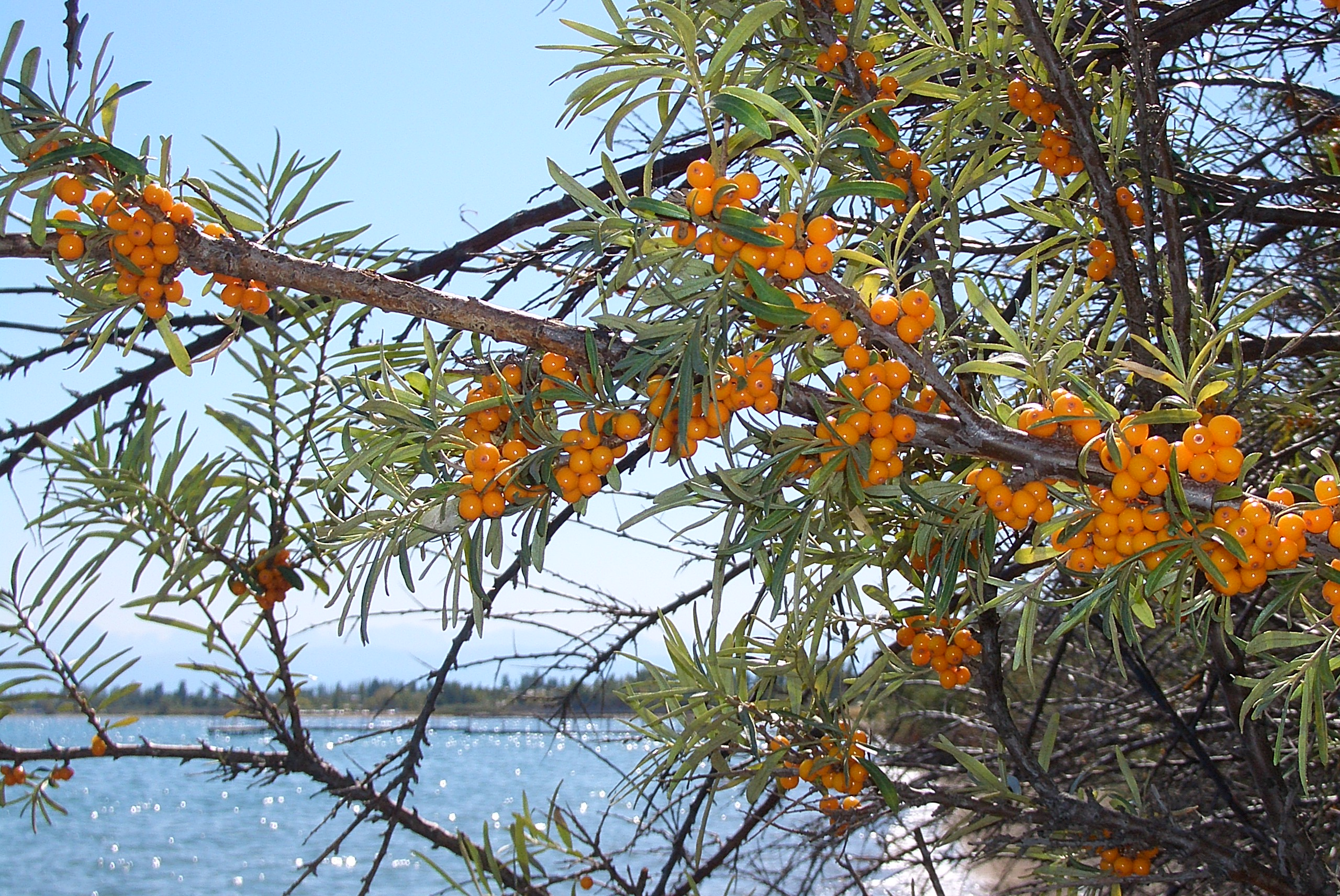
Sea buckthorn shrubs on the lake shore east of Kosh Köl

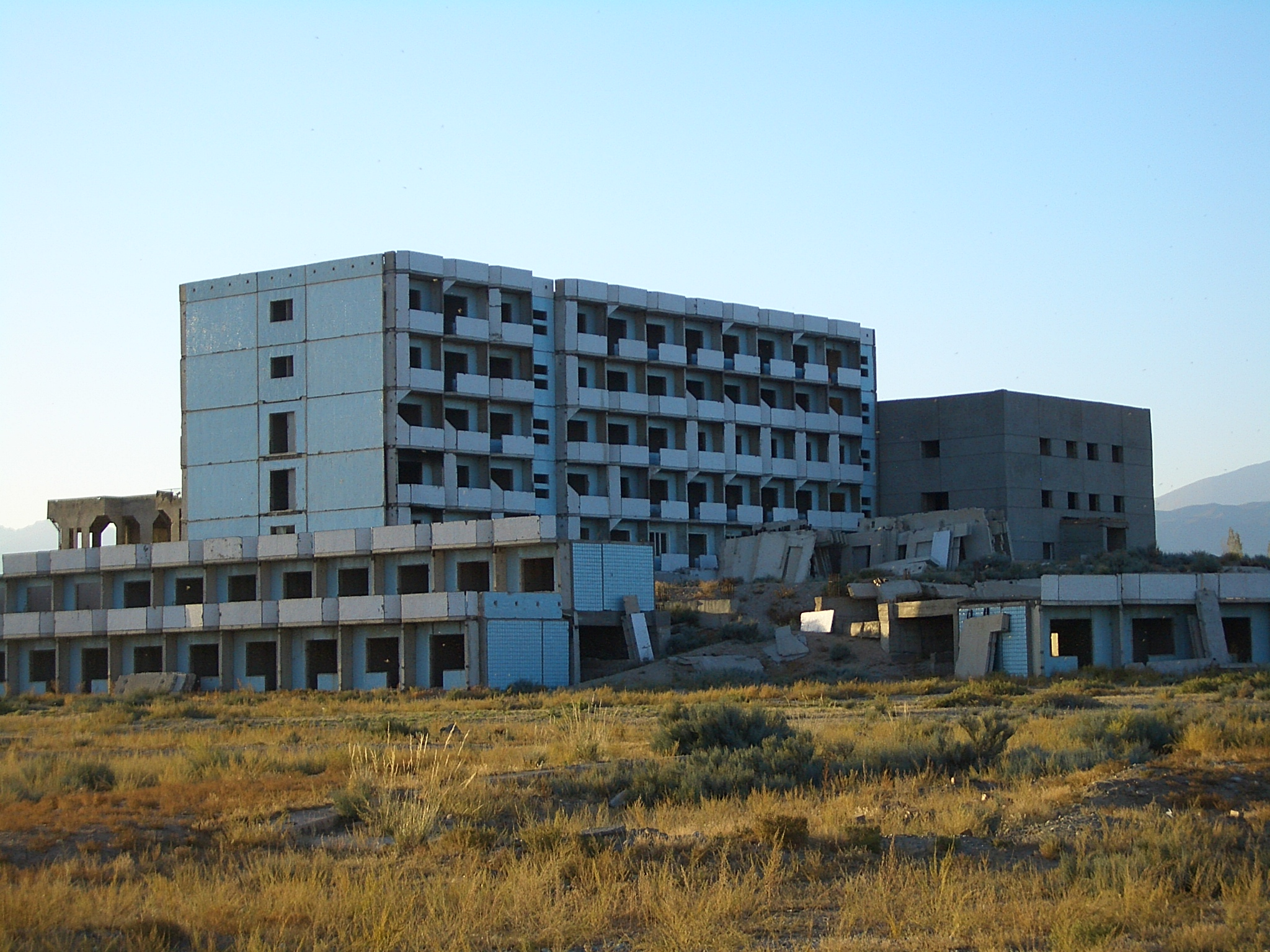
An abandoned resort at Kosh Köl.

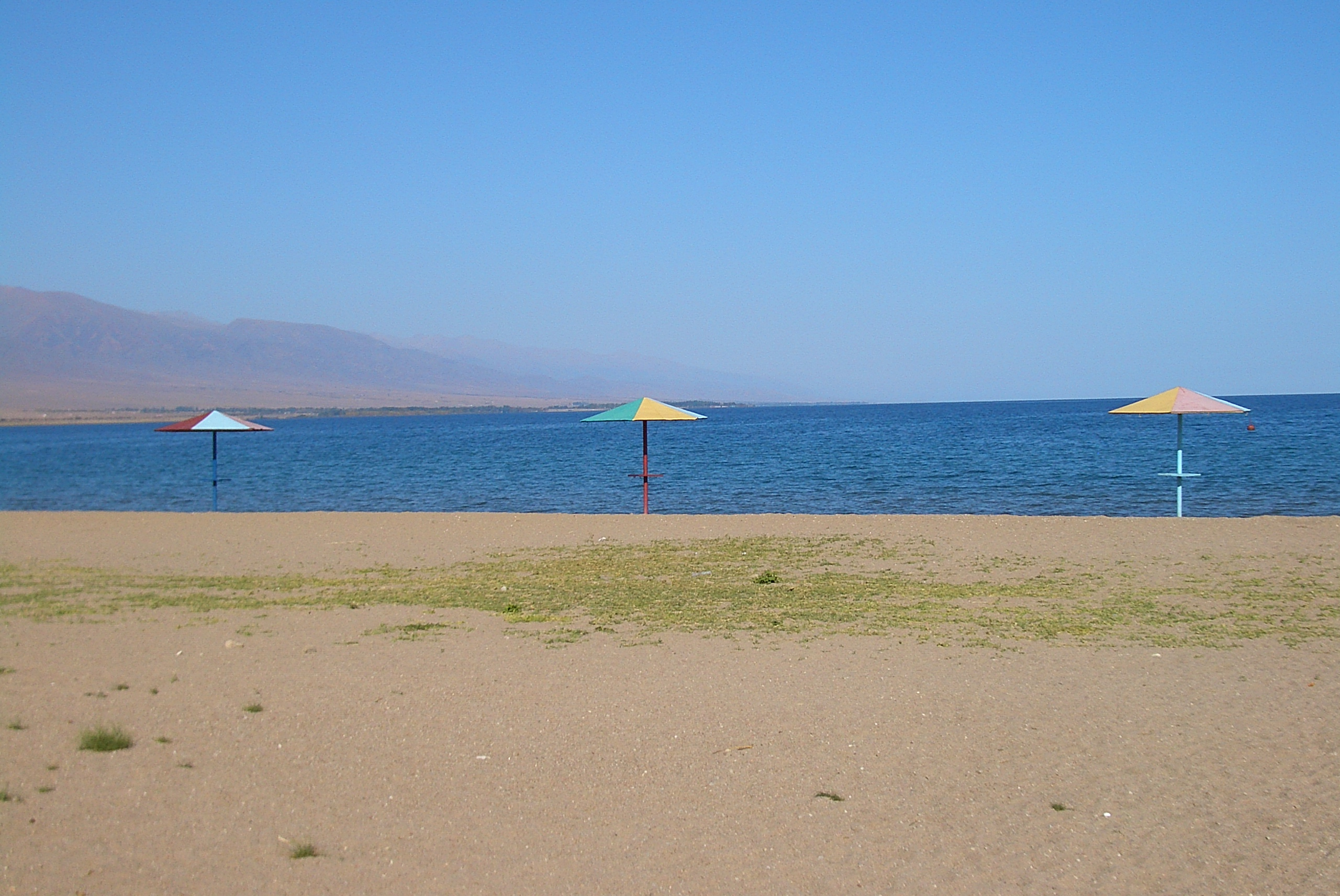
On the beach at Kosh Köl.

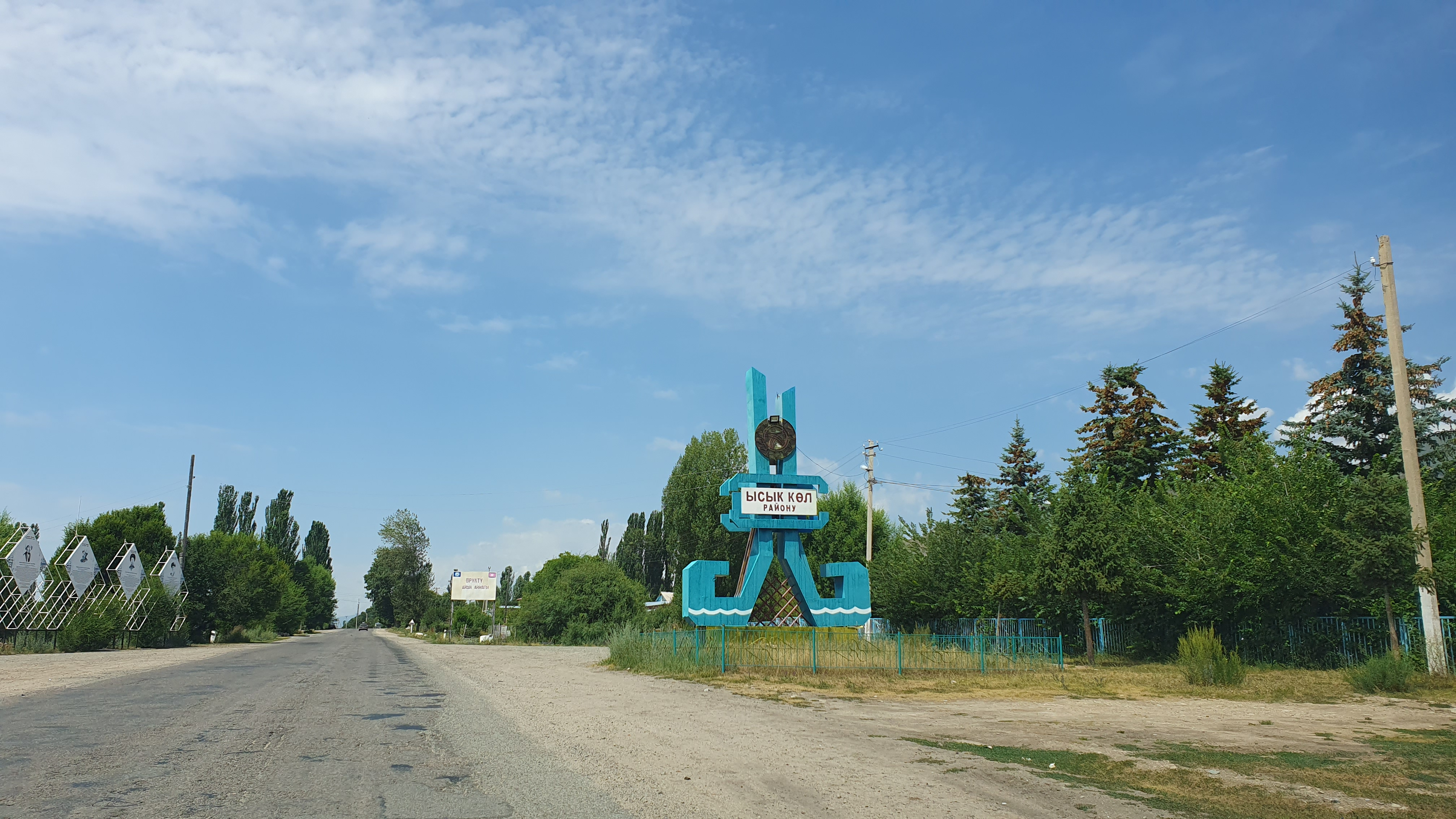
Eastern entrance to the district.
