= Jarkynbaev =

Jarkynbaev Жаркынбаев
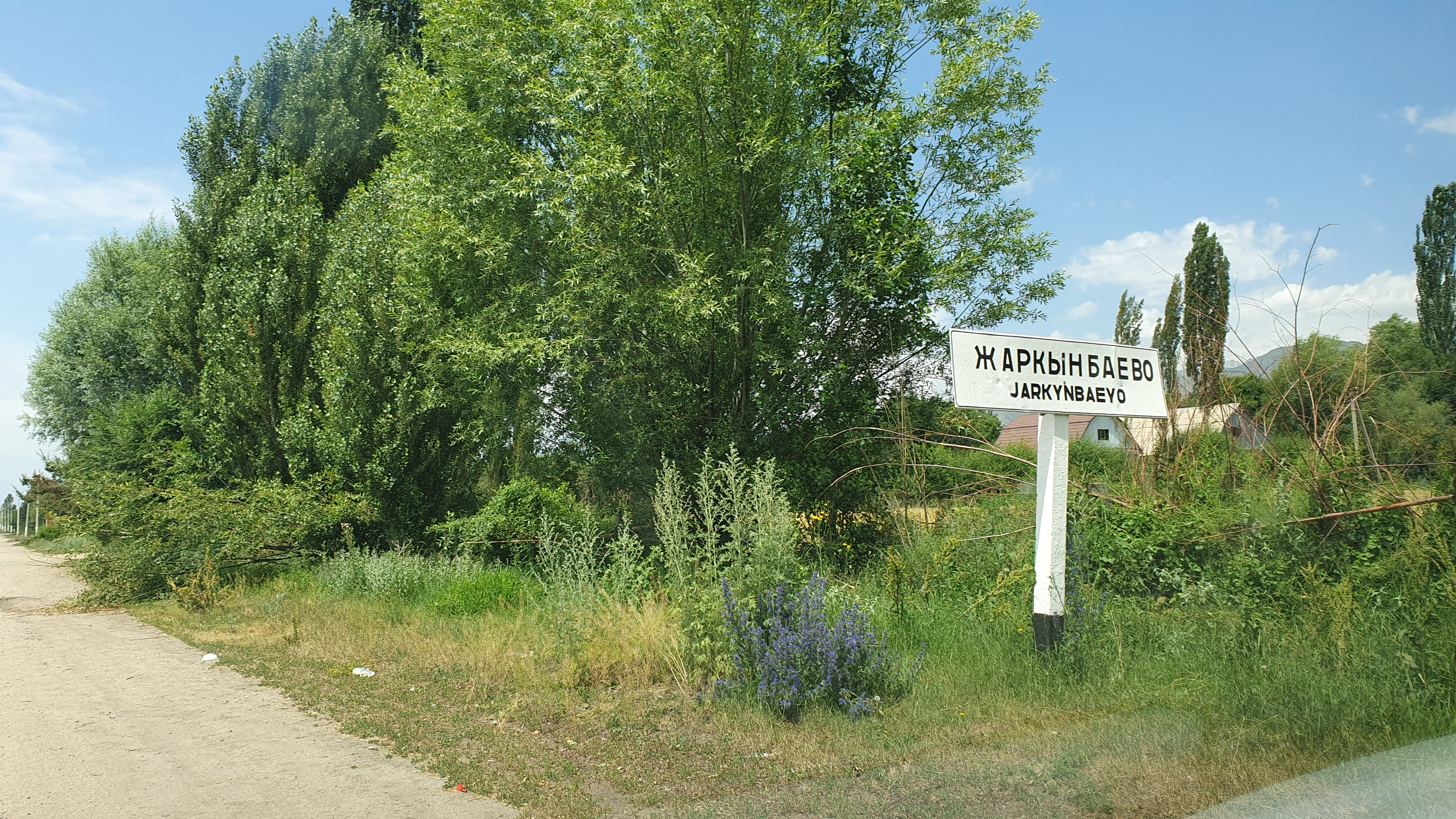

- Location within Kyrgyzstan
- Coordinates: 42°43′48″N 77°44′24″E
- Country: Kyrgyzstan
- Region: Issyk-Kul
- District: Issyk-Kul
- Elevation: 1,649 m (5,410 ft)

Population (2023)
  - Total: 2,458
- Time zone: UTC+6

Jarkynbaev (Kyrgyz: Жаркынбаев, Russian: Жаркынбаево - Zharkynbayevo) is a village in the Issyk-Kul Region of Kyrgyzstan. It is part of the Issyk-Kul District. Its population was 2,443 in 2021.
