= Baktuu-Dolonotu =

Village in Kyrgyzstan

- Location within Kyrgyzstan
- Coordinates: 42.65050°N 77.12730°E
- Country: Kyrgyzstan
- Region: Issyk-Kul Region
- District: Issyk-Kul District
- Time zone: UTC+6

Baktuu Dolonotu is a village in the Issyk-Kul Region of Kyrgyzstan. It falls in Issyk-Kul district.

== Terrain ==
The village is situated on the northern shore of Issyk-Kul lake at an elevation of about 2300 meters above sea level on the slopes of Tian Shan mountains.

== Landmarks ==
Baktuu-Dolonotu has a hippodrome which was constructed when the village hosted the 2nd World Nomad Games.

The village has several boarding and lodging facilities as it is a tourist destination.
