= Toru-Aygyr =

Toru-Aygyr Тору-Айгыр

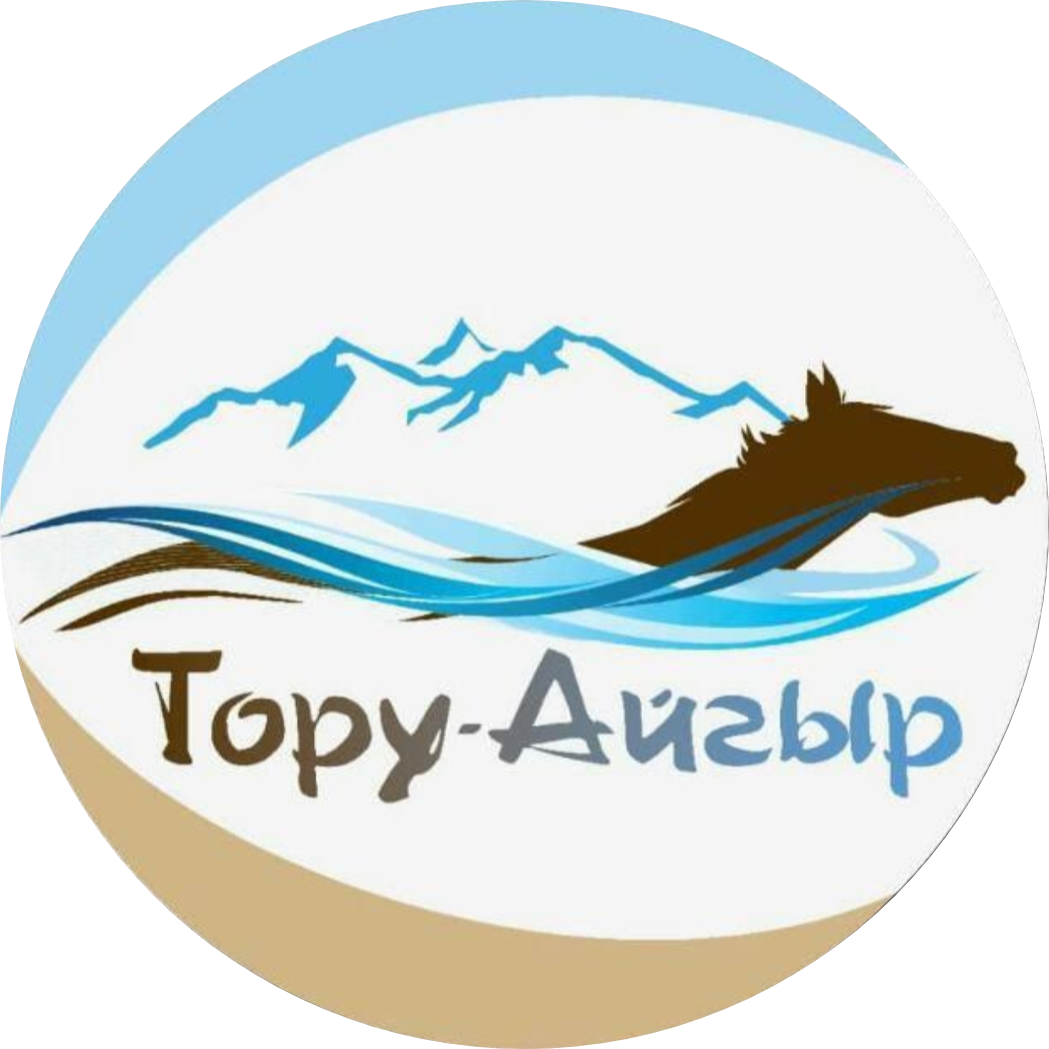
- Coat of arms

- Location within Kyrgyzstan
- Coordinates: 42°29′24″N 76°25′12″E
- Country: Kyrgyzstan
- Region: Issyk-Kul Region
- District: Issyk-Kul District
- Elevation: 1,638 m (5,374 ft)

Population (2023)
  - Total: 3,000
- Time zone: UTC+6

Toru-Aygyr, also known as Toraygyr, is a village in Issyk-Kul Region, Kyrgyzstan. It is part of the Issyk-Kul District. Its population was 2,967 in 2021.

== History ==
Toru-Aygyr was once the site of a medieval settlement which served as an important stop along one of the Silk Road routes connecting China with the West. Founded before the 13th century, it was initially a multicultural settlement whose inhabitants practiced a variety of faiths, including Tengrianism, Buddhism, and Nestorian Christianity. The region was ruled from the 10th century by the Karakhanids, a Turkic dynasty centered on Kyrgyzstan, before coming under the influence of the Golden Horde, a Mongol state that introduced Islam to the area in the 13th century. The city's character shifted as it became increasingly Muslim, with archaeological evidence including a large Islamic cemetery spanning roughly 14 acres and the remains of a possible mosque or madrassa. At the beginning of the 15th century, a major earthquake caused the city to sink beneath the waters of Lake Issyk-Kul, an event archaeologists have compared in scale to the destruction of Pompeii. The submerged ruins were explored by a joint Kyrgyz-Russian archaeological expedition in 2025, and include kiln-fired brick buildings, a grain mill, wooden beams, and ceramic vessels.
