= Sahiloba =

- Location within Azerbaijan
- Coordinates: 39°07′42″N 49°13′00″E
- Country: Azerbaijan
- Rayon: Neftchala
- Municipality: Mikayıllı
- Time zone: UTC+4 (AZT)
  - Summer (DST): UTC+5 (AZT)

Sahiloba (until 2008, Saratovka and Saratovsk) is a village in the Neftchala Rayon of Azerbaijan. The village forms part of the municipality of Mikayıllı.
