= Mikayıllı, Neftchala =

Mikayıllı
- Municipality
- Location within Azerbaijan
- Coordinates: 39°13′03″N 49°11′20″E
- Country: Azerbaijan
- Rayon: Neftchala

Population
  - Total: 618
- Time zone: UTC+4 (AZT)
  - Summer (DST): UTC+5 (AZT)

Mikayıllı (also, Mikailly and Mikeyly) is a village and municipality in the Neftchala Rayon of Azerbaijan. It has a population of 618. The municipality consists of the villages of Mikayıllı, Qızqayıtdı, Dalğalı (formerly Prorva), Kürdili, Sahiloba (formerly Saratovka), and Sarıqamış.
