= Kojoyar =

Kojoyar Кожояр
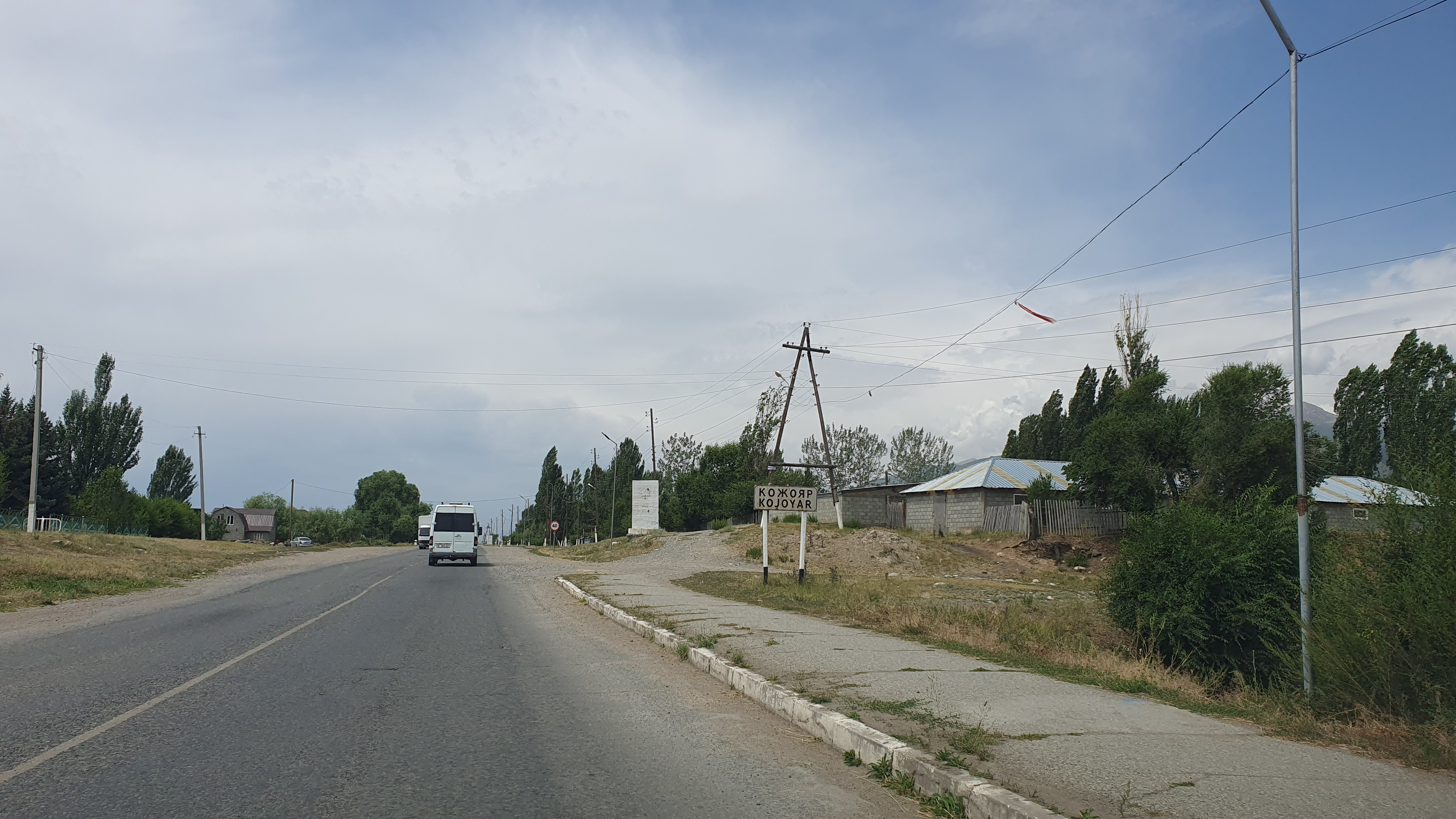

- Location within Kyrgyzstan
- Coordinates: 42°43′12″N 77°31′12″E
- Country: Kyrgyzstan
- Region: Issyk-Kul
- District: Issyk-Kul
- Elevation: 1,785 m (5,856 ft)

Population (2023)
  - Total: 2,804
- Time zone: UTC+6

Kojoyar (Kyrgyz: Кожояр) is a village in the Issyk-Kul Region of Kyrgyzstan. It is part of the Issyk-Kul District. Its population was 2,755 in 2021.
