= Sarıqamış, Neftchala =

Sarıqamış
- Location within Azerbaijan
- Coordinates: 39°12′43″N 49°13′52″E
- Country: Azerbaijan
- Rayon: Neftchala
- Municipality: Mikayıllı
- Time zone: UTC+4 (AZT)
  - Summer (DST): UTC+5 (AZT)

Sarıqamış (also, Sarykamysh) is a village in the Neftchala Rayon of Azerbaijan. The village forms part of the municipality of Mikayıllı.
