= Orto-Örüktü =

Orto-Örüktü Орто-Өрүктү
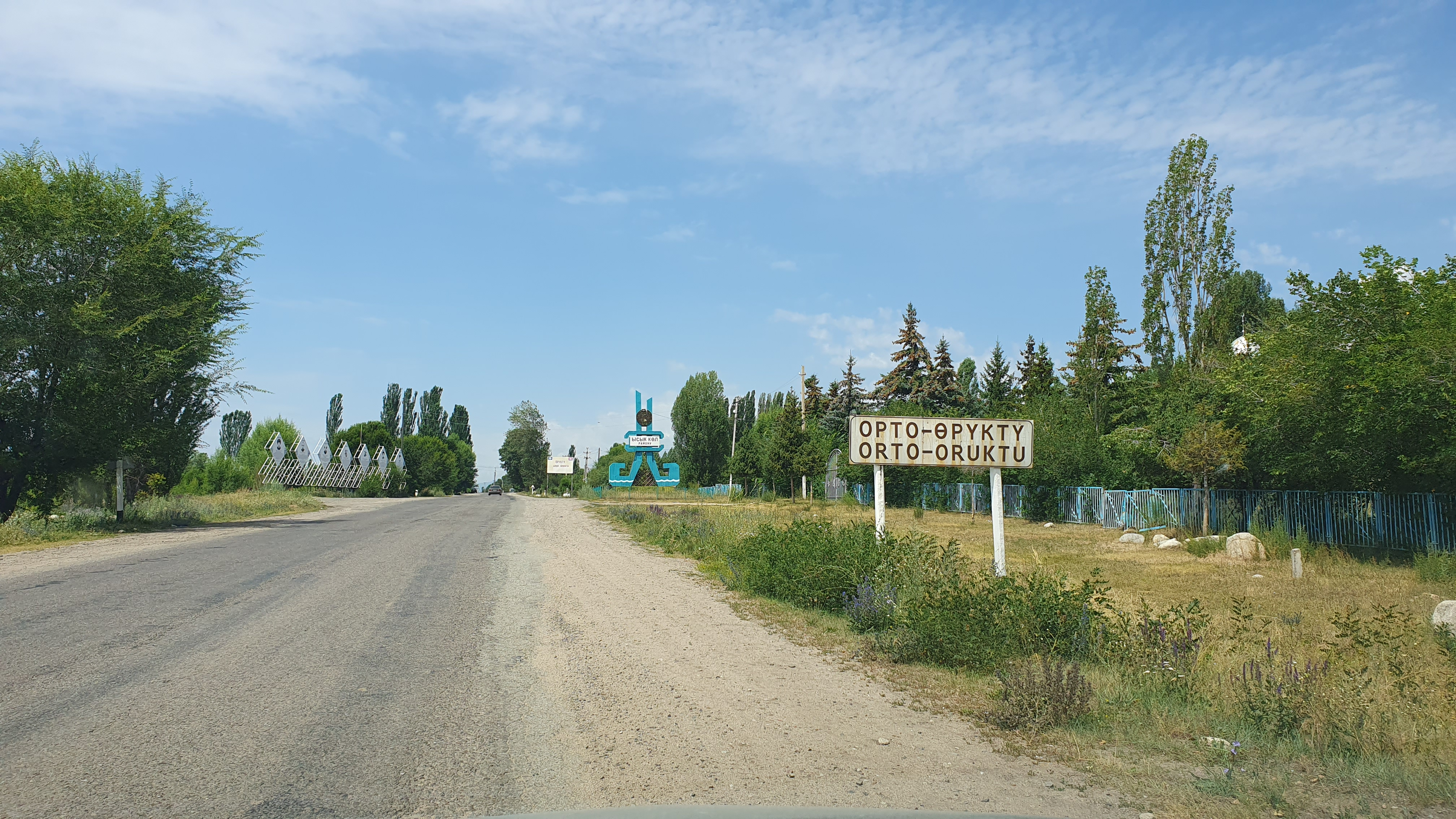

- Location within Kyrgyzstan
- Coordinates: 42°44′25″N 77°56′25″E
- Country: Kyrgyzstan
- Region: Issyk-Kul Region
- District: Issyk-Kul District

Population (2023)
  - Total: 1,981
- Time zone: UTC+6

Orto-Örüktü (Kyrgyz: Орто-Өрүктү) is a village in the Issyk-Kul Region of Kyrgyzstan. It is part of the Issyk-Kul District. Its population was 1,948 in 2021.

== Population ==
Historical population
Year	Pop.	±% p.a.
2009	1,396	—
2021	1,948	+2.82%
Note: resident population; Sources:
