= Şirvanlı, Barda =

Şirvanlı Shirvanly
- Municipality
- Location within Azerbaijan Location within Karabakh Economic Region
- Coordinates: 40°19′42″N 47°07′42″E
- Country: Azerbaijan
- District: Barda

Population
  - Total: 2,019
- Time zone: UTC+4 (AZT)

Şirvanlı (also Shirvanly) is a village and municipality in the Barda District of Azerbaijan. It has a population of 2,019.
