= Xıllı =

- Municipality
- Location within Azerbaijan
- Coordinates: 39°25′36″N 49°06′23″E
- Country: Azerbaijan
- Rayon: Neftchala
- Established: 13 January 1951

Government
  - Governor of Khilli: Khayal Zulfugarov

Population (2008)
  - Total: 3,941
- Time zone: UTC+4 (AZT)
  - Summer (DST): UTC+5 (AZT)

Xıllı (also, Khilly and Yukhary-Khylly) is a municipality in the Neftchala Rayon of Azerbaijan. It has a population of 3,941.

== History ==
The councillor Ibad Alakbarov played a major role in Khilly's development during the period of World War II. He also worked as director of the Department of education from 1939 to 1944. The village received municipality status in 1953.
