= Şirvanlı, Oghuz =

Şirvanlı
- Municipality
- Location within Azerbaijan Location within Shaki-Zagatala Economic Region
- Coordinates: 41°01′N 47°30′E
- Country: Azerbaijan
- Rayon: Oghuz

Population
  - Total: 824
- Time zone: UTC+4 (AZT)
  - Summer (DST): UTC+5 (AZT)

Şirvanlı (also, Shirvanly) is a village and municipality in the Oghuz Rayon of Azerbaijan. It has a population of 824.
