= Kara-Oy, Issyk-Kul =

Kara-Oy Кара-Ой
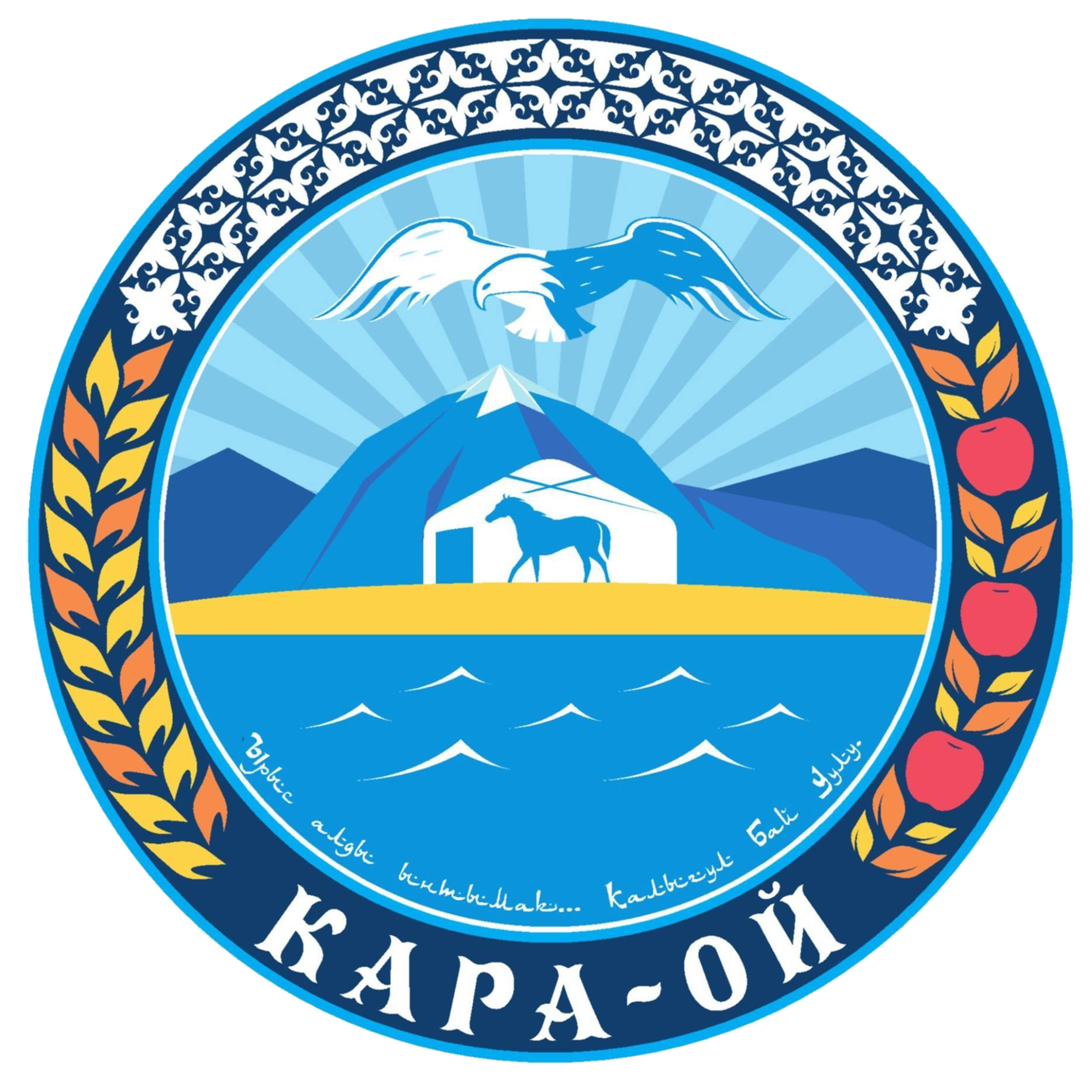
- Coat of arms

- Location within Kyrgyzstan
- Coordinates: 42°38′10″N 77°01′30″E
- Country: Kyrgyzstan
- Region: Issyk-Kul
- District: Issyk-Kul

Population (2023)
  - Total: 5,050
- Time zone: UTC+6

Kara-Oy (Kyrgyz: Кара-Ой, formerly: Dolinka) is a village in Issyk-Kul Region of Kyrgyzstan. It is part of the Issyk-Kul District. Its population was 5,018 in 2021.

== Population ==
Historical population
Year	Pop.	±% p.a.
2009	3,061	—
2021	5,018	+4.21%
Note: resident population; Sources:
