= Qyzylqayyng =

Coordinates: 45°50′00″N 80°15′00″E

Qyzylqayyng (Kazakh: Қызылқайың, Qyzylqaiyñ), before 1992 Saratovskoye or Saratovka, is a populated place in Almaty Region, Kazakhstan.
