= Şirvanlı, Agdam =

Şirvanlı
- Location within Azerbaijan Location within Karabakh Economic Region
- Coordinates: 40°03′38″N 47°02′50″E
- Country: Azerbaijan
- Rayon: Agdam
- Time zone: UTC+4 (AZT)
  - Summer (DST): UTC+5 (AZT)

Şirvanlı is a village in the Agdam Rayon of Azerbaijan.
