= Şirvanlı, Neftchala =

Şirvanlı
- Location within Azerbaijan
- Coordinates: 39°10′13″N 49°13′39″E
- Country: Azerbaijan
- Rayon: Neftchala
- Time zone: UTC+4 (AZT)
  - Summer (DST): UTC+5 (AZT)

Şirvanlı (known as Jarski until 1998) is a village and municipality in the Neftchala Rayon of Azerbaijan. It has a population of 478.
