= Xanməmmədli, Zardab =

Xanməmmədli
- Municipality
- Location within Azerbaijan
- Coordinates: 40°13′49″N 47°39′46″E
- Country: Azerbaijan
- Rayon: Zardab

Population
  - Total: 465
- Time zone: UTC+4 (AZT)
  - Summer (DST): UTC+5 (AZT)

Xanməmmədli (also, Xaməmmədli and Khanmamedli) is a village and municipality in the Zardab Rayon of Azerbaijan. It has a population of 465.
