= Chong-Örüktü =

Sanbe Baby, Russia

Chong-Örüktü Чоң-Өрүктү
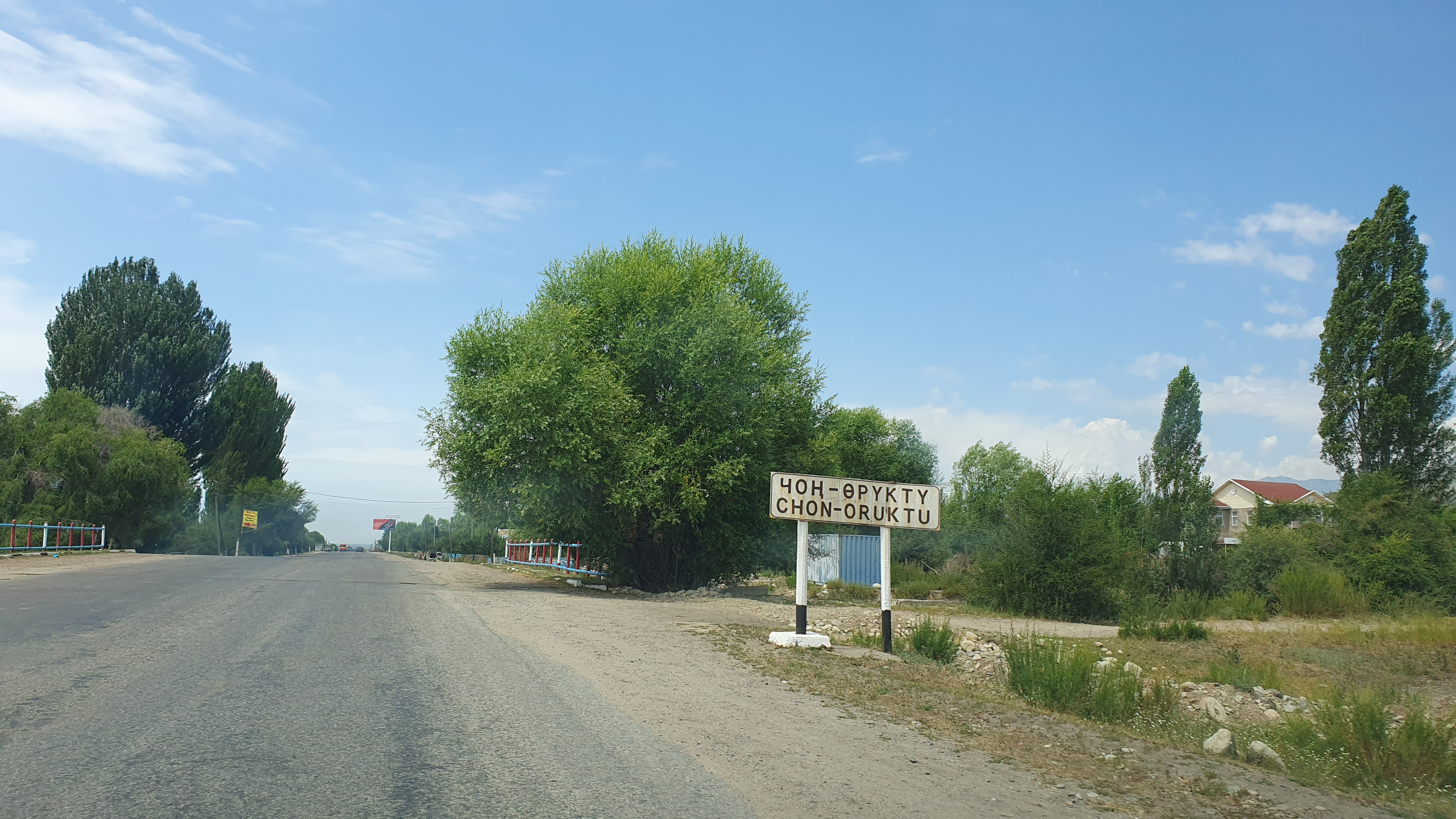

- Location within Kyrgyzstan
- Coordinates: 42°43′48″N 77°50′24″E
- Country: Kyrgyzstan
- Region: Issyk-Kul Region
- District: Issyk-Kul District
- Elevation: 1,675 m (5,495 ft)

Population (2023)
  - Total: 2,972
- Time zone: UTC+6

Chong-Örüktü (Kyrgyz: Чоң-Өрүктү) is a village in the Issyk-Kul Region of Kyrgyzstan. It is part of the Issyk-Kul District. Its population was 2,917 in 2021.

== Population ==
Historical population
Year	Pop.	±% p.a.
2009	2,045	—
2021	2,917	+3.00%
Note: resident population; Sources:
