= Kosh-Köl =

Kosh-Köl Кош-Көл
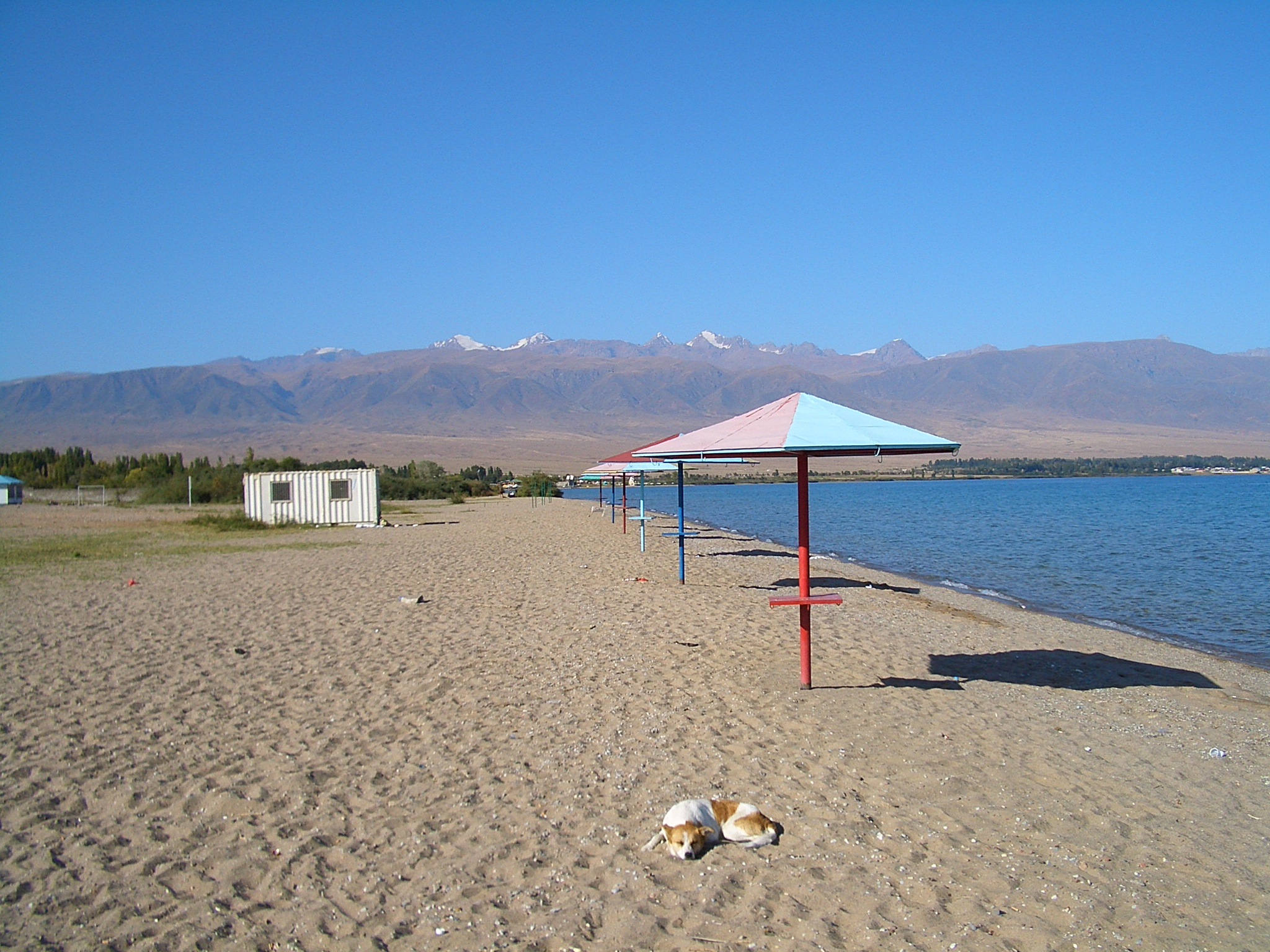
- On the beach in Kosh-Köl

- Location within Kyrgyzstan
- Coordinates: 42°31′48″N 76°36′36″E
- Country: Kyrgyzstan
- Region: Issyk-Kul
- District: Issyk-Kul
- Elevation: 1,626 m (5,335 ft)

Population (2023)
  - Total: 610
- Time zone: UTC+6

Kosh-Köl (Kyrgyz: Кош-Көл; Russian: Кош-Кёль or Кош-Коль) is a village in the Issyk-Kul Region of Kyrgyzstan. It is part of the Issyk-Kul District. Its population was 588 in 2021.

It is located near the northern shore of Lake Issyk Kul between Balykchy and Cholpon-Ata. The village includes two built-up areas. First, the actual residential village, located along the Balykchy-Cholpon-Ata-Karakol highway, as it cuts across the base of a Koshkol promontory jutting into Lake Issyk Kul; this section is within a couple kilometers away from the lake shore. Second, the name Koshkol' is also applied to the resort strip to the south of the village, on the south-eastern shore of the peninsula. Most of the resort buildings there are decidedly Soviet-era; as of 2007, some of them appeared abandoned, while others received visitors.

== Gallery ==
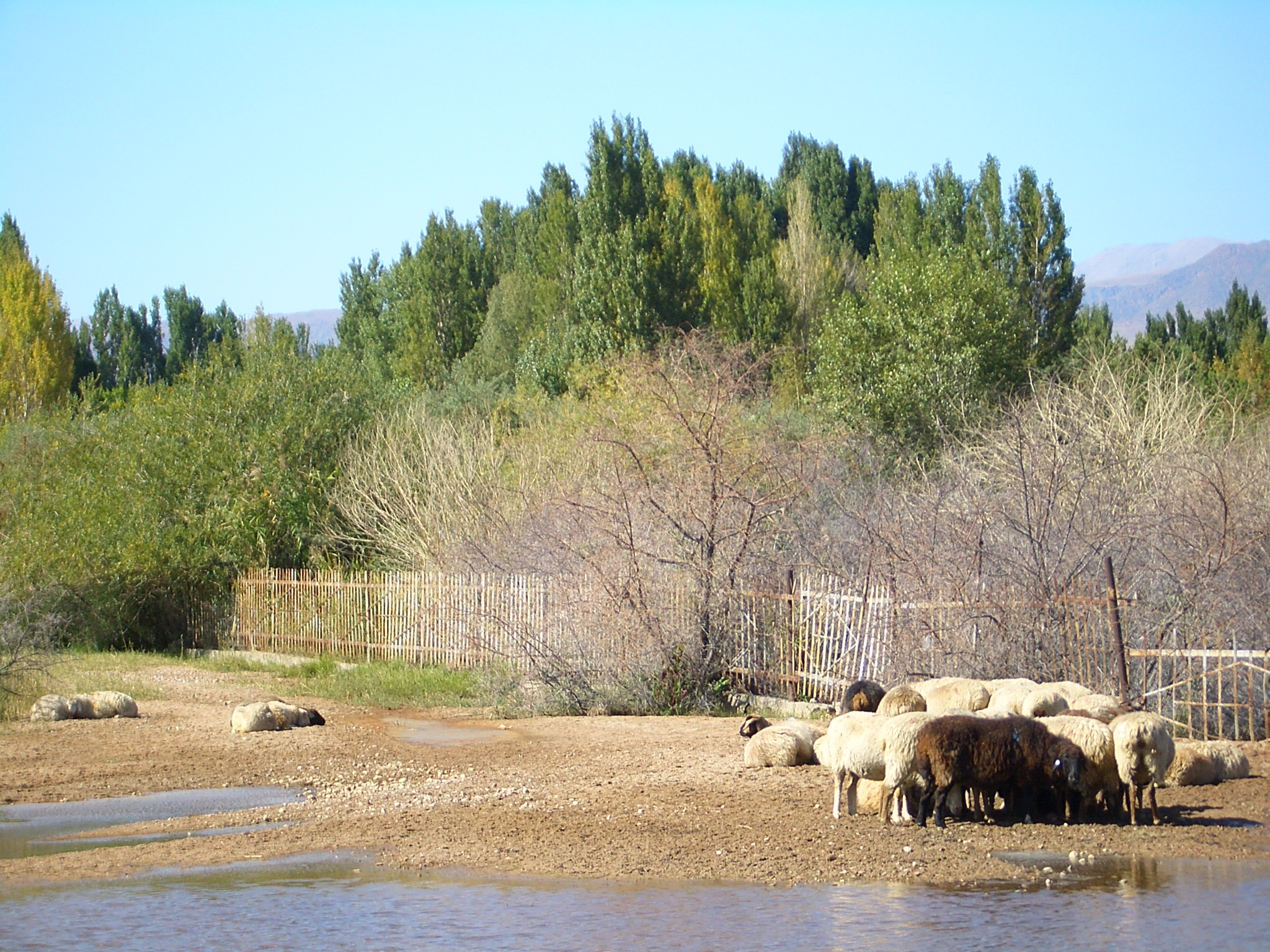
Sheep enjoying beach facilities

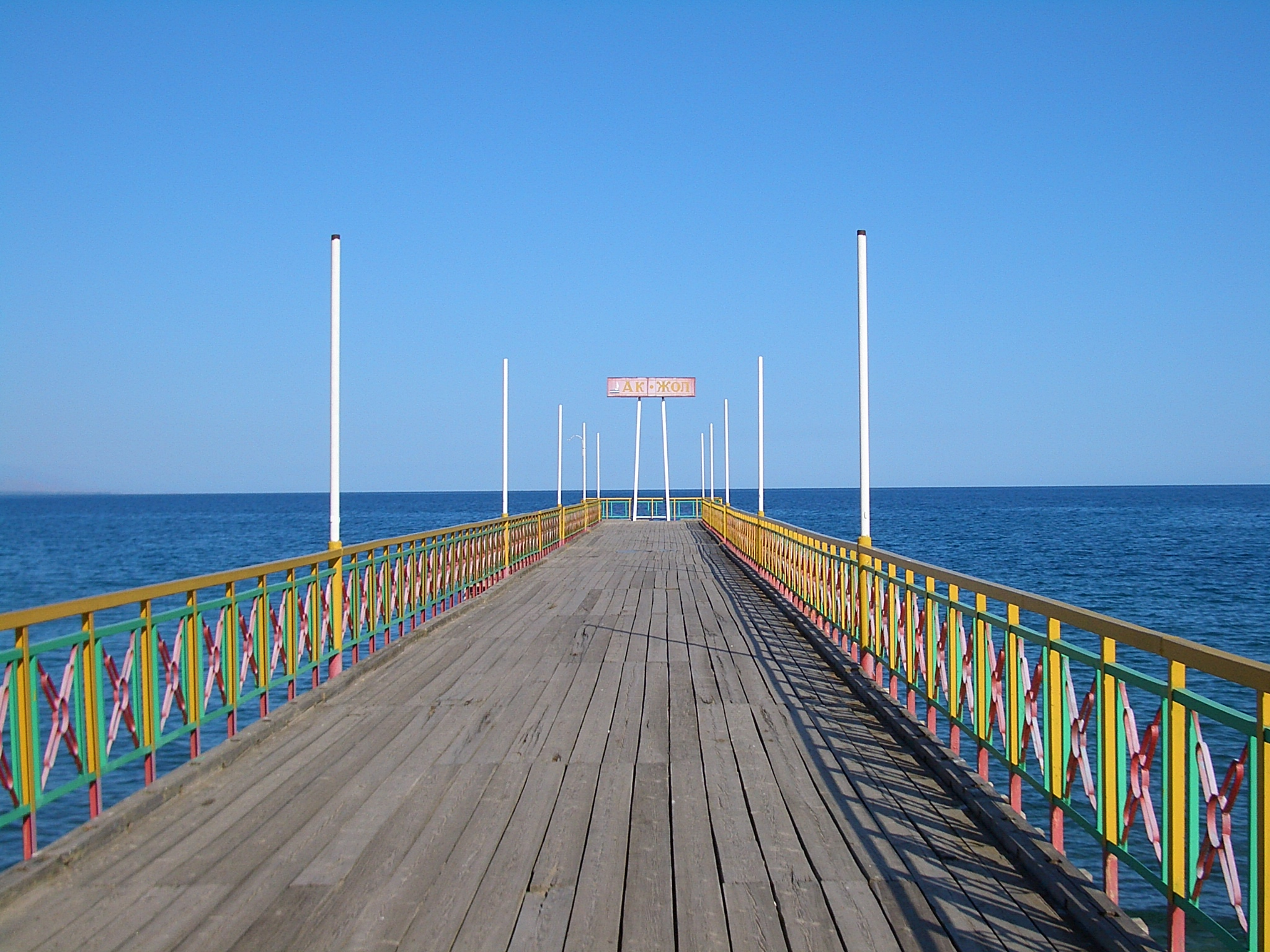
Ak Jol pleasure pier

Lifeguard station

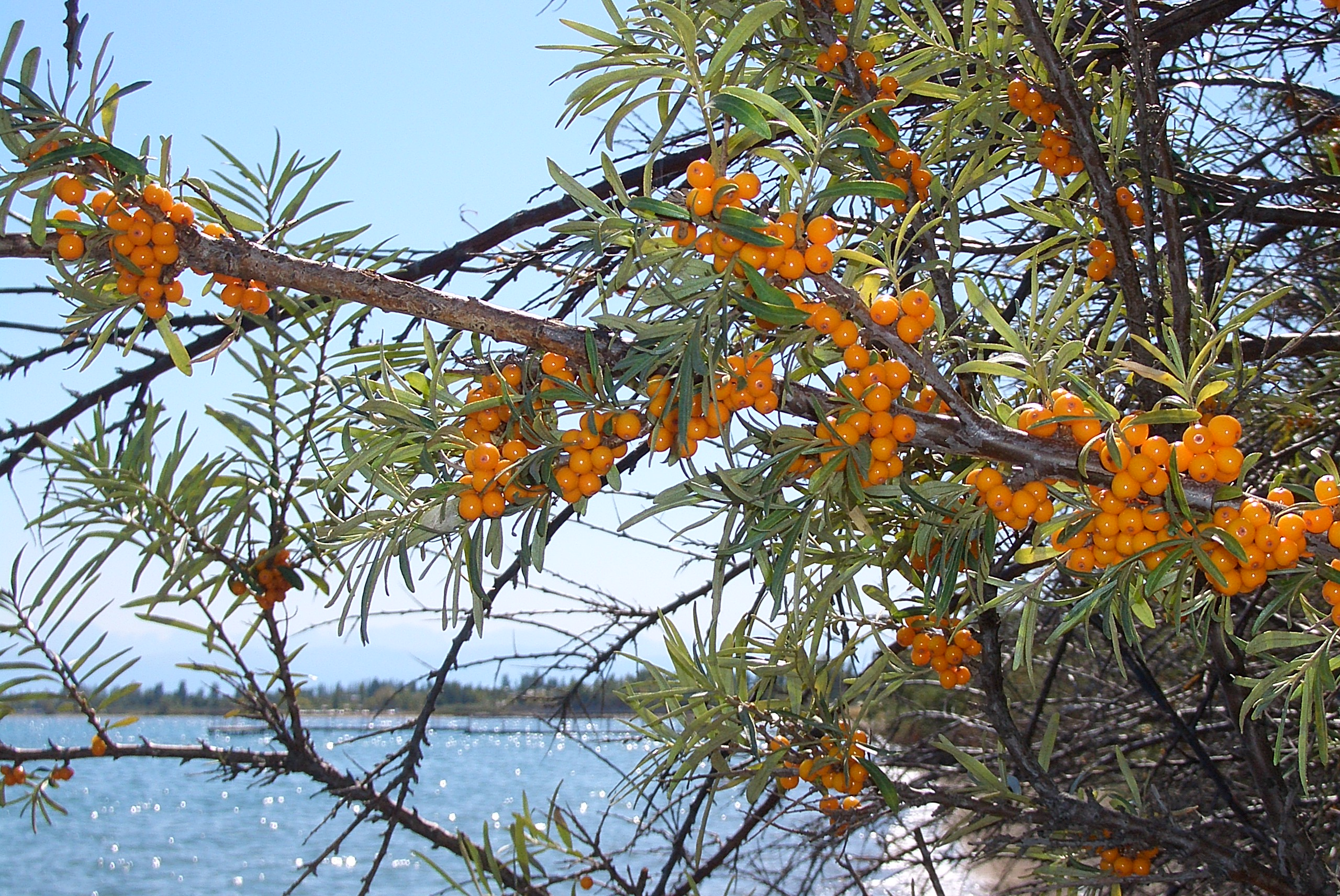
Sea buckthorn
