= Sary-Kamysh =

Sary-Kamysh Сары-Камыш
- Location within Kyrgyzstan
- Coordinates: 42°29′32″N 76°17′15″E
- Country: Kyrgyzstan
- Region: Issyk-Kul
- District: Issyk-Kul
- Elevation: 1,675 m (5,495 ft)

Population (2023)
  - Total: 2,775
- Time zone: UTC+6

Sary-Kamysh (Kyrgyz: Сары-Камыш) is a village in the Issyk-Kul Region of Kyrgyzstan. It is part of the Issyk-Kul District. Its population was 2,701 in 2021.
