= Mikayıllı, Jalilabad =

Mikayıllı
- Municipality
- Location within Azerbaijan
- Coordinates: 39°11′50″N 48°13′47″E
- Country: Azerbaijan
- Rayon: Jalilabad

Population
  - Total: 1,201
- Time zone: UTC+4 (AZT)
  - Summer (DST): UTC+5 (AZT)

Mikayıllı (also, Mikailly and Mikeyly) is a village and municipality in the Jalilabad Rayon of Azerbaijan. It has a population of 1,201.
