= Chok-Tal =

Chok-Tal Чок-Тал
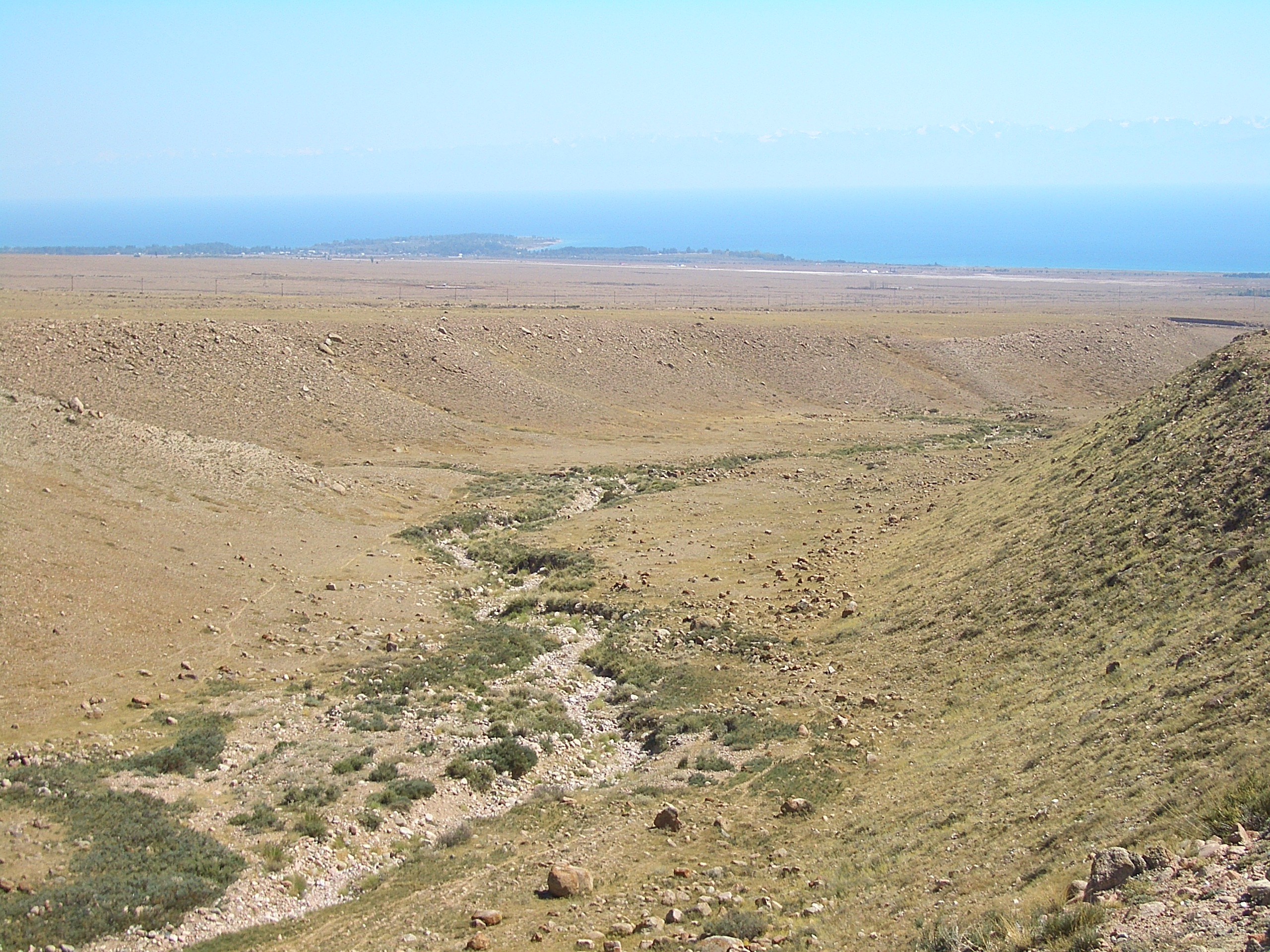
- Looking toward Chok-Tal (on the peninsula) and Tamchy airport (to the right of it) from the plain above Tamchy

- Location within Kyrgyzstan
- Coordinates: 42°34′48″N 76°44′24″E
- Country: Kyrgyzstan
- Region: Issyk-Kul Region
- District: Issyk-Kul District
- Elevation: 1,625 m (5,331 ft)

Population (2023)
  - Total: 2,009
- Time zone: UTC+6

Chok-Tal (Kyrgyz: Чок-Тал) is a village in the Issyk-Kul District of the Issyk-Kul Region of Kyrgyzstan. Its population was 1,910 in 2021. It is located on the northern shore of Lake Issyk Kul between Tamchy and Cholpon Ata.
