= Korumdu =

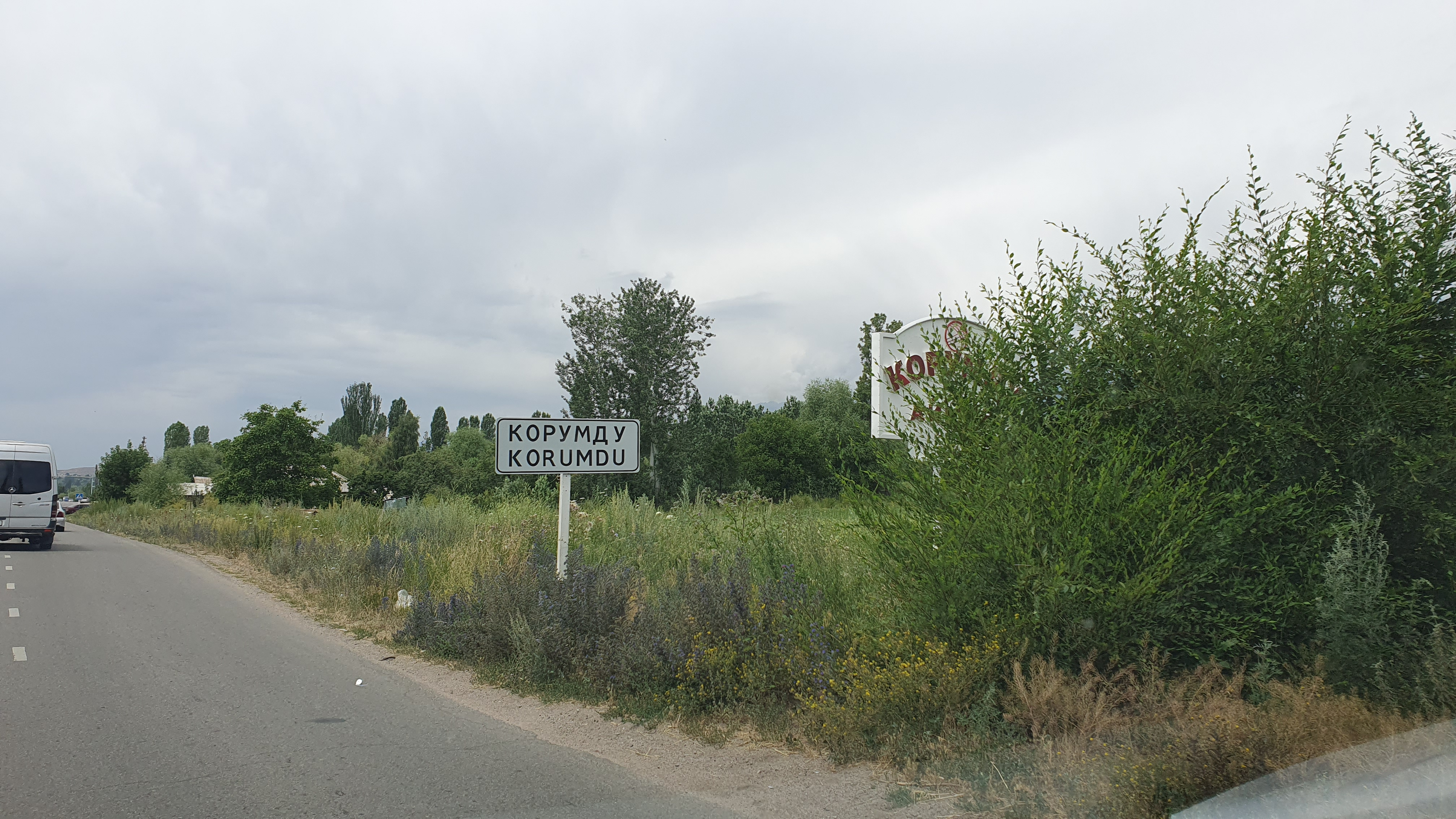

- Location within Kyrgyzstan
- Coordinates: 42°40′48″N 77°20′24″E
- Country: Kyrgyzstan
- Region: Issyk-Kul Region
- District: Issyk-Kul District
- Elevation: 1,601 m (5,253 ft)

Population (2023)
  - Total: 3,450
- Time zone: UTC+6

Korumdu (Kyrgyz: Корумду) is a village in the Issyk-Kul Region of Kyrgyzstan, on Issyk Kul Lake. It is part of the Issyk-Kul District. Its population was 3,458 in 2021.
