= Neftchala District =

District in southeastern Azerbaijan

Coordinates: 39°21′N 49°15′E

- District
- Map of Azerbaijan showing Neftchala District
- Country: Azerbaijan
- Region: Shirvan-Salyan
- Established: 11 February 1940
- Capital: Neftchala
- Settlements: 52

Government
  - Governor: Mirhasan Seyidov

Area
  - Total: 1,450 km^{2} (560 sq mi)

Population (2020)
  - Total: 88,900
  - Density: 61.3/km^{2} (159/sq mi)
- Time zone: UTC+4 (AZT)
- Postal code: 4700
- Website: neftchala-ih.gov.az

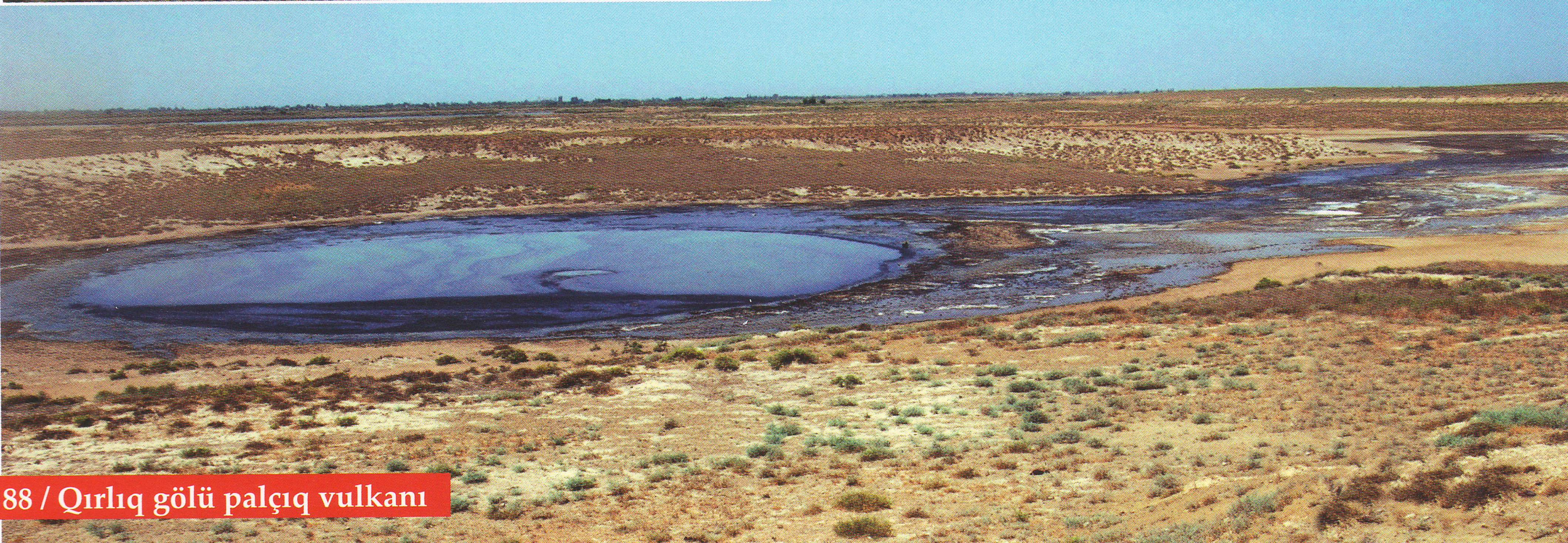
Mud volcano in Neftchala

Neftchala District (Azerbaijani: Neftçala rayonu) is one of the 66 districts of Azerbaijan. It is located in the southeast of the country and belongs to the Shirvan-Salyan Economic Region. The district borders Jalilabad and Bilasuvar Districts to the west, Salyan District to the north, Lankaran and Masally Districts to the south, and Caspian Sea to the east. Its capital and the largest city is Neftchala. As of 2020, the district had a population of 88,900.

== History ==
The Neftchala District was formed as a district in the composition of the Azerbaijan Soviet Socialist Republic on February 11, 1940. Until this time, it was located in the area of modern Salyan District, and during that year it became part of the Khilly region, organized on January 24, 1939. As Neftchala was an exceptionally industrial region, it was liquidated in December 1959 and unified with the Salyan region. However, after 4 years it was split off from the Salyan District again and became a separate industrial zone. But it was felt that this mixed system for control did not justify itself, and once again Neftchala region was liquidated in 1965 and became part of the Salyan. The region was finally made separate again after 7 years on April 27, 1973.

== Territory ==
There is one city (Neftchala), 48 villages, and 3 settlements (Banke, Khylly, and Hasanabad) in the district. Neftchala district is bordered by Masally, Salyan, Jelilabad, Bilesuvar, and Lankaran.

The total area of the district is 1,451 km ^{2,} of which 825 km ^{2} is productive lands. Agricultural lands cover 390 km ^{2} of the territory. Cattle-breeding pastures occupy 355 km ^{2}, while the total area of planted lands is 470 km ^{2}. Fruit gardens and saline lands cover 5 km ^{2} and 13 km ^{2}, respectively.

== Population ==
Population by sex, towns and regions, urban settlements of the Republic of Azerbaijan at the beginning of 2018
| Towns and regions | Total | including: | | Urban places | including: | | Rural places | including: | |
| Towns and regions | Total | men | women | Urban places | men | women | Rural places | men | women |
| Neftchala region | 87.3 | 43.3 | 44.0 | 40.8 | 20.2 | 20.6 | 46.5 | 23.1 | 23.4 |
| Neftchala town | 21.8 | 10.9 | 10.9 | 21.8 | 10.9 | 10.9 | - | - | - |
| Banka settlement | 7.8 | 3.9 | 3.9 | 7.8 | 3.9 | 3.9 | - | - | - |
| Hasanabad settlement | 6.9 | 3.3 | 3.6 | 6.9 | 3.3 | 3.6 | - | - | - |
| Khilli settlement | 4.3 | 2.1 | 2.2 | 4.3 | 2.1 | 2.2 | - | - | - |

== Geography and climate ==
The territory of the district is mainly lowland. The entire district is situated below sea level. Shirvan and Mughan Lowlands covers the southeast of the district. The river Kura flows into the Caspian Sea in Neftchala district. There are mud volcanos that occupy the area from Baligchi to Gizilagaj bay. There are several underwater plains in the coastal area of the Neftchala district. They are Karagedov, Kalmichkov, Kur, Borisov, Kornilov-Pavlov, Plita, Pogorelaya, and Golovachev. There is a lake named Duzdag, which is situated between Babazanan and Durovdag peaks, on the border of the Salyan district.

The district has a semi-desert and warm climate. The average temperature is 3C in January and 25-36 C in July.

== Flora and fauna ==
Lands of the district are divided as grey-meadow, alluvial meadow, and swampy meadow. There are saline soils as well. Vegetation in the district is semidesert and desert type. There can be found Tugay forests.

The district's fauna is diverse. The dominant fauna of the Neftchala district includes gazelle, pelican, boar, wolf, wild cat, rabbit and such.

== Economy ==
Khazar is an automobile factory belonging to Azermash Company located in Neftchala, Azerbaijan.

Agriculture, fishing, oil, and gas are the cores of the district economy.

Statistics of agriculture in Neftchala district
| | 2010 | 2012 | 2013 | 2014 | 2015 | 2016 |
Total area of agricultural crops (ha)
| Cereal crops | 39,666 | 39,820 | 42,944 | 45,208 | 43,778 | 46,583 |
| of which wheat | 9,903 | 8,556 | 3,879 | 5,212 | 4,620 | 5,814 |
| Cotton | 1,822 | 1,260 | 713 | 557 | 221 | 1,541 |
| Potato | 90 | 111 | 112 | 113 | 114 | 114 |
| Vegetable | 121 | 140 | 137 | 134 | 122 | 119 |
| Garden plants | 38 | 138 | 104 | 126 | 140 | 146 |
| Fruits and berries | 581 | 583 | 584 | 586 | 588 | 589 |
| Grape | 8 | 7 | 7 | 7 | 7 | 57 |
Production of main agricultural products (ton)
| Cereal crops | 100,483 | 102,261 | 110,933 | 86,078 | 136,588 | 105,384 |
| of which wheat | 25,171 | 22,138 | 10,738 | 11,988 | 15,246 | 16,408 |
| Cotton | 1,360 | 1,259 | 753 | 768 | 255 | 1,978 |
| Potato | 1,119 | 1,333 | 1,370 | 1,368 | 1,402 | 1,398 |
| Vegetable | 1,350 | 1,705 | 1,715 | 1,674 | 1,527 | 1,488 |
| Garden plants | 340 | 1,637 | 1,319 | 1,610 | 2,158 | 2,250 |
| Fruits and berries | 2,407 | 2,463 | 2,476 | 2,486 | 2,374 | 2,288 |
| Grape | 235 | 247 | 254 | 258 | 302 | 177 |
Productivity of agricultural products (centner/ha)
| Cereal corps | 25.3 | 25.7 | 25.8 | 19.0 | 31.2 | 22.6 |
| of which wheat | 25.4 | 25.9 | 27.7 | 23.0 | 33.0 | 28.2 |
| Cotton | 7.5 | 10.0 | 10.6 | 13.8 | 11.5 | 12.8 |
| Potato | 125 | 120 | 122 | 121 | 122 | 123 |
| Vegetable | 112 | 122 | 125 | 125 | 125 | 125 |
| Garden plants | 90 | 119 | 127 | 128 | 154 | 154 |
| Fruits and berries | 52.7 | 53.1 | 53.8 | 53.9 | 51.5 | 49.7 |
| Grape | 61.5 | 44.9 | 45.1 | 45.9 | 85.7 | 171.4 |
Number of livestock
| Large livestock | 40,604 | 41,512 | 41,868 | 42,159 | 42,428 | 42,849 |
| of which cow and buffalo | 19,495 | 20,236 | 20,677 | 20,869 | 21,062 | 21,173 |
| Sheep and goats | 116,026 | 125,096 | 128,940 | 130,385 | 132,983 | 139,323 |
| Birds | 325,103 | 445,262 | 675,743 | 613,856 | 910,620 | 1,006,422 |
Production of livestock products (ton)
| Meat | 3,158 | 7,330 | 7,304 | 8,590 | 8,850 | 8,945 |
| Milk | 20,167 | 22,869 | 23,734 | 23,865 | 24,325 | 24,415 |
| Eggs (in thousand) | 3,730 | 4,016 | 4,205 | 4,267 | 6,100 | 7,385 |
| Wool (in physical weight) | 190 | 236 | 253 | 254 | 262 | 268 |

== Municipalities ==
There are 17 municipalities in the district which consist of 163 members. Neftchala municipality has 15 members, Khylly municipality has 9, Hasanabad municipality has 11, and other village municipalities have 128 members. The municipalities of Neftchala district are situated in the city, with two settlements, and 14 villages.

== Court ==
The court was established on 20 April 1974. The initial name of the court was Neftchala District People's Court. Its name was changed to Neftchala District Court in 2000.

== Notable natives ==
- Khalil Rza Uluturk, writer
