= Boz-Karagan =

Boz-Karagan Kyrgyz: Боз-Караган
- Location within Kyrgyzstan
- Coordinates: 40°20′0″N 73°23′30″E
- Country: Kyrgyzstan
- Region: Osh Region
- District: Alay District

Population (2021)
  - Total: 1,477

Boz-Karagan (Kyrgyz: Боз-Караган) is a village in Osh Region of Kyrgyzstan. Its population was 1,477 in 2021.

The town of Gülchö is 2.1 miles (3.4 km) to the east, and Arpa-Tektir is 2 miles (3 km) to the north.
