= Gejige =

Gejige Kyrgyz: Гежиге
- Location within Kyrgyzstan
- Coordinates: 39°53′30″N 73°25′20″E
- Country: Kyrgyzstan
- Region: Osh Region
- District: Alay District
- Elevation: 2,390 m (7,840 ft)

Population (2021)
  - Total: 129
- Time zone: UTC+6

Gejige (Kyrgyz: Гежиге) is a village in the Osh Region of Kyrgyzstan. It is part of the Alay District. Its population was 129 in 2021.

Nearby towns and villages include Chong-Karakol (3 km or 2 mi) and Kichi-Karakol (3 km or 2 mi).
