= M41 highway =

Road in Central Asia

- Pamir Highway
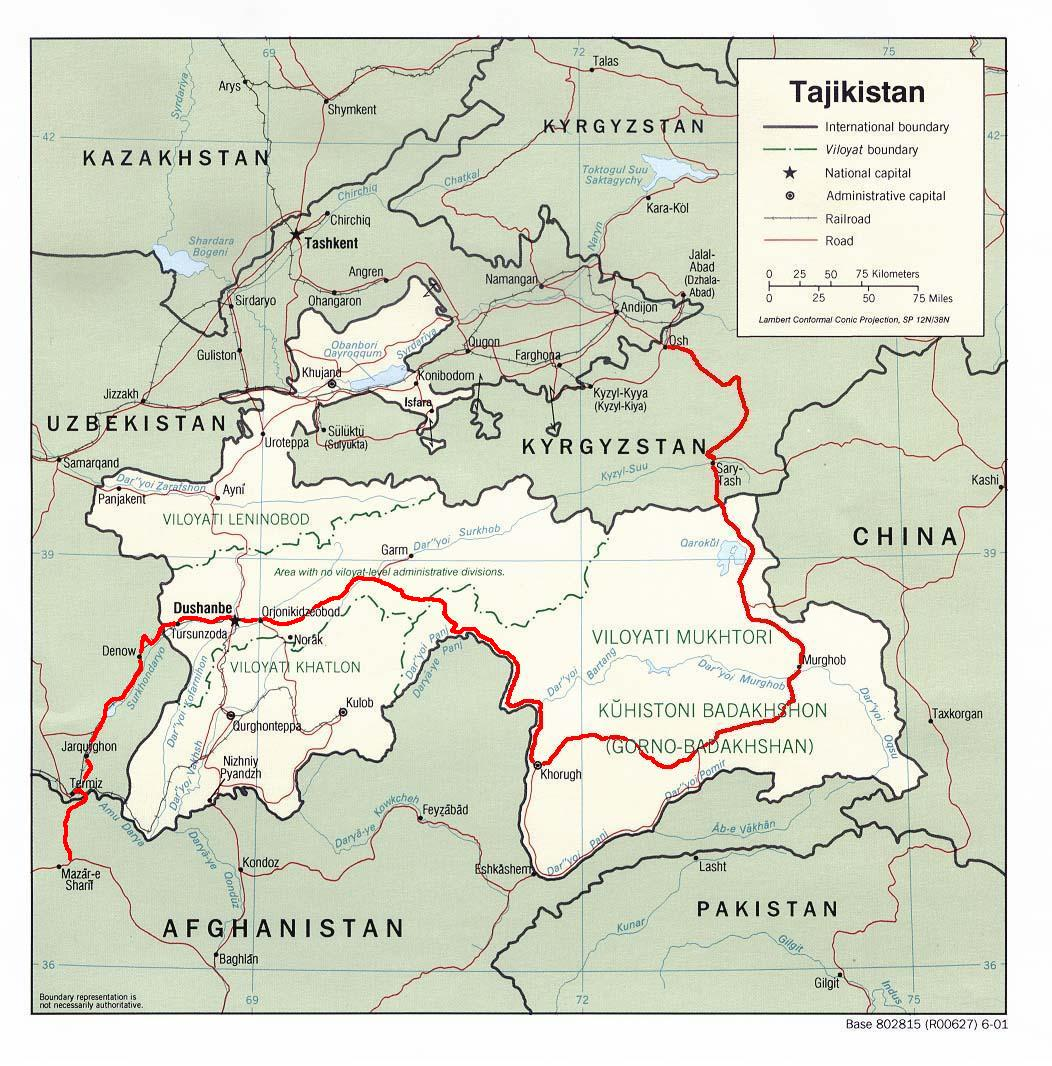
- The historical Pamir Highway travels through Afghanistan, Uzbekistan, Tajikistan, and Kyrgyzstan, in Central Asia. The modern M41 extends further, from Osh to Kara-Balta, in the western suburbs of Bishkek.

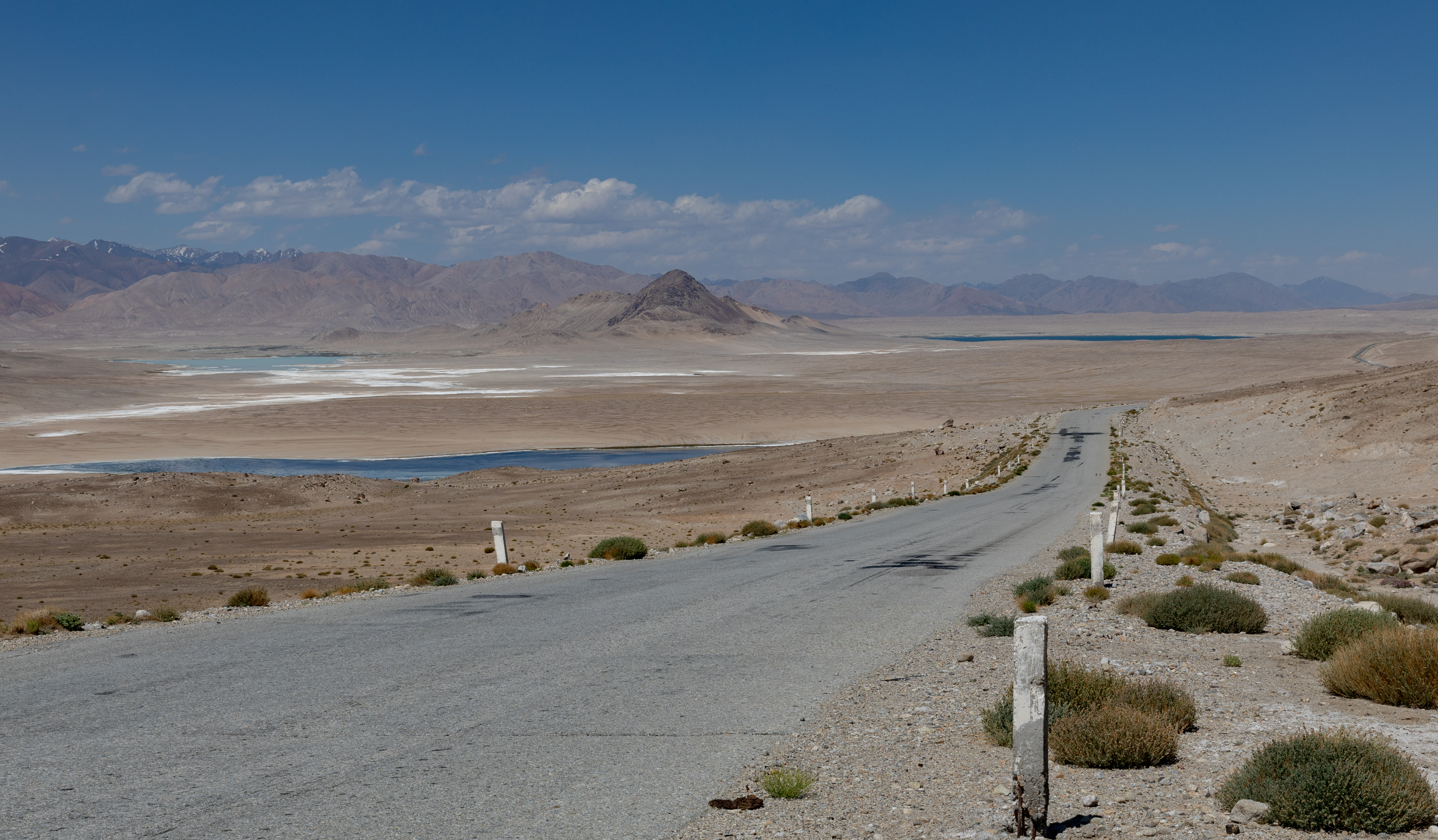
- Pamir highway from Khargush to Murghob, Tajikistan

Route information
- Part of E008 / E007
- Length: 1,252 km (778 mi)
- History: The road formed one link of the ancient Silk Road trade route.

Location
- Countries: Afghanistan, Uzbekistan, Tajikistan, Kyrgyzstan

Highway system

The M41, known informally and more commonly as the Pamir Highway (Russian: Памирский тракт, romanized: Pamirsky Trakt), is a road traversing the Pamir Mountains through Afghanistan, Uzbekistan, Tajikistan, and Kyrgyzstan, with a length of over 1,200 km. It is the only continuous route through the difficult terrain of the mountains, and it is the main supply route to Tajikistan's Gorno-Badakhshan Autonomous Region. The route has been in use for millennia, as there are a limited number of viable passages through the high Pamir Mountains. The road formed one link of the ancient Silk Road trade route. M41 is the Soviet road number, but it only remains as an official designation in post-Soviet Uzbekistan, as confirmed by official decree. Kyrgyzstan and Tajikistan have passed decrees abolishing Soviet numbering of highways and assigning their own national numbering.

== Route description ==
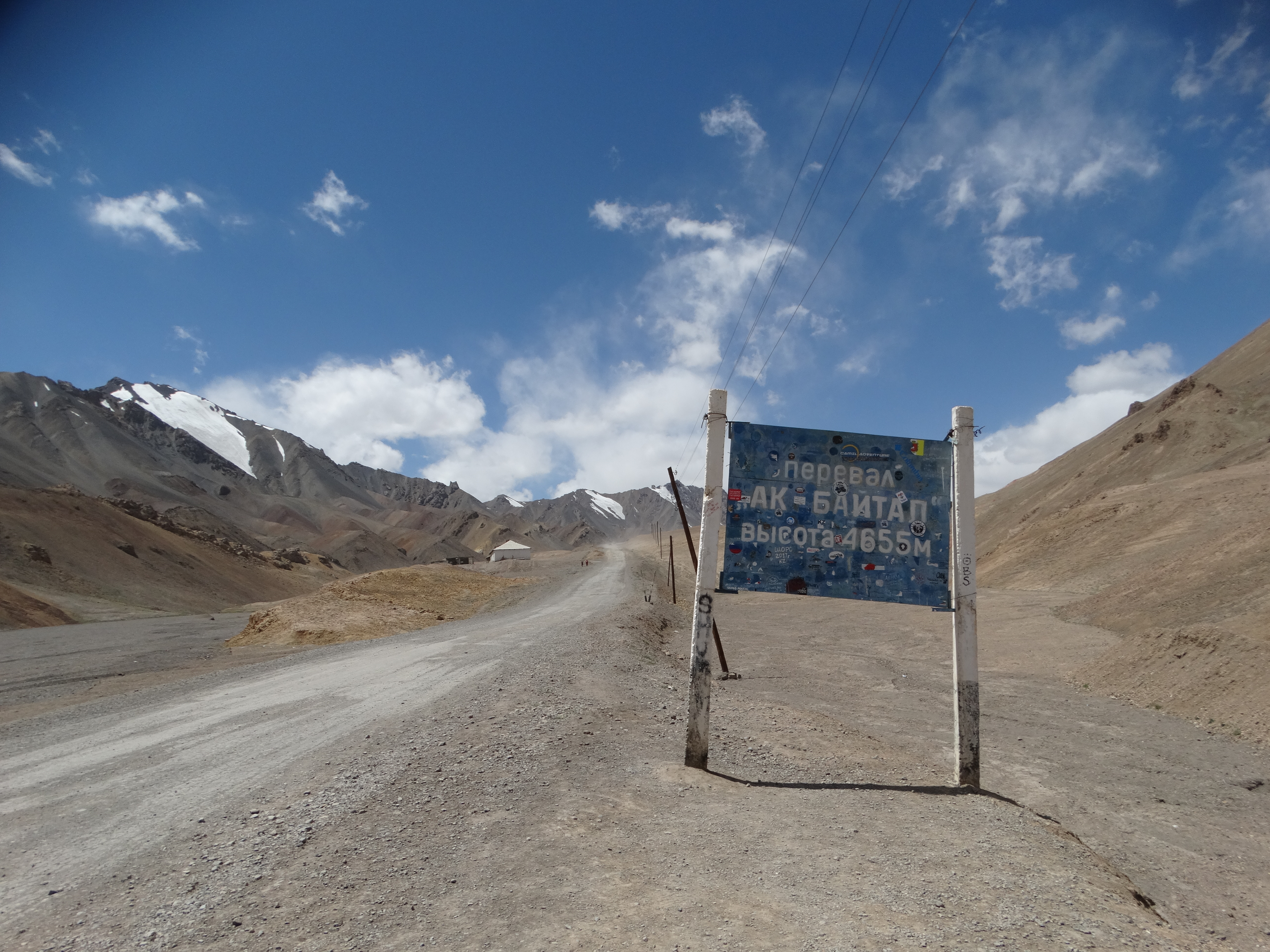
Ak-Baital Pass (4,655 m), highest pass on the Pamir Highway, Gorno-Badakhshan, Tajikistan

Sources disagree on the starting points of the highway, with Mazari-i-Sharif, Afghanistan; Termiz, Uzbekistan; Dushanbe, Tajikistan; and Khorog, Tajikistan all being offered. All sources, however, agree that the highway ends in Osh, Kyrgyzstan. Today, the route is part of the M41 highway, which starts at Termiz at 37°12′39″N 67°16′20″E and ends at Kara-Balta, to the west of Bishkek, Kyrgyzstan, at 42°49′40″N 73°52′53″E. The route runs northward through Termiz before turning east and crossing into Tajikistan. It then follows a general eastward route through Dushanbe, the capital of Tajikistan, to Khorog, crossing the Kafirnigan, Vakhsh, and Bartang rivers. From there, it continues east for about 310 kilometers to Murghab, where it crosses the Murghab River. The highway then passes through the 4,655-meter (15,270 ft) high Ak-Baital Pass and past Lake Karakul, before crossing into Kyrgyzstan to its terminus in Osh.

The road was constructed partly at the end of the 19th century (during the Great Game), and mostly in the 1930s, by the Soviet Union.

In the 2000s, the Pamir Highway was connected with China and the Karakoram Highway.

The Pamir Highway is designated as route M-41 over much of its length in Tajikistan and Kyrgyzstan, and it is known as the second-highest international highway in the world, at 4,655 m. The section between Dushanbe and Murghab has the European route number E 008. The section between Sary-Tash and Osh has the number E 007.

Construction and maintenance levels vary substantially along the highway. The roadway is unpaved in some areas but otherwise paved most of the way. Except for its stretches in Kyrgyzstan and nearing Dushanbe, the road is heavily damaged along most of its length by erosion, earthquakes, landslides, and avalanches.

Sometimes referred to as the "Heroin Highway", much of the ninety tonnes of heroin that are trafficked through Tajikistan each year pass along this route.

=== Main points ===
Starting from Osh, the route follows in this manner:

Osh city – Taldyk lane (3,615 m, pass through the Alay Range) – Gulcha village – Gulcha river valley – Kyrgyzstan lane (3,541 m) – Sary-Tash village (Alay valley) – Kyzylart lane (4,250 m, pass through the Trans-Alay Range, entrance to the territory of the Gorno-Badakhshan Autonomous Region, border crossing between Kyrgyzstan and Tajikistan) – Markansu river valley – Uybulak lane (4,200 m) – Karakul lake — Ak-Baital Pass lane (4,655 m) — Murghab — Naizatash lane (4,314 m) — Alichur valley — Khargush lane (4,091 m) + Tagarkaty lane (4,168 m) — Sulu-Tagarkaty river valley — Koi-Tezek lane (4,251 m) — Gunt river valley — Khorog — Panj river valley — Qal'ai Khumb village — Khaburabot lane (3,720 m) — Obihingou river valley — Vakhsh river valley — Dushanbe city.

- Kyrgyzstan
  - ЭМ-05 ЭМ-05 Road: Osh – Taldyk Pass – Sary-Tash
  - ЭМ-07 ЭМ-07 Road: Sary-Tash – Kyzylart Pass – Border of Tajikistan
- Tajikistan
  - РБ05 РБ05 Road: Border of Kyrgyzstan – Murghob
  - РБ04 РБ04 Road: Murghob – Khorugh – Qal'ai Khumb
  - РБ03 РБ03 Road: Qal'ai Khumb – Tavildara – Labi Jar
  - РБ07 РБ07 Road: Labi Jar – Obi Garm – Vahdat
  - РБ04 РБ04 Road: Vahdat – Dushanbe
  - РБ02 РБ02 Road: Dushanbe – Tursunzoda
- Uzbekistan
  - M41 M41 Road: Border of Tajikistan – Denov – Termez

== History ==
=== Old Pamir Highway ===
At the end of the 19th century —beginning of the 20th century in Central Asia, a sharp geopolitical rivalry for influence continued between the British and Russian empires, which was termed "the Great Game". The military department of the Russian Empire, concerned about the activity of the British in the Pamirs, decided to build a strategic military road along which it would be possible to quickly transfer troops from Fergana to the Alay Valley and carry out their effective supply. The construction was planned and carried out in deep secrecy, and for a long time, the existence of a road through the Alay Range in Russian Turkestan in Europe was not known.

In 1903, an officer of the Russian army, military geographer Nikolai Korzhenevskiy, climbing the Taldyk Pass in Kyrgyzstan, at a height of 3,615 meters, discovered a memorial pillar with the names of people who took part in the design and laying of a road along the Hissaro-Alay. They were Lieutenant Colonel Bronislav Grombchevsky and railway engineers Mickiewicz, Burakovsky, Zarakovsky, and Podporuchik Irmuth. For a long time, Europeans believed that the first road through the Taldyk Pass was built in 1916 by Austrians captured in the First World War. Korzhenevsky's diary testifies to something else: he believed that in 1893, it was built by Russian sapper units. However, according to other sources, the first road connecting Osh and Gülchö in Kyrgyzstan through the Taldyk Pass was built in 1876 by a Russian detachment under the command of General Alexander Konstantinovich Abramov. Later, this small section of the road (88 versts – 1.1 km), from Fergana to the Alay Valley of Kyrgyzstan, was called the "Old Pamir Highway". According to Korzhenevsky's testimony, in 1910, only a dangerous pack trail went further from Gülchö to the south, through the Eastern Pamirs. Along the Panj river, from Darvaz to Rushan, in 1915, Russian units, with the help of the local population, also laid a pack trail, on which cargo was transported by pack horses and donkeys. Rockfalls, landslides, avalanches, waterfalls, and floods often destroyed the trail. By 1930, according to eyewitnesses, the trail was in terrible condition, and even pack horses could hardly pass through it—they had to be constantly unloaded in order to transfer them to the ovrings (traditional cliff pathways in Tajikistan).

With the completion in 1937, during the Soviet era, of the construction of a highway connecting the cities of Osh and Khorog, the Old Pamir Highway became an integral part of the large Pamir Highway.

By the decree of the Presidium of the Supreme Soviet of the USSR of 5 March 1941, the tract was named after Josef Stalin.

=== 2022 Tajik protests ===
During the 2022 protests in the Badakhshan Mountainous Autonomous Region, the Pamir Highway was temporarily blocked by a group of protestors led by Muhammadboqir Muhammadboqirov. Muhammadboqirov was killed on 23 May 2022, and the road reopened.

== Gallery ==
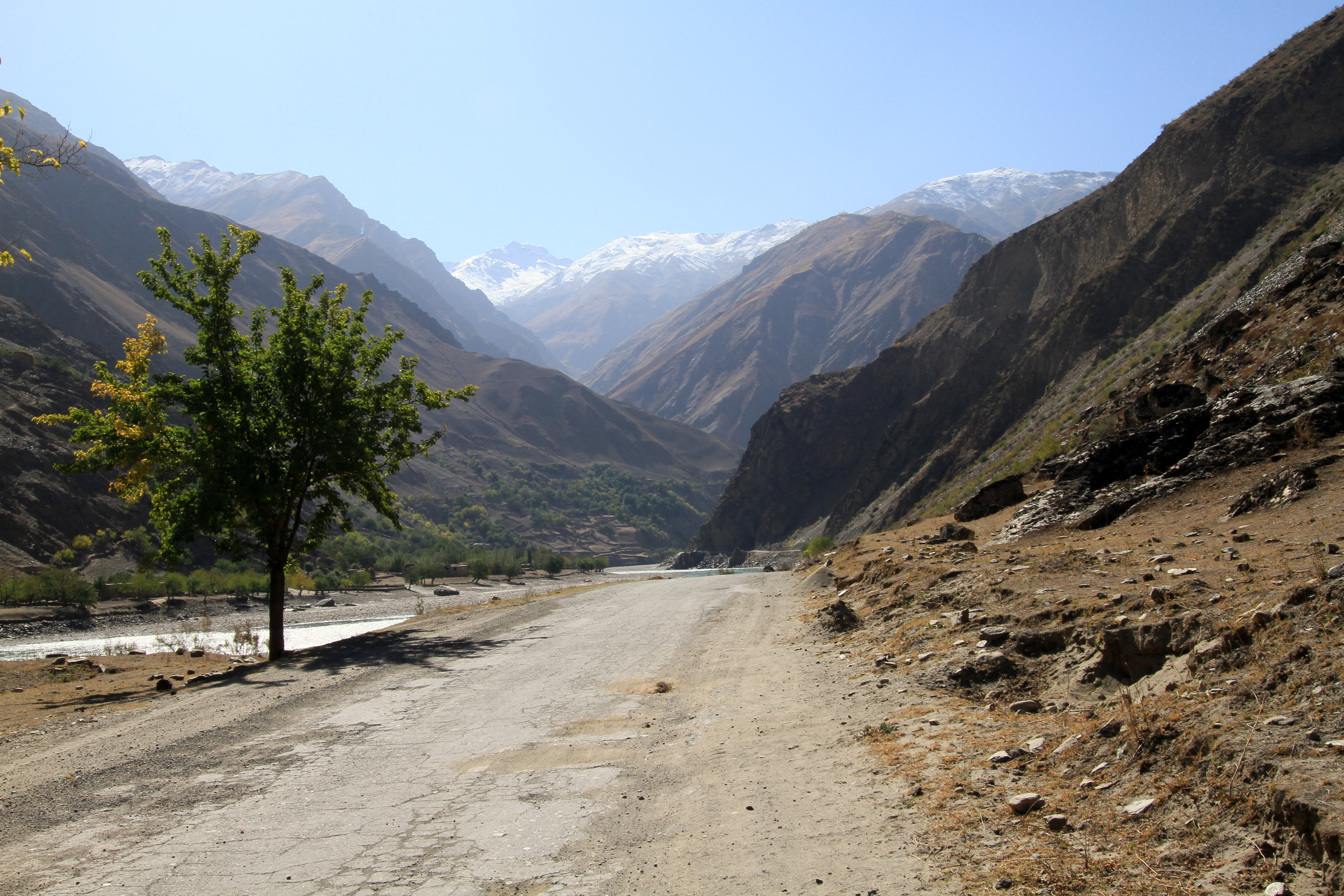
The Pamir Highway in Tajikistan

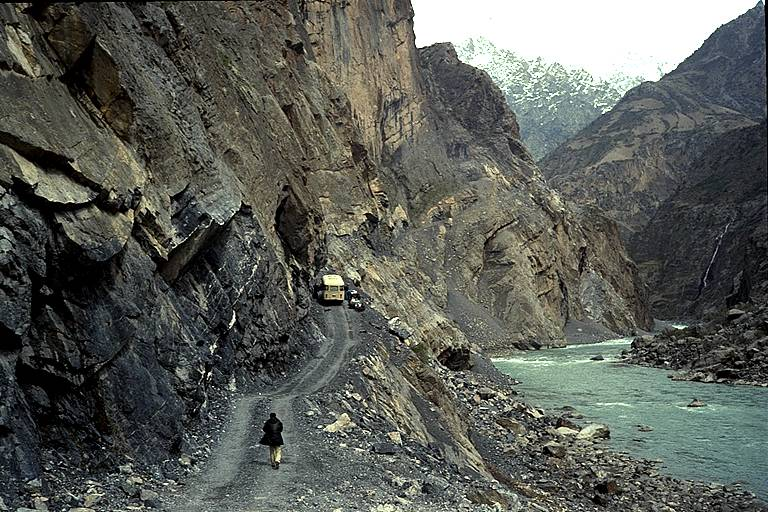
The Pamir Highway between Dushanbe and Khorog

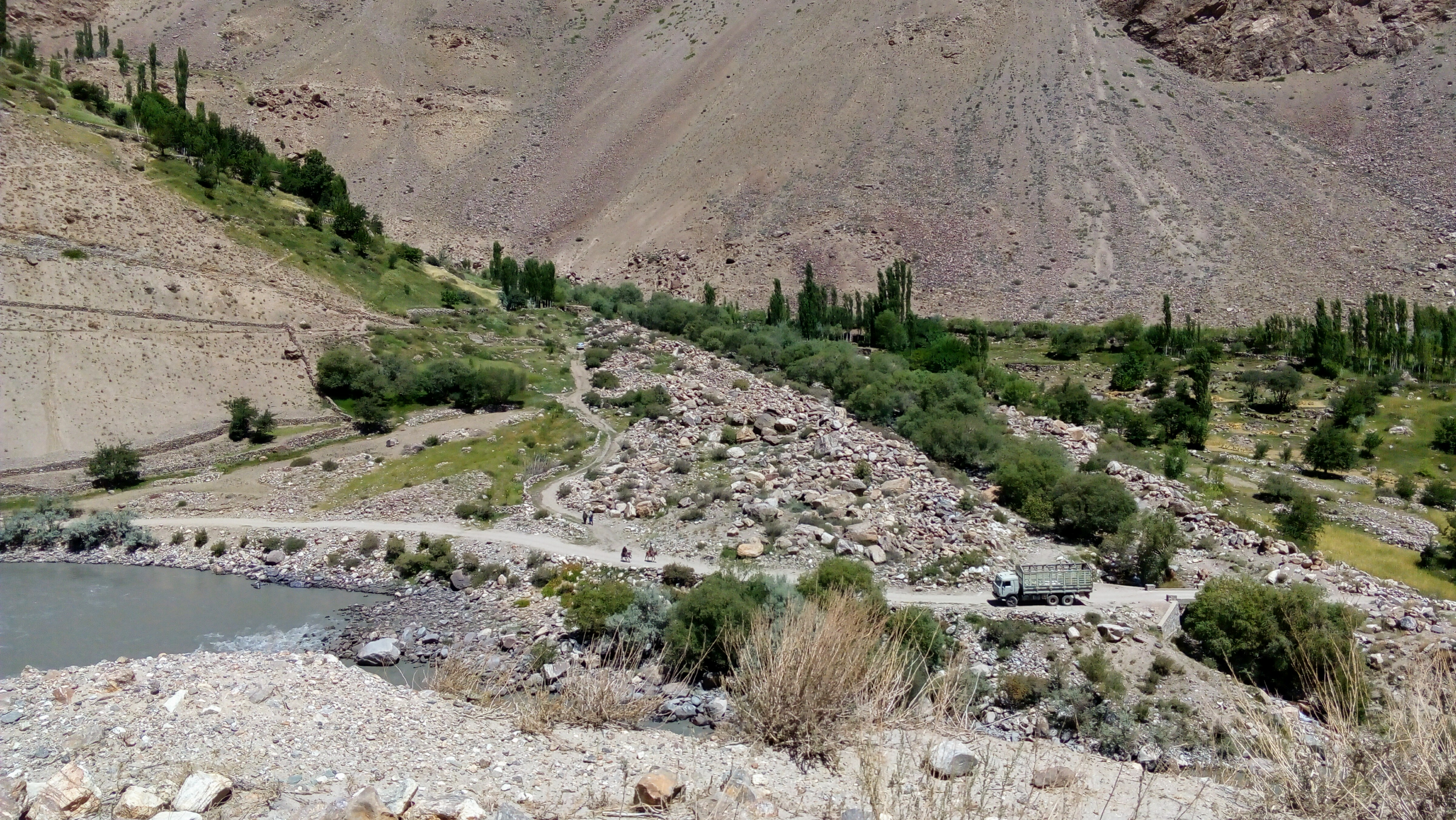
The Pamir Highway in Afghanistan

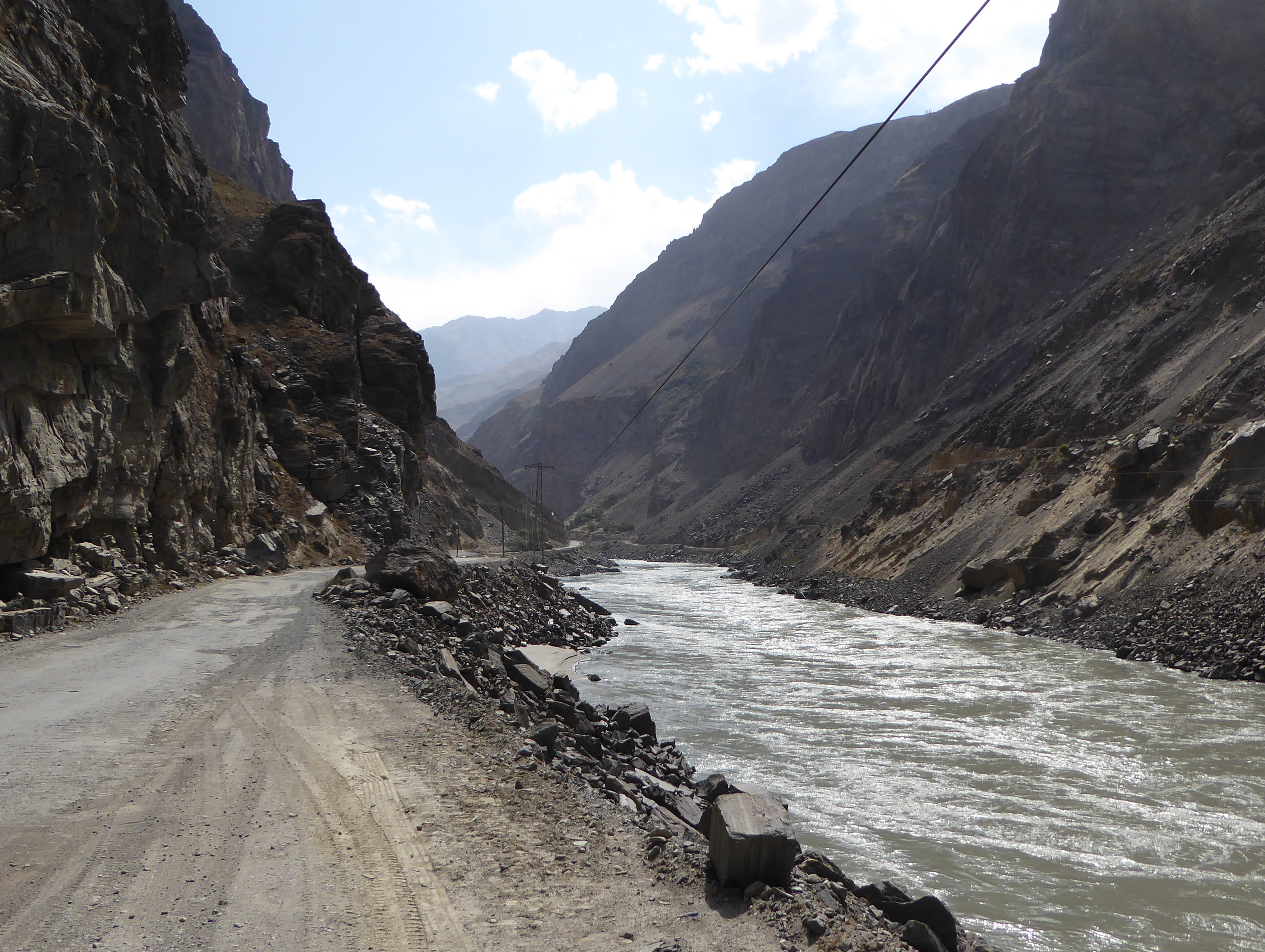
The Pamir Highway along the Afghan border

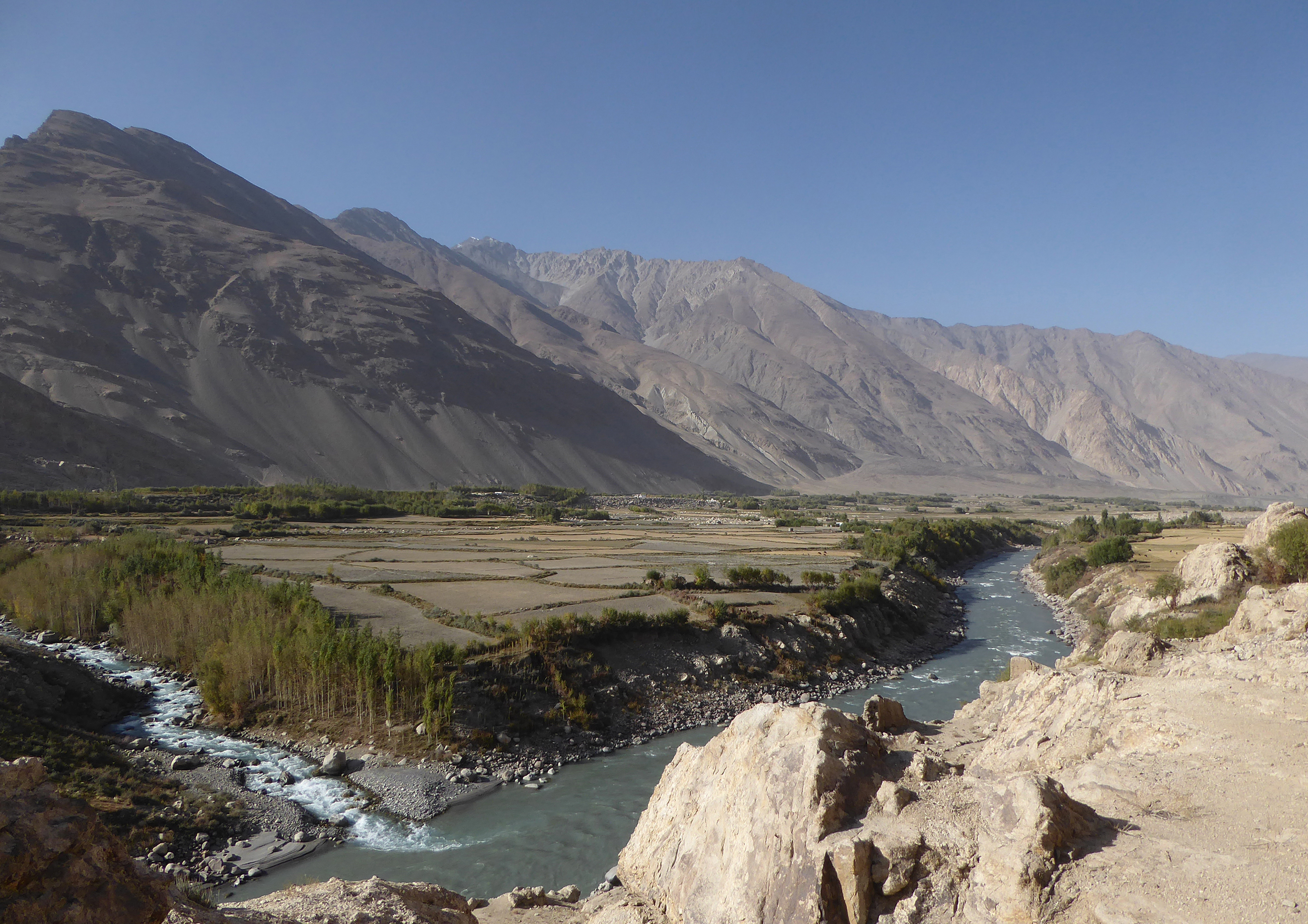
Wakhan river valley
