= Chong-Bülölü =

Chong-Bülölü Kyrgyz: Чоң-Бүлөлү
- Location within Kyrgyzstan
- Coordinates: 40°9′36″N 73°39′0″E
- Country: Kyrgyzstan
- Region: Osh Region
- District: Alay District
- Elevation: 2,273 m (7,457 ft)

Population (2021)
  - Total: 911
- Time zone: UTC+6

Chong-Bülölü (Kyrgyz: Чоң-Бүлөлү) is a village in Osh Region of Kyrgyzstan. It is part of the Alay District. Its population was 911 in 2021.

Nearby towns and villages include Kichi-Bülölü (3 miles) and Askaly (7 miles).
