= Alay Range =

Mountain range mostly in southwestern Kyrgyzstan

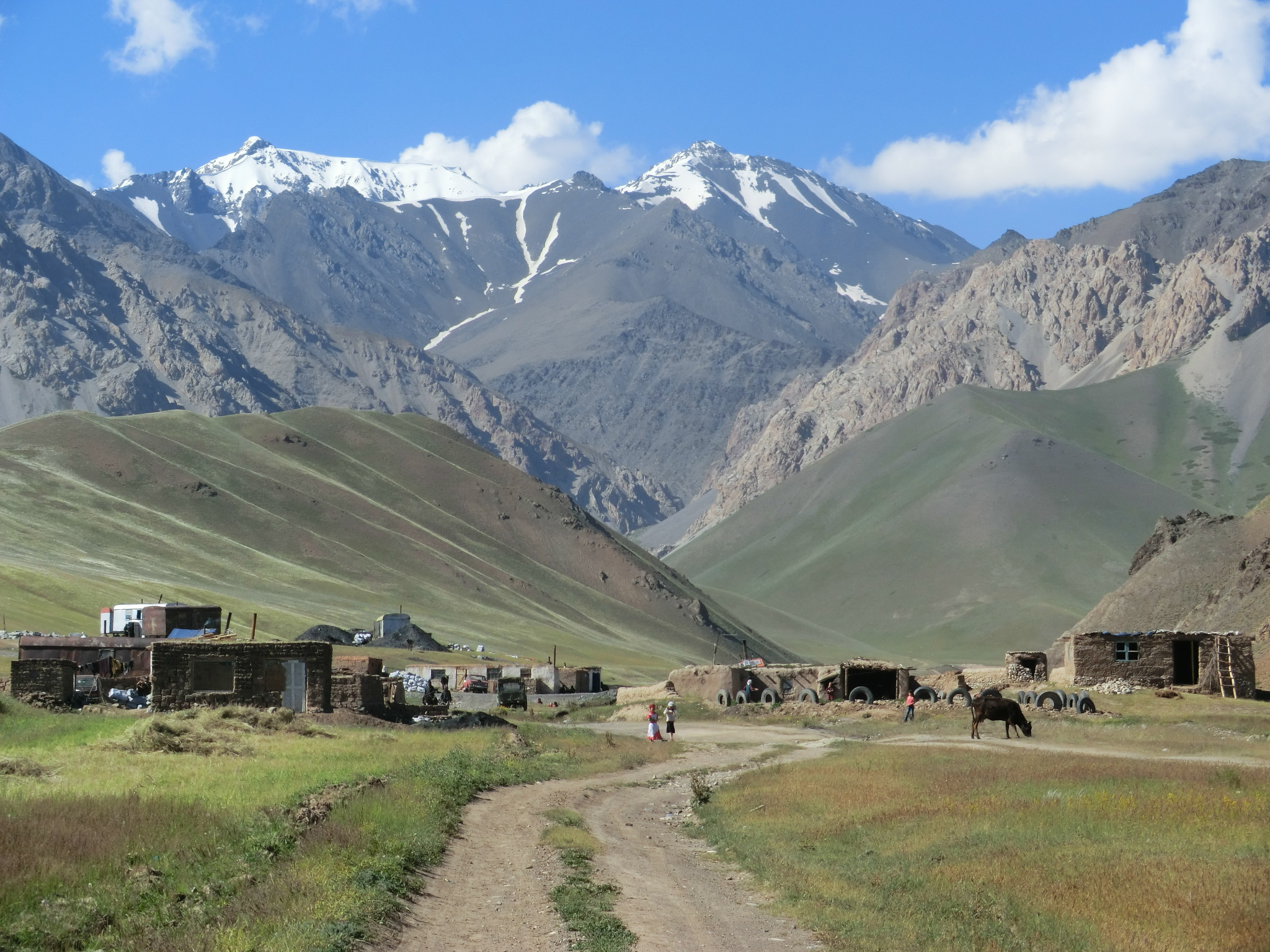
- Alai Range from Jiptik Valley

Highest point
- Peak: Pik Tandykul
- Elevation: 5,544 m (18,189 ft)

Dimensions
- Length: 350 km (220 mi) W-S
- Width: 20 km (12 mi) N-S

Naming
- Native name: Алай тоо кыркасы (Kyrgyz)

Geography
- Location within Kyrgyzstan
- Countries: Kyrgyzstan; Tajikistan
- Regions: Batken; Osh
- Range coordinates: 39°40′N 72°0′E

The Alay Range (Kyrgyz: Алай тоо кыркасы, romanized: Alai too kyrkasy; Russian: Алайский хребет) is a mountain range that extends from the Tien Shan mountain range in Kyrgyzstan west into Tajikistan. It is part of the Pamir-Alay mountain system. The range runs approximately east to west. Its highest summit is Pik Tandykul (Russian: пик Тандыкуль), reaching 5544 m. It forms the southern border of the Fergana Valley, and in the south it falls steeply to the Alay Valley. The southern slopes of the range drain into the Kyzylsuu or Vakhsh River, a tributary of the Amu Darya. The streams that drain the northern slopes of the range are tributaries of the Syr Darya, and empty into the Fergana Valley to the north of the range. Pik Skobeleva, 5,051 metres (16,572 ft), is also a well-known summit. European route E007: Tashkent – Kokand – Andijan – Osh – Irkeshtam crosses the range by the Taldyk Pass. The range is also traversed by Pamir highway.

Some imprecise sources seem to use the term for the whole southern curve of the Tian Shan corresponding to the southern border of Kyrgyzstan, to up north until the perpendicular extension known as Fergana Range, but strictly speaking the Alay Mountains are strictly north of Alay Valley, while confusingly, Trans-Alay Range of Pamir Mountains lies to the south of that valley, as well as Turkestan Range and Zarafshan Range at far southwest. Pamir-Alay is collective term for many systems above, but not including any of the Pamirs.

== Geology ==
The Alay Range, based on its genetic type, is a horst-anticline formation that emerged during the Hercynian orogeny. In its western and central parts, tectonic faults run parallel to the mountain, while in the eastern section, they are oriented from south to north. The geological structure of the range is highly complex:

- The western and central sections consist of Silurian, Devonian, and Carboniferous deposits with a thickness ranging from 1,500 to 3,000 meters. These include sandstone, siliceous and carbonaceous schists, gneiss, dolomite, siltstone, limestone, porphyry, tuff, diabase, polymictic, and limestone-based conglomerates.
- The eastern section features Jurassic formations up to 3,300 meters thick, consisting of conglomerates, gravelites, and argillites.

In some areas (such as the Kichi-Alay and Kaiyndy Mountains), these layers are intruded by granite, granodiorite, and syenite.

The foothills (including ridges and low mountains like Papan, Otuzadyr, and Katyrantoo) and the valley floors are covered with sedimentary rocks from the Paleogene, Neogene, and Quaternary periods, with thicknesses of up to 200 meters. These include clay, sand, marl, fine gravel, and moraine deposits.

The Alay Range contains deposits of mercury, antimony, iron, bauxite, tungsten, bismuth, polymetals, arsenic, coal, and other minerals, some of which hold industrial significance.

== See also ==
- Mount Imeon
- Trans-Alay Range
