= Alay District =

Coordinates: 40°19′N 73°26′E

Alay Kyrgyz: Алай району
- District
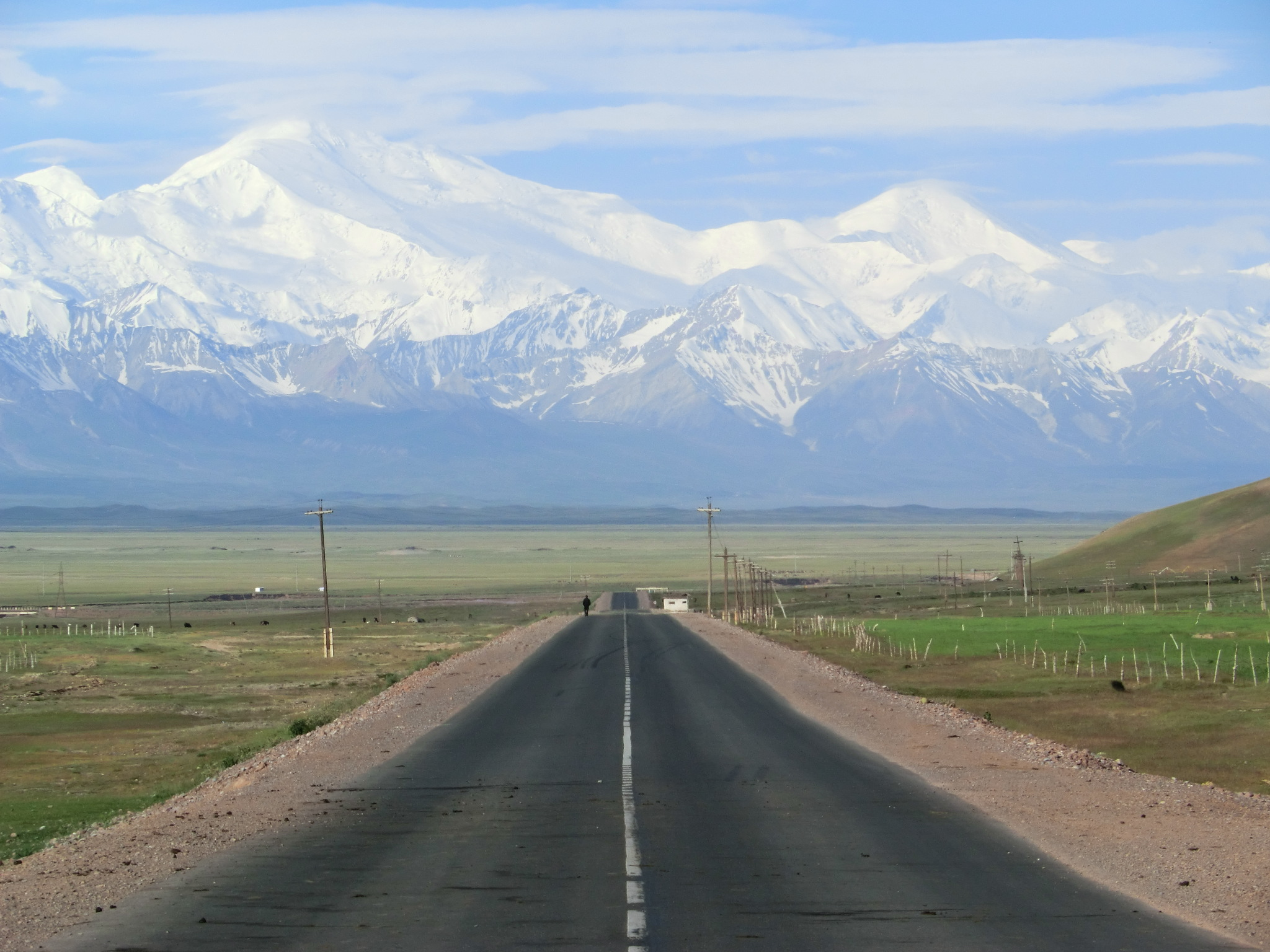
- The Pamirs with Lenin Peak from Sary-Tash

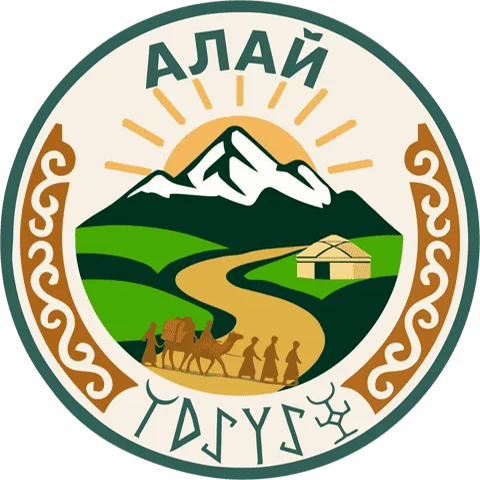
- Coat of arms

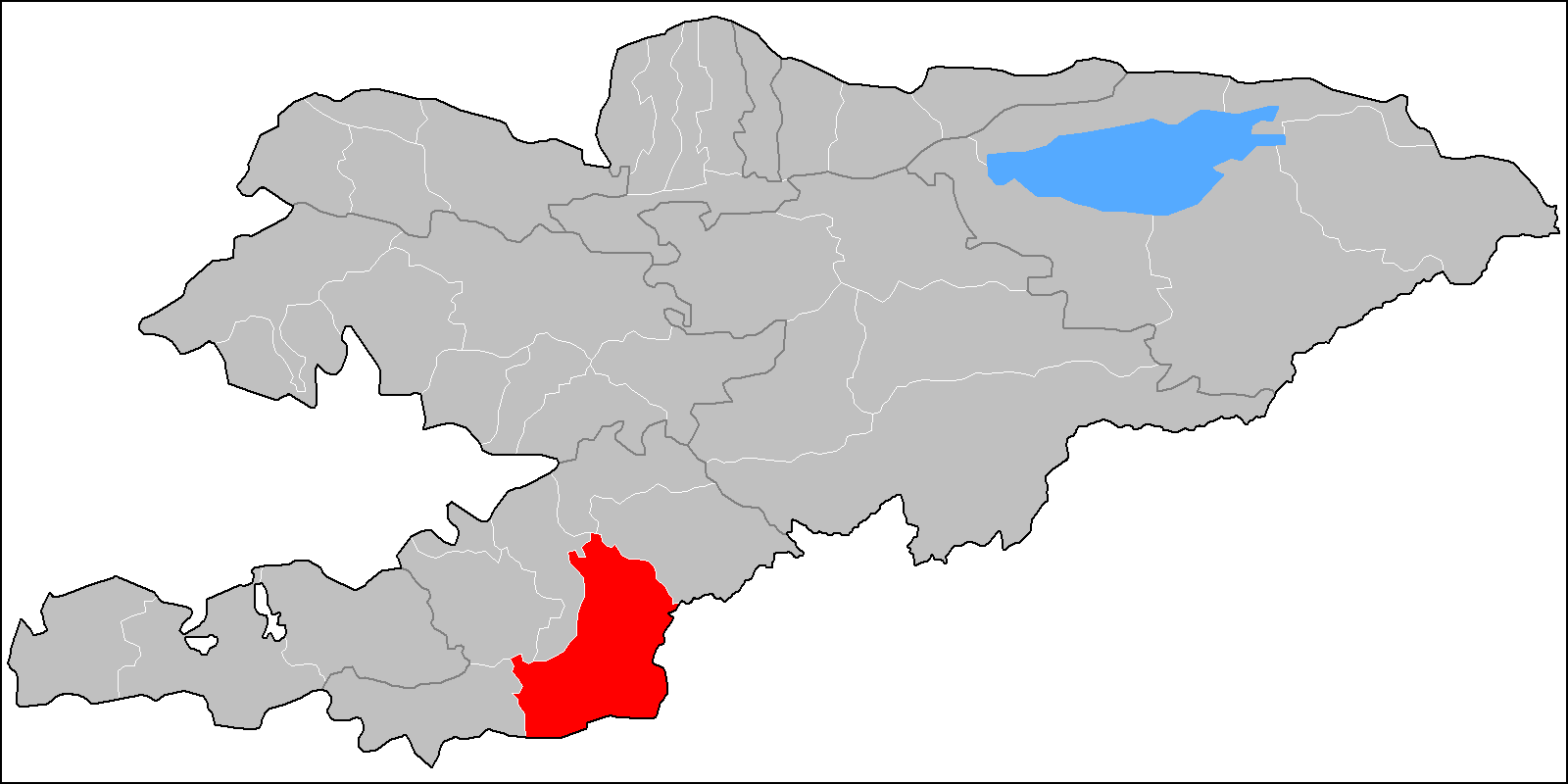
- Country: Kyrgyzstan
- Region: Osh Region

Area
  - Total: 6,821 km^{2} (2,634 sq mi)

Population (2021)
  - Total: 87,398
  - Density: 12.81/km^{2} (33.19/sq mi)
- Time zone: UTC+6

Alay (Kyrgyz: Алай району, romanized: Alay rayonu) is a district of Osh Region in south-western Kyrgyzstan. The capital is Gülchö. The Alay District borders with China in the east, Tajikistan in the south, Chong-Alay District in the west, Nookat District in the north-west, Kara-Suu District and Özgön District in the north, and Kara-Kulja District in the north-east. Its area is 6,821 square kilometres (2,634 sq mi), and its resident population was 87,398 in 2021.

== Demographics ==
According to the Population and Housing Census of 2009, the resident population of Alay District was 72,170. 1,427 people lived in urban areas, and 70,743 in rural ones. According to the 2009 Census, the ethnic composition of the Alay District (de jure population) was 99.6% Kyrgyz and 0.4% other groups.

Historical populations in Alay District
Year	Pop.	±% p.a.
1970	31,861	—
1979	40,253	+2.63%
1989	52,029	+2.60%
1999	65,822	+2.38%
2009	72,170	+0.92%
2021	87,398	+1.61%
Note: resident population; Sources:

=== Rural communities and villages ===
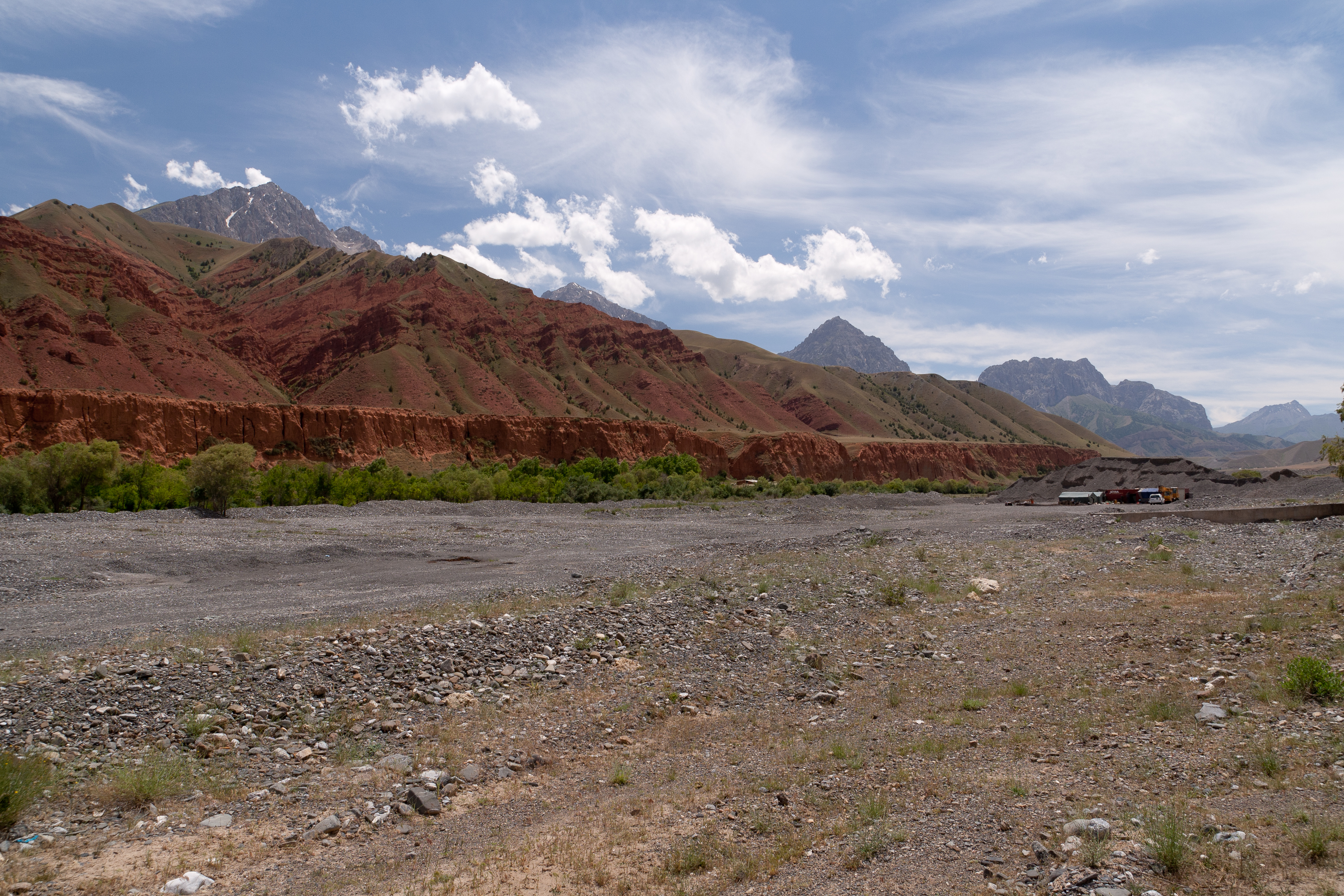
Gülchö river valley south of Gülchö close to the Taldyk Pass

In total Alay District include 65 settlements in 14 rural communities (ayyl aymagy). Each rural community can consist of one or several villages. The rural communities in Alay District are:

1. K. Belekbaev (seat: Sopu-Korgon; incl. Askaly, Jerge-Tal, Kolduk, Targalak, Terek and Chiy-Talaa)
2. Budalyk (seat: Kara-Suu; incl. Kaynama, Tamga-Terek, Kum-Shoro, Oktyabr and Oro-Döbö)
3. Bülölü (seat: Koshulush; incl. Kichi-Bülölü, Köl-Chaty and Chong-Bülölü)
4. Gülchö (seat: Gülchö; incl. Kara-Bulak, Jyly-Suu, Tash-Koroo, Chakmak and Kurmanjan Datka)
5. Jangy-Alay (seat: Jangy-Alay; incl. Jangy-Aryk)
6. Josholu (seat: Jangy-Turmush; incl. Ayuu-Tapan, Kommunizm, Lenin-Jol, Miyazdy, Orto-Suu, Osoaviakhim and Kara-Toktu)
7. Kabylan-Kol (seat: Kabylan-Kol; incl. Künggöy, Kara-Jygach and Kurulush)
8. Kongur-Döbö (seat: Boz-Karagan; incl. Jar-Kyshtak, Kara-Shoro, Arpa-Tektir and Kyzyl-Oy)
9. Korul (seat: Toguz-Bulak; incl. Keng-Jylga, Birinchi May and Aral)
10. Lenin (seat: Sogondu; incl. Gagarin, Kün-Elek, and Murdash)
11. Sary-Mogol (seat: Sary-Mogol)
12. Sary-Tash (seat: Sary-Tash; incl. Kök-Suu and Nura)
13. Taldy-Suu (seat: Taldy-Suu; incl. Archa-Bulak, Kök-Bulak, Kurgak and Sary-Mogol)
14. Üch-Döbö (seat: Kichi-Karakol; incl. Ak-Bosogo, Ak-Jay, Gejige, Kyzyl-Alay and Chong-Karakol)
Settlements of the Alay District.
Abbreviations: AT - Arpa-Tektir, JK - Jar-Kyshtak, JT - Jangy-Turmush, K - Kommunizm, KD - Kurmanjan Datka, KS - Kara-Shoro, LJ - Lenin-Jol, OA - Osoaviakhim, TT - Tamga-Terek.
