= Sary-Mogol =

Sary-Mogol Kyrgyz: Сары-Могол
- Location within Kyrgyzstan
- Coordinates: 39°40′30″N 72°53′00″E
- Country: Kyrgyzstan
- Region: Osh
- District: Alay
- Elevation: 2,980 m (9,780 ft)

Population (2021)
  - Total: 5,215
- Time zone: UTC+6

Sary-Mogol (Kyrgyz: Сары-Могол) is a village in Osh Region of Kyrgyzstan. It is part of the Alay District. Its population was 5,215 in 2021. It lies in the Alay Valley, north of the river Kyzyl-Suu, 32 km west of Sary-Tash.

== Population ==
Historical population
Year	Pop.	±% p.a.
2009	3,391	—
2021	5,215	+3.65%
Note: resident population; Sources:

== Climate ==
Climate data for Sary-Mogol
Month	Jan	Feb	Mar	Apr	May	Jun	Jul	Aug	Sep	Oct	Nov	Dec	Year
Mean daily maximum °C (°F)	−10.9 (12.4)	−8.5 (16.7)	−3.4 (25.9)	1.5 (34.7)	6.9 (44.4)	11.8 (53.2)	14.2 (57.6)	14.3 (57.7)	10.5 (50.9)	3.6 (38.5)	−4 (25)	−10.1 (13.8)	2.2 (35.9)
Daily mean °C (°F)	−16.1 (3.0)	−13.4 (7.9)	−8.3 (17.1)	−3.3 (26.1)	1.6 (34.9)	6 (43)	8.7 (47.7)	8.4 (47.1)	4.5 (40.1)	−2.6 (27.3)	−10.2 (13.6)	−15.5 (4.1)	−3.3 (26.0)
Mean daily minimum °C (°F)	−21.2 (−6.2)	−18.5 (−1.3)	−14 (7)	−9.3 (15.3)	−4.7 (23.5)	−0.8 (30.6)	2.3 (36.1)	2 (36)	−1.8 (28.8)	−8.8 (16.2)	−16.5 (2.3)	−21.1 (−6.0)	−9.4 (15.2)
Average precipitation mm (inches)	19 (0.7)	27 (1.1)	39 (1.5)	39 (1.5)	56 (2.2)	95 (3.7)	107 (4.2)	78 (3.1)	37 (1.5)	25 (1.0)	23 (0.9)	24 (0.9)	569 (22.3)
Source: Climate-Data.org
