= Kyzyl-Alay =

Kyzyl-Alay Кызыл-Алай Chagyr
- Location within Kyrgyzstan
- Coordinates: 39°51′36″N 73°16′48″E
- Country: Kyrgyzstan
- Region: Osh Region
- Elevation: 2,654 m (8,707 ft)

Population (2021)
  - Total: 1,310
- Time zone: UTC+6

Kyzyl-Alay (Kyrgyz: Кызыл-Алай) also known as Chagyr (Kyrgyz: Чагыр) is a mountain village in Osh Region of Kyrgyzstan, near highway M41. It is part of the Alay District. Its population was 1,310 in 2021.

Nearby towns and villages include Ak-Bosogo (8 km or 5 mi) and Chong-Karakol (13 km or 8 mi).
