= Kurumdy Mountain =

Mountain on the Kyrgyzstan–China border

- Gora Kurumdy
- Location within Kyrgyzstan Location within China

Highest point
- Elevation: 6,614 m (21,699 ft)
- Prominence: 2,278 m (7,474 ft)Lenin Peak
- Parent peak: Lenin Peak
- Listing: Ultra
- Coordinates: 39°27′N 73°34′E

Geography
- Location: Kyrgyzstan–China border
- Parent range: Pamir Mountains

Climbing
- First ascent: 1932 or 2001

Kurumdy Mountain is a mountain in the Pamir Mountains of Central Asia, in the eastern section of the Trans-Alay Range. Kurumdy (Kurumdy I summit) has an elevation of 6,614 metres (21,699 ft) above sea level and sits on the international border between Kyrgyzstan and China. Korumdu is the Kyrgyz name for this area.

== Location ==
Kurumdy is located in the eastern part of the Trans-Alay Range in the Pamir Mountains of Central Asia. It is 22 km east of the Kyzyl-Art Pass. On the northern side flows the East Kyzilsy Glacier with a length of 3,7 km and an area of 69,4 km^{2}. The Kurumdy Glacier with a length of 17.2 km (10.7 mi) and area of 60.6 km^{2} (23.4 sq mi) is located on the south side and flows to the west.

Since territorial changes in 2011, it has been a three state summit between Kyrgyzstan and Tajikistan and China.

== Climbing history ==
There is some uncertainty concerning the first ascent. An ascent by E. Timashev and party from the south apparently reached the main summit in 1932. However, other sources surmise this party only made it to Kurumdu West (6154 m).

On October 1, 2001, Michael Mihajlov and Vitaliy Akimov reached the Kurumdy I summit by climbing a major north ridge. This would be the first ascent if the 1932 ascent was only to Kurumdu West.

The first traverse (East-West, 15 days) was accomplished in the summer of 2015 by the Austrians Markus Gschwendt and Katharina Pfnaisl. This was the second ascent of the main summit (6614 m, 5 August 2015). As well as this, they traversed several other 6000 m peaks, two of which were unclimbed at this time. For the ascent they used a very steep slope east of the Kurumdy east summits (6384 m, Peak Kathi 6259 m). The descent was done by crossing the west summits (6554 m, 6283 m) and then following a north ridge to Golova Orla 5440 m from where they reached the Basecamp (3770 m)

== Information for visitors ==
The area requires a border permit to visit.

Approach from the north, Kyrgyzstan: Airport in Osh, Taxi to Sari Tash, with Horses to the basecamp on the northern side of the East Kyzilsy Glacier at 3770 m. Water quality can be a problem. Bring a water filter system.

There is no easy line to the summit. Success depends on snow conditions and weather.

== See also ==
- List of Ultras of Central Asia
