= Kün-Elek =

Village in Osh Region, Kyrgyzstan

Kün-Elek Kyrgyz: Күң-Элек Kun-Elek
- Location within Kyrgyzstan
- Coordinates: 40°08′25″N 73°29′55″E
- Country: Kyrgyzstan
- Region: Osh Region
- District: Alay District
- Rural community: Jibek-Jolu
- Elevation: 1,831 m (6,007 ft)

Population (2025)
  - Total: 1,565
- Time zone: UTC+6

Kün-Elek (Kyrgyz: Күң-Элек) is a village in Osh Region of Kyrgyzstan. It is part of the Alay District and the Jibek-Jolu rural community.

== Geography ==
Kün-Elek is situated on the right bank of the Kün-Elek River, near its confluence with the Gulcha River. The village lies approximately 19 km south-southeast of Gulcha, the administrative centre of Alay District, at an elevation of 1,831 m above sea level.

== Population ==
Historical population of Kün-Elek
Year	Pop.	±% p.a.
2021	1,584	—
2025	1,565	−0.30%
