= European route E007 =

Road in trans-European E-road network

E007

Route information
- Length: 700 km (430 mi)

Major junctions
- From: Tashkent
- Kokand, Andijan, Osh
- To: Irkeshtam

Location
- Countries: Uzbekistan; Kyrgyzstan

Highway system
- International E-road network; A Class; B Class
← E006	→ E008

E 007 is a European B class road in Uzbekistan and Kyrgyzstan, connecting the cities Tashkent – Kokand – Andijan – Osh – Irkeshtam

== Route ==
- Uzbekistan
  - A373A A373A Road: Tashkent (E 40, E 123) - Ohangaron
  - A373 A373 Road: Ohangaron - Angren - Andijon - Border with Kyrgyzstan
  - A373B A373B Road: Connection to Kokand (E 006)
- Kyrgyzstan
  - ЭМ-15 ЭМ-15 Road: Border of Uzbekistan - Osh (Connects to E010)
  - ЭМ-05 ЭМ-05 Road: Osh - Taldyk Pass - Sary-Tash (Start of concurrency with E60) - Erkeshtam (at the border to China)
