= Terek, Alay =

Terek Kyrgyz: Терек
- Location within Kyrgyzstan
- Coordinates: 40°01′00″N 73°33′00″E
- Country: Kyrgyzstan
- Region: Osh Region
- District: Alay District
- Elevation: 2,051 m (6,729 ft)

Population (2021)
  - Total: 1,576
- Time zone: UTC+6

Terek (Kyrgyz: Терек, romanized: Terek) is a village in Osh Region of Kyrgyzstan. It is part of the Alay District. Its population was 1,576 in 2021.

Nearby towns and villages include Sopu-Korgon (3 miles), Jerge-Tal (4 miles) and Askaly (5 miles).
