= Sogondu =

Sogondu Kyrgyz: Согонду
- Location within Kyrgyzstan
- Coordinates: 40°12′36″N 73°30′36″E
- Country: Kyrgyzstan
- Region: Osh Region
- District: Alay District
- Elevation: 2,062 m (6,765 ft)

Population (2021)
  - Total: 3,074
- Time zone: UTC+6

Sogondu (Kyrgyz: Согонду) is a village in Osh Region of Kyrgyzstan. It is part of the Alay District. Its population was 3,074 in 2021.
