= Jyly-Suu =

Jyly-Suu Kyrgyz: Жылы-Суу
- Location within Kyrgyzstan
- Coordinates: 40°16′40″N 73°25′40″E
- Country: Kyrgyzstan
- Region: Osh
- District: Alay
- Elevation: 1,907 m (6,257 ft)

Population (2021)
  - Total: 709
- Time zone: UTC+6

Jyly-Suu (Kyrgyz: Жылы-Суу), known as Tambashat (Kyrgyz: Тамбашат, romanized: Tambashat) before 2003, is a village in the Osh Region of Kyrgyzstan. It is part of the Alay District. Its population was 709 in 2021.
