= Taldyk Pass =

- Талдык ашуусу
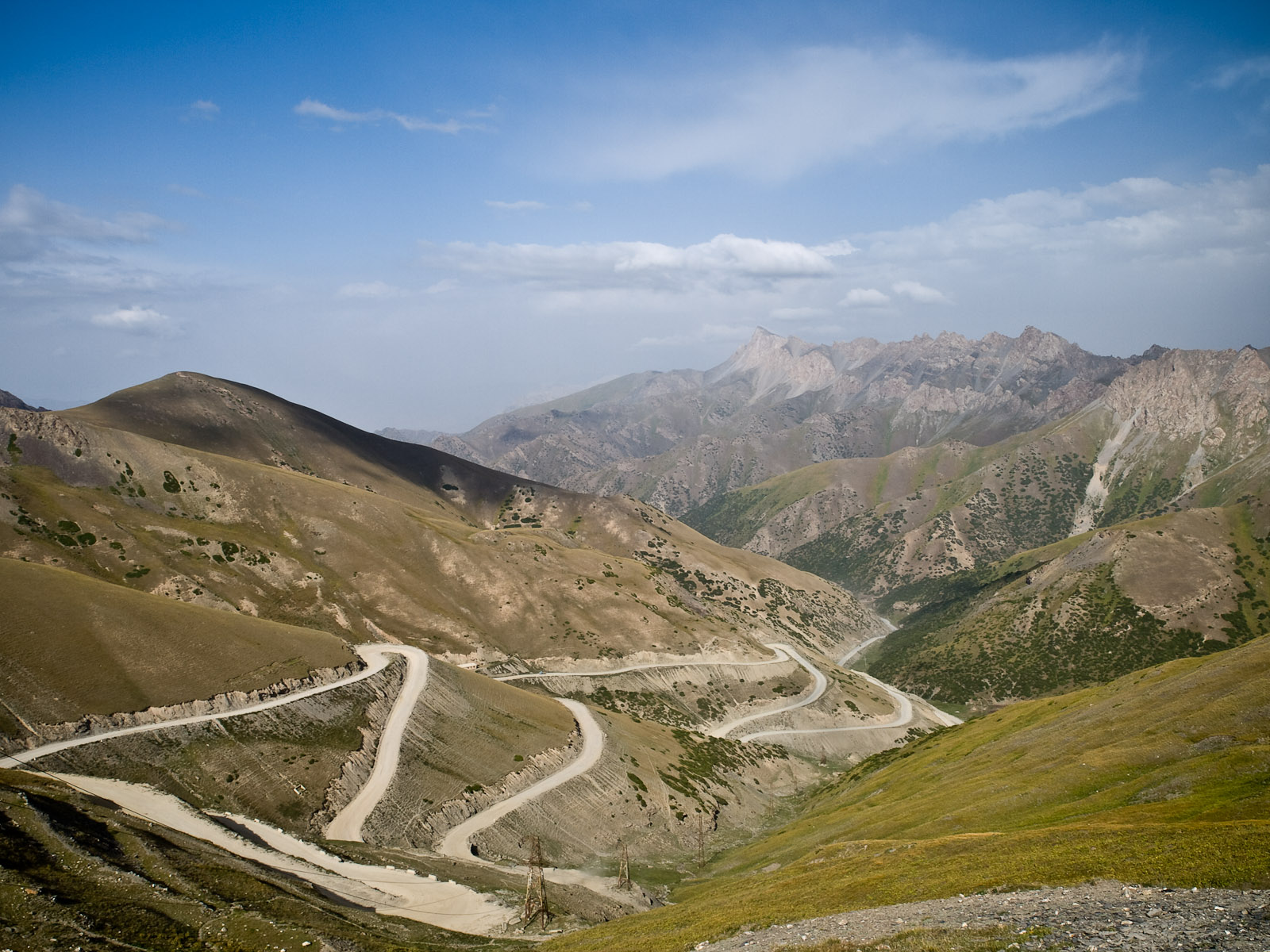
- View from Taldyk Pass to the north

- Location within Kyrgyzstan
- Elevation: 3,615 metres (11,860 ft)
- Traversed by: ЭМ-05 , M41 , E007

Third Approach
- Location: Kyrgyzstan
- Range: Alay Mountains
- Coordinates: 39°45′54″N 73°10′06″E

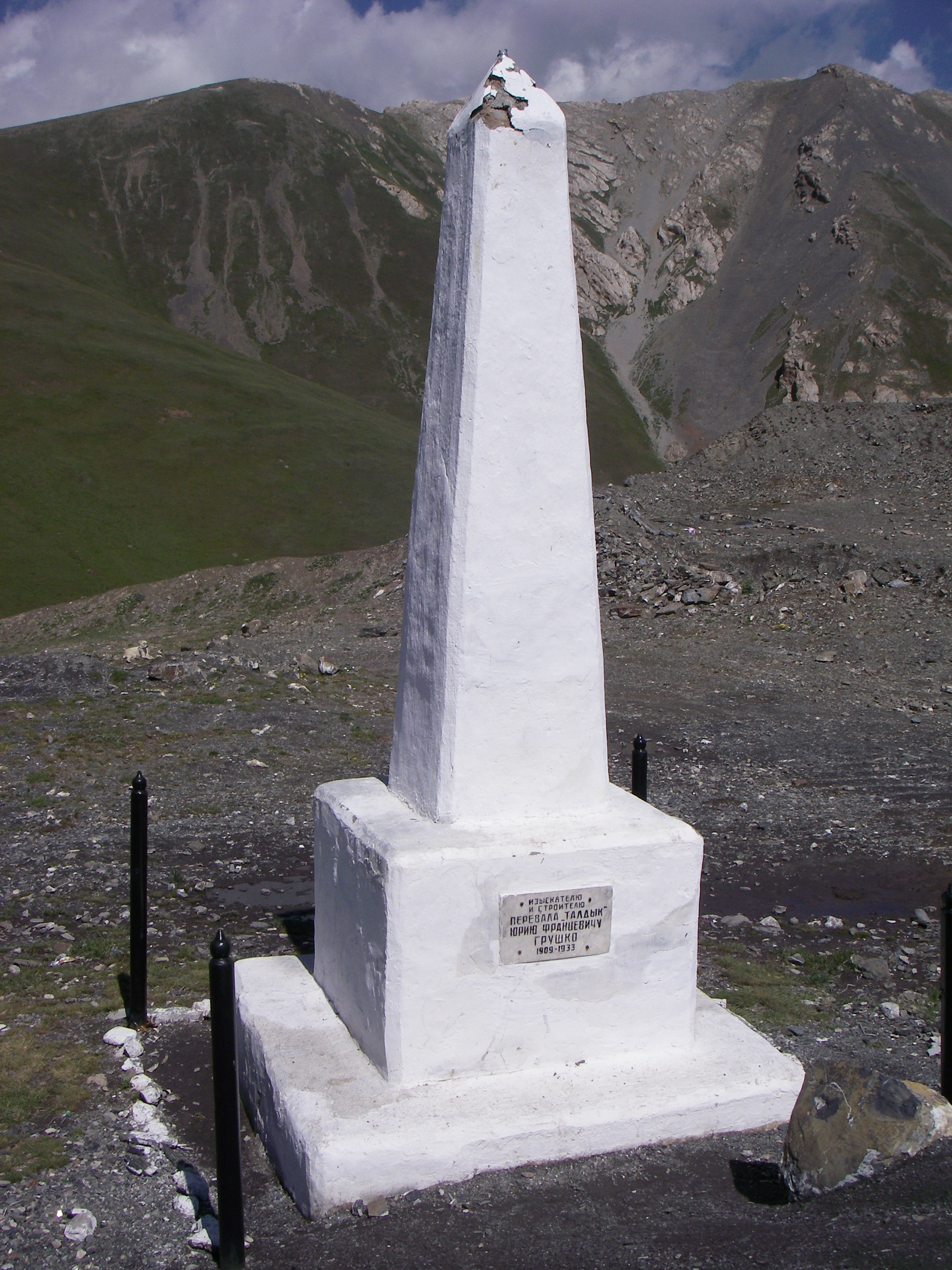
Monument to Yuri Grushko

Taldyk Pass is an all year round pass in the Alay Mountains of Osh Region of Kyrgyzstan. The elevation of the pass is 3,615 metres (11,860 ft). The pass is traversed by European route E007, route M41, and ЭМ-05 Road: Osh - Taldyk Pass - Sary-Tash.

== History ==
The first cart road through the pass was constructed as early as in 1876. It served as a communication way to Alay Valley for a military detachment headed by the Russian general Abramov. However, in the records of expedition through Pamir route in 1883 Captain Putyata indicates that the road can not be used for this purpose anymore due to road blockage by rockfalls in some locations. The cart road was reconstructed in 1893 by Colonel of the Imperial Russian Army Bronislav Grombchevsky. It is reported that there was a commemorative sign with the inscription: "Taldyk pass...88 verst from Gulcha" at the pass during travels to Alay of Nikolai Korzhenevskiy, a Russian Empire and Soviet geographer and explorer, in 1903 and later.

The paved road from Osh to Khorugh (eastern Tajikistan) was built through the pass in 1930–1932. Presently there is a monument to the memory of the construction manager Yuri M.Grushko at the pass.

In December 2008 Export–Import Bank of China provided $75.29 million in loan and US$7.5 million in grant for rehabilitation of the road segment crossing Taldyk Pass (km 123 -190). The project was completed in December 2013
