= Keng-Jylga =

Keng-Jylga Kyrgyz: Кең-Жылга
- Location within Kyrgyzstan
- Coordinates: 40°22′48″N 73°30′0″E
- Country: Kyrgyzstan
- Region: Osh Region
- District: Alay District
- Elevation: 2,089 m (6,854 ft)

Population (2021)
  - Total: 2,709
- Time zone: UTC+6

Keng-Jylga (Kyrgyz: Кең-Жылга) is a village in the Osh Region of Kyrgyzstan. It is part of the Alay District. Its population was 2,709 in 2021.
