= Ayuu-Tapan =

Ayuu-Tapan Kyrgyz: Аюу-Тапан
- Location within Kyrgyzstan
- Coordinates: 40°20′10″N 73°40′0″E
- Country: Kyrgyzstan
- Region: Osh Region
- District: Alay District
- Elevation: 2,402 m (7,881 ft)

Population (2021)
  - Total: 1,337
- Time zone: UTC+6

Ayuu-Tapan (Kyrgyz: Аюу-Тапан, romanized: Ayuu-Tapan) is a village in Osh Region of Kyrgyzstan. It is part of the Alay District. Its population was 1,337 in 2021.
