= Ak-Baital Pass =

Mountain pass in Tajikistan

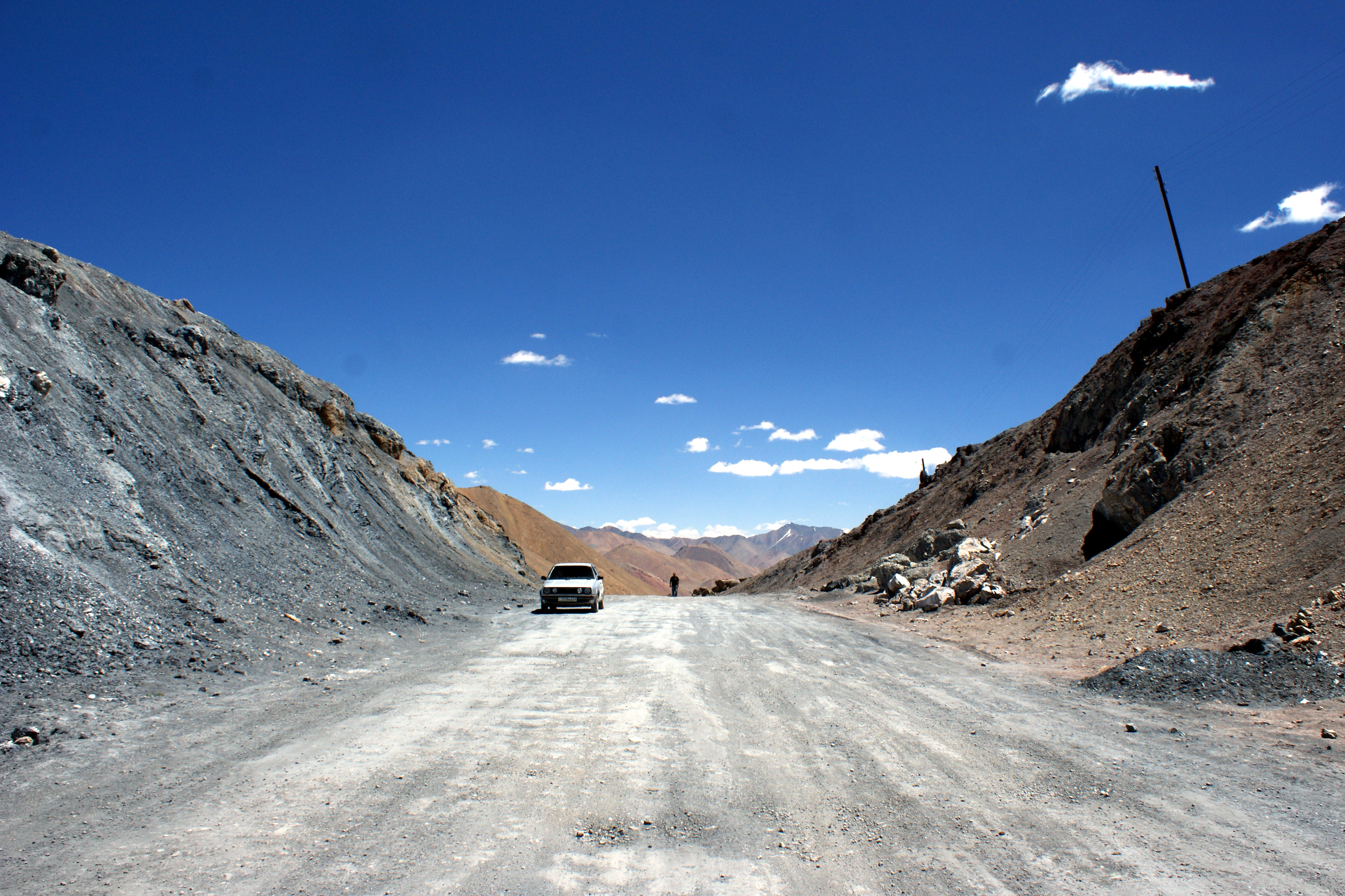

- Location within Tajikistan
- Elevation: 4,655 metres (15,272 ft)

Third Approach
- Location: Tajikistan
- Range: Pamir Mountains
- Coordinates: 38°33′39.4″N 73°35′51″E

The Ak-Baital Pass (Russian: Акбайтал; Tajik: Оқбайтал; Kyrgyz: Ак-Байтал) is a mountain pass in the Pamir Mountains in Tajikistan (GBAO region). At 4,655 metres (15,272 ft) it is the highest point of the M41 highway.

== Gallery ==
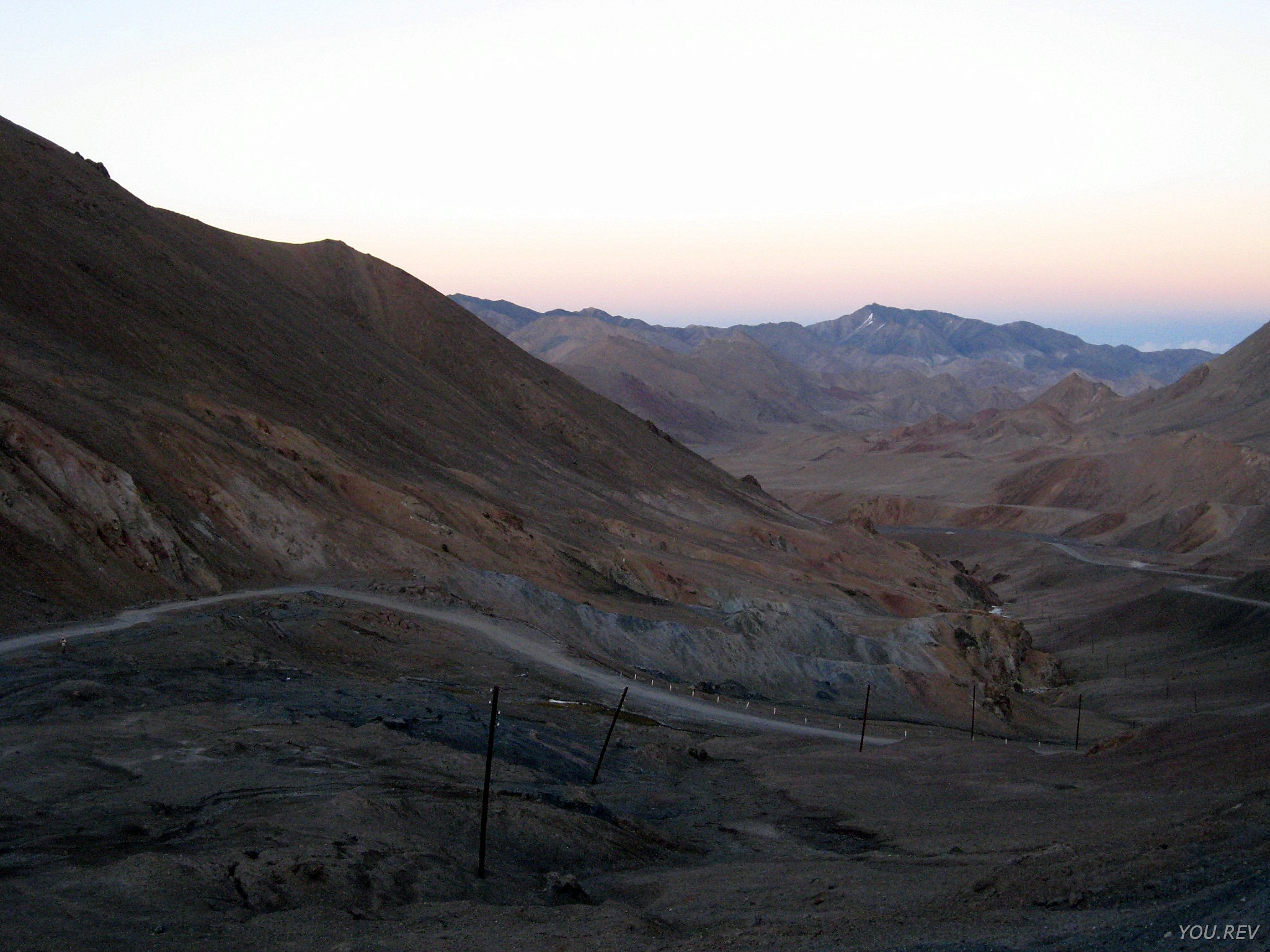

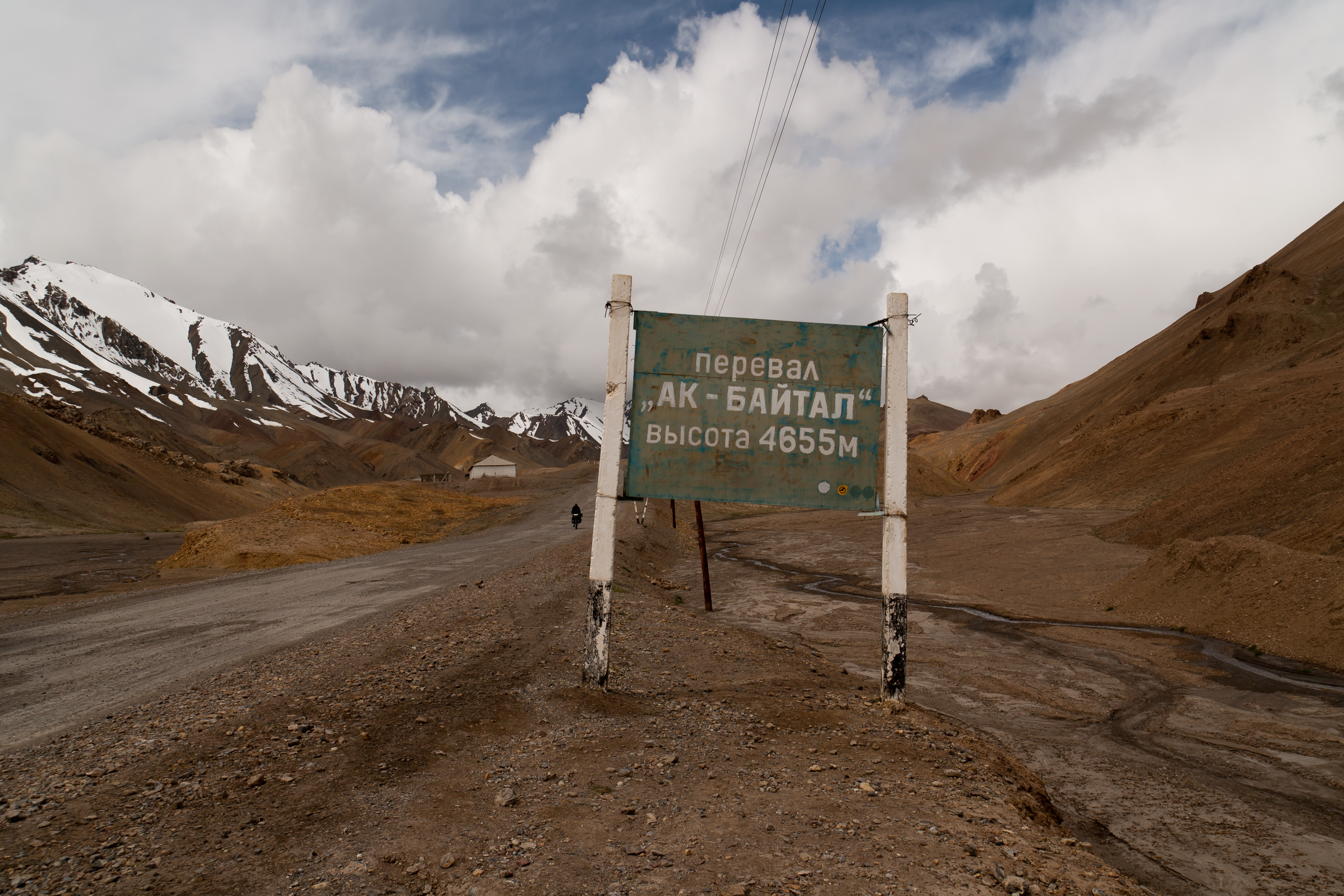
Ak-Bajtal pass(4655 m).

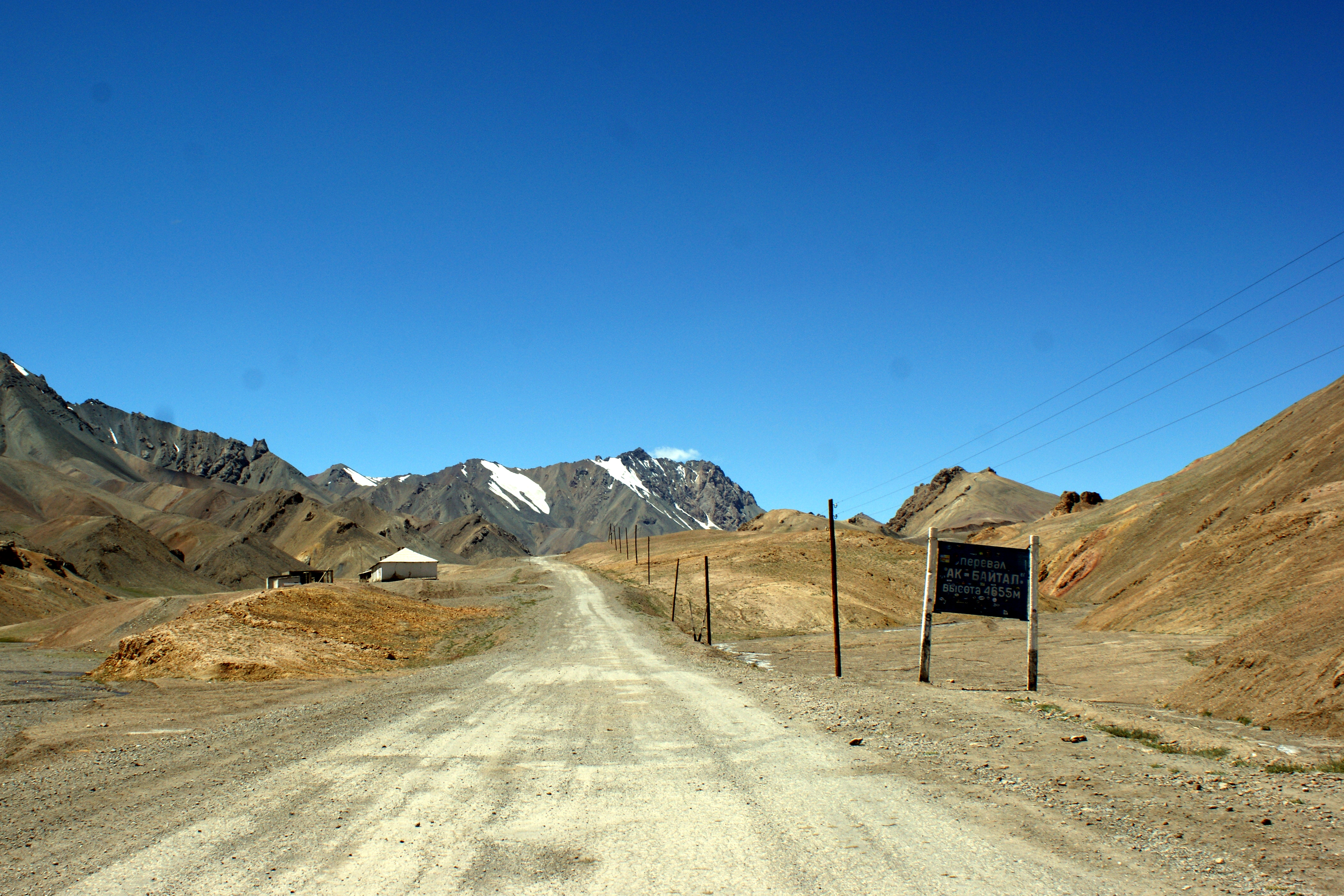
Ak-Bajtal pass(4655 m).

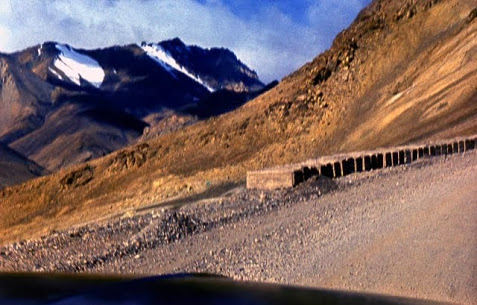

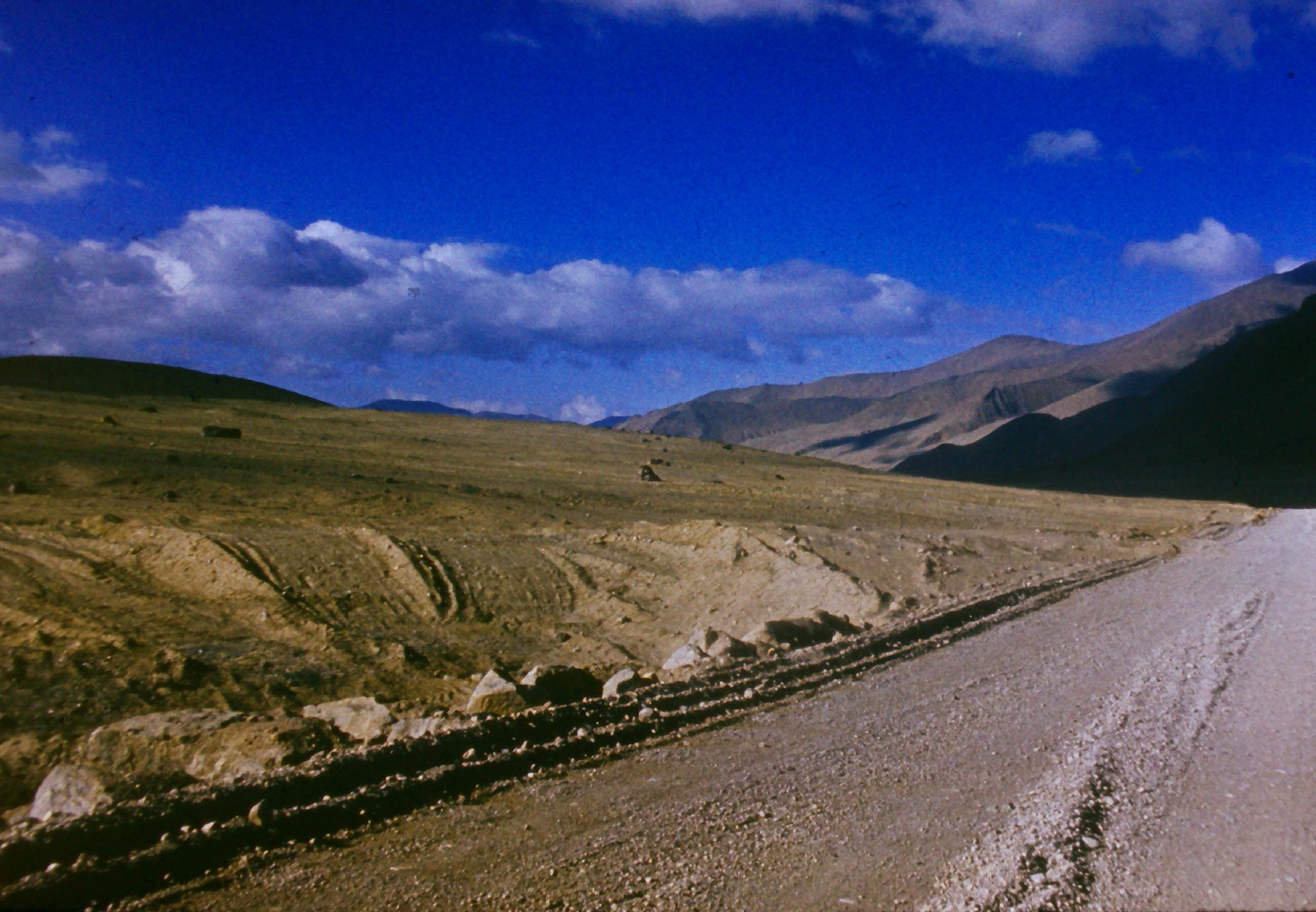

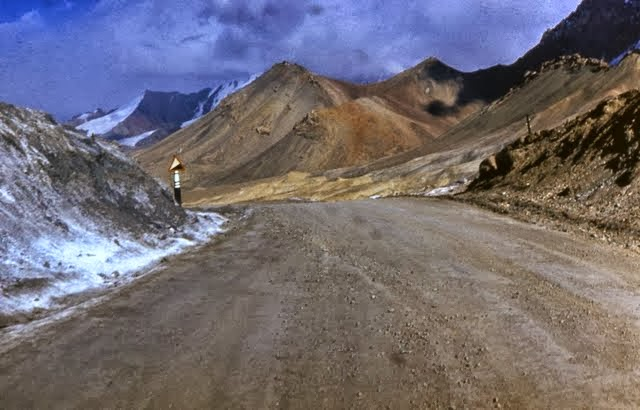
