= Ak-Bosogo =

Ak-Bosogo Kyrgyz: Ак-Босого
- Location within Kyrgyzstan
- Coordinates: 39°48′0″N 73°14′0″E
- Country: Kyrgyzstan
- Region: Osh Region
- District: Alay District
- Elevation: 3,126 m (10,256 ft)

Population (2021)
  - Total: 1,841
- Time zone: UTC+6

Ak-Bosogo (Kyrgyz: Ак-Босого) is a mountain village in the Osh Region of Kyrgyzstan along highway M41. It is part of the Alay District. Its population was 1,841 in 2021.

Nearby towns and villages include the road junction of Sary-Tash (8 km or 5 mi south) and Chagyr (8 km or 5 mi north).
