= Toguz-Bulak, Alay =

Toguz-Bulak Kyrgyz: Тогуз-Булак
- Location within Kyrgyzstan
- Coordinates: 40°22′48″N 73°24′36″E
- Country: Kyrgyzstan
- Region: Osh Region
- District: Alay District
- Elevation: 1,566 m (5,138 ft)

Population (2021)
  - Total: 2,584
- Time zone: UTC+6

Toguz-Bulak (Kyrgyz: Тогуз-Булак) is a village in Osh Region of Kyrgyzstan. It is part of the Alay District. Its population was 2,584 in 2021.
