= Köl-Chaty =

Köl-Chaty Kyrgyz: Көл-Чаты
- Location within Kyrgyzstan
- Coordinates: 40°10′10″N 73°35′0″E
- Country: Kyrgyzstan
- Region: Osh Region
- District: Alay District

Population (2021)
  - Total: 274
- Time zone: UTC+6

Köl-Chaty (Kyrgyz: Көл-Чаты) is a village in Osh Region of Kyrgyzstan. It is part of the Alay District. Its population was 274 in 2021.
