= Ohangaron District =

Coordinates: 40.9065°N 69.6353°E

Ohangaron
- District
- Ohangaron tumani
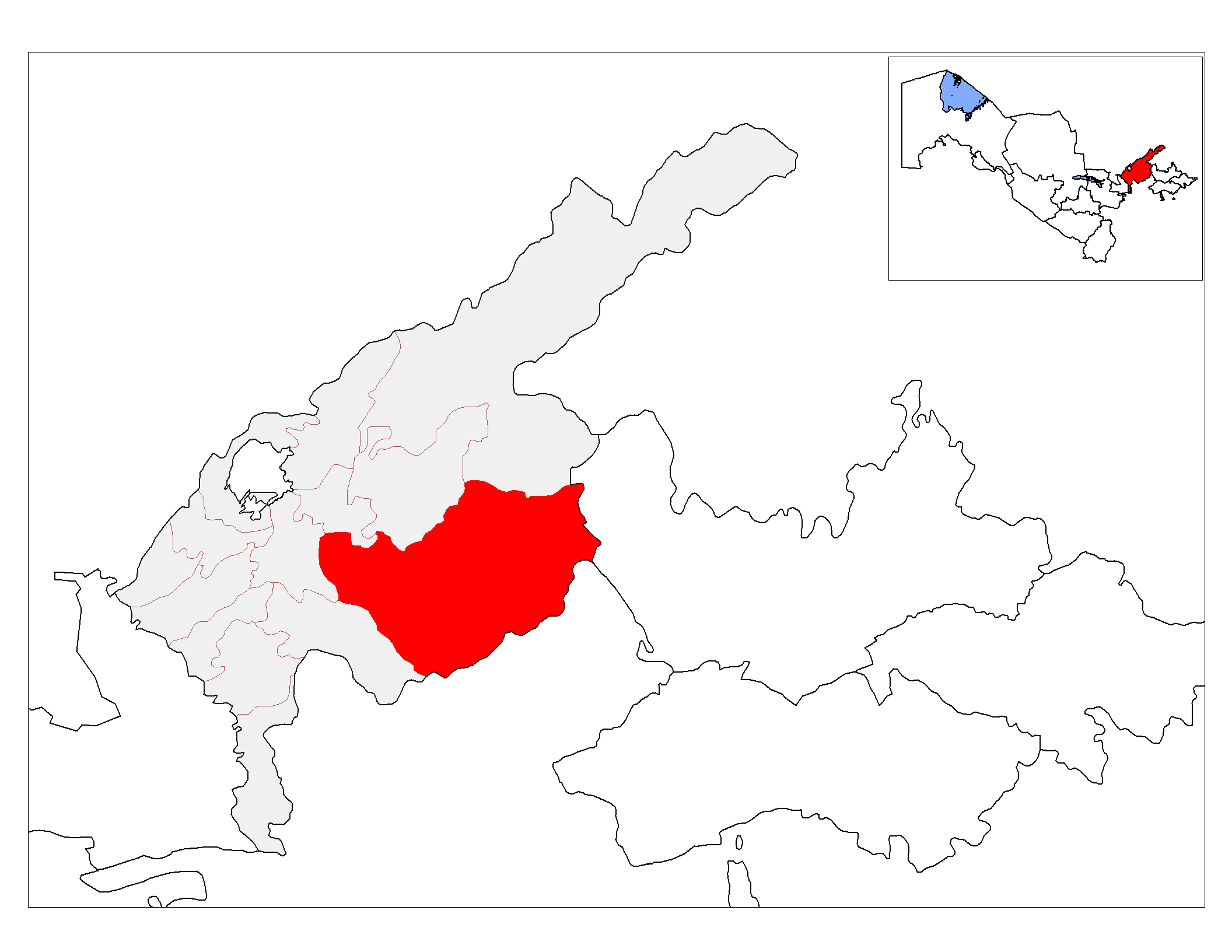
- Country: Uzbekistan
- Region: Tashkent Region
- Capital: Ohangaron
- Established: 1929

Area
  - Total: 3,180 km^{2} (1,230 sq mi)

Population (2021)
  - Total: 97,000
  - Density: 31/km^{2} (79/sq mi)
- Time zone: UTC+5 (UZT)

Ohangaron is a district of Tashkent Region in Uzbekistan. The capital lies at the city Ohangaron, which itself administratively not part of the district. It has an area of 3,180 km^{2} (1,230 sq mi) and it had 97,000 inhabitants in 2021. The district consists of 4 urban-type settlements (Yon-ariq, Qora Xitoy, Telov, Eyvalek) and 8 rural communities (Uvaq, Birlik, Doʻstlik, Qurama, Qora xitoy, Ozodlik, Susam, Telov).
