= Jangy-Turmush =

Jangy-Turmush Kyrgyz: Жаңы-Турмуш
- Location within Kyrgyzstan
- Coordinates: 40°20′0″N 73°34′20″E
- Country: Kyrgyzstan
- Region: Osh Region
- District: Alay District

Population (2021)
  - Total: 1,208
- Time zone: UTC+6

Jangy-Turmush (Kyrgyz: Жаңы-Турмуш) is a village in Osh Region of Kyrgyzstan. It is part of the Alay District. Its population was 1,208 in 2021.
