= Kara-Shoro =

Kara-Shoro Kyrgyz: Кара-Шоро
- Location within Kyrgyzstan
- Coordinates: 40°20′30″N 73°23′10″E
- Country: Kyrgyzstan
- Region: Osh Region
- District: Alay District
- Elevation: 1,482 m (4,862 ft)

Population (2021)
  - Total: 1,750
- Time zone: UTC+6

Kara-Shoro (Kyrgyz: Кара-Шоро) is a village in Osh Region of Kyrgyzstan. It is part of the Alay District. Its population was 1,750 in 2021.
