= Askaly =

Askaly Kyrgyz: Аскалы
- Location within Kyrgyzstan
- Coordinates: 40°4′48″N 73°34′48″E
- Country: Kyrgyzstan
- Region: Osh Region
- District: Alay District
- Elevation: 2,450 m (8,040 ft)

Population (2021)
  - Total: 797
- Time zone: UTC+6

Askaly (Kyrgyz: Аскалы) is a village in Osh Region of Kyrgyzstan. It is part of the Alay District. Its population was 797 in 2021.

Nearby towns and villages include Terek (5 miles) and Sopu-Korgon (6 miles).
