= European route E009 =

Road in trans-European E-road network

E009

Route information
- Length: 700 km (430 mi)

Major junctions
- From: Jirgatal
- To: border of Afghanistan

Location
- Countries: Tajikistan

Highway system
- International E-road network; A Class; B Class

E 009 is a European B class road in Tajikistan, connecting the cities Jirgatal – Khorugh – Ishkoshim – Lyanga – border of Afghanistan

== Route ==
- Tajikistan
  - РБ07 РБ07 Road: Vahdat (Jirgatol) - Gharm (Rasht) - Labi Jar (E 60)
  - РБ03 РБ03 Road: Labi Jar - Qal'ai Khumb
  - РБ04 РБ04 Road: Qal'ai Khumb - Khorugh (E 008)
  - РБ06 РБ06 Road: Khorugh - Ishkoshim - Langar - Border of Afghanistan
- Afghanistan
  - Wakhan Corridor: Theoretically, E009 will go from Border of Tajikistan, Dehqan Khana to the border of China. Such a road does not exist in reality
