= Pik Tandykul =

Mountain in Kyrgyzstan and Tajikistan

- Location within Kyrgyzstan

Highest point
- Elevation: 5,544 m (18,189 ft)
- Prominence: 1,677 m (5,502 ft)
- Isolation: 36.55 km (22.71 mi)
- Listing: Ultra
- Coordinates: 39°26′54″N 71°05′00″E

Geography
- Location: Kyrgyzstan–Tajikistan border
- Parent range: Alay Mountains

Tandykul Peak (Note: Russian: пик Тандыкуль, romanized: pik Tandykulj, pronounced [pʲik təndɨˈkulʲ]; Kyrgyz: Тамдыкул чокусу, romanized: Tamdykul chokusu, pronounced [tʰɑmtɯq͡χʊ́ɫ t͡ɕʰoq͡χʊ̆sʊ́]) is a mountain in the Alay Mountains of Central Asia. Tandykul has an elevation of 5,544 metres (18,189 ft) and is located on the international border between Kyrgyzstan and Tajikistan.

== See also ==
- List of Ultras of Central Asia
