= Kum-Shoro =

Kum-Shoro Kyrgyz: Кум-Шоро
- Location within Kyrgyzstan
- Coordinates: 40°18′N 73°33′E
- Country: Kyrgyzstan
- Region: Osh Region
- District: Alay District

Population (2021)
  - Total: 819

Kum-Shoro (Kyrgyz: Кум-Шоро) is a village in the Osh Region of Kyrgyzstan. Its population was 819 in 2021.
