= Chong-Karakol =

Chong-Karakol Kyrgyz: Чоң-Каракол
- Location within Kyrgyzstan
- Coordinates: 39°53′0″N 73°19′30″E
- Country: Kyrgyzstan
- Region: Osh Region
- District: Alay District
- Elevation: 2,679 m (8,789 ft)

Population (2021)
  - Total: 1,812
- Time zone: UTC+6

Chong-Karakol (Kyrgyz: Чоң-Каракол) is a village in Osh Region of Kyrgyzstan. It is part of the Alay District. Its population was 1,812 in 2021.

Nearby villages include Kichi-Karakol, Ak-Bosogo and Chiy-Talaa.
