= European route E006 =

Road in trans-European E-road network

E006

Route information
- Length: 300 km (190 mi)

Major junctions
- From: Ayni
- To: Kokand

Location
- Countries: Tajikistan; Uzbekistan

Highway system
- International E-road network; A Class; B Class

E 006 is a European B class road in Tajikistan and Uzbekistan, connecting the cities Ayni – Kokand. Since European routes are not signposted in Tajikistan and Uzbekistan, the E006 has never seen in a direction sign in any form.

== Route ==
- Tajikistan
  - РБ01 РБ01 Road: Ayni (E 123) - Dehmoy - Khujand
  - РБ14 РБ14 Road: Dehmoy - Ghafurov - Konibodom - Border of Uzbekistan
- Uzbekistan
  - A376 Border of Tajikistan - Kokand (E 007)
