= Oktyabr, Alay =

Oktyabr Kyrgyz: Октябрь
- Location within Kyrgyzstan
- Coordinates: 40°15′40″N 73°35′0″E
- Country: Kyrgyzstan
- Region: Osh Region
- District: Alay District

Population (2021)
  - Total: 1,080
- Time zone: UTC+6

Oktyabr (Kyrgyz: Октябрь) is a village in Osh Region of Kyrgyzstan. It is part of the Alay District. Its population was 1,080 in 2021.
