= Arpa-Tektir =

Arpa-Tektir Kyrgyz: Арпа-Тектир
- Location within Kyrgyzstan
- Coordinates: 40°21′36″N 73°24′0″E
- Country: Kyrgyzstan
- Region: Osh Region
- District: Alay District
- Elevation: 1,499 m (4,918 ft)

Population (2021)
  - Total: 2,389
- Time zone: UTC+6

Arpa-Tektir (Kyrgyz: Арпа-Тектир, romanized: Arpa-Tektir) is a village in Osh Region of Kyrgyzstan. It is part of the Alay District. Its population was 2,389 in 2021.
