= Sopu-Korgon =

Sopu-Korgon Kyrgyz: Сопу-Коргон
- Location within Kyrgyzstan
- Coordinates: 40°01′48″N 73°30′00″E
- Country: Kyrgyzstan
- Region: Osh Region
- District: Alay District
- Elevation: 2,051 m (6,729 ft)

Population (2021)
  - Total: 3,232
- Time zone: UTC+6

Sopu-Korgon (Kyrgyz: Сопу-Коргон) is a village in Alay District of Osh Region of Kyrgyzstan. Its population was 3,232 in 2021.

Nearby villages include Terek (5 km or 3 mi) and Jergetal (6 km or 4 mi).
