= Kyzylart Pass =

Mountain pass between Kyrgyzstan and Tajikistan

- Kyrgyz: Кызыл-Арт ашуусу
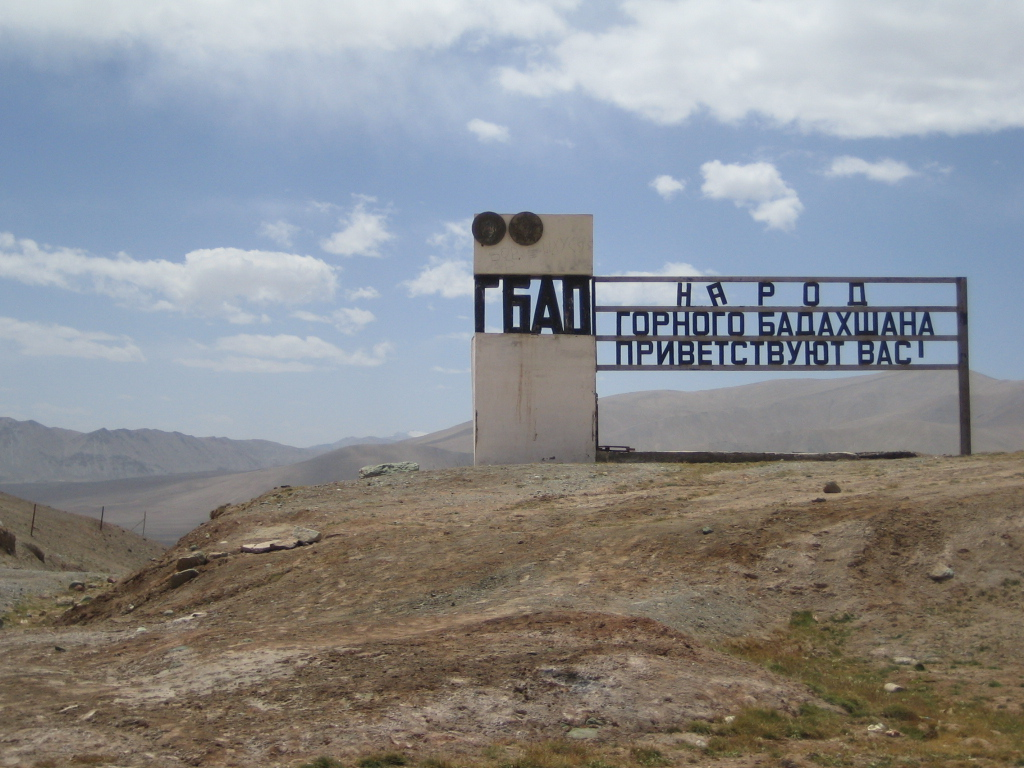

- Location within Kyrgyzstan
- Elevation: 4,280 metres (14,040 ft)

Third Approach
- Location: Kyrgyzstan–Tajikistan border
- Range: Trans-Alay Range
- Coordinates: 39°23′03.60″N 73°19′21″E

Kyzylart Pass (Russian: Кызыл-Арт; Kyrgyz: Кызыл-Арт ашуусу) is a mountain pass and border crossing in the Trans-Alay Range on the border of Tajikistan and Kyrgyzstan. The highest point is 4,280 m (14,042 ft). The border checkpoint on the Kyrgyz side is Bor-Döbö. The area is typically rugged and dry. It is crossed by the Pamir Highway which leads south from Sary-Tash in the Alay Valley up onto the Pamir plateau toward Karakol Lake and Murghab, Tajikistan. In the late nineteenth century the Russians explored and eventually occupied the Pamir plateau.

== Gallery ==
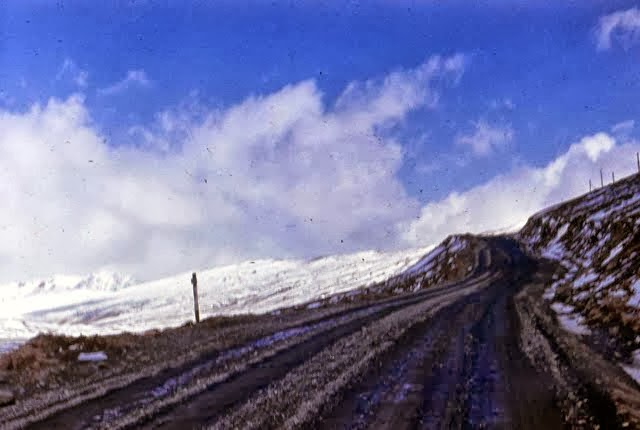
Ascent to the pass

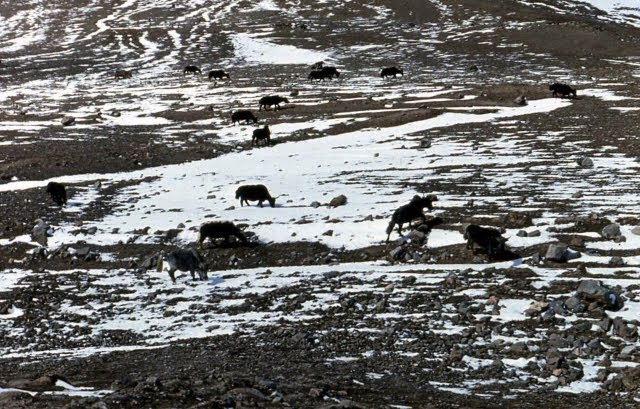
Yaki on the pass

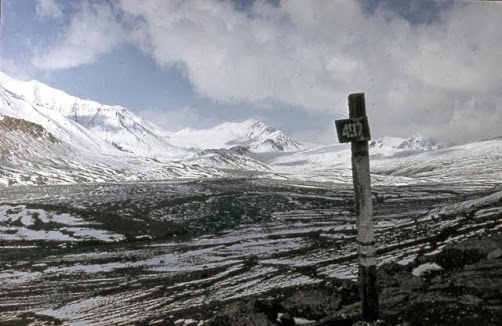
Kilometers on the pass

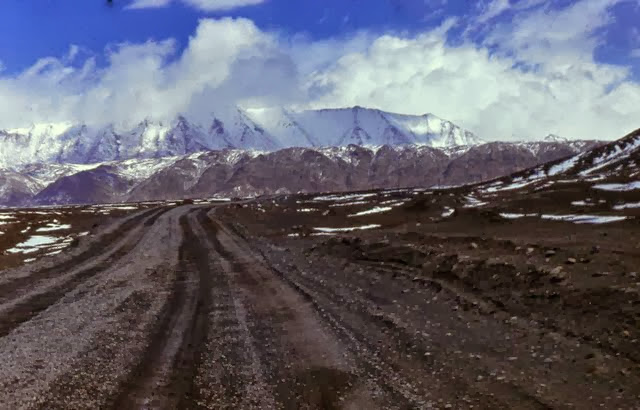
Pamir Highway near the Kyzyl Art Pass
