= Trans-Alay Range =

Mountain range in the Pamir mountains, Tajikistan

- Tajik: қаторкӯҳи Паси Олой; Kyrgyz: Чоң Алай кырка тоосу Russian: Заалайский хребет
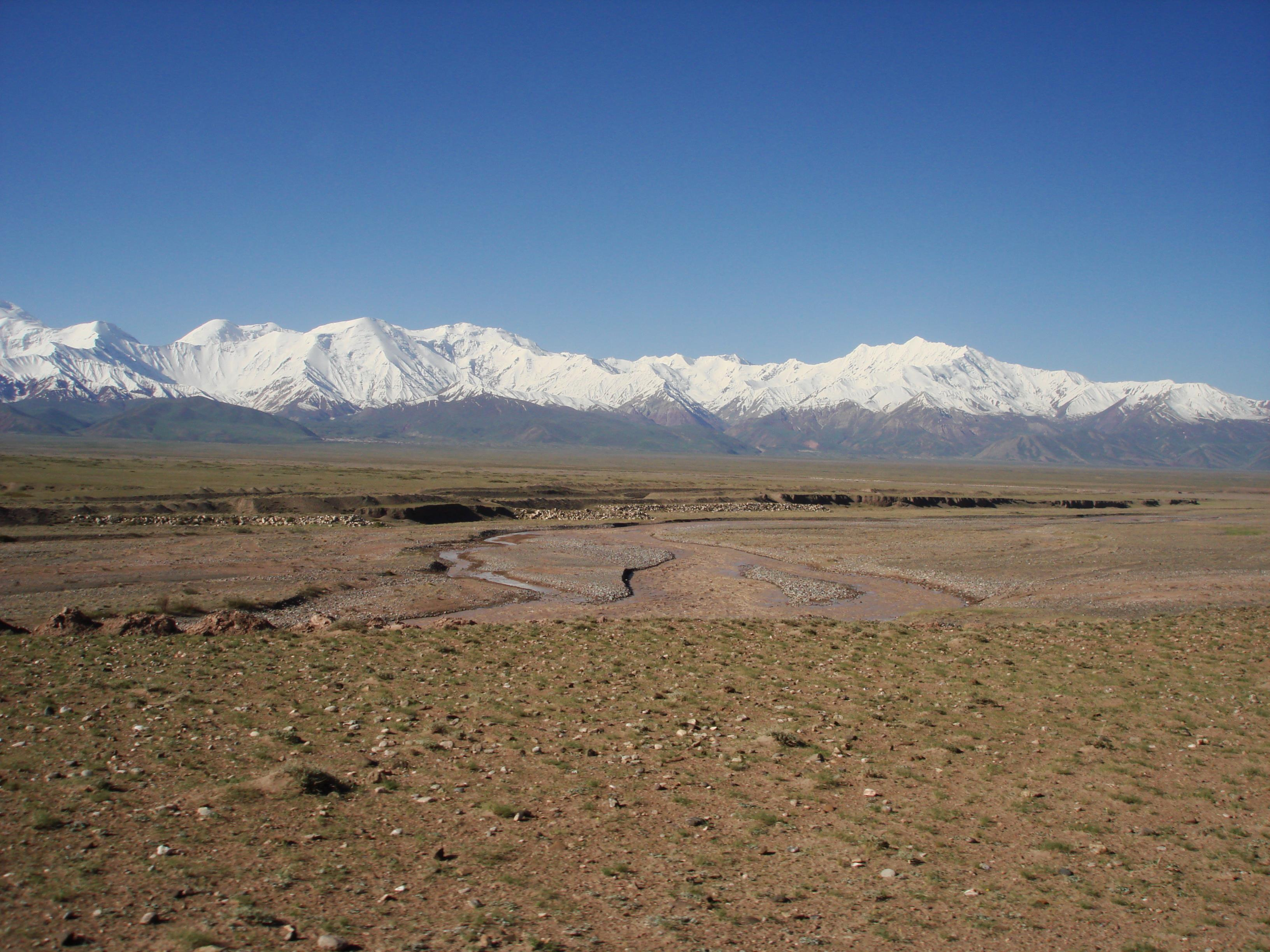
- Trans-Alay Range and Alay Valley

Highest point
- Peak: Ibn Sina/Lenin Peak
- Elevation: 7,134 m (23,406 ft)
- Coordinates: 39°20′00″N 72°55′00″E

Dimensions
- Length: 250 km (160 mi) E-W
- Width: 40 km (25 mi) N-S

Naming
- Language of name: en

Geography
- Location within Tajikistan
- Countries: Kyrgyzstan, Tajikistan
- Region(s): Osh Province, Gorno-Badakshan

Geology
- Rock age(s): Paleozoic and Mesozoic
- Rock type(s): Limestone and schist

The Trans-Alay or Trans-Alai Range (Kyrgyz: Чоң Алай кырка тоосу, Chong Alay kyrka toosu; Tajik: қаторкӯҳи Паси Олой, qatorkŭhi Pasi Oloy, or қаторкӯҳи Каюмарс, qatorkŭhi Kayumars; Russian: Заалайский хребет, Zaalaisky Khrebet) is the northernmost range of the Pamir Mountain System. Following the dissolution of the Soviet Union, the range has been divided between Tajikistan and Kyrgyzstan.

== Geography ==
The Trans-Alay is located in the area where the Pamirs and the Tian Shan come together. This heavily glaciated range forms the border between the Gorno-Badakshan region in Tajikistan and the Osh Region, Kyrgyzstan, stretching eastwards until the border with China. The name was from the viewpoint of Russian explorers in the region: the Alay Range lies to the north of the Alay Valley, formed by the Kyzyl-Suu or upper Vakhsh River, one of the principal tributaries of the Amu Darya. The range on the far side of the valley, more distant from Russia and its outposts, became known as the Trans-Alay. The southern valley dividing the Trans-Alay from the Pamir proper is that of the river Muksu.

=== Peaks ===
The highest peak in the range is the 7,134-metre-high (23,406 ft) Ibn Sina/Lenin Peak. The Kyzylart and Ters-Agar mountain passes geographically divide the range into three parts: the western, with highest peak Sat Peak (5,900 m; 19,400 ft); the central, with some of the highest summits, including Lenin Peak, Dzerzhinsky Peak (6,717 m; 22,037 ft), Oktyabrsy Peak (6,780 m; 22,240 ft), and Marshal Zhukov Peak (6,842 m; 22,448 ft); and the eastern, with highest peak the Kurumdy I summit (6,614 m; 21,699 ft).

== See also ==
- List of mountains in Tajikistan
