= Ohangaron =

- City
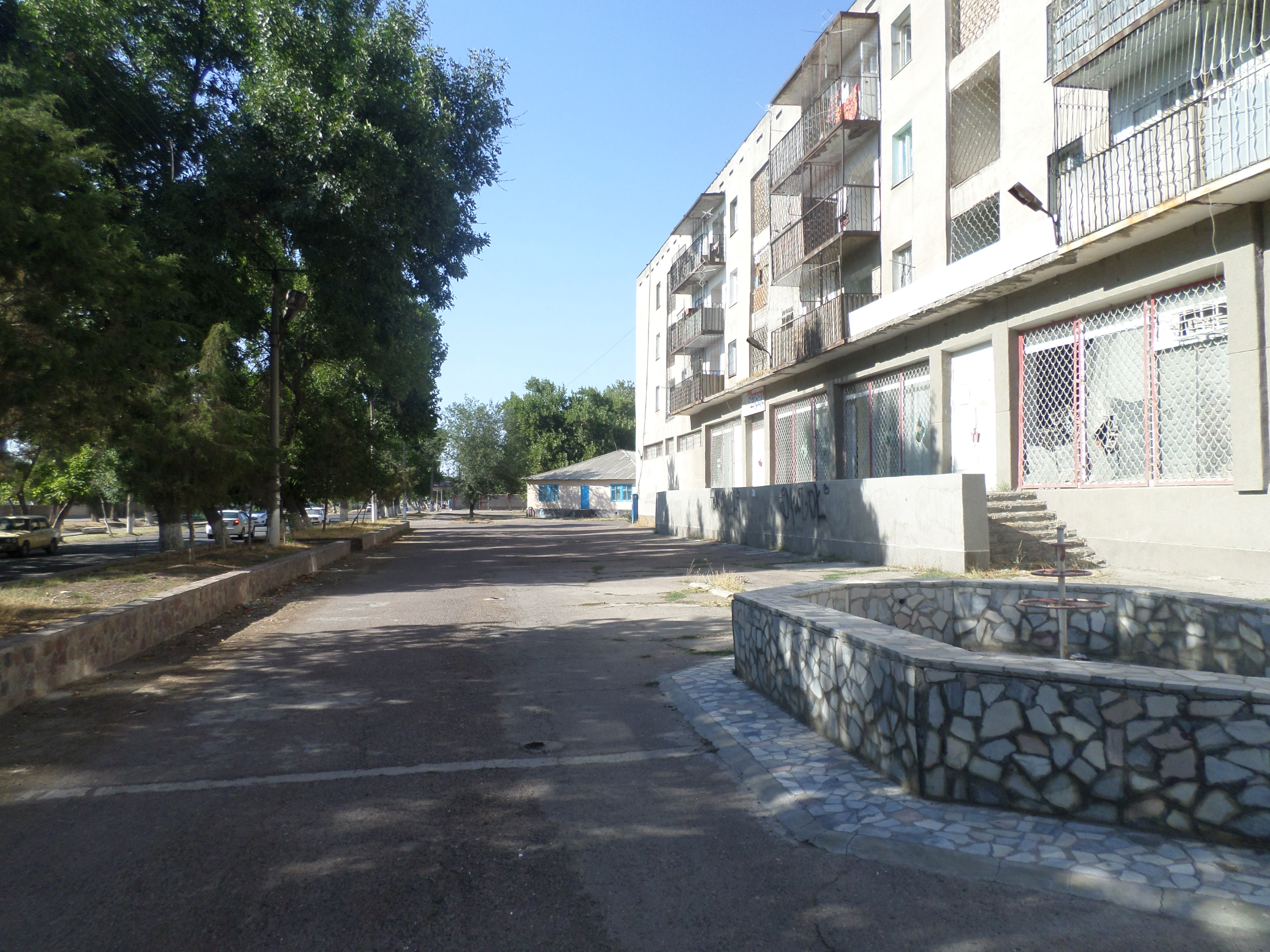

- Location in Uzbekistan
- Coordinates: 40°54′22″N 69°38′40″E
- Country: Uzbekistan
- Region: Tashkent Region
- District: Ohangaron District
- Town status: 1966

Population (2020)
  - Total: 37,784
- Time zone: UTC+5 (UZT)

Ohangaron (Uzbek: Ohangaron/Оҳaнгарон, Persian: آهنگران) is a district-level city in Tashkent Region, Uzbekistan. It is the administrative center of Ohangaron District, but not part of it.
