= Jerge-Tal, Osh =

Jerge-Tal Kyrgyz: Жерге-Тал
- Location within Kyrgyzstan
- Coordinates: 39°58′40″N 73°29′10″E
- Country: Kyrgyzstan
- Region: Osh Region
- District: Alay District
- Elevation: 2,176 m (7,139 ft)

Population (2021)
  - Total: 712
- Time zone: UTC+6

Jerge-Tal (Kyrgyz: Жерге-Тал) is a village in Osh Region of Kyrgyzstan. It is part of the Alay District. Its population was 712 in 2021.

Nearby villages include Sopu-Korgon, Chiy-Talaa and Kichi-Karakol.
