= Kichi-Bülölü =

Kichi-Bülölü Kyrgyz: Кичи-Бүлөлү
- Location within Kyrgyzstan
- Coordinates: 40°10′48″N 73°36′0″E
- Country: Kyrgyzstan
- Region: Osh Region
- District: Alay District
- Elevation: 2,221 m (7,287 ft)

Population (2021)
  - Total: 920
- Time zone: UTC+6

Kichi-Bülölü (Kyrgyz: Кичи-Бүлөлү) is a village in Osh Region of Kyrgyzstan. It is part of the Alay District. Its population was 920 in 2021.
