= Sary-Tash =

Sary-Tash Сары-Таш (Kyrgyz)
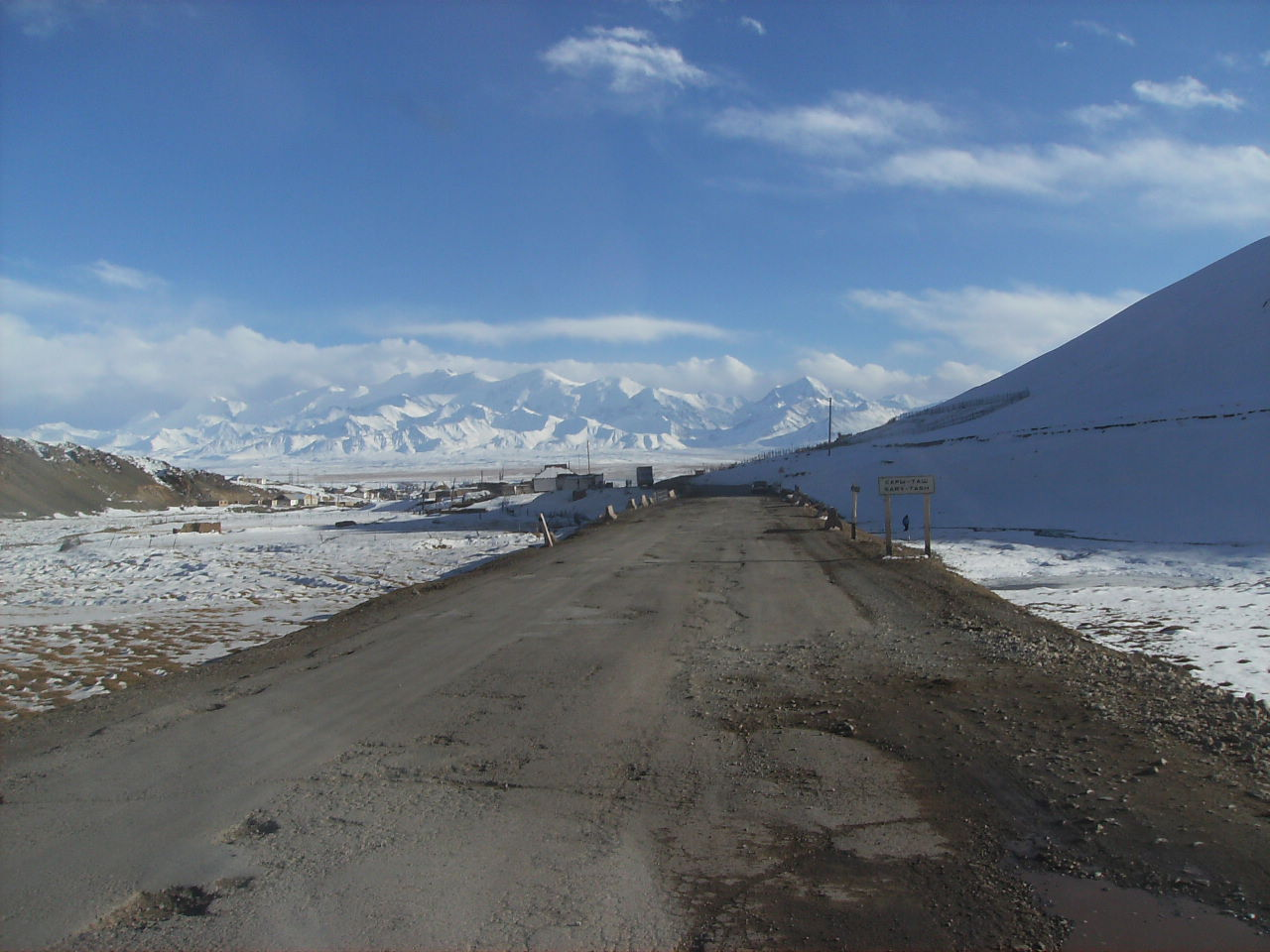
- Sary Tash village with the Pamir Mountains

- Location within Kyrgyzstan
- Coordinates: 39°43′48″N 73°15′00″E
- Country: Kyrgyzstan
- Region: Osh Region
- District: Alay District
- Established: 1950
- Elevation: 3,170 m (10,400 ft)

Population (2021)
  - Total: 2,337
- Time zone: UTC+6 (KGT)

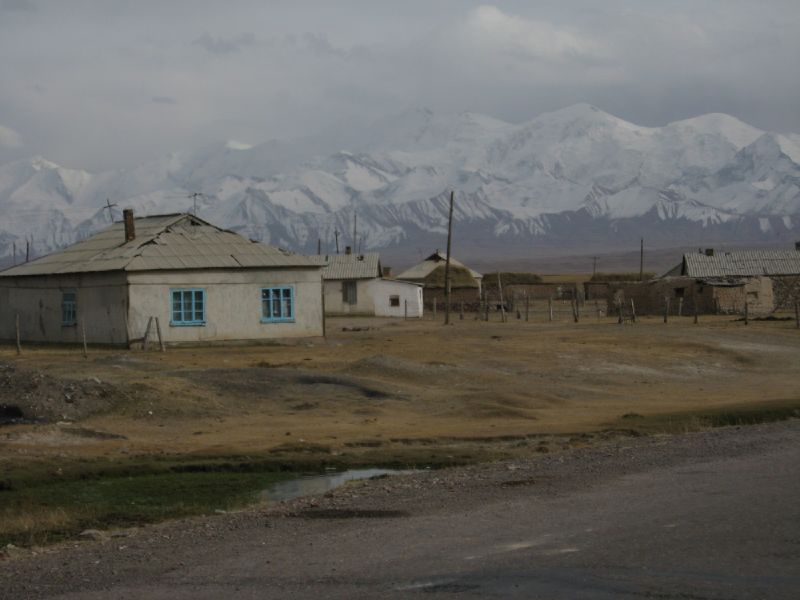
Houses in Sary Tash

Sary-Tash (Kyrgyz: Сары-Таш, romanized: Sarı-Taş) is a village and major crossroads in the Alay Valley of Osh Region, Kyrgyzstan. Its population was 2,337 in 2021. Until 2012 it was an urban-type settlement. Nearby towns and villages to the north include Ak-Bosogo (8 km or 5 mi) and Chagyr (14 km or 9 mi).

Although this remote village has only some shop-cafes, a petrol station and five guest houses (March 2016), it is an important road junction connecting China, Kyrgyzstan and Tajikistan. Its name is derived from Turkic roots and means "yellow-stone".

To the north, M41 goes over the Taldyk Pass to Gülchö and Osh in the Ferghana Valley. To the south, after leaving the Alay Valley the M41 rises to the 4280m Kyzylart Pass into Tajikistan as part of the Pamir Highway. 80 kilometres (50 miles) to the east on A371 is the Irkestam pass to Kashgar, Xinjiang province, China. To the west, the A372 leads down the Alay Valley. The pass at the west end (towards Dushanbe, Tajikistan) is a bilateral border crossing closed to foreigners.

== Population ==
Historical population
Year	Pop.	±% p.a.
1970	870	—
1979	1,072	+2.35%
1989	1,278	+1.77%
1999	1,502	+1.63%
2009	1,427	−0.51%
2021	2,337	+4.20%
Note: resident population; Sources:

== History ==
Sary-Tash was visited in 1894 by Swedish traveller Sven Hedin, who wrote his caravan before his mountaineering ascent "fell on their knees in the snow, offering Allah a prayer for a happy pass through the dangerous Kyzyl-Art, where sudden disastrous storms often occur." Exploring the pass, he saw a pile of stones piled in a heap, decorated with "tutami", a type of poles, which were hung with fur pendants, colorful rags of fabric, horns of mountain goats and rams.

== Climate ==
Climate data for Sary-Tash (1991–2020)
Month	Jan	Feb	Mar	Apr	May	Jun	Jul	Aug	Sep	Oct	Nov	Dec	Year
Daily mean °C (°F)	−15.5 (4.1)	−13.5 (7.7)	−7.9 (17.8)	−0.8 (30.6)	4.2 (39.6)	7.5 (45.5)	10.2 (50.4)	10.1 (50.2)	6.3 (43.3)	−0.3 (31.5)	−7.3 (18.9)	−13.3 (8.1)	−1.7 (29.0)
Source: NOAA
