= Chiy-Talaa =

Chiy-Talaa Kyrgyz: Чий-Талаа
- Location within Kyrgyzstan
- Coordinates: 39°57′N 73°30′E
- Country: Kyrgyzstan
- Region: Osh Region
- District: Alay District
- Elevation: 2,356 m (7,730 ft)

Population (2021)
  - Total: 2,114
- Time zone: UTC+6

Chiy-Talaa (Kyrgyz: Чий-Талаа) is a village in Osh Region of Kyrgyzstan. It is part of the Alay District. Its population was 2,114 in 2021.

Nearby towns and villages include Kichi-Karakol (6 km or 4 mi) and Jerge-Tal (3 km or 2 mi).
