= Kichi-Karakol =

Kichi-Karakol Kyrgyz: Кичи-Каракол
- Location within Kyrgyzstan
- Coordinates: 39°54′0″N 73°25′0″E
- Country: Kyrgyzstan
- Region: Osh Region
- District: Alay District
- Elevation: 2,679 m (8,789 ft)

Population (2021)
  - Total: 2,039
- Time zone: UTC+6

Kichi-Karakol (Kyrgyz: Кичи-Каракол) is a village in Osh Region of Kyrgyzstan. It is part of the Alay District. Its population was 2,039 in 2021.

Nearby villages include Chong-Karakol, Jerge-Tal and Chiy-Talaa.
