= European route E008 =

Road in trans-European E-road network

E008

Route information
- Length: 1,009 km (627 mi)

Major junctions
- West end: Dushanbe
- East end: border of China

Location
- Countries: Tajikistan

Highway system
- International E-road network; A Class; B Class

E 008 is a European B class road in Tajikistan, from Dushanbe to the border of China. The border is located at the Kulma Pass, at an elevation of 4,362 metres (14,311 ft), the highest elevation of any E-route.

== Route ==
- Tajikistan
  - РБ04 РБ04 Road: Dushanbe - Vahdat - Kulob - Khorugh (E 009) - Murghob - Kulma - Border of China

== Lack of signage ==
E 008 has never been signposted on any direction sign and it remains signed only as РБ04, as Tajikistani authorities never implemented any European route number signage. While Turkey, Kazakhstan and Russia signpost European route numbers, this is not the case in many Asian countries, including Tajikistan.
