= Bronislav Grombchevsky =

Bronislav Ludwigovich Grombchevsky Бронислав Людвигович Громбчевский
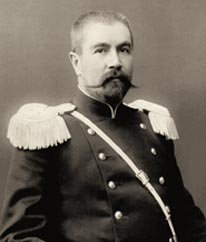
- Bronislav L. Grombchevsky
- Born: 15 January 1855; Kaunatava, Kovno Governorate, Russian Empire
- Died: 27 February 1926 (aged 71); Warsaw
- Occupations: Russian Army officer, explorer
- Awards: gold and silver stars of Russian Geographic Society

Academic background
- Education: Saint Petersburg Mining Institute

Bronislav Ludwigovich Grombchevsky (Russian: Бронислав Людвигович Громбчевский, Polish: Bronisław Grąbczewski; 1855–1926) was an ethnic Polish officer in the Imperial Russian Army and an explorer and spy, famed for his participation in "The Great Game", the rivalry between the British Empire and the Russian Empire in Asia.

Grombchevsky traveled extensively in the Far East and Central Asia during the period from 1888 to 1892. He is regarded as the Russian counterpart to the British military-explorer Francis Younghusband. The two Great Game rivals famously met in 1889 when they were exploring the Raskam Valley for their respective governments.

His name also appears in English as "Gromtchevsky" and "Gromchevsky".

== Career ==
=== Early years 1855–85 ===
Grombchevsky was born on 15 January 1855, in the family mansion in Kaunatava in the Kovno Governorate of the Russian Empire (now Lithuania). His father, Louis Grąbczewski, partook in the Polish uprising of 1863 and was sent to Siberia, while his estate and property were confiscated. Therefore, his mother and other relatives moved to Warsaw, where Grombchevsky entered a Russian classical school.

In 1873 Grombchevsky entered the Saint Petersburg Mining Institute but left before completing his studies to join the Life Grenadier Regiment of the Imperial Russian Guard at Kexholm. He took leave to attend infantry school in Warsaw and returned to the regiment with the rank of Praporshchik. Unable to maintain payments of an annual fee to remain in the Guard, he joined the Army Corps in March 1876 and was transferred to the 14th Battalion on the Turkestan line, then headquarters of the Turkestan Military District. There, Grombchevsky served as orderly to General Mikhail Dmitrievich Skobelev and participated in the general's campaigns. During this time, he learned the Uzbek, Tajik, and Persian languages, which later helped him on his expeditions in Central Asia.

=== Expeditions 1885–1892 ===
In 1885, as a senior officer for special assignments in military governor of Fergana, Grombchevsky led an expedition along the Chinese border in Kashgar and the border areas of the Tian Shan mountains. In 1886 he led another in the Central Tian Shan Basin and Naryn (upper reaches of the river Syr Darya). For these expeditions, he was awarded a silver medal by the Russian Geographical Society.

Grombchevsky then entered the astronomical faculty of St. Petersburg University, where he received theoretical and practical skills in surveying, geodesy, and cartography, after which he returned to Turkestan.

In 1888 he led an expedition from Margilan through passages in the Pamirs along the Gilgit River (a tributary of the Indus). On the way back explore the Muztagh Ata Peak (7,548 m) and left tributaries of the Raskemdarya river, which becomes the Yarkand river lower down and flows into the Tarim Basin.

In 1889 he returned to the Raskemdarya basin. He explored the Raskem (6,482 m) and Tohtakorum (5,419 m) ranges and the Kirchinbulak river (left tributary of the Raskemdarya). He reached the foot of Chogori (K2) and the northern ridge of Agil-Karakorum (7,693 m). By late November, he found the sources of the Tizinafu River (right tributary of the Yarkand River). In December, he followed the Karakash (part of Hotan) into Tibet to Karangutag (7,160 m) between the Black Jade River and White Jade River in Hotan. In the spring of 1890, he climbed along the Kerry and to Ustyuntag (6,920 m) and along the Liushi Shan (7,160 m).

In 1892 he took part in the military expedition to the Pamir under a Major-General Mikhail Ionov.

In 1893 Grombchevsky was promoted to colonel. For his expeditions (1888–1892), he was awarded a gold medal by the Russian Geographical Society.

=== Later years 1893–1926 ===
In 1900 Grombchevski became a major general and civil commissioner of Kwantung province in China. He then served as its governor (1903–1905) and managed the Astrakhan Ataman of Astrakhan Cossack army (1905–1907). He represented the Russian "Red Cross" in Morocco during the war between Spain and France with local insurgents (1908–1909).

During the revolution he lost all his property, was imprisoned in Siberia and escaped via Japan to Poland.

Finally, he returned to Poland, where he worked in the State Institute of Meteorology and wrote many books about his travels in Central Asia.

== Death ==
Grombchevsky died in Warsaw on 27 February 1926, at the age of 71 years

== Transliteration ==
Francis Younghusband wrote his name "Gromtchevsky" and Peter Hopkirk spelled it "Gromchevsky."

== Works ==
- Report on Kashgar and Yuzhnu Kashgar (1887)
- The current political situation in the Pamir khanates and the border line in Kashmir (1891)
- Our interest in the Pamirs: A Military-Political Essay (1891)
- Kashgar (1924)
- Through the Pamirs and Hindu Kush to the Sources of the Indus (1925)
- In the Deserts of Raskem and Tibet (1925)
- In the Russian Service (1926)
- Traveling in Central Asia (1958)

== See also ==
- The Great Game
- Francis Younghusband
- Russian Geographic Society
- Imperial Russian Army

== Sources ==
- Holdich, Thomas Hungerford (1911). "Pamirs" . Encyclopædia Britannica. Vol. 20 (11th ed.). pp. 655–657.
- Peter Hopkirk. The Great Game: The Struggle for Empire in Central Asia, Kodansha International, 1992, ISBN 4-7700-1703-0, 565p.
