= Gülchö =

Town in Osh Region, Kyrgyzstan

Gülchö Kyrgyz: Гүлчө
- Location within Kyrgyzstan
- Coordinates: 40°19′N 73°26′E
- Country: Kyrgyzstan
- Region: Osh Region
- District: Alay District
- Elevation: 1,540 m (5,050 ft)

Population (2021)
  - Total: 13,755
- Time zone: UTC+6 (KGT)

Gülchö (Kyrgyz: Гүлчө; Russian: Гульча, romanized: Gulcha) is a mountain town in Osh Region of Kyrgyzstan. It is the seat of Alay District. Its population was 13,755 in 2021.

== Population ==
Historical population
Year	Pop.	±% p.a.
2009	11,691	—
2021	13,755	+1.36%
Note: resident population; Sources:

== Geography ==
The M41 highway leading south from Osh to the Alay Valley and eastern Tajikistan passes through Gülchö. The 2402m Chyrchyk Pass separates Gülchö from Osh, and the 3615m Taldyk Pass separates Gülchö from Sary-Tash in the Alay Valley. Gülchö is situated in a broad valley at the confluence of three rivers, forming the river Kurshab.

=== Climate ===
Gülchö has a hot, dry-summer continental climate (Köppen climate classification Dsa). The average annual temperature is 8.9 °C (48 °F). The warmest month is July with an average temperature of 22.3 °C (72.1 °F) and the coolest month is January with an average temperature of -7 °C (19 °F). The average annual precipitation is 501mm (19.72"). The wettest month is May with an average of 90mm (3.5") of precipitation and the driest month is September with an average of 16mm of precipitation.

Climate data for Gülchö
Month	Jan	Feb	Mar	Apr	May	Jun	Jul	Aug	Sep	Oct	Nov	Dec	Year
Mean daily maximum °C (°F)	−2.1 (28.2)	0.7 (33.3)	8.4 (47.1)	17.2 (63.0)	22.3 (72.1)	27.1 (80.8)	29.6 (85.3)	28.5 (83.3)	24.0 (75.2)	16.6 (61.9)	7.7 (45.9)	0.3 (32.5)	15.0 (59.1)
Daily mean °C (°F)	−7.0 (19.4)	−4.2 (24.4)	3.4 (38.1)	11.2 (52.2)	15.9 (60.6)	20.0 (68.0)	22.3 (72.1)	21.0 (69.8)	16.3 (61.3)	9.7 (49.5)	2.3 (36.1)	−4.0 (24.8)	8.9 (48.0)
Mean daily minimum °C (°F)	−11.8 (10.8)	−9.1 (15.6)	−1.6 (29.1)	5.3 (41.5)	9.6 (49.3)	12.9 (55.2)	15.0 (59.0)	13.6 (56.5)	8.7 (47.7)	2.9 (37.2)	−3.1 (26.4)	−8.3 (17.1)	2.8 (37.1)
Average precipitation mm (inches)	26 (1.0)	34 (1.3)	52 (2.0)	74 (2.9)	90 (3.5)	55 (2.2)	40 (1.6)	17 (0.7)	16 (0.6)	42 (1.7)	31 (1.2)	24 (0.9)	501 (19.7)
Source: "Climate: Gul'cha". Climate Data.
