= Töömoyun =

Mountain in Kyrgyzstan

- Location within Kyrgyzstan

Highest point
- Elevation: 1,403 m (4,603 ft)
- Coordinates: 40°21′21″N 72°35′56″E

Geography
- Location: Kyrgyzstan

Töömoyun (Kyrgyz: Төөмоюн, Russian: Туя-Муюн, romanized: Tuya-Moyun) is a mountain in the western part of the Osh Region of Kyrgyzstan. Situated near the left bank of the river Aravansay, its elevation is 1,403 m (4,603 ft). It is near the village Kara-Koktu, between Nookat and Aravan. There are several karst caves on the slopes of the mountain, including Ajydaar-Üngkür, the Baryte Cave and the Fersman Cave.
