= Bel, Osh =

Bel Бел
- Location within Kyrgyzstan
- Coordinates: 40°16′10″N 72°28′0″E
- Country: Kyrgyzstan
- Region: Osh Region
- District: Nookat District

Population (2021)
  - Total: 4,550
- Time zone: UTC+6

Bel is a village in Osh Region of Kyrgyzstan. It is part of the Nookat District. Its population was 4,550 in 2021.

Nearby towns and villages include Jiyde (1.3 nm), Jangy-Nookat (5.0 nm) and Chapaev (7.9 nm).
