= Aravansay =

River in Kyrgyzstan and Uzbekistan

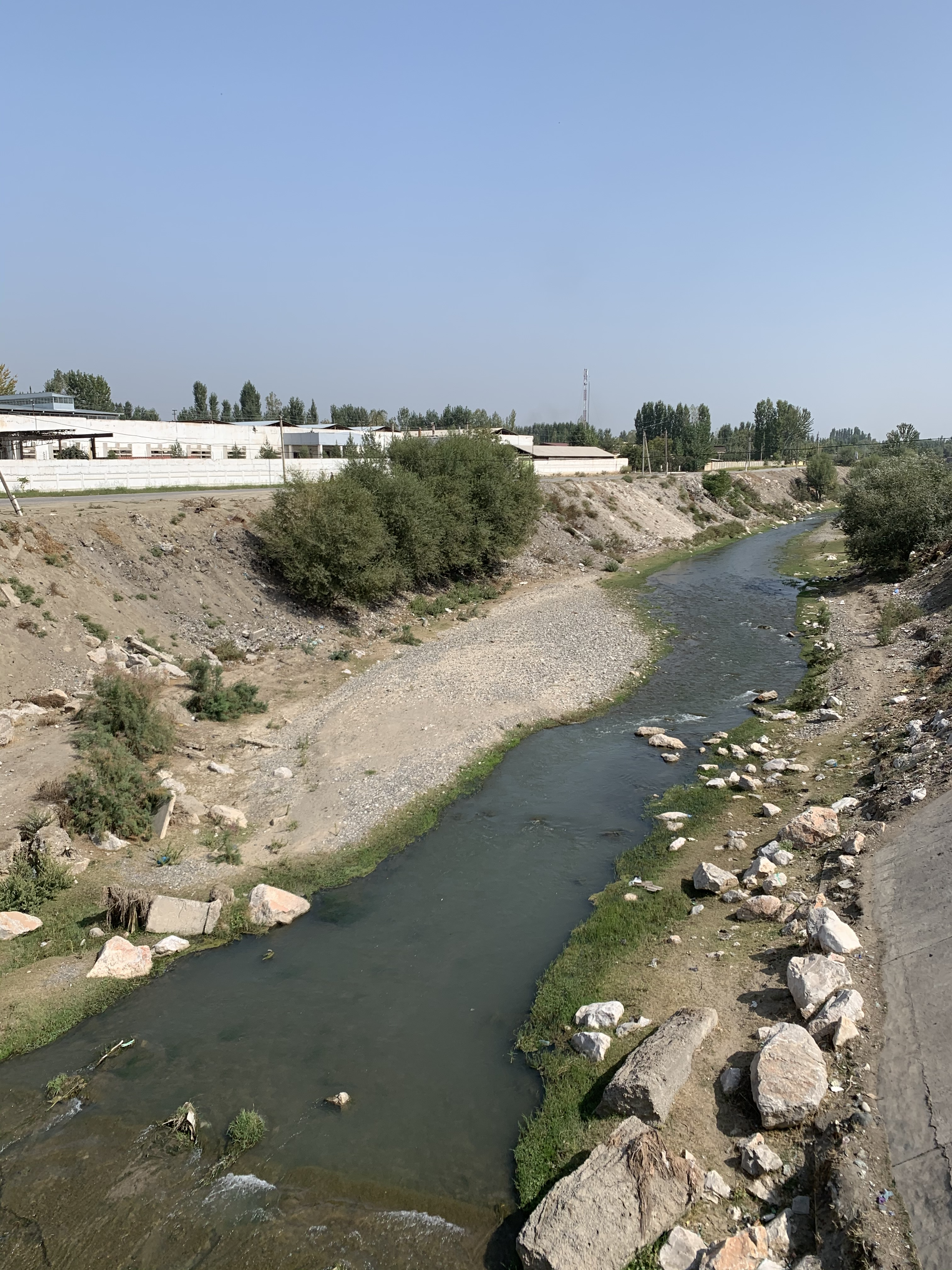

- Location within Kyrgyzstan

Location
- Country: Kyrgyzstan, Uzbekistan

Physical characteristics
- Source: Kichi-Alay range, Alay Range
- Mouth: Shahrixonsoy
  - coordinates: 40°37′07″N 72°21′39″E
- Length: 102 km (63 mi)
- Basin size: 1,960 km^{2} (760 sq mi)

Basin features
- Progression: Shahrixonsoy → Great Fergana Canal → Syr Darya→ North Aral Sea

The Aravansay (Kyrgyz: Аравансай, Uzbek: Aravonsoy) is a river in Kyrgyzstan and Uzbekistan. It rises in the Kichi-Alay range, part of the Alay Range, and flows towards the Fergana Valley, where it enters the Shahrixonsoy canal. The river is 102 km (63 mi) long and has a drainage basin of 1,960 km^{2} (760 sq mi).

== Course ==
The river's headwaters rise on the northern slopes of the Kichi-Alay range. Its course passes through Nookat and Aravan districts of Osh Region. In its upper course, the river is known as the Gezart, and in its middle course as the Chilisay. The principal settlements along it include Jangy-Nookat and Aravan. Near Kara-Koktu, it passes through Dangi Canyon.

The Aravansay formerly reached the Kara Darya. By 1987, its waters were reported to be entirely diverted for irrigation before reaching that river.

== Tributaries ==
Major tributaries include the Kyrgyzata, Koschan, Agart and Akdöbö. Other tributaries recorded in the basin include the Karagoy, Chachme and Karakol.

== Hydrology ==
The river is 102 km (63 mi) long, and its drainage basin covers 1,960 km^{2} (760 sq mi). It is fed mainly by melting snow and glaciers. Its seasonal flow regime is classified as being of the Tian Shan type.

High water begins in April, with elevated flows from May to July and seasonal peaks in June and July. At the Kara-Kol gauging station, which has an upstream drainage area of 1,680 km^{2} (650 sq mi), the maximum discharge listed in the Ministry of Emergency Situations' 2026 report is 86.7 m^{3}/s (3,060 cu ft/s), recorded in April 1941.

== Natural hazards ==
Flood flows can erode the river's banks and damage protective embankments. Near the villages of Arap and Chertik in Aravan District, erosion of the left bank damaged approximately 16 ha (40 acres) of adjacent land, according to an August 2026 report by the Ministry of Emergency Situations. Bank protection works reinforced 530 m (1,740 ft) of embankment in 2025, with work on a further 1,005 m (3,297 ft) underway in 2026.
