= Jangy-Aryk =

Jangy-Aryk may refer to the following places in Kyrgyzstan:

- Jangy-Aryk, Aravan, a village in Aravan District, Osh Region
- Jangy-Aryk, Kara-Suu, a village in Kara-Suu District, Osh Region
- Jangy-Aryk, Nooken, a village in Nooken District, Jalal-Abad Region
- Jangy-Aryk, Toktogul, a village in Toktogul District, Jalal-Abad Region
