= Dangi Canyon =

Canyon in Kyrgyzstan

Dangi Canyon Данги каньон (Kyrgyz)
- Canyon
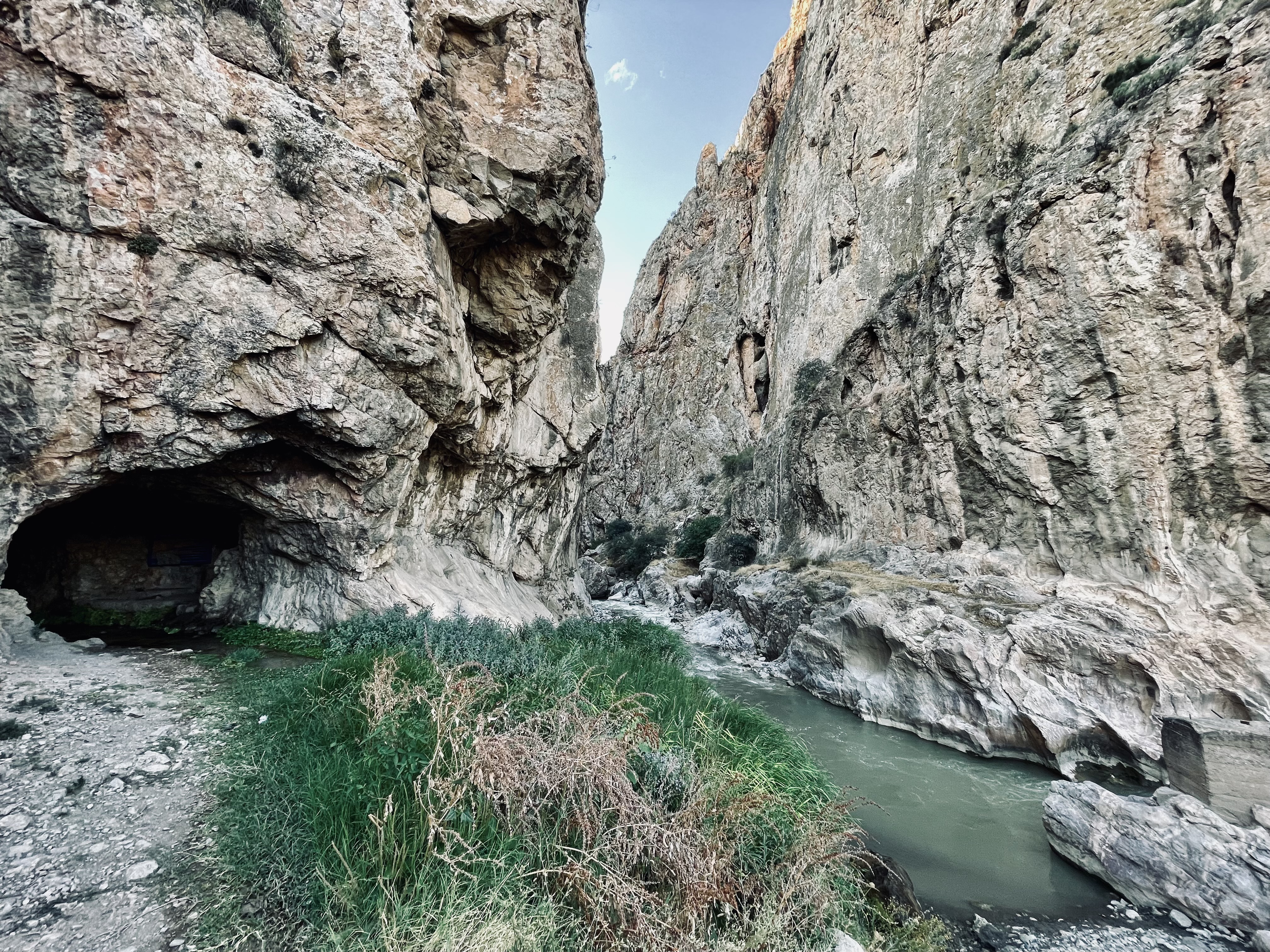

- Coordinates: 40°22′01″N 72°36′29″E
- Location: Kyrgyzstan
- Formed by: Aravansay

The Dangi Canyon (Kyrgyz: Данги каньон) is a narrow passage of the river Aravansay in the Nookat District, Osh Region of southwestern Kyrgyzstan. It is situated to the south of Aravan and to the north of Nookat. It is a natural monument and a protected area. In the canyon are a series of caves:

- Fersman cave
- Surprise cave
- Victory cave
- Ajydaar-Üngkür
- Baryte cave
