= Kara-Oy, Osh =

Kara-Oy Кара-Ой
- Location within Kyrgyzstan
- Coordinates: 40°9′30″N 72°39′0″E
- Country: Kyrgyzstan
- Region: Osh Region
- District: Nookat District

Population (2021)
  - Total: 602
- Time zone: UTC+6

Kara-Oy is a village in the Osh Region of Kyrgyzstan. It is part of the Nookat District. Its population was 602 in 2021.

Nearby villages include Ak-Bulak and Kyrgyz-Ata.
