= Alay Valley =

Valley in Central Asia

Coordinates: 39°40′N 72°58′E

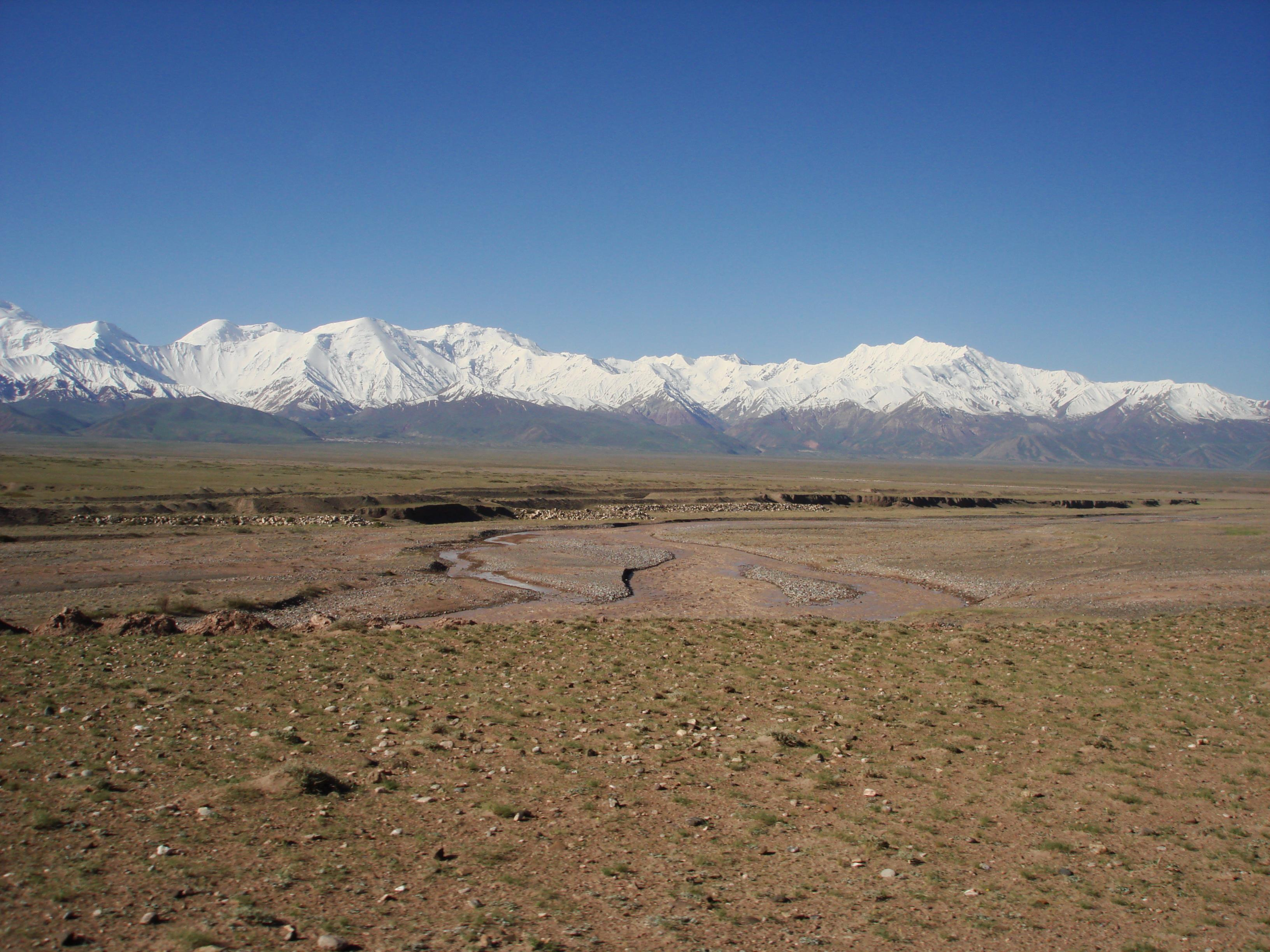
- A view of Alay Valley, Trans-Alay Range, and Kyzyl-Suu (West) River
- Length: 12 kilometres (7.5 mi) East-West
- Width: 3 to 40 kilometres (1.9 to 24.9 mi) North-South
- Area: 8,400 square kilometres (3,200 mi^{2})

Naming
- Native name: Алай өрөөнү (Kyrgyz)

Geography
- Country: Kyrgyzstan
- State/Province: Osh Region
- Interactive map of Alay Valley

The Alai Valley (Note: Kyrgyz: Алай өрөөнү, romanized: Alai öröönü, pronounced [aláɪ ɵɾɵːnʉ́]) is a broad, dry valley running east–west across most of southern Osh Region of Kyrgyzstan in Central Asia.

== Geography ==
The valley spreads over a length of 174 km (108 mi) east–west. It has a width of 27 km (17 mi) in the west, 40 km (25 mi) in the central part, and 3–7 km (1.9–4.3 mi) in the east. The altitude of the valley ranges from 2,440 m (8,010 ft) near Karamyk to 3,536 m (11,601 ft) at the Taunmurun Pass with an average altitude of about 3,000 m (9,800 ft). The area of the valley is 8,400 km^{2} (3,200 sq mi). The north side is the Alay Mountains which slope down to the Ferghana Valley. The south side is the Trans-Alay Range along the Tajikistan border, with Lenin Peak, (7,134 m or 23,406 ft). The western 40 km (25 mi) or so is more hills than valley. On the east lies the 3,536 m (11,601 ft) Taunmurun (alternative spellings Taukmurun and Tongmurun) Pass and then more valley leading to the Erkeshtam border crossing to China.

The eastern Kyzyl-Suu ('Red River') flows from the Taunmurun Pass past Erkeshtam toward Kashgar. The western Kyzyl-Suu flows west from the Taunmurun Pass and drains most of the valley, flowing on the north side. It exits through the Karamyk pass and a gorge into Tajikistan, where, under the name of the Vakhsh River it flows south-west into the Amu Darya. Highway A371 runs along the valley. The western pass to Tajikistan is closed to foreigners, but the eastern pass to China is open. A371 intersects the M41 highway north to Osh at Sary-Tash. To the south, M41 (Pamir Highway) becomes very rough and leads to the 4,280 m (14,040 ft) Kyzyl-Art pass to Murgab in Tajikistan, a route that requires considerable preparation and paperwork.

The valley has a population of approximately 17,000 and is almost entirely Kyrgyz with a few pockets of Tajik population. One traveler says "with no jobs, a harsh winter climate, and poor conditions for agriculture, life is immensely tough here, and most of the adult male population have left to seek work elsewhere."

Places in or near the valley: Irkestam, Nura, Sary-Tash, Achiktash, Lenin Peak, Sary-Mogol, Kashka-Suu, Bordobo, Kara-Kabak, Kyzyl-Eshme, Daroot-Korgon, Chak, Jar-Bashy, Karamyk, Achyk-Suu.

== Environment ==
The valley contains sagebrush and xerophilic mountain vegetation, with ephemeral vegetation at its lower levels. The upper slopes have patches of juniper and spruce forest. Bird species of interest include the snow pigeon, Barbary and Saker falcons, Himalayan vulture, plain mountain finch, white-tailed rubythroat and red-billed chough. The valley has been recognised as an Important Bird Area (IBA) by BirdLife International.

== See also ==
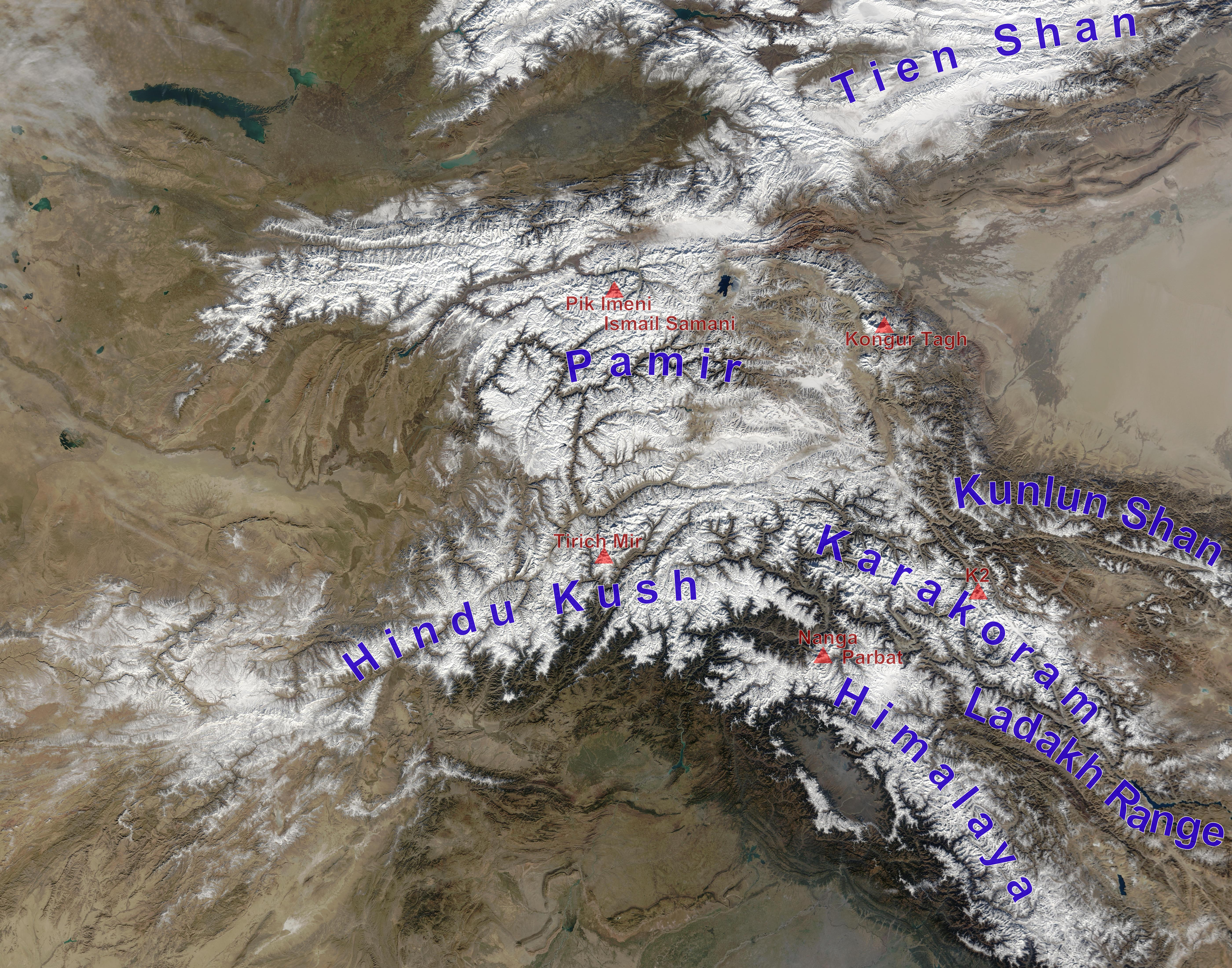
Pamir mountains from space Right: Tarim Basin Upper Left: Ferghana Valley The Alay Valley is just visible as a white line running west from the west end of the Tarim Basin

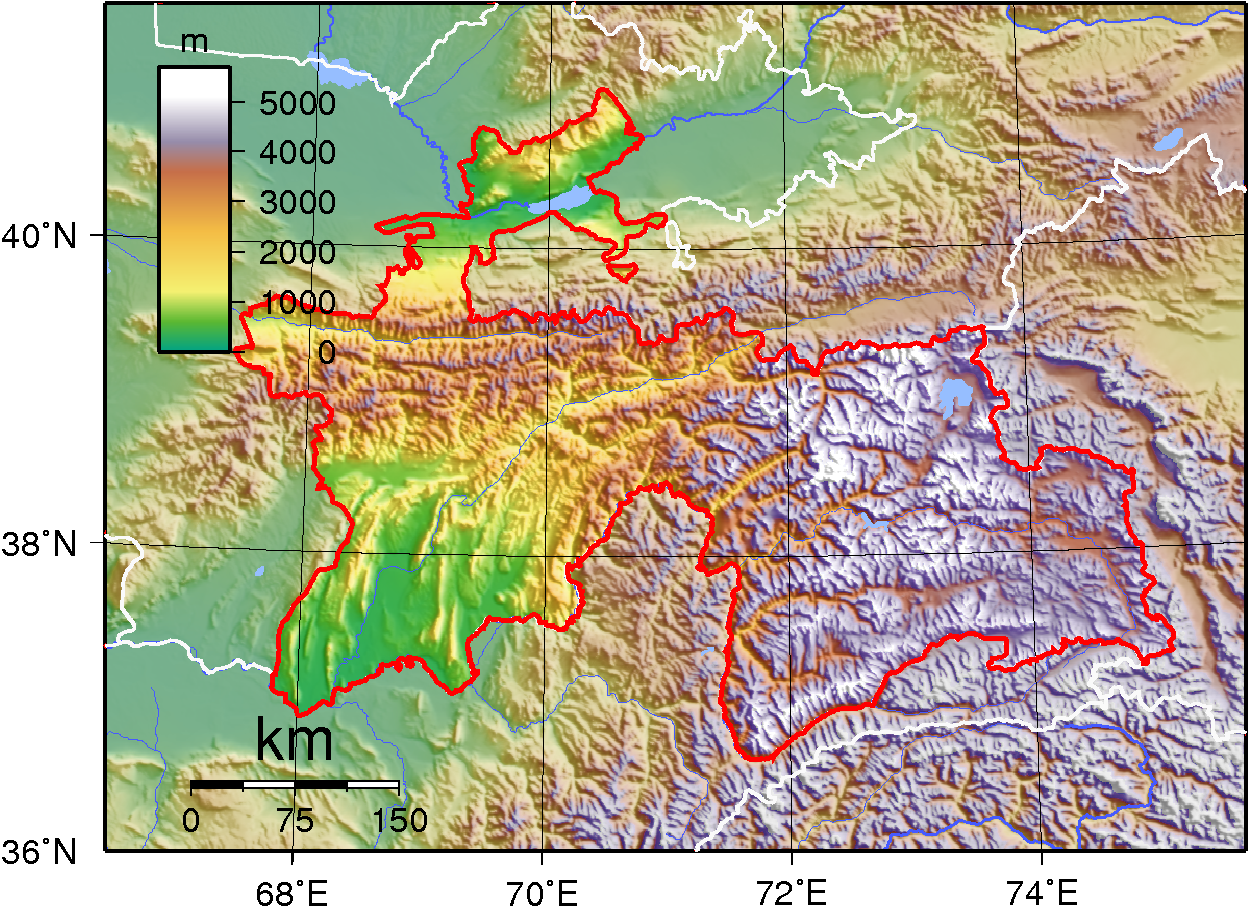
(double click) The Alay valley is between 72 and 74E at 39.5 north

The Alai Valley in Pakistan is east of Besham. The population is mostly Pathan and lived under their own nawab until the late 1970s.
