= Internatsional =

Internatsional may refer to the following places:

- in Kyrgyzstan:
  - Internatsional, Batken, a village in Leylek District, Batken Region
  - Internatsional, Jalal-Abad, a village in Nooken District, Jalal-Abad Region
  - Internatsional, Aravan, a village in Aravan District, Osh Region
  - Internatsional, Nookat, a village in Nookat District, Osh Region
- the former name of Üçüncü Beynəlmiləl, Azerbaijan
- the former name of Äitei, Almaty, Kazakhstan
