= Kyzyl-Bulak, Nookat =

Kyzyl-Bulak Кызыл-Булак
- Location within Kyrgyzstan
- Coordinates: 40°13′21″N 72°16′44″E
- Country: Kyrgyzstan
- Region: Osh Region
- District: Nookat District
- Elevation: 1,340 m (4,400 ft)

Population (2021)
  - Total: 3,576

Kyzyl-Bulak is a village in the Nookat District of Osh Region of Kyrgyzstan. Its population was 3,576 in 2021. Nearby villages include Besh-Burkan (1 mile) and Akchal (2 miles).
