= Victory cave =

Cave in Nookat District, Kyrgyzstan

The Victory cave (Kyrgyz: Жеңиш үңкүрү, romanized: Jenggish üngkürü) is situated near the Dangi Canyon in Nookat District, Kyrgyzstan, 6 km north of the town Nookat.

The Victory cave is 1,200 m (3,900 ft) long and lies further to the east along the northern slope of Koschan Mountain. It is the deepest cave in Kyrgyzstan. The crevice at the watershed of the range leads to a maze of underground passages and cavities created by the rising flow of thermal springs.
