= Tölöykön =

Tölöykön or Teleyken may refer to the following places in Kyrgyzstan:

- Tölöykön, Aravan, a village in Mangyt rural community, Aravan District, Osh Region
- Tölöykan, a village in Chek-Abad rural community, Aravan District, Osh Region
- Tölöykön, Kara-Suu, a village partly in Kara-Suu District, Osh Region, partly in the city of Osh
