= Erke (disambiguation) =

Erke is a musical instrument from the Gran Chaco of Bolivia, northern Chile

ERKE is a sportswear brand from China.

Erke or ERKE may also refer to:

== People ==
- Derya Erke (1983–2025), Turkish swimmer
- Elisabeth Erke (born 1962), Norwegian Sami educator and politician
- Jason Erkes (born 1969), American journalist, media strategist and entrepreneur

== Places ==
- Erke-Kashka, village in Aravan District, Osh Region of Kyrgyzstan
