= Jar-Kyshtak =

Jar-Kyshtak may refer to the following places in Kyrgyzstan:

- Jar-Kyshtak, Alay, a village in Alay District, Osh Region
- Jar-Kyshtak, Aravan, a village in Aravan District, Osh Region
- Jar-Kyshtak, Barpy, a village in Suzak District, Jalal-Abad Region
- Jar-Kyshtak, Leilek, a village in Leilek District, Batken Region
- Jar-Kyshtak, Yrys, a village in Suzak District, Jalal-Abad Region
