= Chil-Ustun =

Chil-Ustun Cave
- Чилустун үңкүрү (in Kyrgyz)
- Location within Kyrgyzstan
- Coordinates: 40°32′19″N 72°31′32″E
- Length: 380 m (1,250 ft)
- Elevation: 1,100 m (3,600 ft)
- Discovery: Ancient times
- Entrances: 1
- Show cave opened: no
- Lighting: Nne

Chil-Ustun
- IUCN category III (natural monument or feature)
- Interactive map of Chil-Ustun
- Location: Aravan District, Osh Region, Kyrgyzstan

Chil-Ustun Cave (Kyrgyz: Чил-Устун үңкүрү) also known as Aravan Cave is located in the Southwest of Kyrgyzstan in the Osh Mountains, composed of Paleozoic limestones, in 3.5 km from Aravan, Kyrgyzstan. It is a protected natural monument. The cave belongs to the group of Karst caves of outlier mountains to the west of Osh.

The entrance to the cave forms a 15-meter-tall (49 ft) and approximately 25-metre-wide (82 ft) arc. The cave is 380 meters long or up to 350 meters according to another source. It is located in a rock formation at 1100 meters above sea level. The entrance is located on a steep, oblique rock face.

The cave's existence has been known since mediaeval times as attested by Arabic inscriptions on the walls.

The cave consists of 3 chambers of different sizes, connected with corridors and narrow openings. The largest chamber is 85 m × 40 m × 20 m in size.

Inside the cave, stalactites and stalagmites (columns) reach heights of over 50 meters. These forms vary in color, from white and cream to dark brown.
