= Tengizbay =

Mountain pass in Kyrgyzstan

Tengizbay Pass
- Location within Kyrgyzstan
- Elevation: 3,666 metres (12,028 ft)

Third Approach
- Location: Kyrgyzstan
- Range: Alay Mountains
- Coordinates: 39°40′19″N 72°07′49″E

Tengizbay is a mountain pass at the border of Batken Region and Osh Region of Kyrgyzstan. Its elevation is 3,666 metres (12,028 ft). It connects the village Daroot-Korgon in the Alay Valley with the city Kyzyl-Kiya in the Fergana Valley.
