= Dodon, Kyrgyzstan =

Dodon Додон
- Location within Kyrgyzstan
- Coordinates: 40°19′0″N 72°16′20″E
- Country: Kyrgyzstan
- Region: Osh Region
- District: Nookat District
- Elevation: 1,130 m (3,710 ft)

Population (2021)
  - Total: 1,559
- Time zone: UTC+6

Dodon is a village in Osh Region of Kyrgyzstan. It is part of the Nookat District. Its population was 1,559 in 2021.
