= Kök-Bel =

Kök-Bel Көк-Бел
- Location within Kyrgyzstan
- Coordinates: 40°15′0″N 72°55′48″E
- Country: Kyrgyzstan
- Region: Osh Region
- District: Nookat District
- Elevation: 1,865 m (6,119 ft)

Population (2021)
  - Total: 7,879
- Time zone: UTC+6

Kök-Bel is a village in Osh Region of Kyrgyzstan. It is part of the Nookat District. Its population was 7,879 in 2021.

== Population ==
Historical population
Year	Pop.	±% p.a.
2009	5,712	—
2021	7,879	+2.72%
Note: resident population; Sources:
