= Kabyk =

Kabyk Кабык
- Location within Kyrgyzstan
- Coordinates: 39°35′20″N 72°23′15″E
- Country: Kyrgyzstan
- Region: Osh
- District: Chong-Alay
- Elevation: 2,680 m (8,790 ft)

Population (2021)
  - Total: 1,104
- Time zone: UTC+6

Kabyk (Kyrgyz: Кабык) is a village in the Osh Region, Kyrgyzstan, in the Vakhsh valley near the border with Tajikistan. It is part of the Chong-Alay District. Its population was 1,104 in 2021.
