= Tash-Bulak, Osh =

Tash-Bulak
- Location within Kyrgyzstan
- Coordinates: 40°15′0″N 72°13′48″E
- Country: Kyrgyzstan
- Region: Osh Region
- District: Nookat District
- Elevation: 1,216 m (3,990 ft)

Population (2021)
  - Total: 229
- Time zone: UTC+6

Tash-Bulak is a village in Osh Region of Kyrgyzstan. It is part of the Nookat District. Its population was 229 in 2021.
