= Üch-Bay =

Üch-Bay Үч-Бай
- Location within Kyrgyzstan
- Coordinates: 40°18′0″N 72°42′0″E
- Country: Kyrgyzstan
- Region: Osh
- District: Nookat
- Elevation: 1,286 m (4,219 ft)

Population (2021)
  - Total: 2,545
- Time zone: UTC+6

Üch-Bay (Kyrgyz: Үч-Бай) is a village in Osh Region of Kyrgyzstan. It is part of the Nookat District. Its population was 2,545 in 2021.
