= Gerey-Shoron =

Gerey-Shoron Герей-Шорон
- Location within Kyrgyzstan
- Coordinates: 40°18′0″N 72°13′48″E
- Country: Kyrgyzstan
- Region: Osh Region
- District: Nookat District
- Elevation: 1,085 m (3,560 ft)

Population (2021)
  - Total: 3,326
- Time zone: UTC+6

Gerey-Shoron is a village in Osh Region of Kyrgyzstan. It is part of the Nookat District. Its population was 3,326 in 2021.
