= Shankol =

- Location within Kyrgyzstan
- Coordinates: 40°13′37″N 72°44′50″E
- Country: Kyrgyzstan
- Region: Osh Region
- District: Nookat District
- Elevation: 1,455 m (4,774 ft)

Population (2021)
  - Total: 2,182
- Time zone: UTC+6

Shankol is a village in Nookat District of Osh Region of Kyrgyzstan. Its population was 2,182 in 2021.
