= Aral, Osh =

Aral
- Location within Kyrgyzstan
- Coordinates: 40°18′0″N 72°37′40″E
- Country: Kyrgyzstan
- Region: Osh Region
- District: Nookat District
- Elevation: 1,224 m (4,016 ft)

Population (2021)
  - Total: 2,452
- Time zone: UTC+6

Aral is a village in the Osh Region of Kyrgyzstan. It is part of the Nookat District. Its population was 2,452 in 2021.
