= Nayman =

- Location within Kyrgyzstan
- Coordinates: 40°19′N 72°21′E
- Country: Kyrgyzstan
- Region: Osh Region
- District: Nookat District
- Elevation: 1,300 m (4,300 ft)

Population (2021)
  - Total: 1,811
- Time zone: UTC+6

Nayman is a village in Nookat District, Osh Region, southwestern Kyrgyzstan. Its population was 1,811 in 2021. Until 2012 it was an urban-type settlement.

== Population ==
Historical population
Year	Pop.	±% p.a.
1970	1,657	—
1979	2,507	+4.71%
1989	2,580	+0.29%
1999	1,828	−3.39%
2009	1,754	−0.41%
2021	1,811	+0.27%
Note: resident population; Sources:
