= Jangy-Aryk, Aravan =

Jangy-Aryk
- Location within Kyrgyzstan
- Coordinates: 40°26′20″N 72°35′20″E
- Country: Kyrgyzstan
- Region: Osh Region
- District: Aravan District
- Elevation: 989 m (3,245 ft)

Population (2021)
  - Total: 2,538
- Time zone: UTC+6

Jangy-Aryk (Kyrgyz: Жаңы-Арык) is a village in Osh Region of Kyrgyzstan. It is part of the Aravan District. Its population was 2,538 in 2021. It lies on the right bank of the river Aravansay, adjacent to the smaller village Kök-Jatyk.
