= Ay-Tamga =

Ay-Tamga Ай-Тамга
- Location within Kyrgyzstan
- Coordinates: 40°19′0″N 72°15′0″E
- Country: Kyrgyzstan
- Region: Osh Region
- District: Nookat District

Population (2021)
  - Total: 2,648
- Time zone: UTC+6

Ay-Tamga is a village in Osh Region of Kyrgyzstan. It is part of the Nookat District. Its population was 2,648 in 2021.
