= Kuu-Maydan =

Kuu-Maydan Куу-Майдан
- Location within Kyrgyzstan
- Coordinates: 40°14′30″N 72°44′0″E
- Country: Kyrgyzstan
- Region: Osh
- District: Nookat
- Elevation: 1,395 m (4,577 ft)

Population (2021)
  - Total: 3,809
- Time zone: UTC+6

Kuu-Maydan is a village in the Osh Region of Kyrgyzstan. It is part of the Nookat District. Its population was 3,809 in 2021.
