= Mangit =

Mangit may refer to:

- Manghud, a clan of the Mongols and later a nomadic group of the Uzbeks
- Mangit, Kyrgyzstan
- Mangit, Uzbekistan
