= Gülstan, Osh =

Gülstan Гүлстан
- Location within Kyrgyzstan
- Coordinates: 40°15′40″N 72°36′00″E
- Country: Kyrgyzstan
- Region: Osh
- District: Nookat

Population (2021)
  - Total: 6,113
- Time zone: UTC+6

Gülstan (Kyrgyz: Гүлстан) is a village in Osh Region of Kyrgyzstan. It is part of the Nookat District. Its population was 6,113 in 2021.

== Population ==
Historical population
Year	Pop.	±% p.a.
2009	3,423	—
2021	6,113	+4.95%
Note: resident population; Sources:
