= Noygut =

Noygut Нойгут
- Location within Kyrgyzstan
- Coordinates: 40°14′40″N 72°36′30″E
- Country: Kyrgyzstan
- Region: Osh
- District: Nookat

Population (2021)
  - Total: 5,043
- Time zone: UTC+6

Noygut (Kyrgyz: Нойгут) is a village in Osh Region of Kyrgyzstan. It is part of the Nookat District. Its population was 5,043 in 2021.

== Population ==
Historical population
Year	Pop.	±% p.a.
2009	3,190	—
2021	5,043	+3.89%
Note: resident population; Sources:
