= Tölöykön, Aravan =

Tölöykön Төлөйкөн
- Location within Kyrgyzstan
- Coordinates: 40°26′24″N 72°33′36″E
- Country: Kyrgyzstan
- Region: Osh Region
- District: Aravan District
- Elevation: 955 m (3,133 ft)

Population (2021)
  - Total: 4,073
- Time zone: UTC+6

Tölöykön is a village in Osh Region of Kyrgyzstan. It is part of the Mangyt rural community, Aravan District. Its population was 4,073 in 2021.
