= Jar-Korgon =

Village in Osh Region, Kyrgyzstan

Jar-Korgon Жар-Коргон
- Location within Kyrgyzstan
- Coordinates: 40°14′30″N 72°48′16″E
- Country: Kyrgyzstan
- Region: Osh Region
- District: Nookat District
- Elevation: 1,500 m (4,900 ft)

Population (2021)
  - Total: 4,336

Jar-Korgon is a village in Nookat District of Osh Region of Kyrgyzstan. Its population was 4,336 in 2021.
