= Karanay =

- Location within Kyrgyzstan
- Coordinates: 40°18′10″N 72°23′10″E
- Country: Kyrgyzstan
- Region: Osh Region
- District: Nookat District
- Elevation: 1,284 m (4,213 ft)

Population (2021)
  - Total: 3,158
- Time zone: UTC+6

Karanay is a village in Osh Region of Kyrgyzstan. It is part of the Nookat District. Its population was 3,158 in 2021.
