= Alashan =

Alashan (Mongolian: Alaša, PRC romanization: Alxa) may refer to:

- Helan Mountains, a mountain range in northern China, between Ningxia and Inner Mongolia's Alxa League
- Alxa League, a prefecture-level division of Inner Mongolia
- Alashan, Kyrgyzstan, a town in Kyrgyzstan
