= Chong-Alay District =

Coordinates: 39.5520°N 72.2001°E

Chong-Alay Чоң Алай району
- District
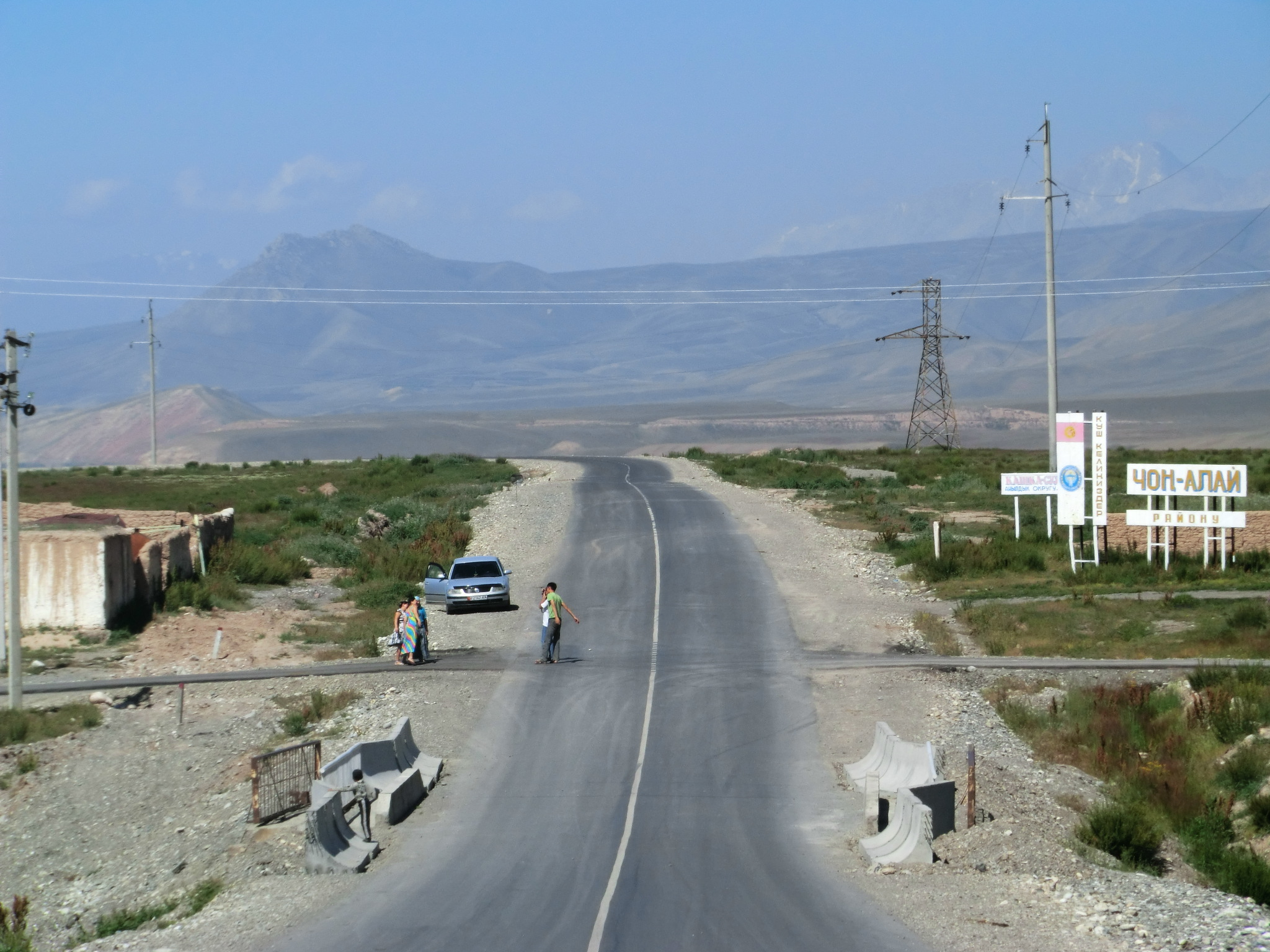
- The border between Chong-Alay district and Alay district

- Flag Coat of arms

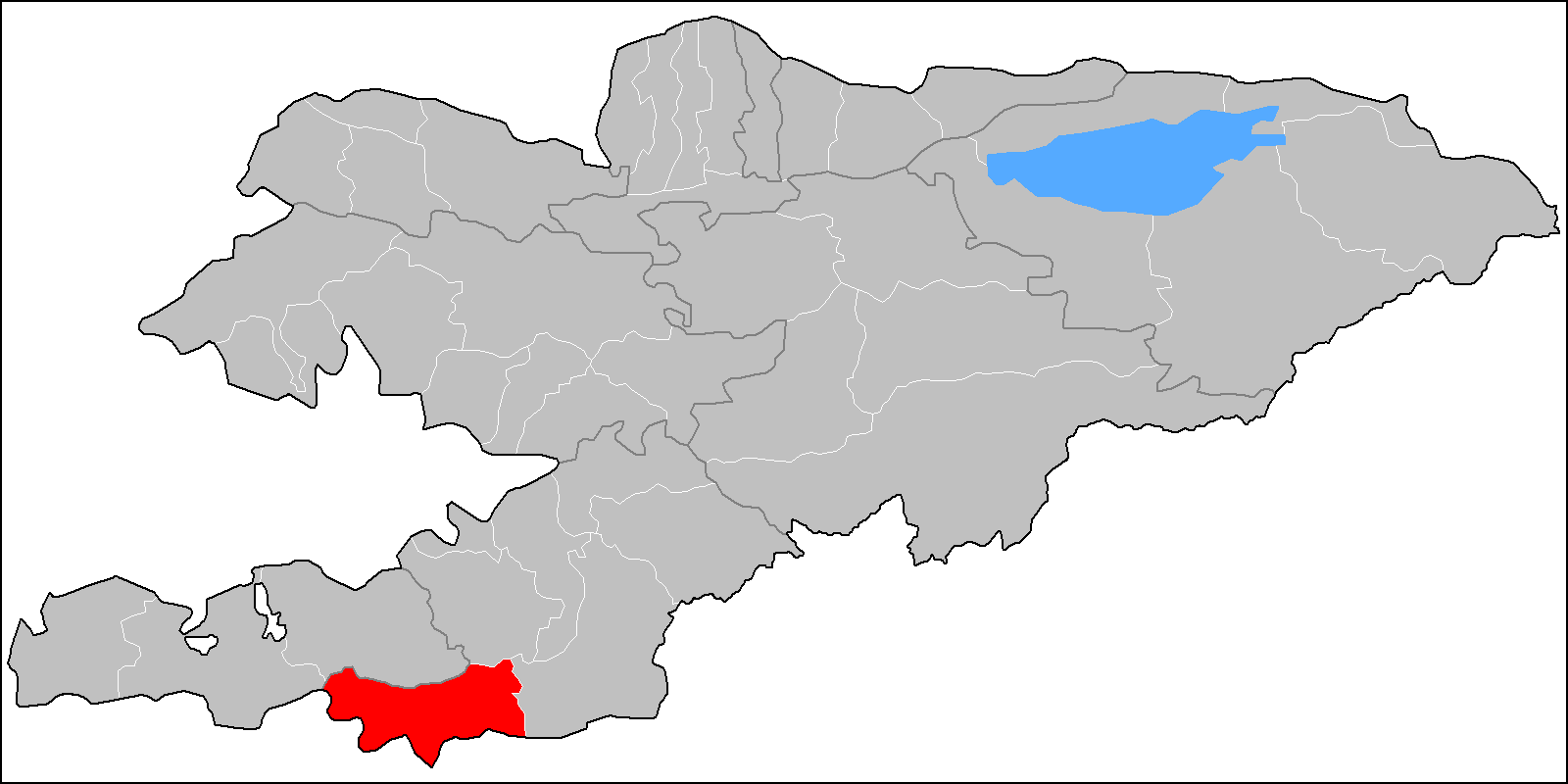
- Country: Kyrgyzstan
- Region: Osh Region

Area
  - Total: 4,857 km^{2} (1,875 sq mi)

Population (2021)
  - Total: 32,140
  - Density: 6.617/km^{2} (17.14/sq mi)
- Time zone: UTC+6

Chong-Alay District (big Alay) (Kyrgyz: Чоң Алай району; Russian: Чон-Алайский район) is a district of Osh Region in far south-western Kyrgyzstan. The administrative seat lies at Daroot-Korgon. Its area is 4,857 square kilometres (1,875 sq mi), and its resident population was 32,140 in 2021. The Chong-Alay District include 3 rural communities (Kyrgyz: айыл аймагы, romanized: ayyl aymagy): Chong-Alay, Kashka-Suu, and Jekendi.

== History ==
Eurasianet reported that on September 17, 2022, as part of the 2022 Kyrgyzstan-Tajikistan clashes, Chong-Alay District was the site of an exchange of mortar fire with Tajikistani troops.

== Geography ==
Chong-Alay District occupies the western part of Alay Valley. The northern boundary of the district is located at Alay Mountains, and southern - at Trans-Alay Range. The valley is inclined from east to west, with the lowest point at 1560 meters above sea level.

Climate is sharply continental with cold winters. Annual precipitation is 500–650 mm. Average temperature in July is +19-22C, and December -10-15C.

The hydrology is dominated by the river Kyzyl-Suu (flowing towards the west) and its tributaries.

== Demographics ==
According to the 2009 Census, the ethnic composition (de jure population) of the Chong-Alay District was 99.9% Kyrgyz and 0.1% other groups.

Historical populations in Chong-Alay District
Year	Pop.	±% p.a.
1970	7,877	—
1979	10,084	+2.78%
1989	14,616	+3.78%
1999	21,759	+4.06%
2009	25,039	+1.41%
2021	32,140	+2.10%
Note: resident population; Sources:

=== Populated places ===
In total Chong-Alay District comprised 22 settlements in 3 rural communities (ayyl aymagy). Each rural community can consist of one or several villages. The rural communities and settlements in the Chong-Alay District are:

1. Jekendi (seat: Karamyk; incl. Jekendi, Kara-Teyit, Shibee and Chuluk)
2. Kashka-Suu (seat: Kashka-Suu; incl. Achyk-Suu, Kabyk, Kara-Kabak, Burgan-Suu, Jayylma and Kichi-Jayylma)
3. Chong-Alay (seat: Daroot-Korgon; incl. Jar-Bashy, Jash-Tilek, Jaman-Jar, Kochkorchu, Kulchu, Kyzyl-Tuu, Sary-Bulak, Chak, Kyzyl-Eshme and Kara-Shybak)
Settlements of the Chong-Alay District
