= Kojo-Aryk =

Kojo-Aryk Кожо-Арык
- Location within Kyrgyzstan
- Coordinates: 40°14′54″N 72°19′38″E
- Country: Kyrgyzstan
- Region: Osh Region
- District: Nookat District
- Elevation: 1,435 m (4,708 ft)

Population (2021)
  - Total: 5,474

Kojo-Aryk is a village in Nookat District of Osh Region of Kyrgyzstan. Its population was 5,474 in 2021.

== Population ==
Historical population
Year	Pop.	±% p.a.
2009	8,122	—
2021	5,474	−3.23%
Note: resident population; Sources:
