= Köchübaev =

Köchübaev Көчүбаев
- Location within Kyrgyzstan
- Coordinates: 40°30′30″N 72°26′40″E
- Country: Kyrgyzstan
- Region: Osh
- District: Aravan
- Elevation: 735 m (2,411 ft)

Population (2021)
  - Total: 6,390
- Time zone: UTC+6

Köchübaev (Kyrgyz: Көчүбаев) is a village in Aravan District, Osh Region of Kyrgyzstan. Its population was 6,390 in 2021.

== Population ==
Historical population
Year	Pop.	±% p.a.
2009	5,004	—
2021	6,390	+2.06%
Note: resident population; Sources:
