= Borbash, Kyzyl-Oktyabr =

Borbash Борбаш
- Location within Kyrgyzstan
- Coordinates: 40°17′00″N 72°22′20″E
- Country: Kyrgyzstan
- Region: Osh
- District: Nookat

Population (2021)
  - Total: 5,248
- Time zone: UTC+6

Borbash (Kyrgyz: Борбаш) is a village in Nookat District of Osh Region of Kyrgyzstan. It is part of the Kyzyl-Oktyabr rural community (ayyl aymagy). Its population was 5,248 in 2021.

== Population ==
Historical population
| Year | Pop. | ±% p.a. |
|---|---|---|
| 2009 | 3,790 | — |
| 2021 | 5,248 | +2.75% |
Note: resident population; Sources:
