= Kerkidan =

Kerkidan Керкидан
- Location within Kyrgyzstan
- Coordinates: 40°23′50″N 72°05′43″E
- Country: Kyrgyzstan
- Region: Osh Region
- District: Aravan District
- Elevation: 650 m (2,130 ft)

Population (2021)
  - Total: 2,219

Kerkidan is a village in Aravan District of Osh Region of Kyrgyzstan. Its population was 2,219 in 2021.

== Trivia ==
There is a Turkish public Discord server founded in 2021 named "Kördehen" and its name comes from this Kyrgyz Village. Kerkidan slowly changed into Kördehen over time.
