= Chech-Döbö =

Chech-Döbö may refer to the following places in Kyrgyzstan:

- Chech-Döbö, Jalal-Abad, a village in Toktogul District, Jalal-Abad Region
- Chech-Döbö, Osh, a village in Nookat District, Osh Region
- Chech-Döbö, Talas, a village in Manas District, Talas Region
