= Kara-Tash, Nookat =

Kara-Tash
- Location within Kyrgyzstan
- Coordinates: 40°13′0″N 72°37′50″E
- Country: Kyrgyzstan
- Region: Osh Region
- District: Nookat District

Population (2021)
  - Total: 10,797
- Time zone: UTC+6

Kara-Tash (formerly: imeni Kalinina) is a village in Osh Region of Kyrgyzstan. It is part of the Nookat District. Its population was 10,797 in 2021.

== Population ==
Historical population
Year	Pop.	±% p.a.
2009	8,300	—
2021	10,797	+2.22%
Note: resident population; Sources:
