= Yatan, Kyrgyzstan =

Yatan Ятан
- Location within Kyrgyzstan
- Coordinates: 40°18′50″N 72°40′10″E
- Country: Kyrgyzstan
- Region: Osh Region
- District: Nookat District

Population (2021)
  - Total: 2,247
- Time zone: UTC+6

Yatan is a village in Osh Region of Kyrgyzstan. It is part of the Nookat District. Its population was 2,247 in 2021.
