= Ak-Shor =

Ak-Shor Ак-Шор
- Location within Kyrgyzstan
- Coordinates: 40°27′36″N 72°12′36″E
- Country: Kyrgyzstan
- Region: Osh Region
- District: Aravan District
- Established: 1968
- Elevation: 614 m (2,014 ft)

Population (2021)
  - Total: 3,129
- Time zone: UTC+6

Ak-Shor is a village in Aravan District of Osh Region of Kyrgyzstan established in 1968. Its population was 3,129 in 2021.
