= Jar-Bashy =

Jar-Bashy Жар-Башы
- Location within Kyrgyzstan
- Coordinates: 39°30′36″N 72°6′36″E
- Country: Kyrgyzstan
- Region: Osh
- District: Chong-Alay
- Elevation: 2,442 m (8,012 ft)

Population (2021)
  - Total: 2,798
- Time zone: UTC+6

Jar-Bashy is a village in Osh Region of Kyrgyzstan. It is part of the Chong-Alay District. Its population was 2,798 in 2021.

The village of Chak is 6 km (4 mi) to the north, and Kara-Shybak is 6 km (4 mi) to the east.
