= Gulbakhor, Kyrgyzstan =

Gulbakhor Гулбахор
- Location within Kyrgyzstan
- Coordinates: 40°28′48″N 72°39′0″E
- Country: Kyrgyzstan
- Region: Osh Region
- District: Aravan District
- Elevation: 1,019 m (3,343 ft)

Population (2021)
  - Total: 10,718
- Time zone: UTC+6

Gulbakhor is a village in Aravan District, Osh Region of Kyrgyzstan. Its population was 10,718 in 2021.

== Population ==
Historical population
Year	Pop.	±% p.a.
2009	7,718	—
2021	10,718	+2.77%
Note: resident population; Sources:
