= Jekendi =

Zhekendi Жекенди
- Coordinates: 39°30′N 71°54′E
- Country: Kyrgyzstan
- Region: Osh
- District: Chong-Alay

Population (2021)
  - Total: 1,588
- Time zone: UTC+6

Jekendi (Kyrgyz: Жекенди) is a village in Kyrgyzstan in the Vakhsh (Kyzyl-Suu) river valley near the border with Tajikistan. It is part of the Chong-Alay District. Its population was 1,588 in 2021.
