= Kesek =

Kesek Кесек
- Village
- Location within Kyrgyzstan
- Coordinates: 40°26′24″N 72°34′48″E
- Country: Kyrgyzstan
- Region: Osh
- District: Aravan District
- Elevation: 944 m (3,097 ft)

Population (2021)
  - Total: 1,385
- Time zone: UTC+6

Kesek (or Kisek) is a village in Osh Region of Kyrgyzstan. It is part of the Aravan District. Its population was 1,385 in 2021.
