= Aravan, Kyrgyzstan =

Aravan Араван
- Village
- Location within Kyrgyzstan
- Coordinates: 40°30′54″N 72°29′57″E
- Country: Kyrgyzstan
- Region: Osh Region
- District: Aravan District

Population (2021)
  - Total: 32,917
- Time zone: UTC+6
- Area code: 3231

Aravan is a large village in the Fergana Valley, in Aravan District of Osh Region, Kyrgyzstan, Central Asia about 25 km west of Osh, on the river Aravansay. It is the administrative seat of Aravan District. Its population was 32,917 in 2021, of which 21,818 in Yusupov rural community and 11,099 in Allya Anarov rural community.

Located on the Silk Road. Nearby are the Celestial Horses of Aravan, carved on a cliff face perhaps in the 1st century BC. They are thought to represent the 'blood-sweating horses' sought by the Chinese of the Han dynasty. The petroglyphs have an important role in regional folklore and have become a pilgrimage site for Muslims in the Fergana Valley. There is a Sufi shrine. The Chil-Ustun cave system is 4 km away in the hills above the river Aravansay. There is a similar cave system 20 km away. Neither is easily accessible.

== Population ==
Historical population
Year	Pop.	±% p.a.
2009	26,715	—
2021	32,917	+1.75%
Note: resident population; Sources:

== Celestial Horses of Aravan ==
The Celestial Horses site itself is just near the local hospital when you are about to enter Aravan, on your right hand side when coming from Osh. The petroglyphs, who date from the first century BC, are carved on a near-vertical rock face next to a cemetery and represent solar symbols and the legendary Ferghana horses which were much sought after by Chinese emperor Wu in the second century BC. The site was archaeologically researched from the 1930s to the 1980s, and excavations at the foot of the rock produced evidence of animal sacrifice sites. Today, the horse carvings and nearby spring are still a local pilgrimage site and there is a small mosque. As a matter of fact, there are far more modern-day graffiti than ancient petroglyphs on the rock since a local superstition considers it as a luckbringer to have your name eternalized on the rocks.

There are more petroglyphs near Camp Charbak.

== Chil-Ustun ==
Chil-Ustun cave is located on the south-west of Kyrgyzstan, in 3,5 km from Aravan settlement. Nearby, in the limestone hills that make up the foothills of the Ak-Buura and Aravansay river basins lie the Chil-Ustun cave system that is named after the stalactites that can be found here, (Chil-Ustun is Tajik and means 40 columns).

A huge entrance in the cave in the form of arc with a height of 15 m and a length of basement 25 m is located in the rocky group on almost plumb wall at the altitude of 1100 m. The cave consists of 3 halls of different volume, connected with corridors and narrow man holes.

Tiff accumulated forms stalactites. Quaint forms of different colors from white and cream to dark-brown create a unique fairy interior of the hall. The length of the cave is 380 m.

== Dangi Canyon ==
To the south of Aravan is the Dangi Canyon, which is dissected by the river Aravansay. In and near the canyon are a series of caves, including Ajydaar-Üngkür, Surprise cave, Baryte cave and Fersman cave.

== Sports ==
Aravan's football team is FC Ak-Zhol. But the club withdrew from Kyrgyzstan League due to political unrest in April 2010.

The futsal league is named League Aravan.kg.

== Aravan's Mosque ==
The largest mosque in Aravan. Was established in 2006 with help of money from Saudi Arabia. Part of the mosque was burned shortly after its establishment. The mosque was restored again within a short time with the help of people Aravan and was opened for worship.
