= Kara-Kabak =

- Location within Kyrgyzstan
- Coordinates: 39°40′N 72°43′E
- Country: Kyrgyzstan
- Region: Osh Region
- District: Chong-Alay District
- Elevation: 2,826 m (9,272 ft)

Population (2021)
  - Total: 795
- Time zone: UTC+6

Kara-Kabak is a village in Osh Region of Kyrgyzstan. It is part of the Chong-Alay District. Its population was 795 in 2021.

The village of Kashka-Suu is 3 kilometres (2 mi) to the southwest.
