= Kosh-Döbö =

Kosh-Döbö may refer to the following places in Kyrgyzstan:

- Kosh-Döbö, Ak-Talaa, a village in Ak-Talaa District, Naryn Region
- Kosh-Döbö, Osh, a village in Nookat District, Osh Region
- Kosh-Döbö, Tüp, a village in Tüp District, Issyk-Kul Region
