= Karamyk =

Karamyk Карамык
- Location within Kyrgyzstan
- Coordinates: 39°29′N 71°48′E
- Country: Kyrgyzstan
- Region: Osh
- District: Chong-Alay

Population (2021)
  - Total: 3,324
- Time zone: UTC+6

Karamyk (Kyrgyz: Карамык) is a village in the Osh Region of Kyrgyzstan. It is part of the Chong-Alay District. It is on the river Vakhsh (Kyzyl-Suu), in the Alay Valley near the border with Tajikistan. The village is a Kyrgyz-Tajik border crossing on European route E60 (AH65). Its population was 3,324 in 2021.
