= Fedorov (disambiguation) =

Fedorov or Fyodorov is a Russian surname.

Fedorov may also refer to:

- Fedorov (crater), a lunar crater
- Akademik Fedorov, research ship
- Fedorov Avtomat, Russian machine gun
- Fedorov, Kyrgyzstan, village in Kyrgyzstan
- Fedorov Guyot, alternative name for Ioah Guyot, gyot (seamount) close to the Marshall Islands
