= Kichik-Alay =

- Location within Kyrgyzstan
- Coordinates: 40°01′48″N 72°54′36″E
- Country: Kyrgyzstan
- Region: Osh Region
- District: Nookat District
- Elevation: 1,985 m (6,512 ft)

Population (2021)
  - Total: 266
- Time zone: UTC+6

Kichik-Alay (Kyrgyz: Кичик-Алай) is a village in Osh Region of Kyrgyzstan. It is part of the Nookat District. Its population was 266 in 2021.
