= Kayragach, Osh =

Borbash
- Location within Kyrgyzstan
- Coordinates: 40°15′53″N 72°30′30″E
- Country: Kyrgyzstan
- Region: Osh Region
- District: Nookat District

Area
  - Total: 2 km^{2} (0.77 sq mi)
- Elevation: 1,420 m (4,660 ft)

Population (2021)
  - Total: 6,931

Kayragach is a village in Nookat District of Osh Region of Kyrgyzstan. It is part of the Bel rural community (ayyl aymagy). Its population was 6,931 in 2021.

== Population ==
Historical population
Year	Pop.	±% p.a.
2009	5,622	—
2021	6,931	+1.76%
Note: resident population; Sources:
