= Ajydaar-Üngkür =

Karst cave

- IUCN category III (natural monument or feature)
- Location within Kyrgyzstan
- Location: Nookat District, Osh Region, Kyrgyzstan
- Coordinates: 40.355°N 72.606°E
- Established: 1975

Ajydaar-Üngkür (Kyrgyz: Ажыдаар үңкүр) is a karst cave near the Dangi Canyon in Nookat District, Osh Region, Kyrgyzstan. It consists of a large tunnel which goes more than 120 metres into the limestone mountain and is notable for the fact that it is home to Kyrgyzstan's only colony of bats. The bat colony consists of lesser mouse-eared bats and greater horseshoe bats.

It is a geological protected area (since 1975) located at slopes of the mountain Töömoyun. Two hundred metres from Ajydaar-Üngkür, on the same southern slope, is a cavity 60 metres deep and which descends in impressive onyx steps. The cave has two entrances: a natural entrance, in the form of a karst well 20 metres deep, and a manmade one, which provides easy access to the lower, more beautiful section of the cave.
