= Tepe-Korgon =

Tepe-Korgon Тепе-Коргон
- Location within Kyrgyzstan
- Coordinates: 40°36′0″N 72°24′0″E
- Country: Kyrgyzstan
- Region: Osh Region
- District: Aravan District
- Elevation: 589 m (1,932 ft)

Population (2021)
  - Total: 9,186
- Time zone: UTC+6

Tepe-Korgon is a village in Aravan District, Osh Region of Kyrgyzstan. Its population was 9,186 in 2021.

== Population ==
Historical population
| Year | Pop. | ±% p.a. |
|---|---|---|
| 2009 | 7,556 | — |
| 2021 | 9,186 | +1.64% |
Note: resident population; Sources:
