= Shibee =

Shibee Шибээ
- Location within Kyrgyzstan
- Coordinates: 39°27′35″N 71°55′09″E
- Country: Kyrgyzstan
- Region: Osh
- District: Chong-Alay
- Elevation: 2,826 m (9,272 ft)

Population (2021)
  - Total: 1,073
- Time zone: UTC+6

Shibee (Kyrgyz: Шибээ) is a village in Kyrgyzstan in the Vakhsh valley near the border with Tajikistan. It is part of the Chong-Alay District. Its population was 1,073 in 2021.
