= Khauz =

Khauz Хауз
- Location within Kyrgyzstan
- Coordinates: 40°22′32″N 72°12′17″E
- Country: Kyrgyzstan
- Region: Osh Region
- District: Aravan District
- Elevation: 890 m (2,920 ft)

Population (2021)
  - Total: 1,964

Khauz is a village in Aravan District of Osh Region of Kyrgyzstan. Its population was 1,964 in 2021.
