= Kojoke =

Kojoke Кожоке
- Location within Kyrgyzstan
- Coordinates: 40°14′11″N 72°46′57″E
- Country: Kyrgyzstan
- Region: Osh Region
- District: Nookat District

Area
  - Total: 1 km^{2} (0.39 sq mi)
- Elevation: 1,445 m (4,741 ft)

Population (2021)
  - Total: 5,342

Kojoke is a village in Nookat District of Osh Region of Kyrgyzstan. Its population was 5,342 in 2021.

== Population ==
Historical population
Year	Pop.	±% p.a.
2009	4,324	—
2021	5,342	+1.78%
Note: resident population; Sources:
