= Kyzyl-Korgon, Osh =

Kyzyl-Korgon
- Location within Kyrgyzstan
- Coordinates: 40°24′30″N 72°35′0″E
- Country: Kyrgyzstan
- Region: Osh Region
- District: Aravan District

Population (2021)
  - Total: 1,072
- Time zone: UTC+6

Kyzyl-Korgon is a village in Osh Region of Kyrgyzstan. It is part of the Aravan District. Its population was 1,072 in 2021.
