= Baglan, Nookat =

Baglan Баглан
- Location within Kyrgyzstan
- Coordinates: 40°13′32″N 72°13′39″E
- Country: Kyrgyzstan
- Region: Osh Region
- District: Nookat District
- Elevation: 1,260 m (4,130 ft)

Population (2021)
  - Total: 1,953

Baglan is a village in Nookat District of Osh Region of Kyrgyzstan. Its population was 1,953 in 2021.
