= Frunze, Osh =

Frunze Фрунзе
- Location within Kyrgyzstan
- Coordinates: 40°16′30″N 72°36′00″E
- Country: Kyrgyzstan
- Region: Osh
- District: Nookat

Population (2021)
  - Total: 6,628
- Time zone: UTC+6

Frunze (Kyrgyz: Фрунзе) is a village in Osh Region of Kyrgyzstan. It is part of the Nookat District. Its population was 6,628 in 2021.

== Population ==
Historical population
Year	Pop.	±% p.a.
2009	12,814	—
2021	6,628	−5.35%
Note: resident population; Sources:
