= Baryn =

Baryn Барын
- Location within Kyrgyzstan
- Coordinates: 40°15′40″N 72°38′30″E
- Country: Kyrgyzstan
- Region: Osh
- District: Nookat

Population (2021)
  - Total: 10,619
- Time zone: UTC+6

Baryn (Kyrgyz: Барын) is a village in Osh Region of Kyrgyzstan. It is part of the Nookat District. Its population was 10,619 in 2021.

== Population ==
Historical population
Year	Pop.	±% p.a.
2009	2,130	—
2021	10,619	+14.33%
Note: resident population; Sources:
