= Jangy-Bazar, Osh =

Jangy-Bazar Жаңы-Базар
- Location within Kyrgyzstan
- Coordinates: 40°14′50″N 72°45′45″E
- Country: Kyrgyzstan
- Region: Osh Region
- District: Nookat District
- Elevation: 1,385 m (4,544 ft)

Population (2021)
  - Total: 2,657

Jangy-Bazar is a village in Nookat District of Osh Region of Kyrgyzstan. Its population was 2,657 in 2021.
