= Agart =

- Location within Kyrgyzstan

Location
- Country: Kyrgyzstan

Physical characteristics
- Source: Kichi-Alay range
- Mouth: Aravansay
  - coordinates: 40°03′04″N 72°27′17″E

Basin features
- Progression: Aravansay→ Shahrixonsoy→ Great Fergana Canal→ Syr Darya→ North Aral Sea

The Agart (Kyrgyz: Агарт, also Акарт Akart) is a river in Osh Region, Kyrgyzstan. Its source is in the Kichi-Alay range, part of the Alay Range, and it discharges into the Aravansay.
