= Kara-Teyit =

Village in Osh Region, Kyrgyzstan

Kara-Teyit Кара-Тейит
- Location within Kyrgyzstan
- Coordinates: 39°30′N 71°45′E
- Country: Kyrgyzstan
- Region: Osh
- District: Chong-Alay

Population (2021)
  - Total: 1,439
- Time zone: UTC+6

Kara-Teyit (Kyrgyz: Кара-Тейит) is a village in Osh Region, Kyrgyzstan. It is part of the Chong-Alay District. Its population was 1,439 in 2021.
