= Kötörmö =

Kötörmö Көтөрмө
- Location within Kyrgyzstan
- Coordinates: 40°13′30″N 72°40′30″E
- Country: Kyrgyzstan
- Region: Osh Region
- District: Nookat District

Population (2021)
  - Total: 4,193
- Time zone: UTC+6

Kötörmö is a village in Osh Region of Kyrgyzstan. It is part of the Nookat District. Its population was 4,193 in 2021.
