= Kyrgyz-Ata =

Kyrgyz-Ata Кыргыз-Ата
- Location within Kyrgyzstan
- Coordinates: 40°12′10″N 72°40′50″E
- Country: Kyrgyzstan
- Region: Osh
- District: Nookat

Population (2021)
  - Total: 6,538
- Time zone: UTC+6

Kyrgyz-Ata (Kyrgyz: Кыргыз-Ата) is a village in Osh Region of Kyrgyzstan. It is part of the Nookat District. Its population was 6,538 in 2021.

== Population ==
Historical population
Year	Pop.	±% p.a.
2009	5,377	—
2021	6,538	+1.64%
Note: resident population; Sources:
