= Ak-Chal =

Ak-Chal Ак-Чал
- Location within Kyrgyzstan
- Coordinates: 40°14′05″N 72°17′50″E
- Country: Kyrgyzstan
- Region: Osh
- District: Nookat
- Elevation: 1,387 m (4,551 ft)

Population (2021)
  - Total: 2,244
- Time zone: UTC+6

Ak-Chal (Kyrgyz: Ак-Чал, also Акчал) is a village in Osh Region of Kyrgyzstan. It is part of the Nookat District. Its population was 2,244 in 2021.
