= Jiyde =

Jiyde Жийде
- Location within Kyrgyzstan
- Coordinates: 40°18′0″N 72°25′48″E
- Country: Kyrgyzstan
- Region: Osh Region
- District: Nookat District
- Elevation: 1,354 m (4,442 ft)

Population (2021)
  - Total: 5,443
- Time zone: UTC+6

Jiyde is a village in Osh Region of Kyrgyzstan. It is part of the Nookat District. Its population was 5,443 in 2021.

== Population ==
Historical population
Year	Pop.	±% p.a.
2009	3,719	—
2021	5,443	+3.22%
Note: resident population; Sources:
