= Fedorov, Kyrgyzstan =

Fedorov Федоров
- Location within Kyrgyzstan
- Coordinates: 40°14′57″N 72°46′50″E
- Country: Kyrgyzstan
- Region: Osh
- District: Nookat

Area
  - Total: 1 km^{2} (0.39 sq mi)
- Elevation: 1,412 m (4,633 ft)

Population (2021)
  - Total: 5,805

Fedorov (Kyrgyz: Федоров) is a village in Osh Region of Kyrgyzstan. It is part of the Nookat District. Its population was 5,805 in 2021.

== Population ==
Historical population
Year	Pop.	±% p.a.
2009	4,368	—
2021	5,805	+2.40%
Note: resident population; Sources:
