= Alashan, Kyrgyzstan =

Alashan
- Location within Kyrgyzstan
- Coordinates: 40°18′40″N 72°21′20″E
- Country: Kyrgyzstan
- Region: Osh Region
- District: Nookat District
- Elevation: 1,211 m (3,973 ft)

Population (2021)
  - Total: 3,260
- Time zone: UTC+6

Alashan is a village in Osh Region of Kyrgyzstan. It is part of the Nookat District. Its population was 3,260 in 2021.
