= Kara-Shybak =

Kara-Shybak Кара-Шыбак
- Location within Kyrgyzstan
- Coordinates: 39°30′36″N 72°10′48″E
- Country: Kyrgyzstan
- Region: Osh Region
- District: Chong-Alay District
- Elevation: 2,563 m (8,409 ft)

Population (2021)
  - Total: 240
- Time zone: UTC+6

Kara-Shybak is a village in Osh Region of Kyrgyzstan. It is part of the Chong-Alay District. Its population was 240 in 2021.

The large village of Daroot-Korgon is 3 km (2 mi) to the north.
