= Internatsional, Nookat =

Internatsional
- Location within Kyrgyzstan
- Coordinates: 40°16′20″N 72°39′50″E
- Country: Kyrgyzstan
- Region: Osh Region
- District: Nookat District
- Elevation: 1,285 m (4,216 ft)

Population (2021)
  - Total: 3,390
- Time zone: UTC+6

Internatsional (formerly: Kashkaldak) is a village in Osh Region of Kyrgyzstan. It is part of the Nookat District. Its population was 3,390 in 2021.
