= Chech-Döbö, Osh =

Chech-Döbö Чеч-Дөбө
- Location within Kyrgyzstan
- Coordinates: 40°15′10″N 72°48′40″E
- Country: Kyrgyzstan
- Region: Osh Region
- District: Nookat District

Area
  - Total: 1 km^{2} (0.39 sq mi)
- Elevation: 1,475 m (4,839 ft)

Population (2021)
  - Total: 3,567

Chech-Döbö is a village in Nookat District of Osh Region of Kyrgyzstan. Its population was 3,567 in 2021.
