= Erke-Kashka =

- Location within Kyrgyzstan
- Coordinates: 40°32′50″N 72°26′20″E
- Country: Kyrgyzstan
- Region: Osh Region
- District: Aravan District

Population (2021)
  - Total: 328
- Time zone: UTC+6

Erke-Kashka is a village in Aravan District, Osh Region of Kyrgyzstan. Its population was 328 in 2021.
