= Chapaev, Osh =

Chapaev Чапаев
- Location within Kyrgyzstan
- Coordinates: 40°16′40″N 72°38′10″E
- Country: Kyrgyzstan
- Region: Osh
- District: Nookat

Population (2021)
  - Total: 10,895
- Time zone: UTC+6

Chapaev (Kyrgyz: Чапаев, Russian: имени Чапаева, romanized: imeni Chapayeva) is a village in Osh Region of Kyrgyzstan. It is part of the Nookat District. Its population was 10,895 in 2021.

== Population ==
Historical population
Year	Pop.	±% p.a.
2009	12,253	—
2021	10,895	−0.97%
Note: resident population; Sources:
