= Besh-Burkan =

Besh-Burkan Беш-Буркан
- Location within Kyrgyzstan
- Coordinates: 40°11′55″N 72°15′0″E
- Country: Kyrgyzstan
- Region: Osh
- District: Nookat
- Elevation: 1,489 m (4,885 ft)

Population (2021)
  - Total: 2,519
- Time zone: UTC+06:00 (KGT)

Besh-Burkan (Kyrgyz: Беш-Буркан) is a village in Osh Region of Kyrgyzstan. It is part of the Nookat District. Its population was 2,519 in 2021.
