= Jar-Kyshtak, Aravan =

Jar-Kyshtak Жар-Кыштак
- Location within Kyrgyzstan
- Coordinates: 40°30′50″N 72°23′20″E
- Country: Kyrgyzstan
- Region: Osh Region
- District: Aravan District
- Elevation: 570 m (1,870 ft)

Population (2021)
  - Total: 938
- Time zone: UTC+6

Jar-Kyshtak (Kyrgyz: Жар-Кыштак, also Жар-Кышлак Jar-Kyshlak) is a village in Aravan District, Osh Region of Kyrgyzstan. Its population was 938 in 2021.
