= Kosh-Döbö, Osh =

Kosh-Döbö Кош-Дөбө
- Location within Kyrgyzstan
- Coordinates: 40°14′32″N 72°17′32″E
- Country: Kyrgyzstan
- Region: Osh Region
- District: Nookat District
- Elevation: 1,350 m (4,430 ft)

Population (2021)
  - Total: 1,192

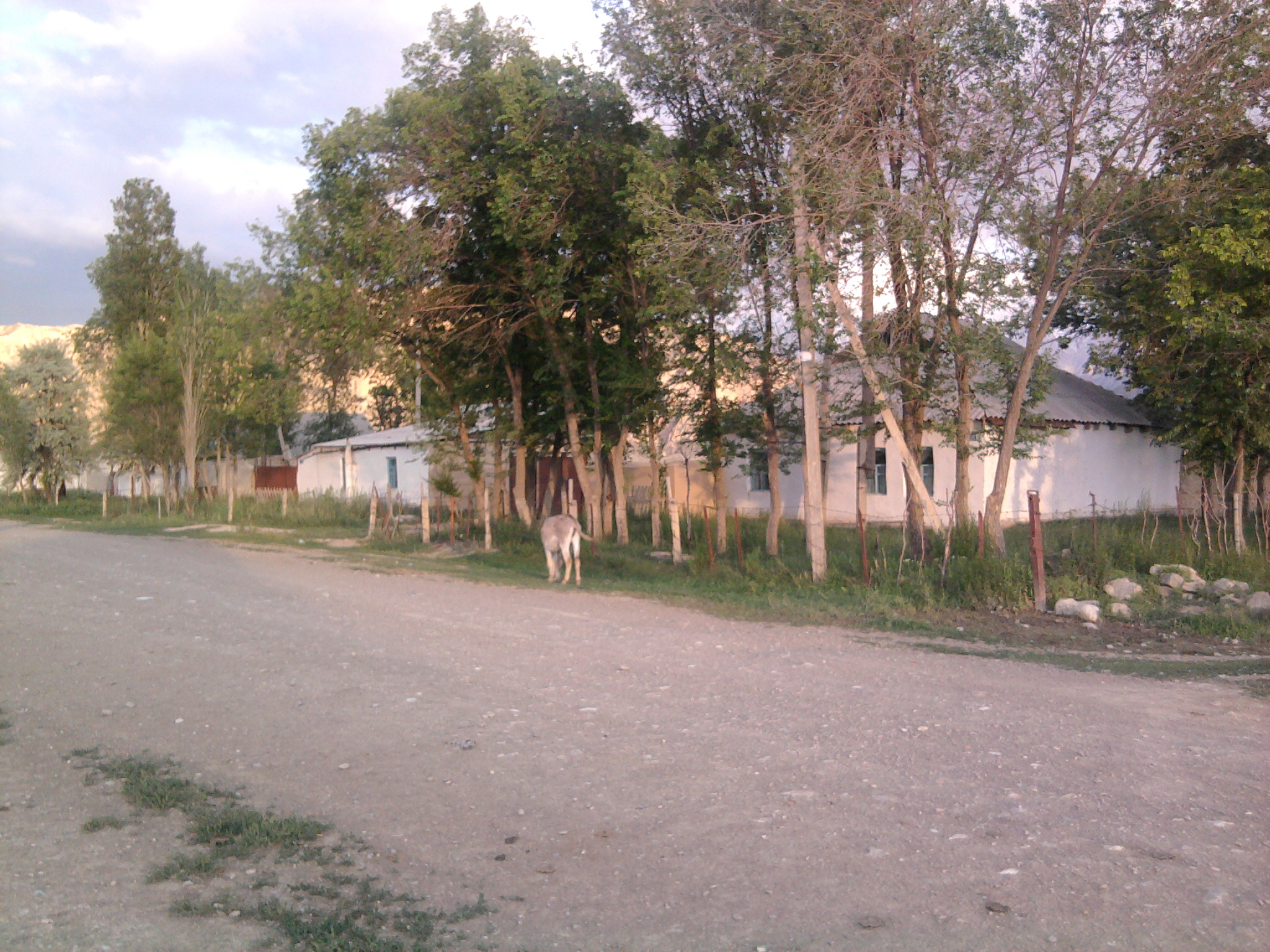
Kosh-Döbö

Kosh-Döbö (or Kosh-Debe) is a village in the Nookat District of Osh Region of Kyrgyzstan. Its population was 1,192 in 2021.
