= League Aravan.kg =

The futsal league in Aravan began playing in April 2014. The league began with 16 teams.

The referees who have FIFA certificates in Asian Football Confederation are Abdigani Tursunaliyev and Bahromjon Burhanov.
