= Daroot-Korgon =

Daroot-Korgon Дароот-Коргон
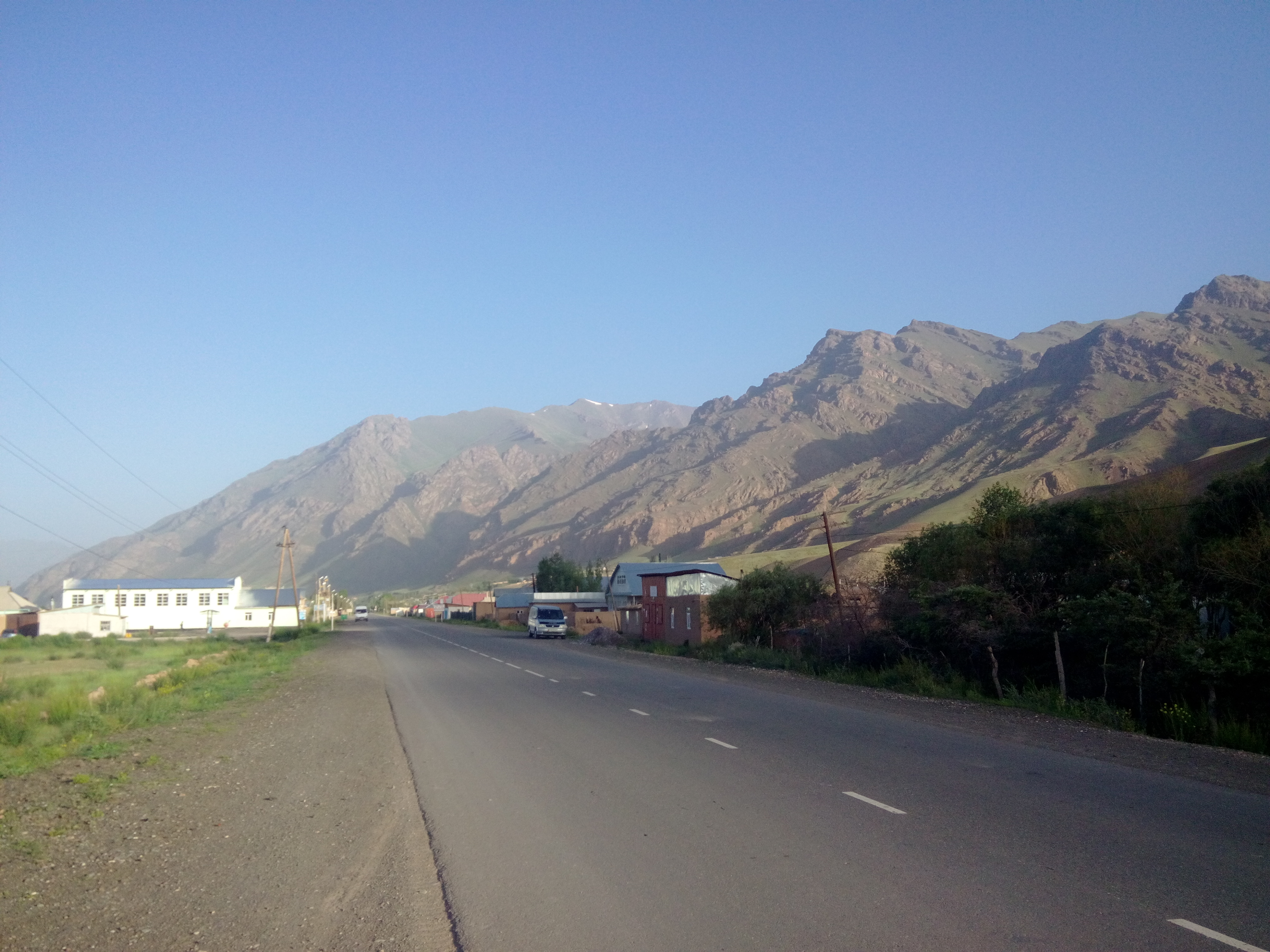

- Location within Kyrgyzstan
- Coordinates: 39°33′12″N 72°12′0″E
- Country: Kyrgyzstan
- Region: Osh
- District: Chong-Alay
- Elevation: 2,469 m (8,100 ft)

Population (2021)
  - Total: 6,421
- Time zone: UTC+6

Daroot-Korgon (also Daraut-Kurghan or Darautkorgon or Daroot-Qurghan) is a village in the western Alay Valley of Osh Region, Kyrgyzstan. It is the capital of Chong-Alay District. Its population was 6,421 in 2021. It is about 90 km west of Sary-Tash on the river Kyzyl-Suu. To the north is a route to Osh via the Tengizbay pass, used by Russian explorers before the construction of the road though Sary-Tash.

To the south, the Altyn River flows north through a deep valley in the Trans-Alay Range. At the head of the valley is a Tajik border post and then Altyn Mazar on the river Muksu which flows west to join the Kyzyl-Suu. South of this is the foot of the Fedchenko Glacier.

The village of Kara-Shybak is 3 km (2 mi) to the south, and Kyzyl-Eshme is 5 km (3 mi) to the east.

Aurel Stein suggested that this was the location of the "Stone Tower" that Ptolemy in his famous treatise Geography wrote as the place where caravans from the Chinese and Roman Empires met and exchanged goods. Other scholars, however, disagree with this identification, though it remains one of four most probable sites for the Stone Tower.

== Population ==
Historical population
Year	Pop.	±% p.a.
2009	4,726	—
2021	6,421	+2.59%
Note: resident population; Sources:

In the Book of Han (2nd century AD), the population of this town, situated in the Alai Valley, is recorded at the time as 1,030.

Many Pamir Kyrgyz have resettled from Afghanistan to Daroot-Korgon in the 21st century, straining the village's resources.
