= Ak-Bulak, Osh =

Ak-Bulak Ак-Булак
- Location within Kyrgyzstan
- Coordinates: 40°12′30″N 72°42′00″E
- Country: Kyrgyzstan
- Region: Osh Region
- District: Nookat District
- Elevation: 1,708 m (5,604 ft)

Population (2021)
  - Total: 6,773
- Time zone: UTC+6

Ak-Bulak (Kyrgyz: Ак-Булак) is a village in Osh Region of Kyrgyzstan. It is part of the Nookat District. Its population was 6,773 in 2021.

== Population ==
Historical population
Year	Pop.	±% p.a.
2009	5,263	—
2021	6,773	+2.12%
Note: resident population; Sources:
