= Kyzyl-Eshme =

Kyzyl-Eshme Кызыл-Эшме
- Location within Kyrgyzstan
- Coordinates: 39°33′36″N 72°15′36″E
- Country: Kyrgyzstan
- Region: Osh Region
- District: Chong-Alay District
- Elevation: 2,579 m (8,461 ft)

Population (2021)
  - Total: 1,532
- Time zone: UTC+6

Kyzyl-Eshme is a village in Osh Region of Kyrgyzstan. It is part of the Chong-Alay District. Its population was 1,532 in 2021.

The village Daroot-Korgon is 3 miles (5 km) to the west.
