= Surprise cave =

Cave in Kyrgyzstan

The 450-metre-long Surprise cave (Kyrgyz: Сюрприз үңкүрү, romanized: Syurpriz üngkürü) is a cave on the right (east) side of the Dangi Canyon in the Nookat District in Kyrgyzstan. A small round opening in the wall of the canyon leads to an underground gallery decorated with crystals and stalactites.
