= Achyk-Suu =

- Location within Kyrgyzstan
- Coordinates: 39°28′11″N 72°29′55″E
- Country: Kyrgyzstan
- Region: Osh Region
- District: Chong-Alay District
- Elevation: 3,050 m (10,010 ft)

Population (2021)
  - Total: 2,686

Achyk-Suu is a village in Chong-Alay District of Osh Region of Kyrgyzstan. Its population was 2,686 in 2021.
