= Jason Erkes =

American journalist and producer

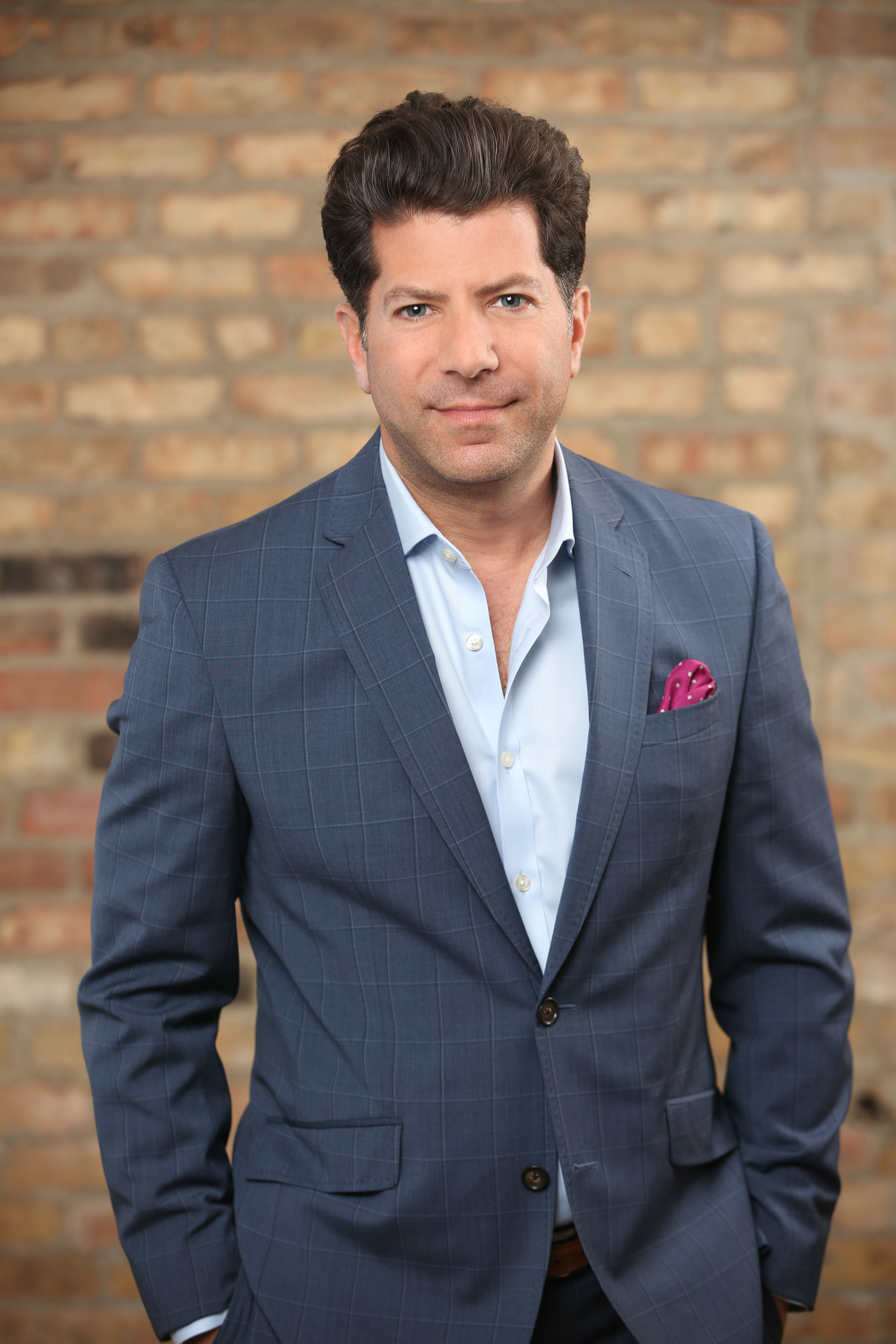
- Occupations: Communications Strategist, AI Trainer, Entrepreneur
- Years active: 1990s-present
- Website: JasonErkes.com

Jason Erkes is an American businessman and former journalist. He is the founder of PromptedComms, an public relations firm.

Jason Erkes was a political researcher for ABC7 Chicago in the 1990s, and a special assistant to Illinois Attorney General Roland Burris. He joined Fox Chicago News in 1995 as a producer, winning an Emmy Award in 1997, and stayed until 2001.

From 2001 to 2015, Erkes co-owned and served as president of the Chicago Sport and Social Club.

== Career ==
=== Media and Political career ===
Erkes began his career in journalism as a political researcher for ABC 7 Chicago, covering President Bill Clinton's 1992 election and inauguration. He then served as a special assistant to Illinois Attorney General Roland Burris, managing state initiatives.

Erkes later returned to WFLD (Fox Chicago News) as a field and investigative producer. He covered the Daley and Ryan administrations, national political conventions from 1996 to 2000, and the impeachment of Bill Clinton. In 1997, he won an Emmy Award for producing coverage of Cardinal Joseph Bernardin's funeral, and in 2001.

As a side venture, Erkes developed an entrepreneurial product supporting Joe Lieberman's 2003 political campaign and launched the political campaign Kippah, Joe Beanie selling thousands across the world. The item was awarded "Campaign product of the year" by the Economist Magazine in the UK.

=== Chicago Sport and Social Club ===
In late 2001, Erkes transitioned from journalism to entrepreneurship, co-purchasing the Chicago Sport and Social Club following the bankruptcy of its parent company during the dot-com bubble crash. Serving as president, he managed the restructuring of the business, expanding its operations and rebuilding its brand presence.

In 2005, Erkes was named to Crain's Chicago Business "40 Under 40" list for turning around the Chicago Sport and Social Club. After acquiring the business in 2001, he scaled back its operations from 22 cities to four key markets: Chicago, San Francisco, Philadelphia, and Orlando.

In 2007, Erkes and his partners brought City Chase, an urban adventure race originating in Toronto, to the United States. By 2013, Erkes managed the Chicago Sport and Social Club, generating 80% of its revenue from league fees along with corporate sponsorships. In 2015, Erkes stepped down as president of the Chicago Sport and Social Club, having grown annual participation to 110,000.

Erkes later transitioned into crisis management and strategic communications, serving as an advisor to Illinois State Representative Ron Sandack during his 2016 resignation. Erkes managed communications for Roland Burris during his controversial 2009 appointment and seating in the U.S. Senate following the impeachment of Governor Rod Blagojevich. For this campaign, Erkes and his associates received a 2010 Reed Award from Campaigns & Elections. He previously served as director of communications for Blair Hull's 2004 U.S. Senate campaign.

Erkes founded the Crisis Strategy Group, providing strategic communications and crisis management consulting for political candidates, pharmaceutical companies, and cannabis industry entrepreneurs.

=== Cresco Labs ===
In 2016, Erkes began consulting in the cannabis industry and contributed articles on crisis management to industry publications. While consulting for Cresco Labs, he assisted in launching a cannabis edible line in collaboration with James Beard Foundation Award-winning chef Mindy Segal. At Cresco Labs, Erkes managed corporate messaging, including a $1 million educational campaign for the Illinois medical cannabis program. Appointed Chief Communications Officer in 2018, he oversaw communications for the company's public listing on the Canadian Securities Exchange, its expansion into Pennsylvania and Ohio, and its sponsorship of the Chicago Marathon. Erkes has also served as an industry spokesperson on state cannabis regulations and medical applications.

=== PromptedComms ===
In 2024, Erkes founded PromptedComms, a consultancy and training practice focused on the integration of generative AI within the public relations and corporate communications sectors and to apply AI tools to existing industry workflows.

== Philanthropy ==
Erkes has been dedicated to a number of fundraising efforts in the city of Chicago. In 2011, he raised money for the Chicago Chargers football team through the 100,000 participants at Chicago Sport and Social Club. He also served on an advisory board for Chicago's bid for the 2016 Olympic Games. He has been a board member of Special Olympics Chicago for many years. Erkes was also a celebrity host of Tickled Pink Chicago.
