= Kashka-Suu, Osh =

Kashka-Suu
- Location within Kyrgyzstan
- Coordinates: 39°38′N 72°40′E
- Country: Kyrgyzstan
- Region: Osh
- District: Chong-Alay

Population (2021)
  - Total: 3,468
- Time zone: UTC+6

Kashka-Suu is a village in Osh Region of Kyrgyzstan. It is part of the Chong-Alay District. Its population was 3,468 in 2021.

There is a ski resort in Kashka-Suu with a chairlift and a tow lift.

== Climate ==
The climate is moderately continental with warm summers and moderately cold winters. The warmest month of the year is July (March), the coldest is January (February).

Map of the ski resort. Top: Length of chairlift, chairlift speed, height difference. Bottom: Length of the pistes.
