= Äitei, Almaty =

Äitei Әйтей
- Village
- Location within Kazakhstan
- Coordinates: 43°13′56″N 76°35′52.8″E
- Country: Kazakhstan
- Region: Almaty
- District: Karasay

Population (2013)
  - Total: 5,746
- Time zone: UTC+6 (Almaty)

Äitei (Kazakh: Әйтей), known as Internatsional (Интернационал) until 1992, is a village in the Karasay District of the Almaty Region in Kazakhstan. It is located about 5 km northwest of Kaskelen.
