= Kara-Koktu =

Kara-Koktu Кара-Кокту
- Location within Kyrgyzstan
- Coordinates: 40°21′0″N 72°36′36″E
- Country: Kyrgyzstan
- Region: Osh Region
- District: Nookat District
- Elevation: 1,104 m (3,622 ft)

Population (2021)
  - Total: 916
- Time zone: UTC+6

Kara-Koktu is a village in Osh Region of Kyrgyzstan. It is part of the Nookat District. Its population was 916 in 2021.
