= Mangyt =

Mangyt Мангыт
- Location within Kyrgyzstan
- Coordinates: 40°27′0″N 72°34′12″E
- Country: Kyrgyzstan
- Region: Osh Region
- District: Aravan District
- Elevation: 899 m (2,949 ft)

Population (2021)
  - Total: 2,837
- Time zone: UTC+6

Mangyt is a village in the Aravan District, Osh Region of Kyrgyzstan. Its population was 2,837 in 2021.
