= Jangy-Nookat =

Jangy-Nookat Жаңы-Ноокат
- Location within Kyrgyzstan
- Coordinates: 40°15′0″N 72°33′0″E
- Country: Kyrgyzstan
- Region: Osh Region
- District: Nookat District
- Elevation: 1,466 m (4,810 ft)

Population (2021)
  - Total: 26,311
- Time zone: UTC+6

Jangy-Nookat is a town in Osh Region of Kyrgyzstan. It is part of the Nookat District. Its population (including the villages Döng-Kyshtak, Jandama, Katta-Tal, Künggöy-Khasana, Monchok-Döbö and Teskey) was 26,311 in 2021.

== Population ==
Historical population
Year	Pop.	±% p.a.
2009	21,049	—
2021	26,311	+1.88%
Note: resident population; Sources:
