= Nookat =

Nookat Ноокат
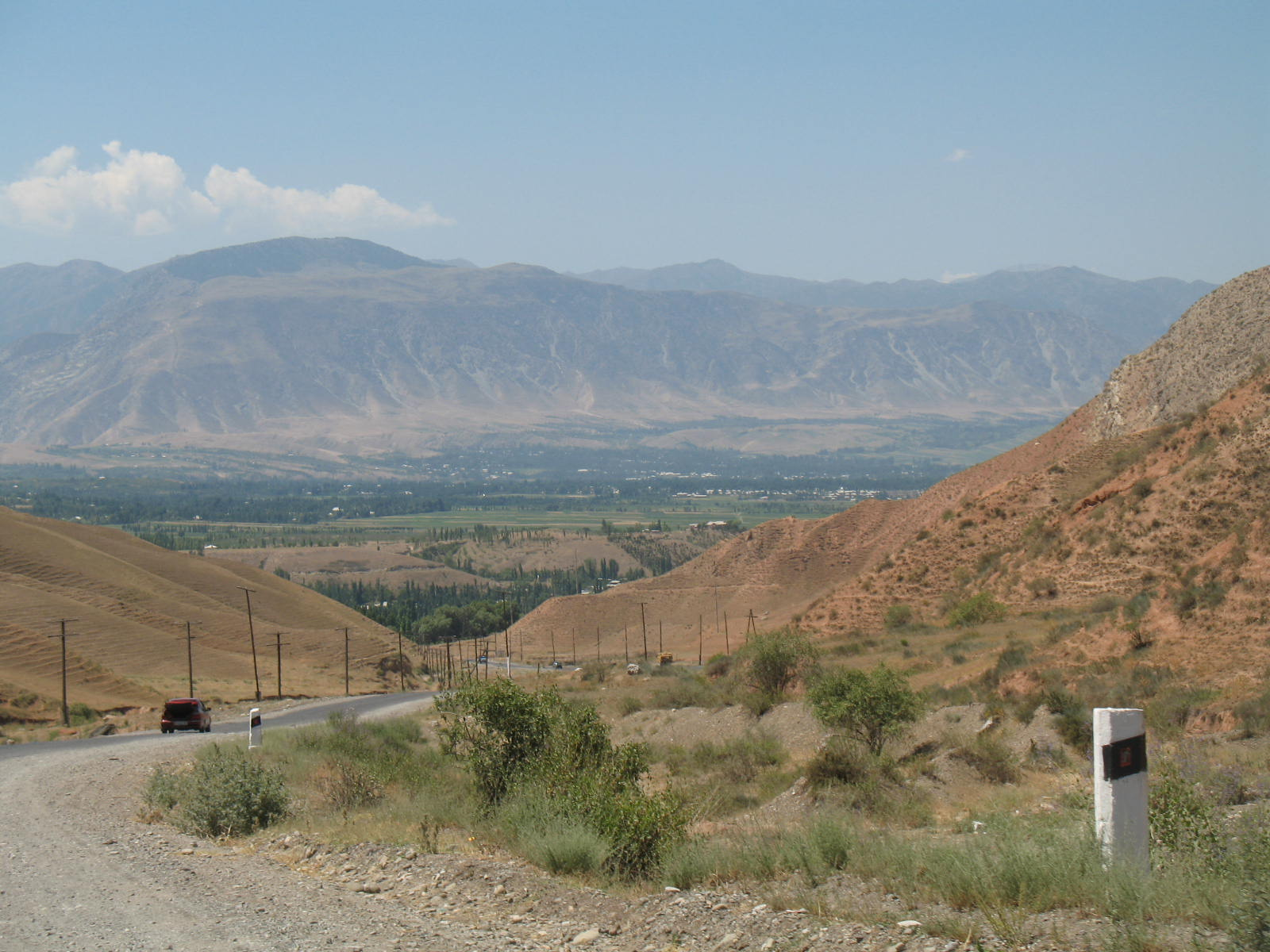
- Nookat from the north

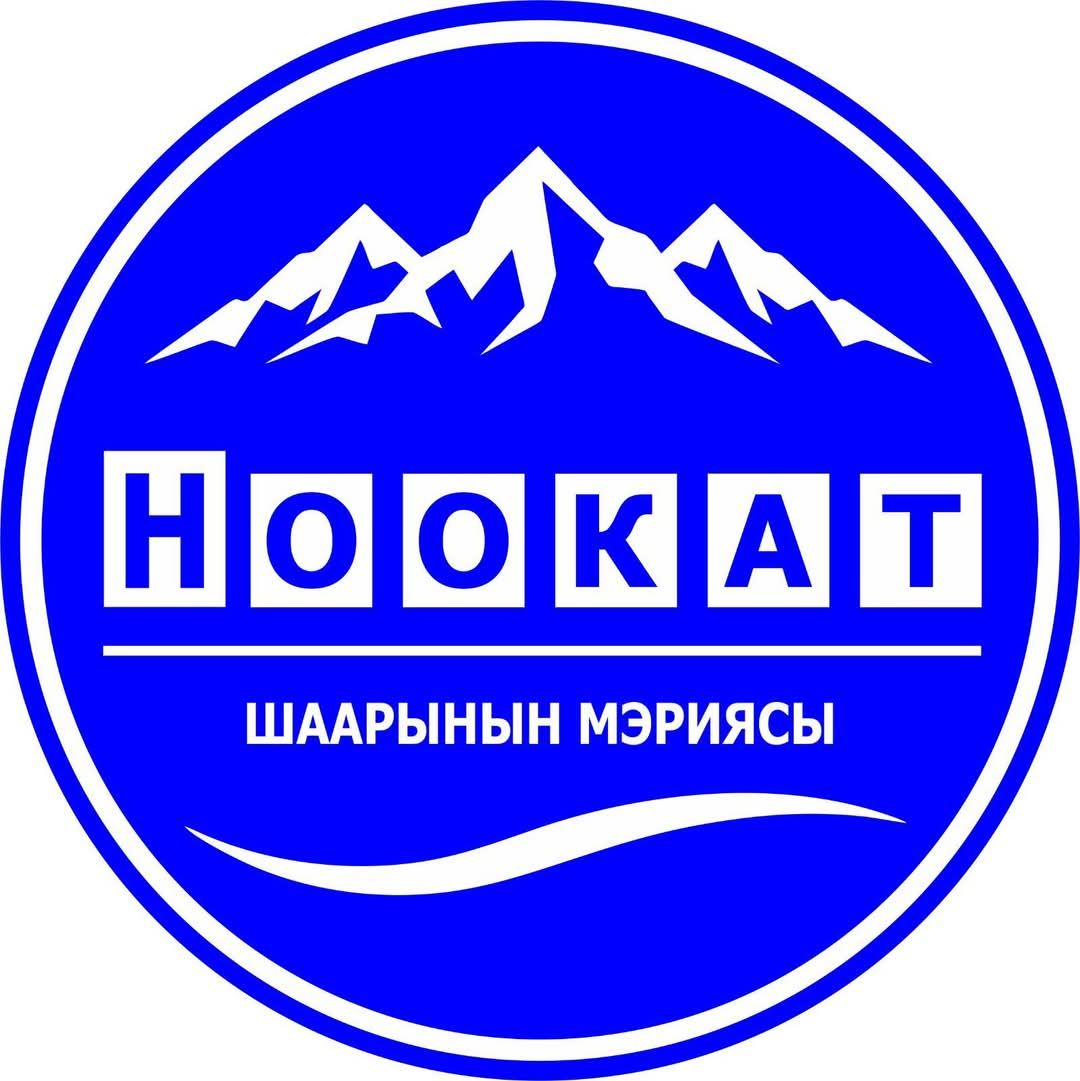
- Coat of arms

- Location within Kyrgyzstan
- Coordinates: 40°15′57″N 72°37′05″E
- Country: Kyrgyzstan
- Region: Osh Region
- Elevation: 1,296 m (4,252 ft)

Population (2021)
  - Total: 18,228
- Time zone: UTC+6

Nookat (Kyrgyz: Ноокат), also Eski-Nookat, Iski-Naukat or Naukat, is a city in Osh Region of Kyrgyzstan. It is the seat of Nookat District. Its population was 18,228 in 2021.

The main street, Soltobaev, forms part of the main Osh-Batken highway and is consequently very dusty and busy, lined by willow, poplar and plane trees.

Nookat came to signify the repression during the Kurmanbek Bakiyev regime as villagers were imprisoned, tortured and sentenced to lengthy prison terms following civil unrest in the fall of 2008. Following the revolt in April 2010, the villagers, of the Uzbek minority, were released.

== Population ==
Historical population
Year	Pop.	±% p.a.
2009	14,371	—
2021	18,228	+2.00%
Note: resident population; Sources:
