= Nookat District =

Coordinates: 40°16′0″N 72°37′6″E

Nookat Ноокат району
- District
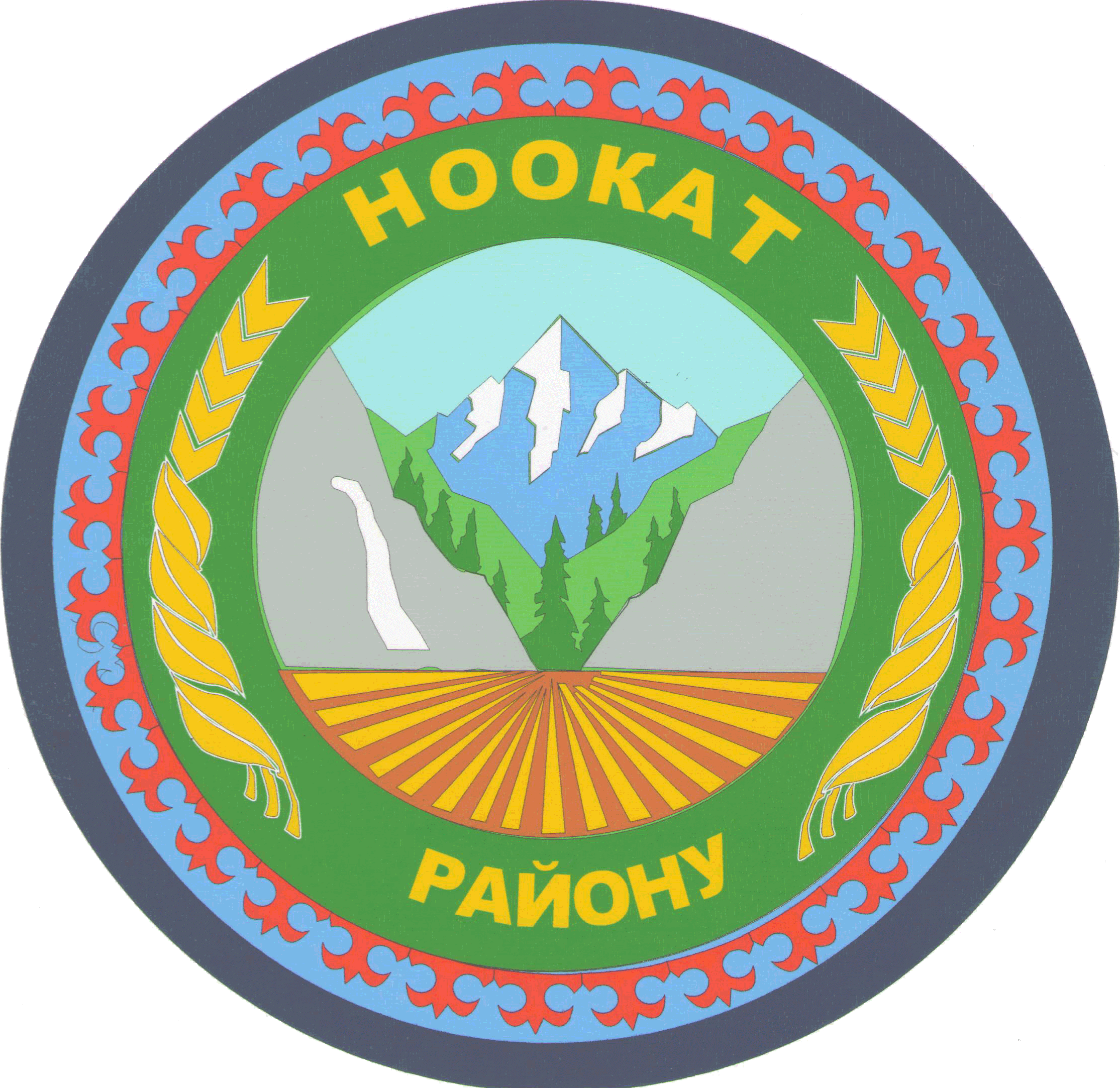
- Flag Coat of arms

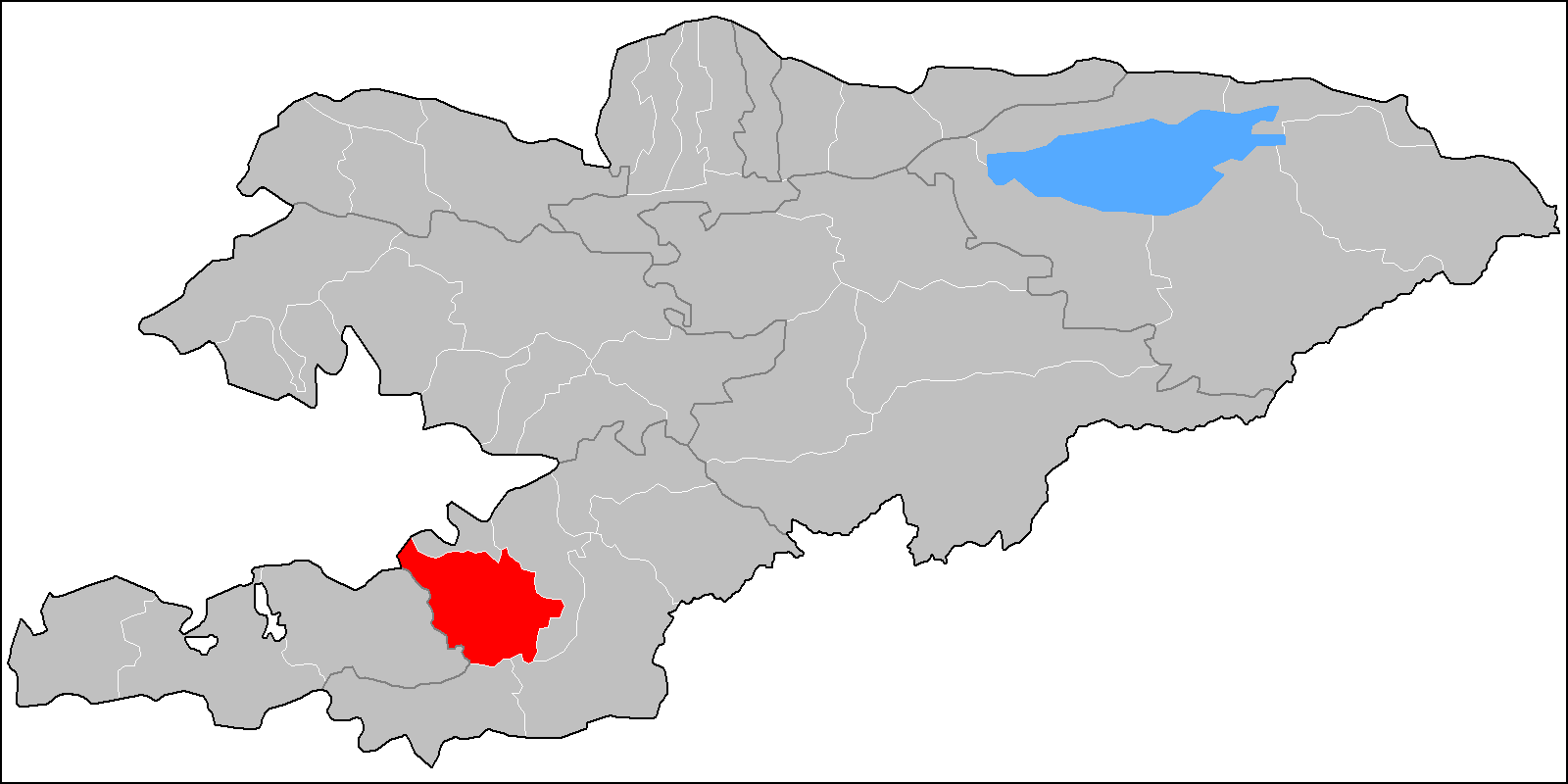
- Country: Kyrgyzstan
- Region: Osh Region

Area
  - Total: 3,179 km^{2} (1,227 sq mi)

Population (2021)
  - Total: 302,481
  - Density: 95.15/km^{2} (246.4/sq mi)
- Time zone: UTC+6

Nookat (Kyrgyz: Ноокат району, also: Naukat) is a district of Osh Region in south-western Kyrgyzstan. Its area is 3,179 square kilometres (1,227 sq mi), and its resident population was 302,481 in 2021. The administrative seat lies at Nookat.

== Demographics ==
The population of Nookat District, according to the Population and Housing Census of 2009, was 236,455. 16,125 people live in urban areas, and 220,330 in rural ones.

Historical populations in Nookat District
Year	Pop.	±% p.a.
1970	76,619	—
1979	108,550	+3.95%
1989	143,476	+2.83%
1999	196,486	+3.19%
2009	236,455	+1.87%
2021	302,481	+2.07%
Note: resident population; Sources:

=== Ethnic composition ===
According to the 2009 Census, the ethnic composition of the Nookat District (de jure population) was:

Ethnic group	Population	Proportion of Nookat District population
Kyrgyzs	173,920	73.6%
Uzbeks	61,299	25.9%
Khemshils	276	0.1%
Turks	267	0.1%
Russians	241	0.1%
Tatars	123	0.1%
other groups	329	0.1%

=== Towns, rural communities and villages ===
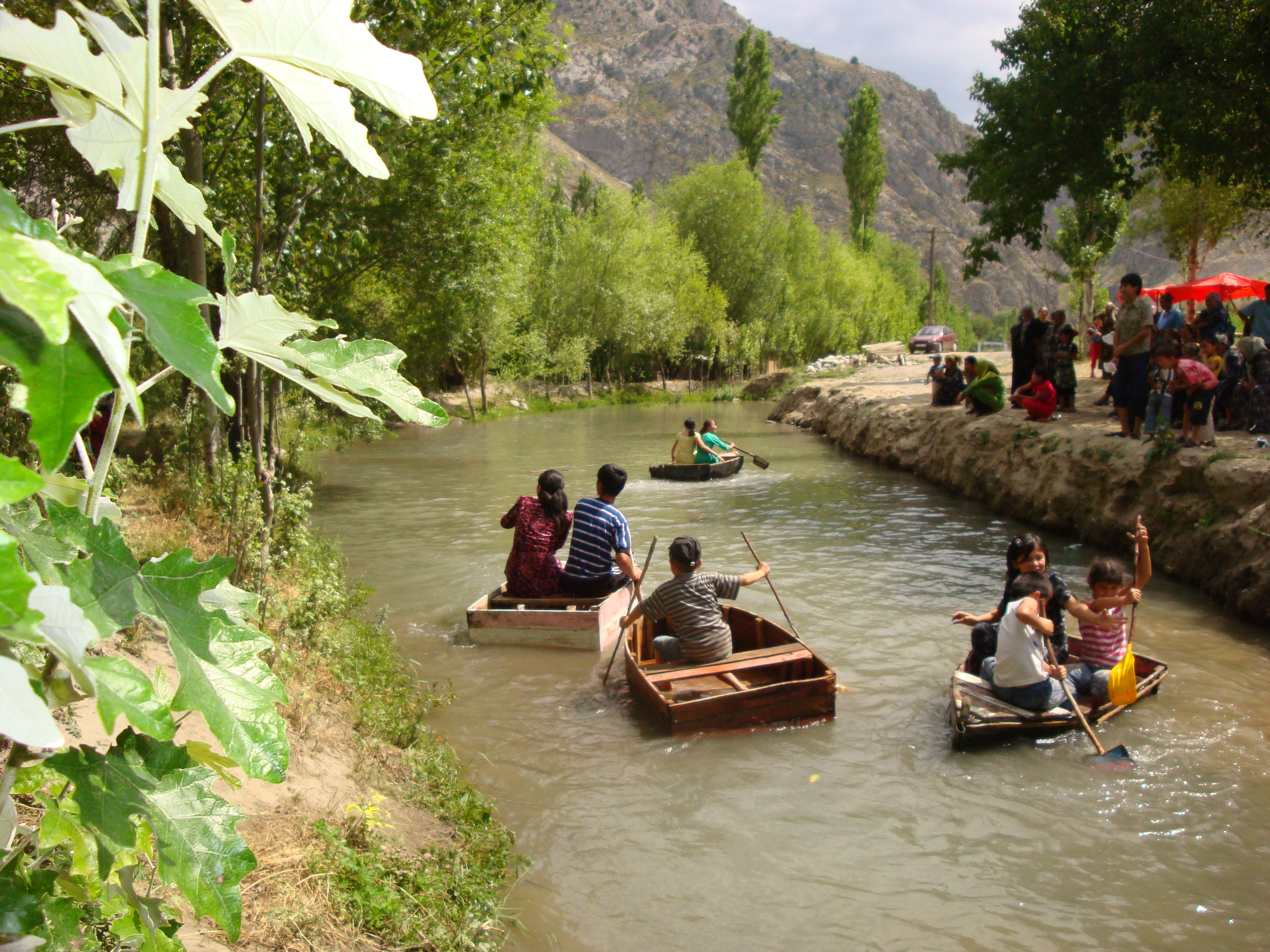
village Sahaba

In total, Nookat District includes 1 town and 97 settlements in 16 rural communities (ayyl aymagy). Each rural community can consist of one or several villages. The rural communities and settlements in the Nookat District are:

1. town Nookat
2. Bel (seat: Bel; incl. Kayragach, Jash and Tash-Bulak)
3. Gülstan (seat: Frunze; incl. Gülstan, Besh-Korgon, Boston and Chong-Kyshtoo)
4. Isanov (seat: Jangy-Bazar; incl. Jar-Korgon, Fedorov, Chech-Döbö, Kojoke and Kichik-Alay)
5. Jangy-Nookat (seat: Jangy-Nookat; incl. Kyzyl-Teyit, Temir-Koruk, Döng-Kyshtak, Jandama, Katta-Tal, Künggöy-Khasana, Monchok-Döbö and Teskey)
6. Kara-Tash (seat: Kara-Tash; incl. Noygut)
7. Kengesh (seat: Kuu-Maydan; incl. Ak-Terek, Arbyn, Chegeden, Shankol, Bayysh, Batuu and Dary-Bulak)
8. Kök-Bel (seat: Kök-Bel; incl. Kayyndy)
9. Kulatov (seat: Kojo-Aryk; incl. Ak-Chal, Baglan, Kosh-Döbö, Kyzyl-Bulak, Abshyr-Ata, Aryk-Teyit and Kulushtan)
10. Kyrgyz-Ata (seat: Kötörmö; incl. Borko, Kara-Oy, Kara-Tash, Kyrgyz-Ata, Tash-Bulak and Ak-Bulak)
11. Kyzyl-Oktyabr (seat: Kök-Jar; incl. Alashan, Borbash, Jiyde, Karanay and Sarykandy)
12. Mirmakhmudov (seat: Chapaev; incl. Aral, Baryn, Budaylyk, Kapchygay and Kara-Koktu)
13. Nayman (seat: Nayman; incl. Uluu-Too)
14. On Eki-Bel (seat: On Eki-Bel; incl. Naray, Myrza-Nayman, On-Eki-Moynok and Örnök)
15. Toktomat Zulpuev (seat: Üch-Bay; incl. Aybek, Ak-Chabuu, Internatsional, Karake, Kommunizm, Ösör, Tashtak, Chuchuk and Yatan)
16. Töölös (seat: Murkut; incl. Ay-Tamga, Gerey-Shoron, Jayylma, Dodon, Kengesh, Merkit, Tolman and Kara-Kechit)
17. Yntymak (seat: Yntymak; incl. Besh-Burkan, Aryk-Boyu, Döng Maala, Akshar, Tash-Bulak, Chelekchi and Nichke-Suu)
Settlements of the Nookat District.
Abbreviations: B - Boston, BK - Besh-Korgon, DK - Döng-Kyshtak, F - Frunze, G - Gülstan, JN - Jangy-Nookat, I - Internatsional, K - Kommunizm, KK - Kara-Kechit, KM - Kuu-Maydan, KT - Katta-Tal, T - Tashtak, TK - Temir-Koruk.
