= Aravan District =

Coordinates: 40.5151°N 72.4986°E

Aravan Араван району
- District
- Coat of arms

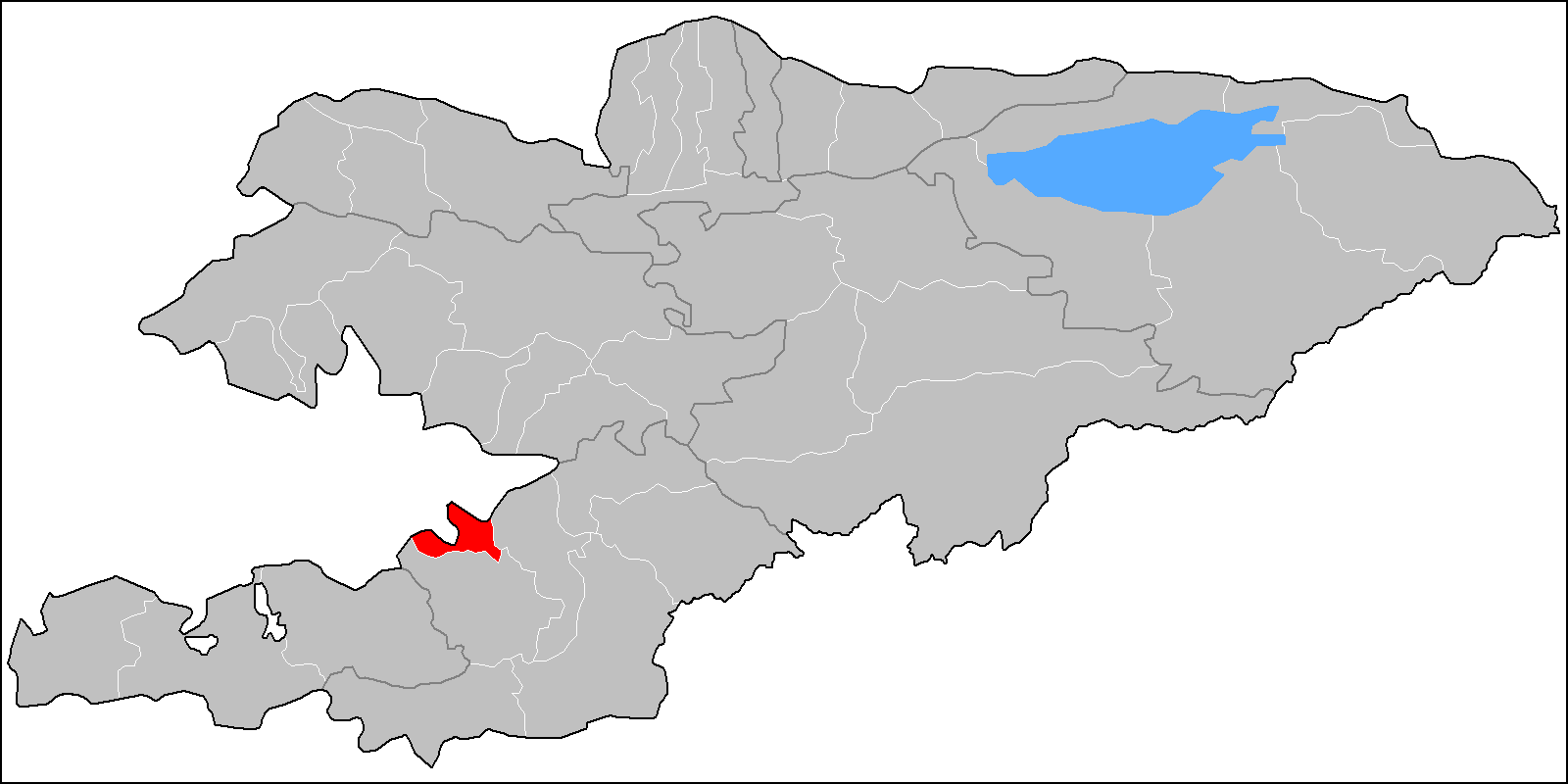
- Country: Kyrgyzstan
- Region: Osh Region

Area
  - Total: 1,340 km^{2} (520 sq mi)

Population (2021)
  - Total: 137,721
  - Density: 103/km^{2} (266/sq mi)
- Time zone: UTC+6

Aravan (Kyrgyz: Араван району) is a district of Osh Region in south-western Kyrgyzstan. The administrative seat lies at Aravan. Its area is 1,340 square kilometres (520 sq mi) (making it the smallest district in Osh Region), and its resident population was 137,721 in 2021.

== Geography ==
The district lies in the south-east part of the Fergana Valley. It borders with the Chil'-Ustun Range in the north-east, and with the Keklik-Too mountains in the east. In the south, the district is occupied by the Jalgyz-Archa and the Ulu-Too mountains. In the west, it borders with Kerkidon reservoir. In the north, the topography of the area is flat, and in the south it rises, changing to hilly terrain. The difference in absolute elevations from north to south is 500-750 meters.

== Demographics ==
As of 2009, Aravan District contained 48 villages.

Historical populations in Aravan District
Year	Pop.	±% p.a.
1970	43,894	—
1979	53,220	+2.16%
1989	71,214	+2.96%
1999	91,438	+2.53%
2009	106,134	+1.50%
2021	137,721	+2.19%
Note: resident population; Sources:

=== Ethnic composition ===
According to the 2009 Census, the ethnic composition of the Aravan District (de jure population) was:

Ethnic group	Population	Proportion of Aravan District population
Uzbeks	62,281	58.7%
Kyrgyzs	42,049	39.6%
Azerbaijanis	760	0.7%
Tajiks	542	0.5%
Tatars	135	0.1%
other groups	367	0.4%

=== Rural communities and villages ===
In total, Aravan District include 50 settlements in 8 rural communities (ayyl aymagy). Each rural community can consist of one or several villages. The rural communities in Aravan District are:

1. Аllya Anarov (seat: Jangy-Aravan; incl. Aravan, Achchy, Kara-Bulak, Sasyk-Üngkür, Madaniyat and Pakhta-Abad)
2. Chek-Abad (seat: Köchübaev; incl. Agronom, Jakshylyk, Jar-Kyshtak, Kukalapash, Maksim-Tobu, Pakhtachy and Tölöykön)
3. Kerme-Too (seat: Gulbakhor; incl. Kichik-Alay, Kündölük, Maydan-Tal, Ming-Teke, Sary-Bulak and Chogom)
4. Mangyt (seat: Mangyt; incl. Kesek, Kyzyl-Korgon, Tölöykön and Jangy-Aryk)
5. Nurabad (seat: Kayragach-Aryk; incl. Kakyr-Piltan and Langar)
6. S.Yusupov (seat: Aravan; incl. Karrak, Oktyabr, Erke-Kashka and Sutkor)
7. Tepe-Korgon (seat: Tepe-Korgon; incl. Arap, Internatsional, Kesov, Uygur-Abad, Chertik, Yangi-Abad and Yangi-Yul)
8. Töö-Moyun (seat: Khauz; incl. Ak-Shor, Jeke-Miste, Kerkidan, Nayman, Sary-Tash and Syrt)
Settlements of the Aravan District
Abbreviations: MT - Maksim-Tobu, T - Tölöykön
