= Osh Region =

Region of Kyrgyzstan

Osh Region: Ош облусу (Kyrgyz); Ошская область (Russian)
- Region
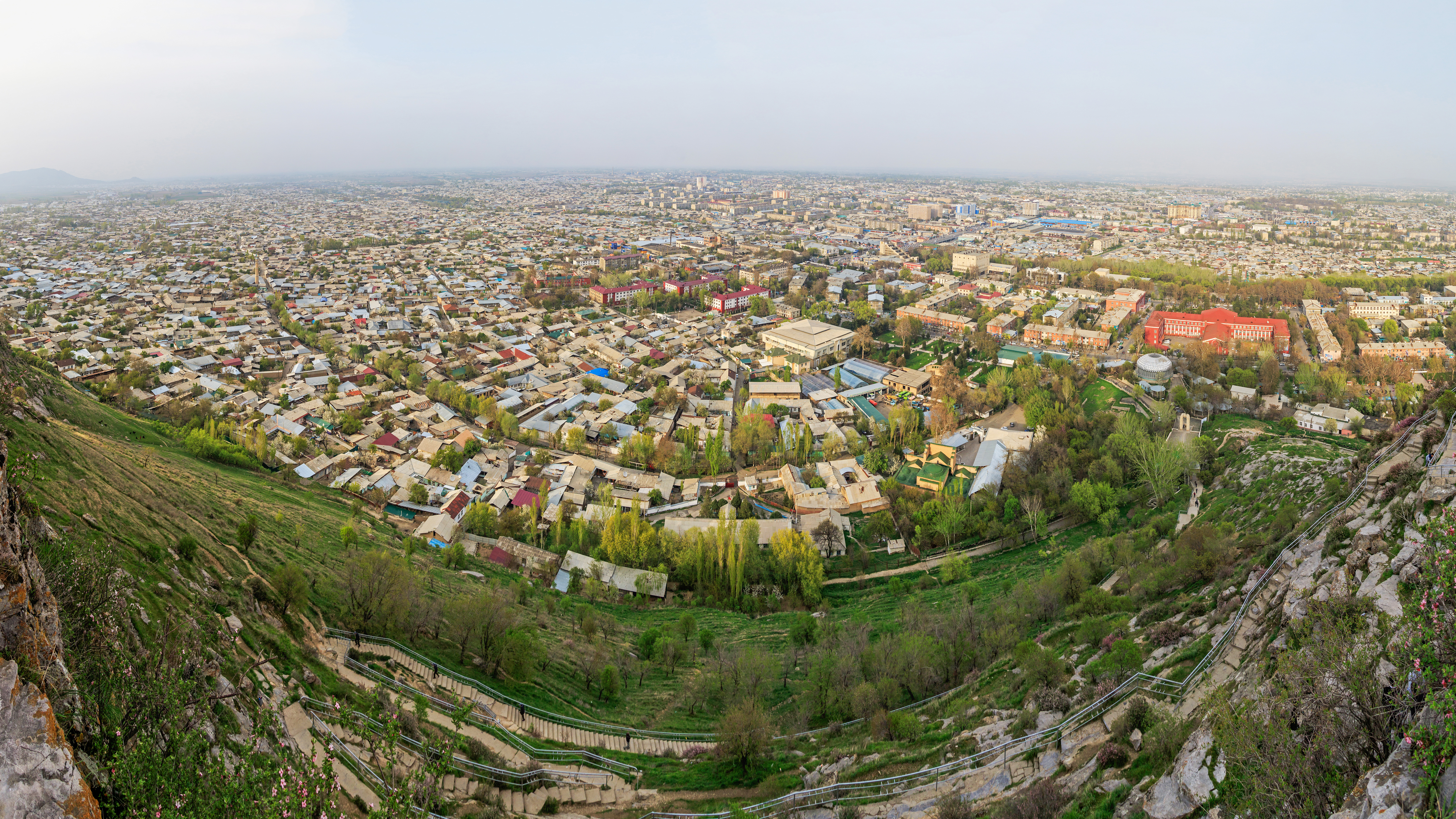
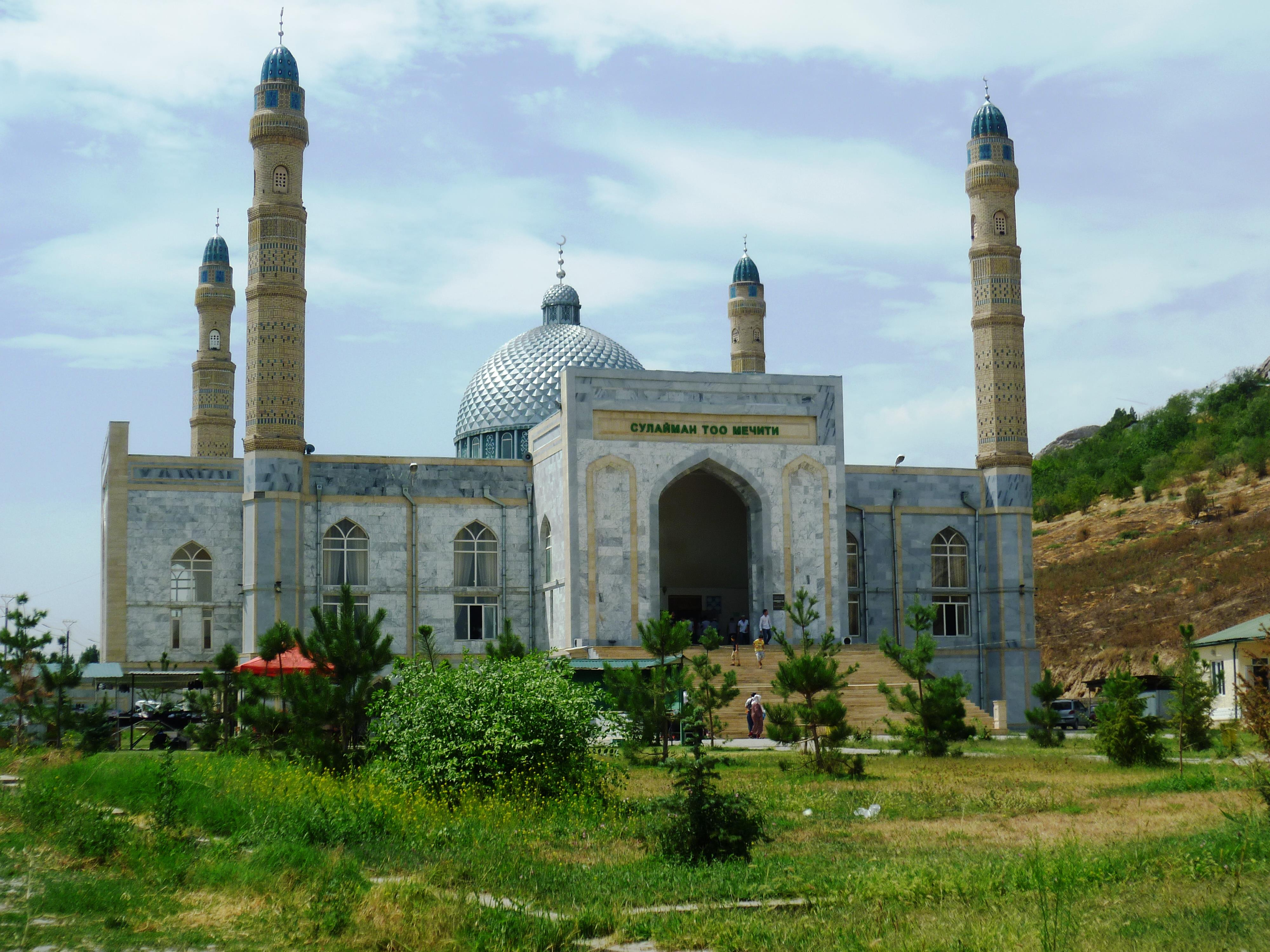
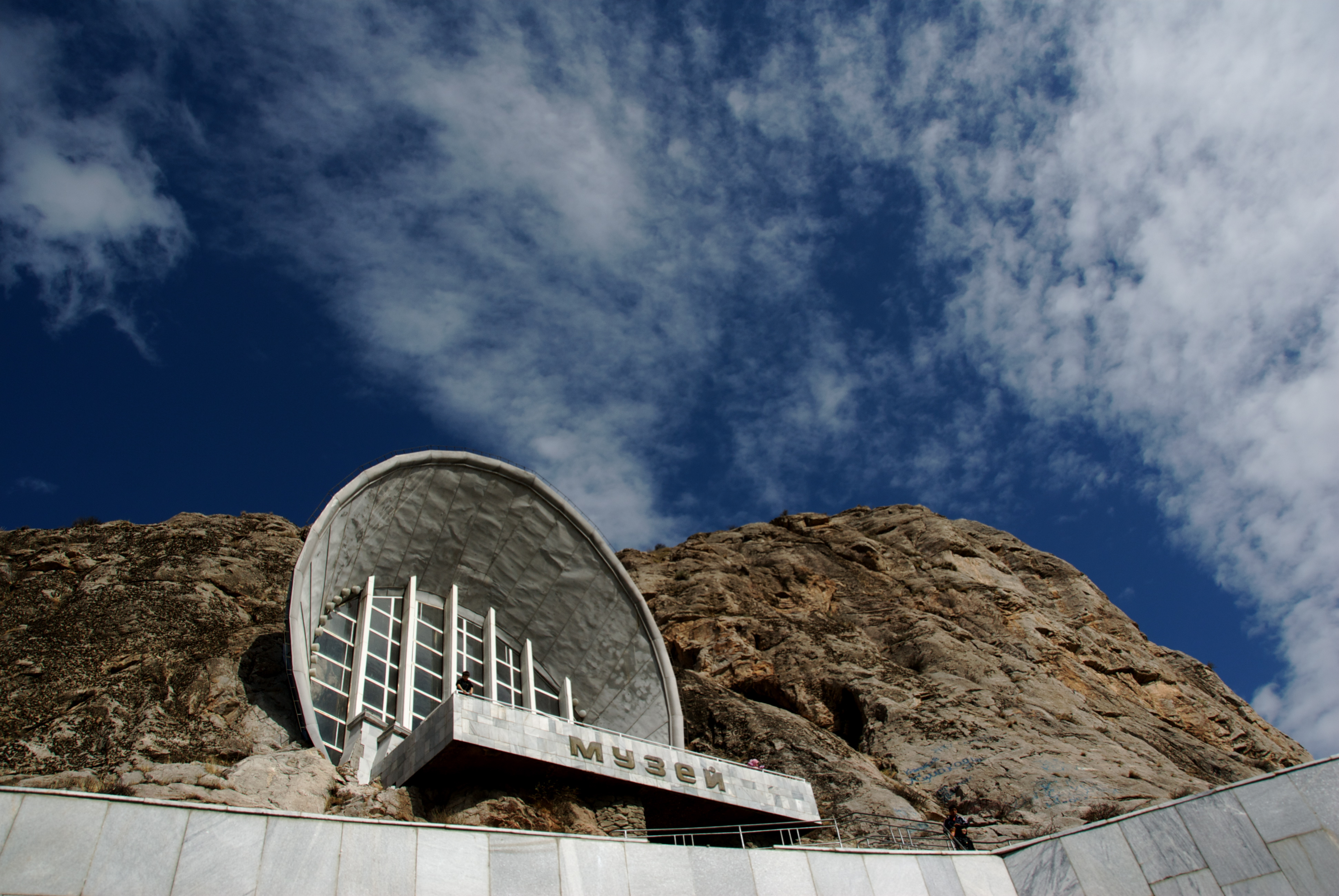
- From the top, View of Osh on Sulayman Mountain, Sulayman-Too Mosque in Osh, National Historical and Archaeological Museum Complex

- Flag Coat of arms

- Map of Kyrgyzstan, location of Osh Region highlighted
- Coordinates: 40°0′N 73°0′E
- Country: Kyrgyzstan
- Capital: Osh

Government
  - Governor: Taalaibek Sarybashev

Area
  - Total: 28,934 km^{2} (11,171 sq mi)

Population (2023-01-01)
  - Total: 1,460,425
  - Density: 50.474/km^{2} (130.73/sq mi)
- Time zone: UTC+6 (KGT)
- ISO 3166 code: KG-O
- Districts: 7
- Cities: 3
- Villages: 474

Osh (Note: Kyrgyz: Ош облусу, romanized: Osh oblusu, IPA: [oʂ obɫʊˈsʊ]; Russian: Ошская область, romanized: Ošskaja oblastj, IPA: [ˈoʂskəjə ˈobɫəsʲtʲ]; Uzbek: Ўш вилояти, romanized: Oʻsh viloyati, IPA: [ˈɵʃ ʋɪlɒjæˈtʰɪ]) is a region of Kyrgyzstan. Its capital is Osh, an independent city mostly surrounded by but not part of the region. It is bounded (clockwise) by Jalal-Abad Region, Naryn Region, China (Xinjiang), Tajikistan (Districts under Central Government Jurisdiction and Gorno-Badakhshan Autonomous Region), Batken Region, and Uzbekistan (Andijan and Fergana Regions). Its total area is 28,934 km^{2} (11,171 sq mi). The resident population of the region was 1,391,649 as of January 2021. According to the 2009 census, 28% of the total population are ethnic Uzbeks.

== Geography ==
Most of the population lives in the flat northern part of the region, on the edge of the Fergana Valley. The land gradually rises southward to the crest of the Alay Mountains, drops into the Alay Valley and rises to the Trans-Alai Range which forms the border with Tajikistan. In the east, the land rises to the Ferghana Range, roughly parallel to the Naryn border. This area is drained by the Kara Darya which flows northwest to join the Naryn to form the Syr Darya in the Ferghana Valley.

Highway M41 goes south over the mountains from Osh to the Tajik border. At Sary-Tash a branch goes east to the Chinese border crossing at Irkeshtam. The other main road goes west through the flat country to Batken Region.

== Divisions ==
The Osh Region is divided administratively into seven districts:

District	Seat	Map
Alay District	Gülchö	
Aravan District	Aravan	
Chong-Alay District	Daroot-Korgon	
Kara-Kulja District	Kara-Kulja	
Kara-Suu District	Kara-Suu	
Nookat District	Nookat	
Özgön District	Özgön	

Kara-Suu, Nookat and Özgön are cities of district significance. There are no urban-type settlements in the region.

== Demographics ==
The resident population of Osh Region, according to the Population and Housing Census of 2009, was 1,104,248. Of these, 87,824 people live in urban areas, and 1,016,424 in rural ones. The official population estimate for the beginning of 2021 was 1,391,649.

Historical populations in Osh Region
Year	Pop.	±%
1970	433,029	—
1979	554,480	+28.0%
1989	712,643	+28.5%
1999	943,566	+32.4%
2009	1,104,248	+17.0%
2021	1,391,649	+26.0%
Note: resident population; Sources:

=== Ethnic composition ===
The largest ethnic minority group in Osh Region is Uzbeks, forming 28% of the regional population (308,688 people) according to the 2009 census. In 2009, 40% of all Kyrgyzstan's Uzbeks lived in Osh Region. According to the 2009 Census, the ethnic composition of the Osh Region (resident population) was:

Ethnic group	Population	Proportion of population
Kyrgyzs	758,036	68.6%
Uzbeks	308,688	28.0%
Uygurs	11,181	1.0%
Turks	10,934	1.0%
Tajiks	6,711	0.6%
Azerbaijanis	3,224	0.3%
Russians	1,552	0.1%
Tatars	1,337	0.1%
Dungans	793	0.1%
other groups	1,792	0.2%

== Enclaves and exclaves ==
Kyrgyzstan's only exclave within Uzbekistan is administratively part of Osh Region (Kara-Suu District). This is the tiny village of Barak (population 627) in the Fergana valley, located on the road from Osh (Kyrgyzstan) to Xoʻjaobod (Uzbekistan) about 4 km north-west from the Kyrgyz–Uzbek border in the direction of Andijan.
