= List of mountain passes in Kyrgyzstan =

This is a list of mountain passes in Kyrgyzstan.

Name	Elevation	Region	Locations	Separating	Type
Dolon Pass	3,030 metres (9,940 ft)	Naryn Region	Location of Dolon Pass	Songköl Too and Bayduluu Range	road
Torugart Pass	3,752 metres (12,310 ft)	Naryn Region	Location of Torugart Pass	China–Kyrgyzstan border	road
Erkeshtam	2,950 metres (9,680 ft)	Osh Region	Location of Erkeshtam Pass	China–Kyrgyzstan border	road
Taldyk Pass	3,615 metres (11,860 ft)	Osh Region	Location of Taldyk Pass	Alay Mountains	road
Chyiyrchyk Pass	2,389 metres (7,838 ft)	Osh Region		Osh and Gulcha	road
Ak-Beyit Pass	3,236 metres (10,617 ft)	Naryn Region	Location of Ak-Beyit Pass	At-Bashi Valley and Arpa Valley	road
Bedel Pass	4,200 metres (13,800 ft)	Naryn Region	Location of Bedel Pass	China–Kyrgyzstan border	path
Katta Belisynyk Pass	1,324 metres (4,344 ft)	Batken Region	Location of Katta Belisynyk	Belisynyk Range	road
Kyzylart Pass	4,280 metres (14,040 ft)	Osh Region	Location of Kyzylart Pass	Kyrgyzstan–Tajikistan border	road
Töö Ashuu	3,586 metres (11,765 ft)	Chüy Region	Location of Töö Ashuu	Kyrgyz Ala-Too	road
Seok Pass	4,028 metres (13,215 ft)	Naryn Region	Location of Seok Pass	Seok Mountains	road
Tengizbay	3,666 metres (12,028 ft)	Batken Region, Osh Region	Location of Tengizbay	Alay Valley and Fergana Valley	road
Kyzart (pass)	2,664 metres (8,740 ft)	Naryn Region	Location of Kyzart	Kochkor Valley and Jumgal Valley	road
Kara-Buura Pass	3,305 metres (10,843 ft)	Talas Region	Location of Kara-Buura Pass	Talas Valley and Chatkal Valley	road
Chapchyma Pass	2,841 metres (9,321 ft)	Jalal-Abad Region	Location of Chapchyma Pass	Kasan-Say Valley and Chatkal Valley	road
