= Title II weapons =

Class of weapons under the National Firearms Act

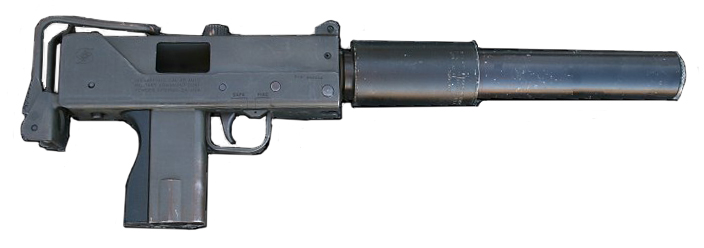
A MAC-10 with a silencer. The silencer is treated as a Title II weapon or NFA firearm itself; the firearm to which the silencer is attached maintains its separate legal status as Title I or Title II. If a silencer is integral to a Title II weapon, such as an SBR, the entire weapon only counts as a single Title II item.

Title II weapons, or NFA firearms, are designations of certain weapons under the United States National Firearms Act (NFA).

These are weapons requiring a Type 01 Federal Firearms License (FFL) as well as a Class 3 Special Occupation Tax (SOT) to sell, and an ATF Form 4 (transfer of registration) with a $200 tax stamp for machine guns and destructive devices and $0 for all other NFA firearms since January 1, 2026, under the One Big Beautiful Bill Act. Also a Type 07 FFL (manufacturer) with a Class 2 Special Occupation Tax is qualified to manufacture, purchase and sell. The restrictions apply to certain firearms, explosive munitions, and other devices which are federally regulated by the NFA. Any violation of the NFA is a felony punishable by up to 10 years in prison. Per the National Rifle Association's Summary of Gun Control Act of 1968:

Title II of the Gun Control Act of 1968 is a revision of the National Firearms Act of 1934, and pertains to machine guns, short or "sawed-off" shotguns and rifles, and so-called "destructive devices" (including grenades, mortars, rocket launchers, large projectiles, and other heavy ordnance). Acquisition of these weapons is subject to prior approval of the Attorney General, and federal registration is required for possession. Generally, a $200 tax is imposed upon each transfer or making of any Title II weapon.

The Bureau of Alcohol, Tobacco, Firearms, and Explosives (ATF), which enforces federal firearms law, refers to such weapons as "NFA firearms". NFA firearms include machine guns, short-barreled rifles and shotguns, heavy weapons, explosive ordnance, silencers and "any other weapon" (AOW), such as disguised or improvised firearms. Title I weapons, or GCA firearms, are standard rifles, shotguns, and handguns.

Explosive devices such as bombs or grenades are regulated as NFA firearms (destructive devices). Explosive materials are not considered NFA firearms; they are regulated under the Organized Crime Control Act.

== Category definitions ==
=== Machine gun ===
A machine gun, as defined in the NFA, is "Any weapon which shoots, is designed to shoot, or can be readily restored to shoot, automatically more than one shot without manual reloading, by a single function of the trigger." The NFA term machine gun refers to all firearms capable of full automatic fire and includes true machine guns, submachine guns, and machine pistols. The frame or receiver of a machine gun, and any combination of parts intended to make a machine gun, is legally defined as a machine gun. For example, according to the ATF, "A Glock Switch is a part which was designed and intended for use in converting a semi-automatic Glock pistol into a machine gun; therefore, it is a "machine gun" as defined in 26 U.S.C. 5845(b)." Open-bolt firearms made after 1982 are considered machine guns due to ease of conversion.

Parts that can be used to convert a semi-automatic firearm to fully automatic capability are regulated as machine guns and must be registered and tax paid under the NFA. The U.S. military issued kits T17 and T18 to convert the M1 carbine to an M2, capable of fully automatic fire; these kits are legally "machine guns".

=== Short-barreled shotgun ===
A short-barreled shotgun (SBS) is defined as:

(1) a shotgun having a smoothbore barrel or barrels of less than 18 inches [46 cm] in length;
(2) a weapon made from a shotgun if such weapon as modified has an overall length of less than 26 inches [66 cm] or a barrel or barrels of less than 18 inches in length [...]

It must be intended to be fired from the shoulder one shell of shot (pellets) or one projectile at a time.

=== Short-barreled rifle ===
A short-barreled rifle (SBR) is defined as:

(3) a rifle having a rifled barrel or barrels of less than 16 inches [41 cm] in length;
(4) a weapon made from a rifle if such weapon as modified has an overall length of less than 26 inches or a barrel or barrels of less than 16 inches in length [...]

A rifle is a firearm designed to be fired from the shoulder and fire one bullet at a time through a rifled barrel. An SBR need not retain a shoulder stock after modification.

ATF regards pistols with shoulder stocks as redesigned to be fired from the shoulder. Modern pistols with shoulder stocks and with barrels less than 16 inches (41 cm) long, or overall length under 26 inches (66 cm), are NFA short-barrelled rifles. ATF has removed some specified stocked handguns (e.g., original Mauser C96 and Luger utilizing an original shoulder stock) from the NFA as collector's items (Curios or Relics List); ATF treats them as pistols under the GCA.

=== Destructive device ===
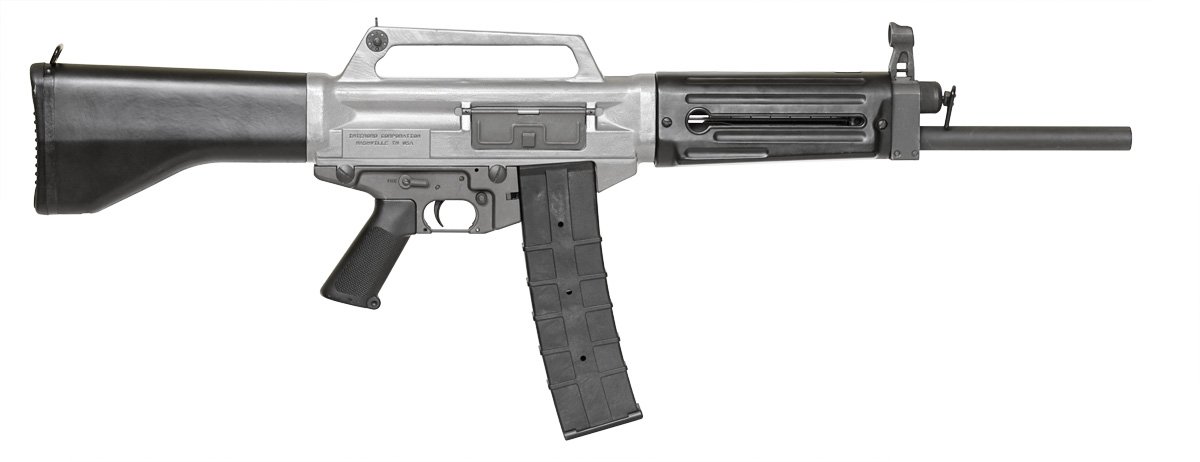
The USAS-12 automatic shotgun is a "destructive device".

There are two categories of destructive devices (DDs):

Explosive ordnance
Any explosive, incendiary, or poison gas, including bombs, grenades, rockets, missiles, mines and similar devices (e.g. grenade launchers, rocket launchers). Parts intended for making such a device are also DDs. Small rockets, with less than 4 ounces (113 grams) of propellant, are exempt.
Large bore firearms
Any projectile weapon with a bore diameter greater than 1/2 inch (50 caliber, 12.7 mm), except for shotguns "generally recognized as particularly suitable for sporting purposes".

Most commercial shotguns have a bore diameter greater than 1/2 inch, but are exempt due to their "sporting purpose"; however, both the Street Sweeper and USAS-12 shotguns, designed for military or police use, were reclassified as DDs when the ATF determined they were combat shotguns not "generally recognized as particularly suitable for sporting purposes".

Devices which are not intended or not likely to be used as a weapon are also exempt. Examples of non-weapon large bore firearms include:

- Line-throwing devices for marine rescue, such as lyle guns and rockets for breeches buoys.
- Civilian flare guns, which fire 37 mm flare caliber (1.46 inch) non-weapon rounds.

Fireworks are non-weapon explosive ordnance.

Flare launchers are normally exempt as they are signalling devices, not weapons; however, possession of a flare launcher and anti-personnel ammunition for it puts it in the DD category as it is then considered to be a weapon.

=== Silencer ===
The legal term silencer, also known as a "suppressor", is defined as "any device for silencing, muffling, or diminishing the report of a portable firearm, including any combination of parts ... intended for use in assembling or fabricating a firearm silencer."

=== Any other weapon ===
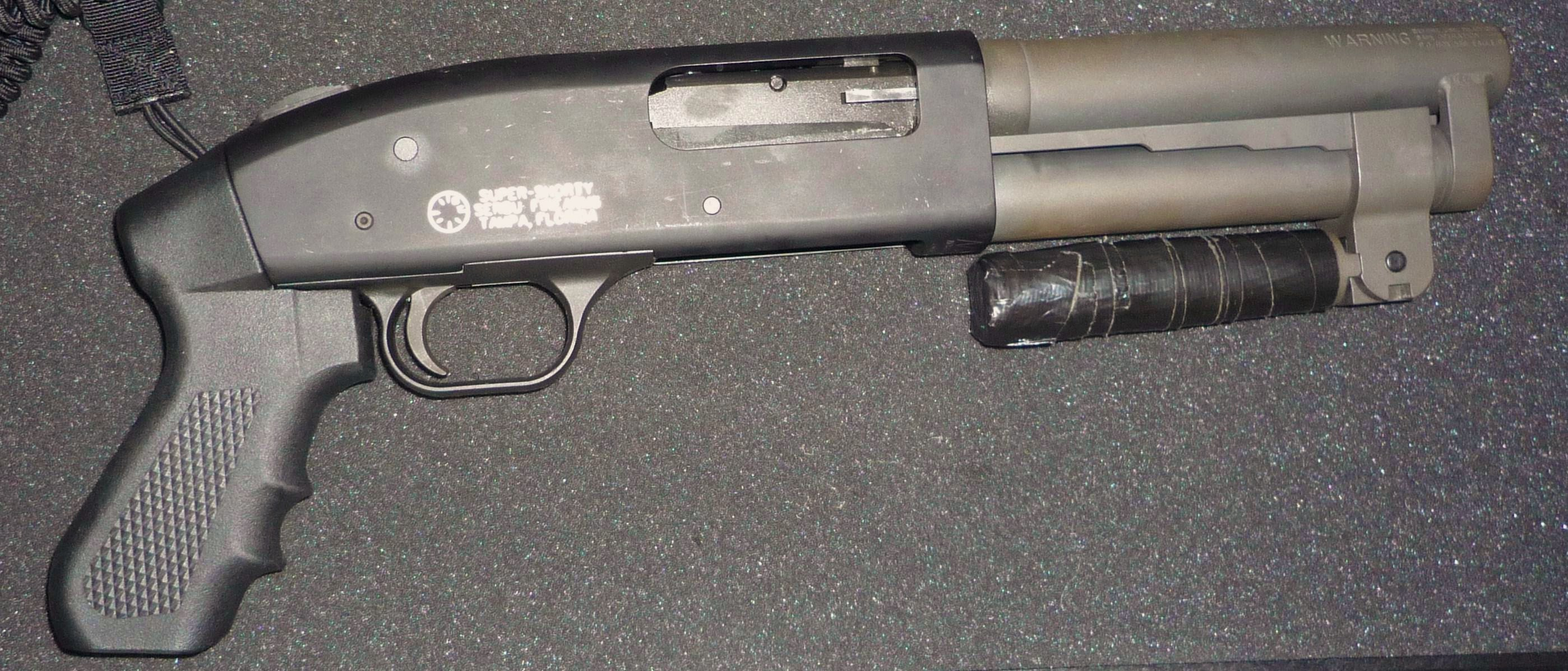
The Serbu Super-Shorty pump-action shotgun, manufactured without a buttstock, is an AOW smooth-bore handgun, not an SBS.

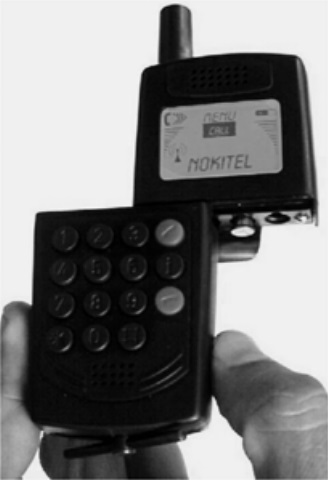
A disguised firearm such as this cell phone gun is an AOW.

"Any other weapon" is a "catch-all" category. An AOW is defined as "any weapon or device capable of being concealed on the person from which a shot can be discharged through the energy of an explosive," other than a handgun with a rifled barrel. This umbrella definition includes many improvised firearms ("zip guns") and disguised firearms. Examples include wallet guns, cane guns, knife guns and pen guns. Since January 1, 2026, an AOW can be transferred to a non-prohibited person with a $0 tax stamp. Before that the tax was $5 for an AOW and $200 for a short-barreled rifle and a short-barreled shotgun. The $200 tax still applies to machine guns.

AOW is a complex and often misunderstood category of NFA firearms. Less obvious examples of AOW devices include:

Short-barreled shotguns manufactured without a shoulder stock (less than 26" overall length)
They are smooth-bore handguns which fire shot shells, not shotguns, which must be designed to be fired from the shoulder.
Pistols with a second vertical grip
Many pistols feature a rail below the barrel, commonly used to mount a laser or flashlight. Attaching a vertical grip to this rail constitutes the manufacturing of an AOW firearm, as it is "no longer designed to be held and fired by the use of a single hand." It is therefore illegal to place an aftermarket vertical foregrip on any pistol without first registering it as an AOW (the making tax has been $0 since January 1, 2026). Failure to do so is a felony punishable by up to 10 years in prison. However, if the receiver was originally manufactured to accept either a long or short barrel and a removable buttstock and fore grip and it can be assembled either as a rifle or a pistol, according to ATF rule 2011-2014 it is not considered an NFA weapon as long as it is only assembled as a pistol without a buttstock or as a rifle with a barrel at least 16 inches long. A vertical foregrip MAY be added to a pistol as long as the Overall Length (OAL) is greater than 26", regardless of barrel length, and providing the weapon remains unconcealed. An AR-15 pistol with an overall length of 26" or longer may have a vertical foregrip installed, as long as no buttstock is installed in conjunction with a shorter than 16" barrel. The Sig Sauer Pistol Braces (SBS and SBX) are commonly found on these AR-15 style pistols with vertical foregrips since they are not considered buttstocks. The ATF does not consider a weapon in this configuration to be an AOW, but instead classifies it as a 'Firearm' which does not require any tax stamp or additional registration.
Firearms having combination rifle and shotgun barrels, more than 12 inches but less than 18 inches long from which only a single discharge can be made from either barrel without manual reloading
These are designed to be fired from the shoulder. An example is the Marble Game Getter an early 20th-century sporting gun sold before the NFA.
Spud guns
These may potentially be classified as AOWs because they have a large bore and an unrifled barrel. One of the frequently asked questions on the BATF website FAQs is: "How do I obtain a classification from ATF for my "potato gun?" It is not known at present if the BATF has actually classified any potato gun as an AOW. Such a classification would require the manufacturer to either register it (the making tax has been $0 since January 1, 2026), surrender the weapon to the BATF, or destroy it. However, the vast majority of potato cannons, despite having a barrel diameter of much more than ½ inches, are built as muzzle-loading guns. Since these are not considered firearms (and thus completely unregulated) under US laws, building, owning, or selling potato cannons of traditional design is very unlikely to result in legal repercussions. However, any explosive rounds designed for these guns would be classified as destructive devices.

=== Antique firearm ===
An antique firearm is excluded from NFA regulation if it is "not likely to be used as a weapon" and is not a machine gun or destructive device. It must have been manufactured before 1899:

18 USC 921 (a)(16). (A) any firearm (including any firearm with a matchlock, flintlock, percussion cap, or similar type of ignition system) manufactured in or before 1898; and (B) any replica of any firearm described in subparagraph (A) if such replica -- (i) is not designed or redesigned for using rimfire or conventional centerfire fixed ammunition, or (ii) uses rimfire or conventional centerfire fixed ammunition which is no longer manufactured in the United States and which is not readily available in the ordinary channels of commercial trade.

Note that a firearm manufactured before 1899 is an antique by nature of production date. A replica is of the same status provided it is either a muzzle loader, uses non-fixed ammunition (such as pinfire cartridges), or custom ammunition not commercially produced (such as conversion cartridges). Note that ATF has not defined "commercial production" for quantities of ammunition to qualify as "readily available".

== Restrictions ==
The ownership of Title II weapons is not illegal, but is heavily regulated at both the State and Federal level. Numerous federal restrictions are imposed on the ownership of NFA firearms, including an extensive background check initiated by the applicant's local police department or Sheriff's office. In most states, certification of the local background check is discretionary ("May-Certify"), meaning the law enforcement agency charged with initiating the background check may deny certification of the background check either arbitrarily or for reasons unrelated to the information obtained from the background check, or refuse to accept applications to start the background check process. Some states have passed "Shall-Certify" legislation requiring local law enforcement agencies to process and certify applications for those who pass the initial background check. A few states completely outlaw private citizens from obtaining NFA Title II weapons ("No-Certify").

Federal law imposes a $200 tax on the manufacture or transfer of a machine gun or destructive device. The tax is $0 for all other NFA firearms. Federal law also requires registration under the NFA. Generally, for the manufacture of NFA items, ATF Form 5320-1 must be submitted to the ATF. For the transfer of a NFA item from a person or entity lawfully entitled to transfer it (Class 3 dealer) to oneself, or an entity (Gun Trust or LLC), the ATF Form 5320-4 must be submitted to the ATF. Any violation of the NFA is a felony punishable by a fine of up to $250,000 and up to 10 years in prison, and any firearm involved is forfeit.

Of NFA firearms (silencers, machine guns, short barrel rifles, short barrel shotguns, any other weapon (AOW) and destructive devices) machineguns are the most restricted. Since 19 May 1986, no new machineguns can be registered for private ownership.

Effective January 1, 2026, short barrel rifles (SBR), short barrel shotguns (SBS), any other weapons (AOW) and suppressors (silencers) transfer with a $0 transfer tax. Essentially a zero-dollar tax stamp that was previously $200.00 or $5.00 depending on the classification of the weapon. Provisions in President Donald Trump’s “One Big Beautiful Bill" initially removed SBRs, SBSs, AOWs, and suppressors from the restriction of the National Firearms Act in their entirety but that was removed by the Senate Parliamentarian upon arrival in the senate. When the bill was received back in the House of Representatives, Senate Republicans had removed the transfer tax stamp cost from selected NFA items, still requiring the additional NFA transfer requirements but without the additional cost of the stamp. In late 2025, 35+ congressional members, including Andrew Clyde of Georgia, sent a letter to Attorney General Pam Bondi expressing their desire to remove SBRs, SBSs, AOWs, and Suppressors from NFA restrictions entirely, as was the original intent of the “One Big Beautiful Bill”.

=== State laws on NFA firearms ===
A few states, such as New York, Delaware, and California, prohibit ownership of all or certain types of Title II weapons and devices. Most states allow legal ownership if the owner has complied with the federal registration and taxation requirements. A few states only allow possession of NFA firearms on the ATF Curios and Relics List, again only if the owner has complied with all federal requirements.

== See also ==
- Destructive device
- Gun law in the United States
- Improvised firearm
- National Firearms Act
- Gun Control Act of 1968
