= Dolon =

Dolon may refer to:

- Dolon (mythology), character in Greek mythology who spied for Troy during the Trojan War
- Dolon (Δόλων), a women's cult-association at Cyzicus worshiping the goddess Artemis
- Dolon (air base), air base in Semipalatinsk, Kazakhstan
- Dolon, Issyk Kul, village in the Issyk Kul Province of Kyrgyzstan
- Dolon Pass, mountain pass in Kyrgyzstan
- Dolon Nor, town in Duolun County, Inner Mongolia, China
- Duolun County, or Dolon, in Inner Mongolia, China
- 7815 Dolon, Jupiter Trojan
- Dolon, an Ancient Roman type of swordstick
