= Mughal weapons =

Weaponry of the Mughal Empire

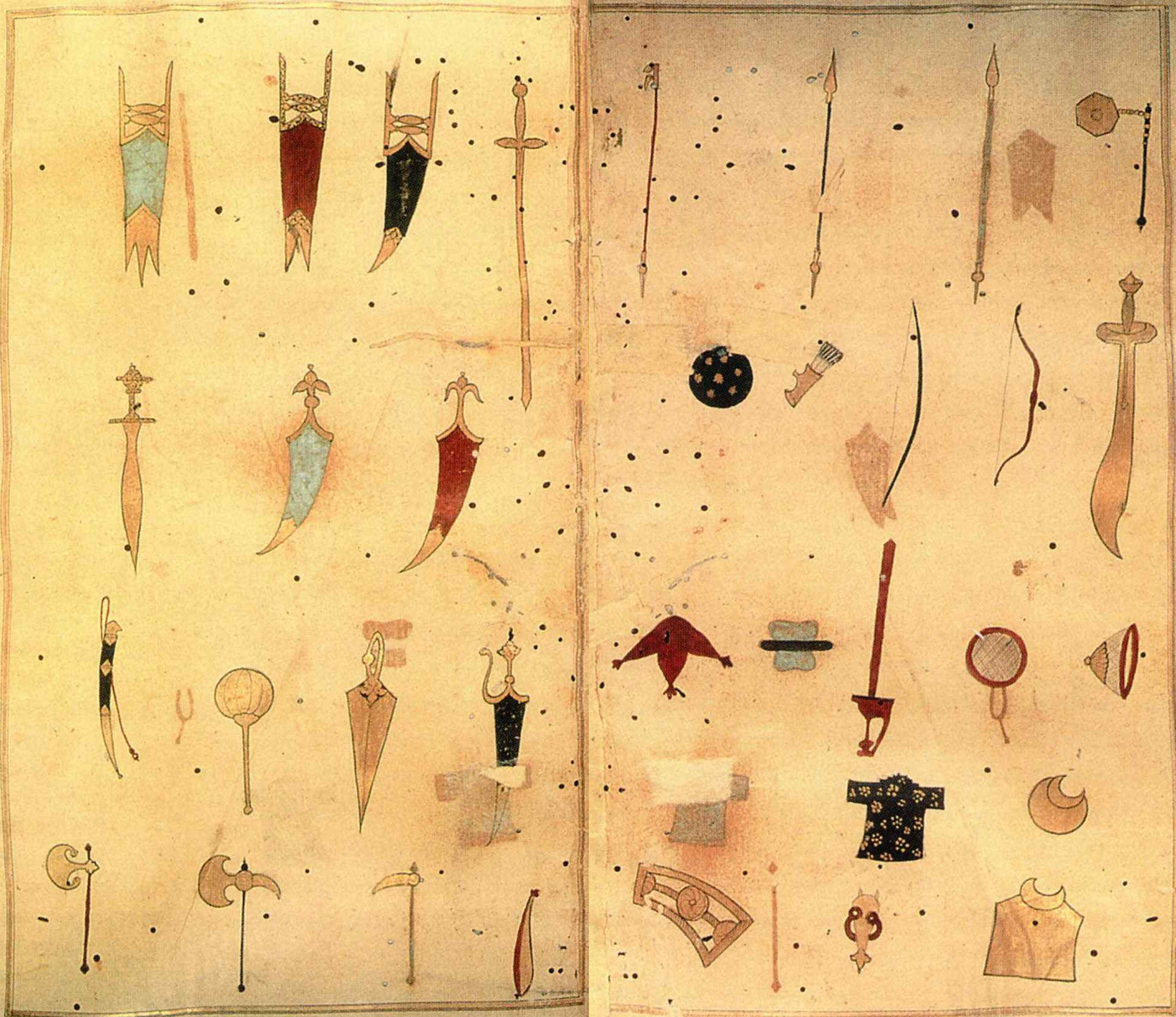
Ain-i Akbari weaponry

Mughal weapons significantly evolved during the ruling periods of its various rulers. During its conquests throughout the centuries, the military of the Mughal Empire used a variety of weapons including swords, bows and arrows, horses, camels, elephants, some of the world's largest cannons, muskets and flintlock blunderbusses.

== Arms ==
Under the Mughals, the most important centers of production of military equipment were Delhi and Lahore.

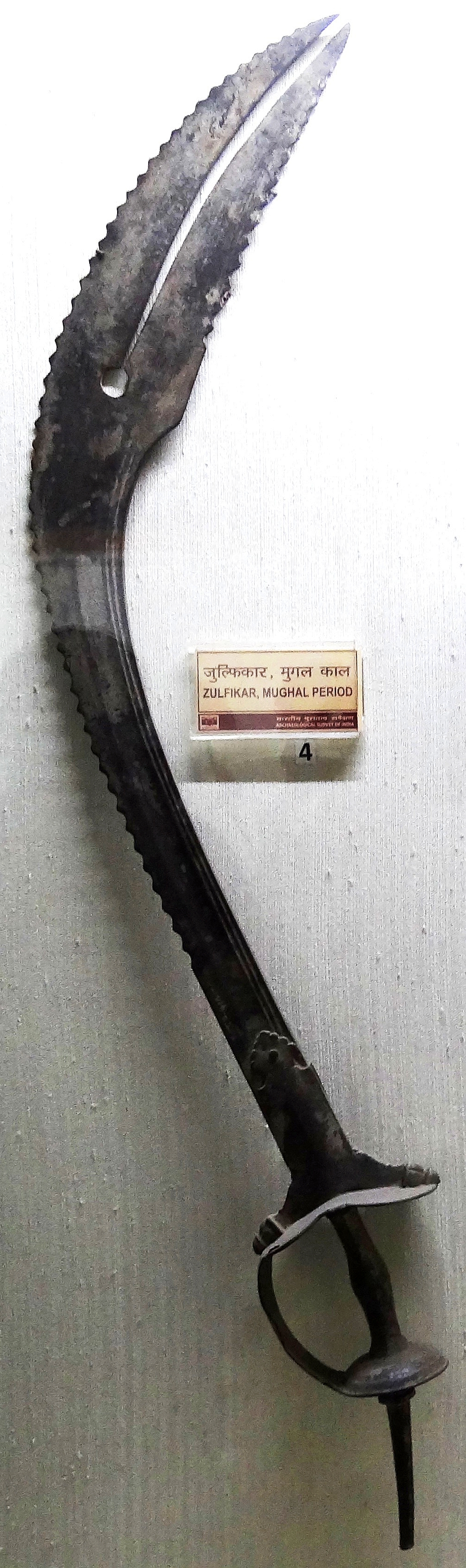
Zulfikar, a Mughal sword

Most cavalrymen mainly depended upon the short arms (kotah-yaraq) for close quarter combat. They are classified into five categories: swords and shields, maces, battle-axes, spears and daggers. Weapons used for long range attacks were the bow and arrow (Kaman & Tir), the matchlock (Banduq or Tufanq) and the pistols. Rockets were also used by the artillerymen (Topkanah).

Each man had to be supplied with his own weaponry, usually bringing spears, axes or single-edged swords. The great number of weapons that a man carried is graphically described by Fitzclarence, about an officer of his guards. He was a petty officer of the Nizam's service, who commended his escort:

"Two very handsome horses with superb caparisons belong to this jamadar, who is himself dressed in a vest of green English broad cloth laced with gold, and very rich embroidered belts. A shield of buffalo hide with gilt bosses is hung over his back. His arms are two swords and a dagger, a brace of English pistols (flintlocks), and he has his matchlock carried before him by a servant."

=== Swords ===
Swordbelts were generally broad and handsomely embroidered. On horseback they were worn on a belt hanging over the shoulder. Otherwise a man carried his sword by three straps hanging from a waist-belt.

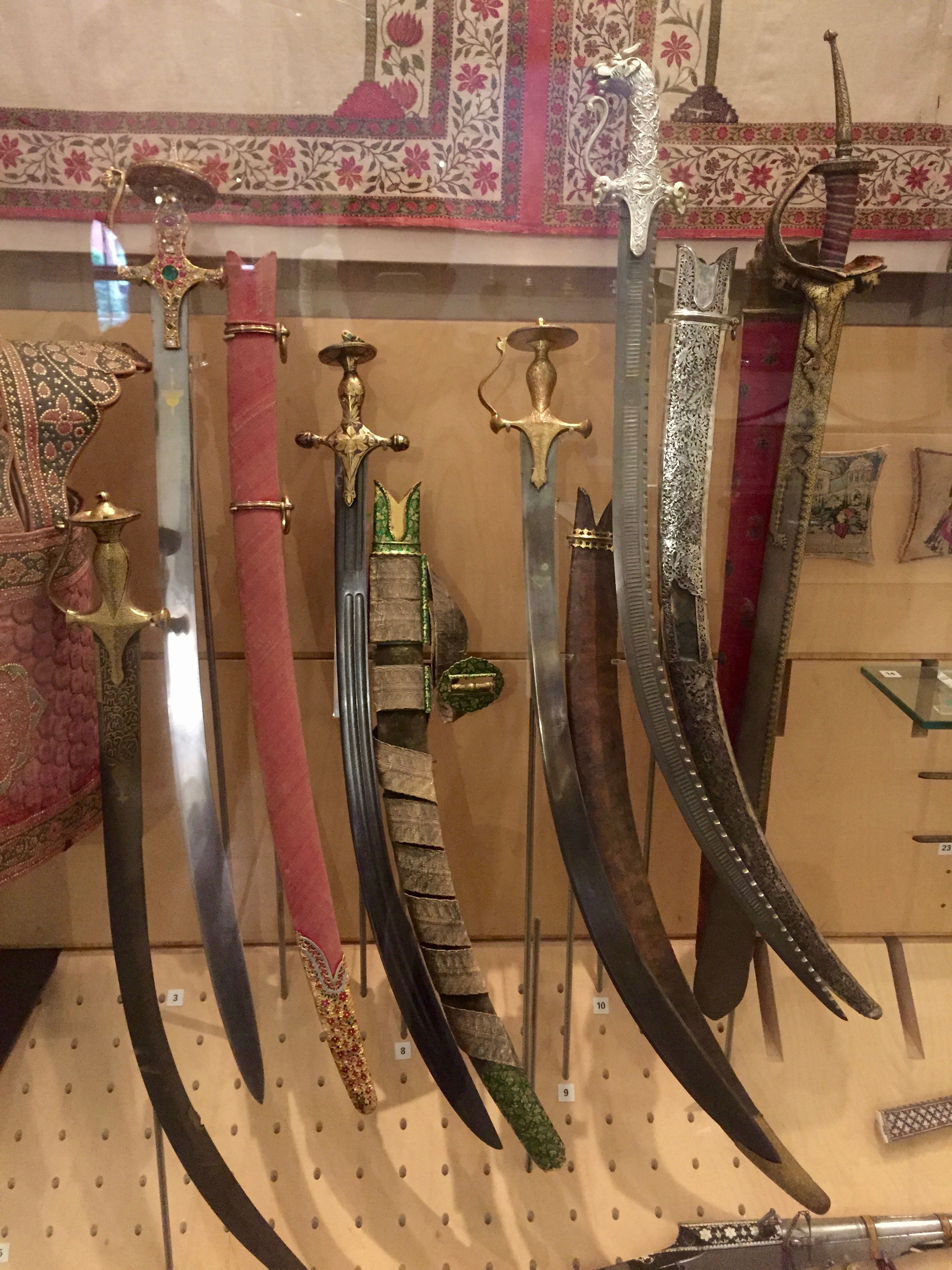
Prince Dara Shikoh's sword and scabbard (number 8), at the V&A Museum in London.

Types of blades:

- Talwar was the principle blade of the Mughal infantry. By the 18th century it would later be carried by Sepoy.
- Shamsher - A curved weapon similar to a scimitar. Purely a cutting weapon due to its shape and the small size of the grip.
- Dhup - A straight sword. It was adopted from the Dakhin, this straight sword had a broad blade four feet long and a cross hilt. Considered an emblem of sovereignty and high dignity, it was displayed on state occasions carried in a velvet wrapping by a man who held it upright before his master. It also lay on the great man's pillow when he was seated at a darbar, a public transaction of business. This kind of sword was conferred as a distinction on successful soldiers, great nobles, and court favourites. It was made of steel.
- Khanda - A straight sword. It was apparently identical to the dhup.
- Sirohi sword - A scimitar. This sword had a slightly curved blade, shaped like a Damascus blade, slightly lighter and narrower than the ordinary talwar. They were made in Sirohi with Damascus steel.
- Pata - A narrow-bladed, straight rapier with a gauntlet hilt. Often used in performances.
- Gupti - A straight sword concealed in the sheath of a walking stick . The head or handle and a fakir's crutch was closely allied in appearance with the crutch of dagger length and the weapon appearing like a short crooked staff about three feet long. It was used by persons of rank as an emblem of humility.
- Zulfikar - It was a very vital sword in Mughal era, specially used by Mughal emperors (After emperor Aurangzeb) and generals in the battlefield to break the opponent fighter's sword or short dagger by its own divided blade during fighting and that made killing enemy easier on that weaponless situation. This sword was the personal sword of Mughal emperor Aurangzeb which was in service for first 10 years of his reign. But it was discontinued around 1670 as part of the emperor's austerity measures.

=== Shields ===
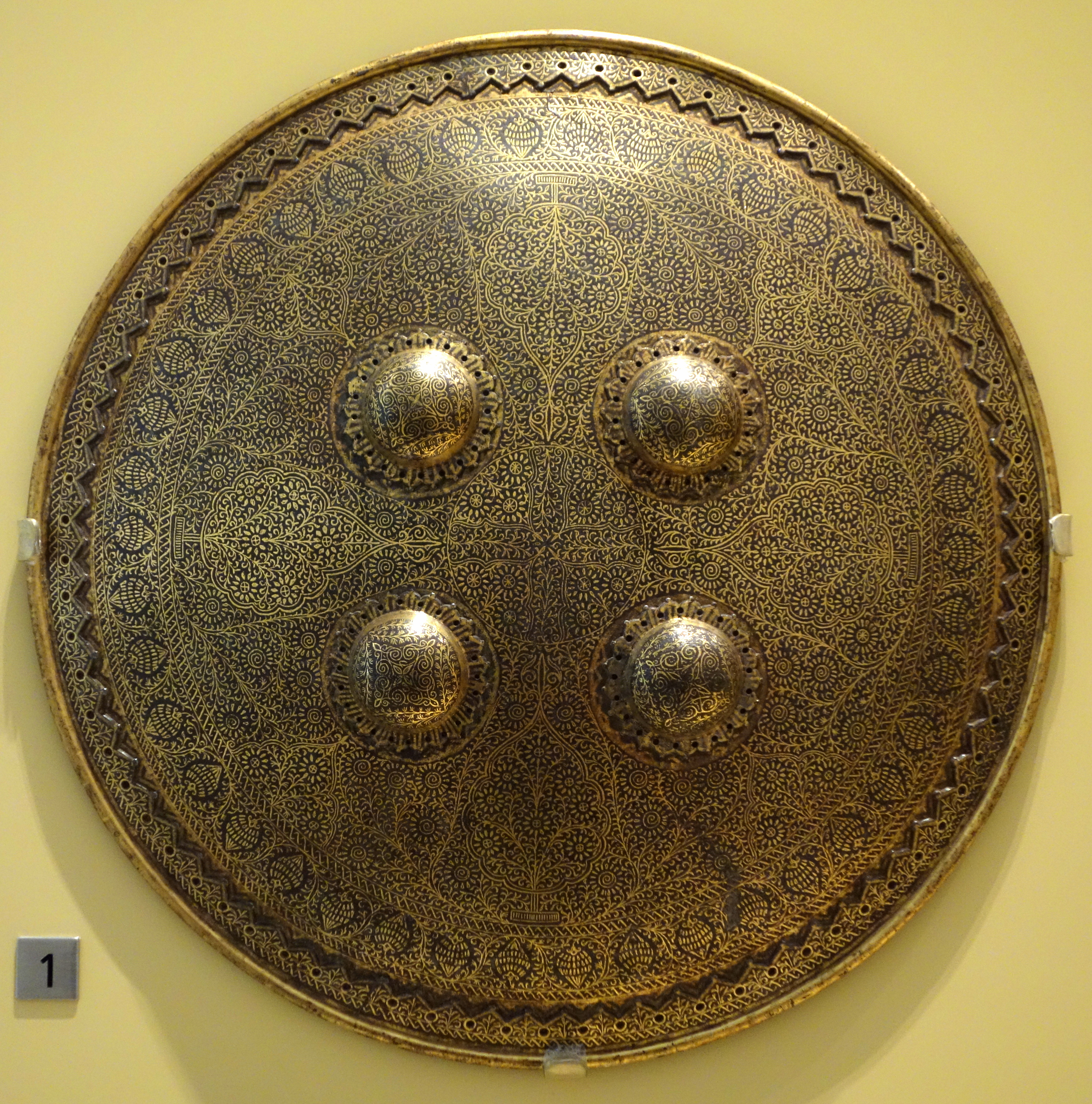
Dhal (shield), North India, Mughal period, 17th century, steel, gold, silk, leather - Royal Ontario Museum - DSC04543

A shield always accompanied a sword as part of the swordsman's equipment. Carried on the left arm, or when out of use, slung over the shoulder, shields were made of steel or hide and were generally from 430 to 610 millimetres (17 to 24 inches) in diameter. If made of steel they were often highly ornamented with patterns in gold damascening while hide shields bore silver or gold bosses, crescents, or stars. Some types of shields were made of sambar deer, buffalo, nilgau, elephant, or rhinoceros hide, the last being the most highly prized. Brahman soldiers wore shields made up of forty or fifty folds of silk painted with colors.

Types of shields

- Chirwah and Tilwah— These shields were carried by the shamsherbaz, or gladiators, groups of whom always surrounded the Mughal emperor Akbar (1542–1605) on the march.
- Fencing Shields— Small circular shields of cane or bamboo sometimes called dal (pronounced dhaal) because their shape resembled a lentil. The quaint maru or singauta, was made from a pair of antelope horns tipped with steel and united at the butt-ends. Sainti were classed as parrying shields.

=== Ceremonial Mace ===
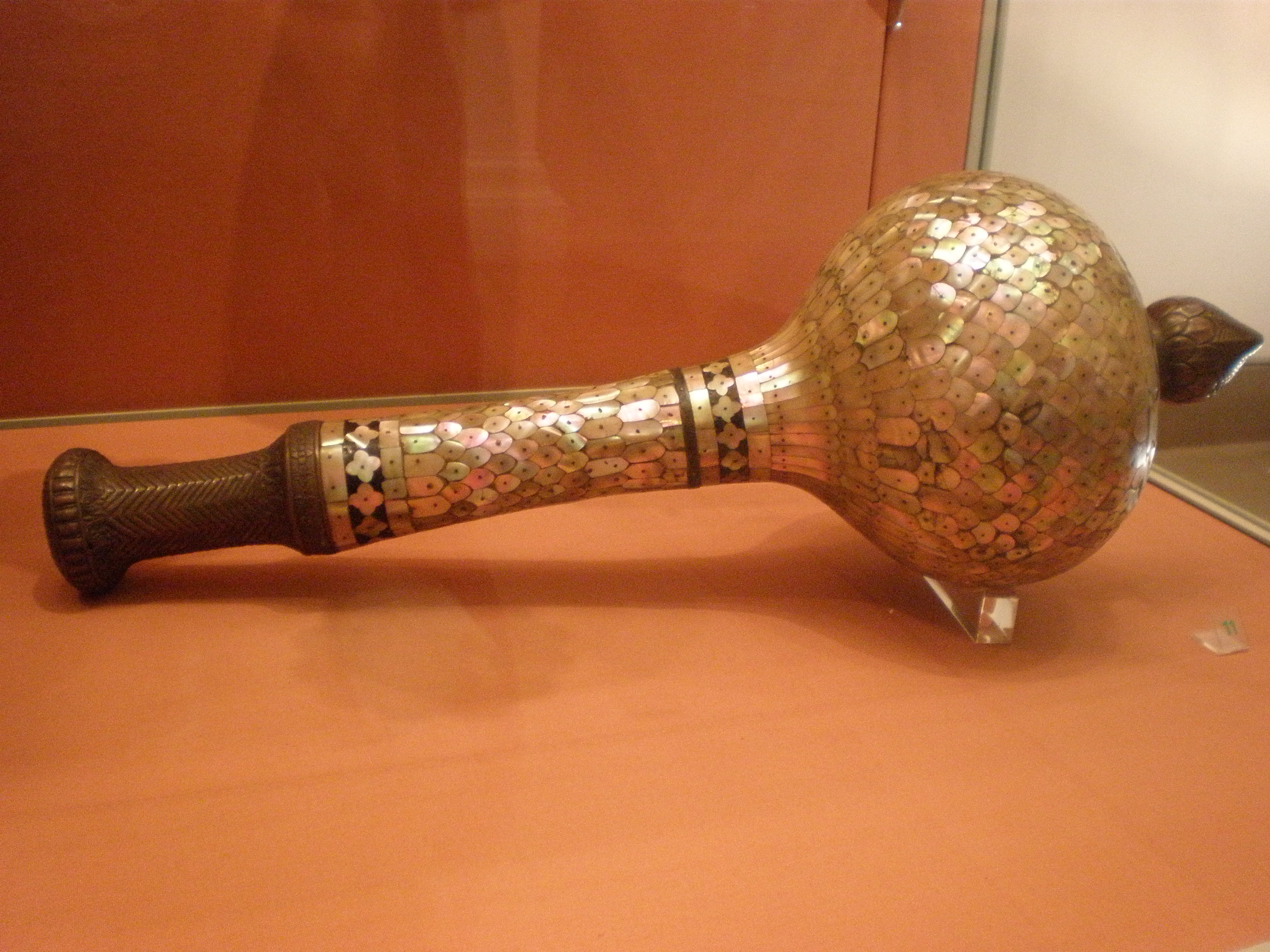
Ceremonial Mace chob

- The mace (gurj), a short-handled club with three large round balls at the end, usually formed part of the weaponry of any Mughul warrior of considerable rank.
- Another variety, the shashbur, or "lung-tearer", had a single round-shaped head while similar weapons included the dhara, gargaj and khandli phansi.
- The 610 millimetres (2 ft) long dhara had a six-bladed head and octagonal steel shaft and came from Kolhapur.
- The garguz had eight-bladed heads and basket hilts or was seven-bladed with a basket hilt. Its length varied from 61 to 53 millimetres (2.4 to 2.10 in).
- The khundli phansi was 25 millimetres (1 in) long and had a head of open scroll work.
- The flail was a weapon that may be classed as a mace, along with the pusht-khar, or "back-scratcher", made of steel in the shape of a hand.
- The khar-i-mahi, or "fish backbone", had steel spikes projecting from each side of a straight head.
- The weapon called the gujbag was the common elephant goad or ankus.

=== Battle-axe ===
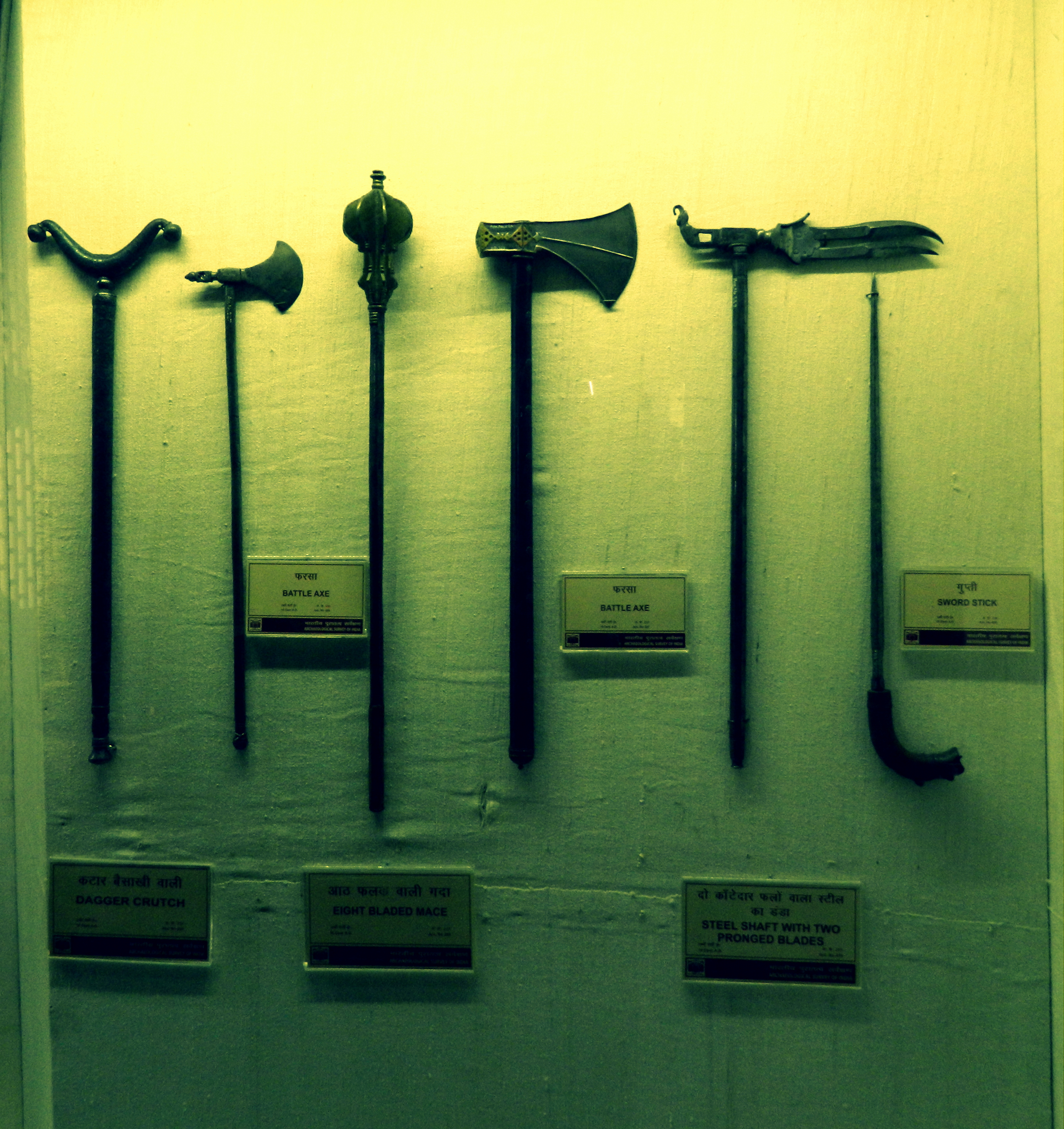
1. Dagger Crutch (fakir's crutch, mendicant's crutch), 2. Tabar (war axe), 3. Eight Bladed flanged mace, 4. Tabar (war axe) and 5. Zaghnal (battle axe) 6.Sword Stick (at the time of Mughals)

- If the head was pointed and had two cutting edges, the axe was called a zaghnol, or "crow's beak".
- A double headed axe with a broad blade on one side of the handle and a pointed one on the other was styled a tabar zaghnol.
- An axe with a longer handle, called tarangalah, was also used. The shafts of the tabar ranged from 430 to 580 millimetres (17 to 23 in) in length with a head from 130 to 150 millimetres (5 to 6 in) one way and 76 to 127 millimetres (3 to 5 in) the other. Some heads were crescent shaped with one of the shafts hollow for storage of a dagger.
- A 'Basolah' looked like a chisel while highly ornamented silver axes were carried by attendants for display in the audience hall.

=== Spears ===
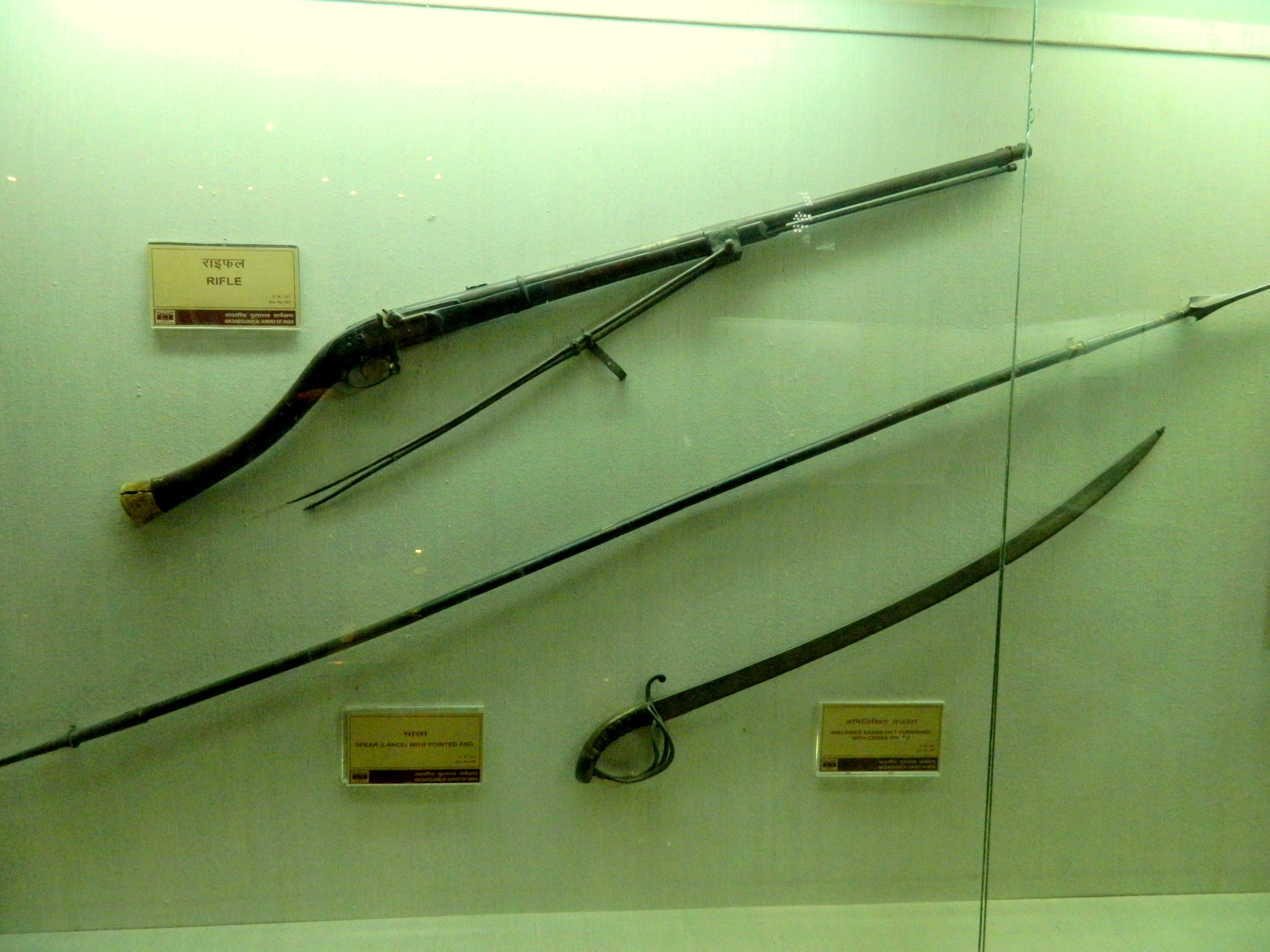
Rifle, Spear and Inscribed Sabre-Hilt at the time of Mughals

There were several varieties of this class of weapon. Cavalry troops generally used a lance with other types of spears used by foot soldiers and guards surrounding the emperor's audience hall. There is also some evidence, particularly among the Marathas, for the use of a javelin or short spear, which was thrown.

- Nezah - A cavalry lance with a small steel head and a long bamboo shaft carried by nezah-bazan (lance-wielders). In normal use, a man on horseback held his spear above his head at the full length of his arm. Made up of Bamboo and steel
- Barchhah - a Mughal weapon also used by the Marathas. With a head and shaft made wholly of iron or steel, use of this heavy spear was confined to infantry as it would prove too heavy for men on horseback.
- Sang - Made up entirely of iron, this spear was much shorter than the barchhah although some exist that are 2.17 metres (7.11 ft) long, of which the head accounting for 0.79 metres (2.6 ft). The weapon possessed long, slender, three or four-sided heads, steel shafts, and had a grip covered with velvet.
- Sainthi - The shaft was shorter than that of the sang.
- Selarah - A spear with a head and shaft longer than those of the sainthi but not so long as those of the sang.
- Ballam - A spear, pike, or lance with barbed heads and wooden shafts and a total length of 1.56 metres (5.11 ft), of which the blade took up 460 millimetres (18 in). The Ballam was a short spear with a broad head used by infantry. || Infantry
- Pandi-ballam - A hog-spear with an iron leaf-shaped blade at the end of a bamboo shaft with a total length of 2.5 metres (8.3 ft), of which the blade accounted for 0.70 metres (2.3 ft).
- Panjmukh - Five-headed spear used by the people of Gujarat.
- Lange - A Mughal lance with a four-cornered iron head and a hollow shaft.
- Garhiya - May be pike, javelin or spear
- Alam - A spear (properly a standard or banner)
- Kont - One type of spear
- Gandasa - A kind of bill-hook or pole-axe with a steel chopper attached to a long pole. Used by the chaukidar or village watchmen

=== Daggers and knives ===
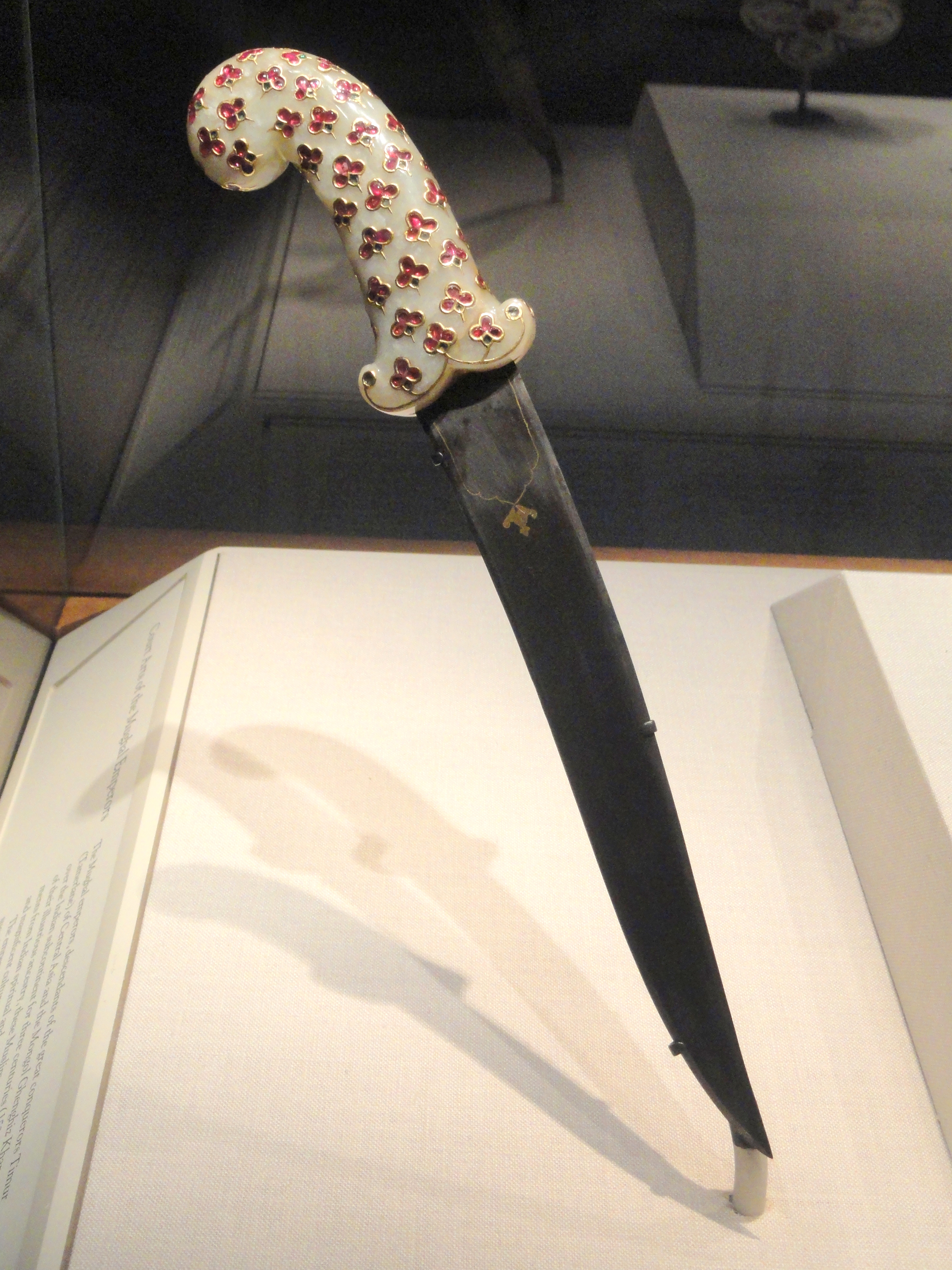
Dagger, Mughal dynasty, late 17th century, watered steel blade, hilt of nephrite inlaid with gold, rubies, and emeralds - Freer Gallery of Art - DSC05186

These were of various shapes and kinds, each with a separate name (a dagger would also indicate the ethnicity of the warrior).

- Katara or Katari - A lightweight push dagger similar to a poignard and peculiar to India. Made with a hilt whose two branches extended along the arm so as to protect the hand and part of the arm, this weapon had a thick blade with two cutting edges having a breadth of 76 millimetres (3 inches) at the hilt and a solid point 25 millimetres (1 inch) wide. The blade could not be bent and was so stiff that nothing but a cuirass could stop it. A katara's total length extended to 560 millimetres (22 in), one half of this being the blade. The hilt had a cross-bar at right angles to the blade, by which the weapon was grasped such that it could only be used for a forward thrust. Some were slightly curved whilst others resembled a fork or were two-bladed. Blades were of various patterns with a length that varied from 230 to 440 millimetres (9 to 17.5 in).
- Jamadhar - This had the same handle as a katara but with a broad and straight blade, while the katara blade could be either straight or curved. The jamadhar katari - Had a straight blade and a handle held in the same way as a table-knife or sword.
- Khanjar - A poignard type dagger with a hilt like a sword of which most had doubly curved blades and were about 300 millimetres (12 in) long. The weapon originated among the Turks, who carried it upright and on the right side, but it was occasionally worn by both Persians and Indians, the latter wearing it inclined on the left side. They were four types: jamhak, jhambwah, bank, and narsingh moth. All four of these weapons appear to be of the same class as the khanjar, although they varied slightly in form. Mainly used by Turks, occasionally by both Persians and Indians
- Bichuwa and Khapwah. Literally "scorpion", this type of knife had a wavy blade while the khapwah was also a type of dagger. It was almost identical with the jambwahand used by mainly Marathas.
- Peshkaj - A pointed Persian dagger generally with a thick straight back to the blade and a straight handle without a guard, though at times the blade was curved, or even double-curved. Some of the hilts had guards.
- Karud is Introduced by Afghans, this resembled a butcher's knife and was kept in a sheath. Karuds had a total length of 0.79 metres (2.6 ft) with a blade 0.61 metres (2 ft). The gupti-karud was inserted into a stick while the qamchi-karud was a whip-shaped knife. The chaqu was a clasp-knife. It is a combat knife used by Panjabis.
- Sailabah-i-Qalmaqi - The name for a knife used by men from Kashghar. As long as a sword and with a handle made of fish-bone called sher-mahi (lion-fish), it was worn slung from an ashob or shoulder belt.This Combat Knife is Used by the men from Kashghar.

=== Missiles ===
Bows and arrows, matchlocks, pistols and cannons made up the four categories of missile weapons. Cavalry were mainly equipped with the bow with Mughal horsemen noted for their archery. Legend told that the bow and arrow were brought down straight from Heaven and given to Adam by the archangel Gabriel. Personal weapons were ranked in the following order: the dagger, the sword, the spear and the soldier's with the top weapon the bow and arrow.

Despite the spread of firearms, use of the bow persisted throughout the 18th century due to its superior build quality and ease of handling. Bows were widely used by the rebels during the Indian rebellion of 1857.

The matchlock, a cumbrous and no doubt ineffective weapon, was left mainly to the infantry while pistols seem to have been rare.

Mughal field artillery, although expensive, proved an effective tool against hostile war elephants and its use led to several decisive victories. After Babur's artillery defeated the armies of Ibrahim Lodi in the 16th century, subsequent Mughal emperors considered field artillery the most important and prestigious type of weapon.

==== Rocket ====
Hyder Ali and Tipu Sultan are given credit for the creation of the rocket. However it is very possible that the idea originated in Mughal era India.

==== Bows ====
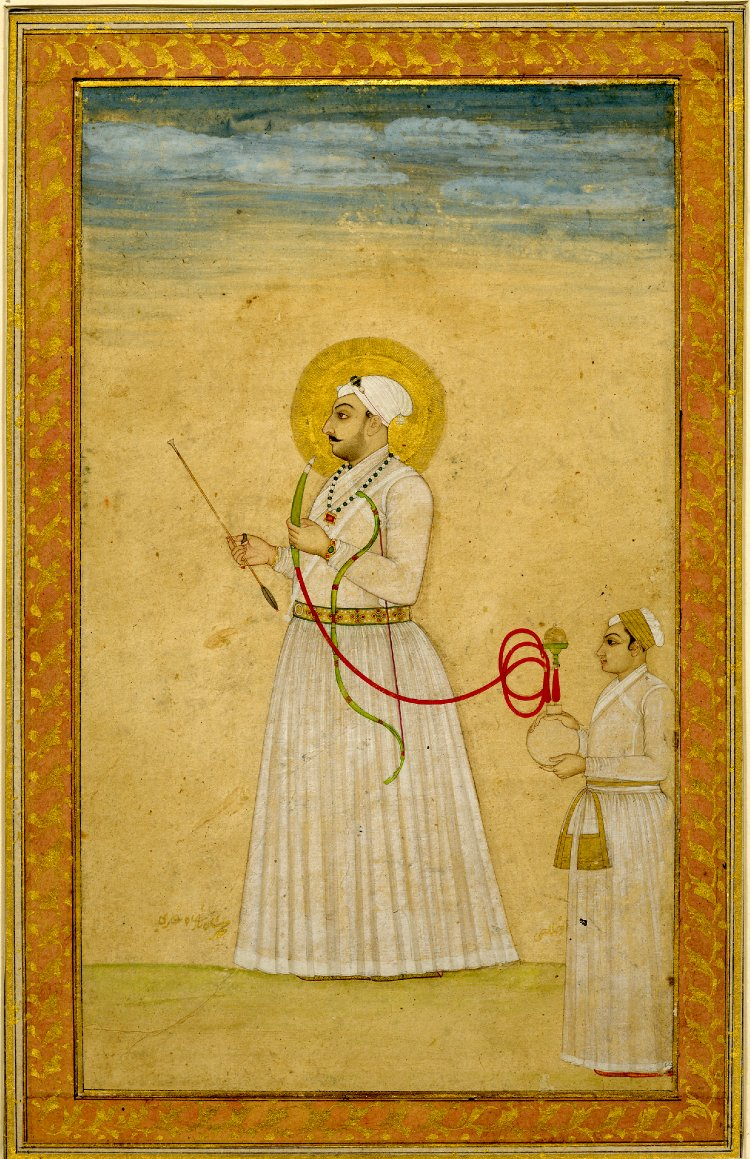
A standing portrait of Muhammad Shah holding a bow and arrow, as well as a huqqa pipe

Considered especially expert in the use of their weapons, Mughal horsemen armed with bows could shoot three times faster than musketeers.

The standard Mughal kaman (bow) was about 1.2 metres (4 feet) long and generally shaped in a double curve with a grip covered in velvet. Made of horn, wood, bamboo, ivory, and sometimes of steel, two of these steel bows.

Several strings of thick catgut lined the Mughal bow on its concave side (convex when strung) to give it elasticity and force. The belly was made of finely polished buffalo or wild goats' horn in jet black. Glued to this was a thin slip of hard, tough wood. The ends were fashioned to represent snakes' heads with the horn left plain, while the wooden back was decorated with rich intermingled arabesques of gilded birds, flowers or fruit. Indian bows carried by travellers also served for show or amusement. These types were made of buffalo horn in two identically curved pieces curved, each with a wooden tip for receipt of the string. Their other ends were brought together and fastened to a strong piece of wood that served as a centre and was gripped in the left hand. After construction, they were covered with a size made of animal fibres then wrapped in a thin layer of fine tow before the application of a final coat of paint and varnish.

Bow strings were sometimes made of strong threads of white silk laid together to form a cylinder about 1.25 centimetres (0.49 in) in diameter. Whipping of the same material was then bound firmly round for a length of three or four inches at the centre, and to this middle piece large loops of scarlet or other coloured material attached by a complicated knot. These gaudy loops then formed a striking contrast to the white silk.

A Bow string holder consists of a broad ring made of precious stone, crystal, jade, ivory, horn, fishbone, gold or iron in accordance with an individual's rank.

Special bows

- Charkh - A crossbow used by Afghan men from Charkh
- Takhsh kaman - A type of small bow.
- Kaman-i-gurohah - A pellet-bow, identical to the modern gulel, used by boys to scare birds away from ripening crops.
- Gobhan are Slings such as these were brought by the villagers who assembled in 1710 to aid in the defence of Jalalabad town against the Sikhs led by Banda Singh Bahadur.
- Kamthah - The long bow of the Bhils of Central India. This group held the bow with their feet, drawing the string (chillah) with the hands and able to shoot with enough power for their arrow to penetrate elephant's hide. The principal weapon of the Bhils was the kampti or bamboo bow, with a string made of a thin strip from the elastic bark of the bamboo. Bhils carried sixty barbed arrows each a yard long in their quiver, those intended for striking fish having heads which came off the shaft on striking the fish. A long line connected the head and the shaft, so that the shaft remained on the water's surface as a float.
- Nawak - A pipe through which an arrow was shot, the nawak was used for shooting birds. This was either a cross-bow, or formed in some way as part of an ordinary bow. It was not a blow-pipe like those used by the Malays for their poisoned arrows. Specimens of the pipe are 2.0 to 2.3 metres (6.6 to 7.6 ft) long and use foot-long arrows.
- Tufak-i-dahan - A blow-pipe used as a tube for shooting clay balls by force of the breath.

Arrows were of two types: those in common use relied on reeds for their fabrication and used against tigers had wooden shafts. Reed-based arrows used resin to attach the head while those of wood had a hole bored into their shaft into which a red-hot head was forced. Some arrows in the India Museum were 0.73 metres (2.4 ft) long; one example, obtained at Lucknow in 1857, extended to 1.8 metres (6 feet) and would have required the use of a larger than average bow. Feathers used for arrows were frequently mixed black and white (ablaq) while the arrowhead was ordinarily of steel although the Bhils used bone.

==== Matchlock ====
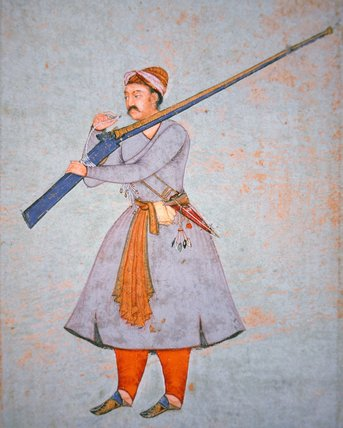
Officer of the Mughal Army with large Matchlock

Known as the tufang, Mughal emperor Akbar introduced many improvements in the manufacture of the matchlock, like the toradar.

The relatively small bore and thick barrel often made of wootz steel allowed Indian firearms to be used with proportionate larger powder charge, likely providing greater range and precision than European barrels at the time. Jean-Baptiste Tavernier observed that "the barrels of their muskets are stronger than ours, and the iron is better and purer, this makes them not liable to burst". Nevertheless, during most of the Mughal period up to the middle of the 18th century, the weapon was looked on with less favour than the bow and arrow and blanches. The matchlock was left chiefly to the infantry, who occupied a much inferior position to that of the cavalry in the opinion of Mughal commanders. In the mid-19th century the Mughal cavalry continued to use matchlocks compared to the invading Iranian and Afghan armies using firelock. A critical point of failure was not adopting an efficient trigger and lock, such as the European wheellock and snaplock or the Ottoman miquelet lock. During the mid-18th century Indian rulers began using flintlock (tufang-i chaqmaq) and were increasingly being trained in European style and formation by foreign companies.

The barrels of Akbar's matchlocks were of two lengths: 1,700 millimetres (66 in) and 1,000 millimetres (41 in). They were made of rolled strips of steel with the two edges welded together. In the Deccan Plateau the introduction of the flintlock weapon, owing to intercourse with the French and English, may have been somewhat earlier.

Matchlock barrels, covered with elaborate damascened work, had their stocks adorned with embossed metal work or with various designs either in lacquer, paint, or inlays of different materials. The stocks were at times decorated with embossed and engraved mounts in gold, or the butt had an ivory or ebony cap. The barrel was generally attached to the stock by broad bands of metal or by a wire made of steel, brass, silver or gold. The broad bands were sometimes of perforated design and chased. The stocks were of two designs, the first narrow, slightly sloped, and of the same width throughout and the second sharply curved and narrow at the grip, expanding to some breadth at the butt. When not in use, matchlocks were kept and carried about in covers made of scarlet or green.

The set consisted of a powder flask, bullet pouches, priming horn (singra), matchcord, flint and steel with the whole ensemble attached to a belt often made of velvet embroidered in gold. The receptacles which contained powder and musket balls were unwieldy, and as the Mughal troops never used cartridges for their pieces, they were slow to load. Some soldiers carried more than twenty yards of match about their person, similar in appearance to a large ball of pack-thread.

Mughal infantryman armed with musket would be placed upon an elephant making them mobile, and sharpshooter in their task.

Special type of guns

- Cailletoque - A strange very long and heavy matchlock. This musket was often carried under the arm.
- Jazail or Jazair - A wall-piece or swivel gun falling somewhere between a firearm as carried by combatants and a piece of artillery and having features of both.
- Ghor-Dahan was a kind of jezail. The allusion in the name seems to be to the everted or widened mouth of the barrel.

=== Pistols ===
The pistols were called as tamanchah. The pistol was in use in India, to some extent at any rate, early in the 18th century. For instance, it was with a shot from a pistol that in October 1720 a young Sayyad, related to Husain Ali Khan, killed that nobleman's assassin. The pistol was confined to the higher ranks of the nobles, very few soldiers having European pistols and tabanchah.

- Sherbachah - This musketoon or blunderbuss seems to have been of a still later introduction than the pistol. Probably the weapon came into India with Nadir Shah's army (1738) or that of Ahmad Shah, Abdali, (1748–1761). In the last quarter of the 18th century there was a regiment of Persian horse in the Lucknow service known as the Sher-bachah.

=== Artillery ===
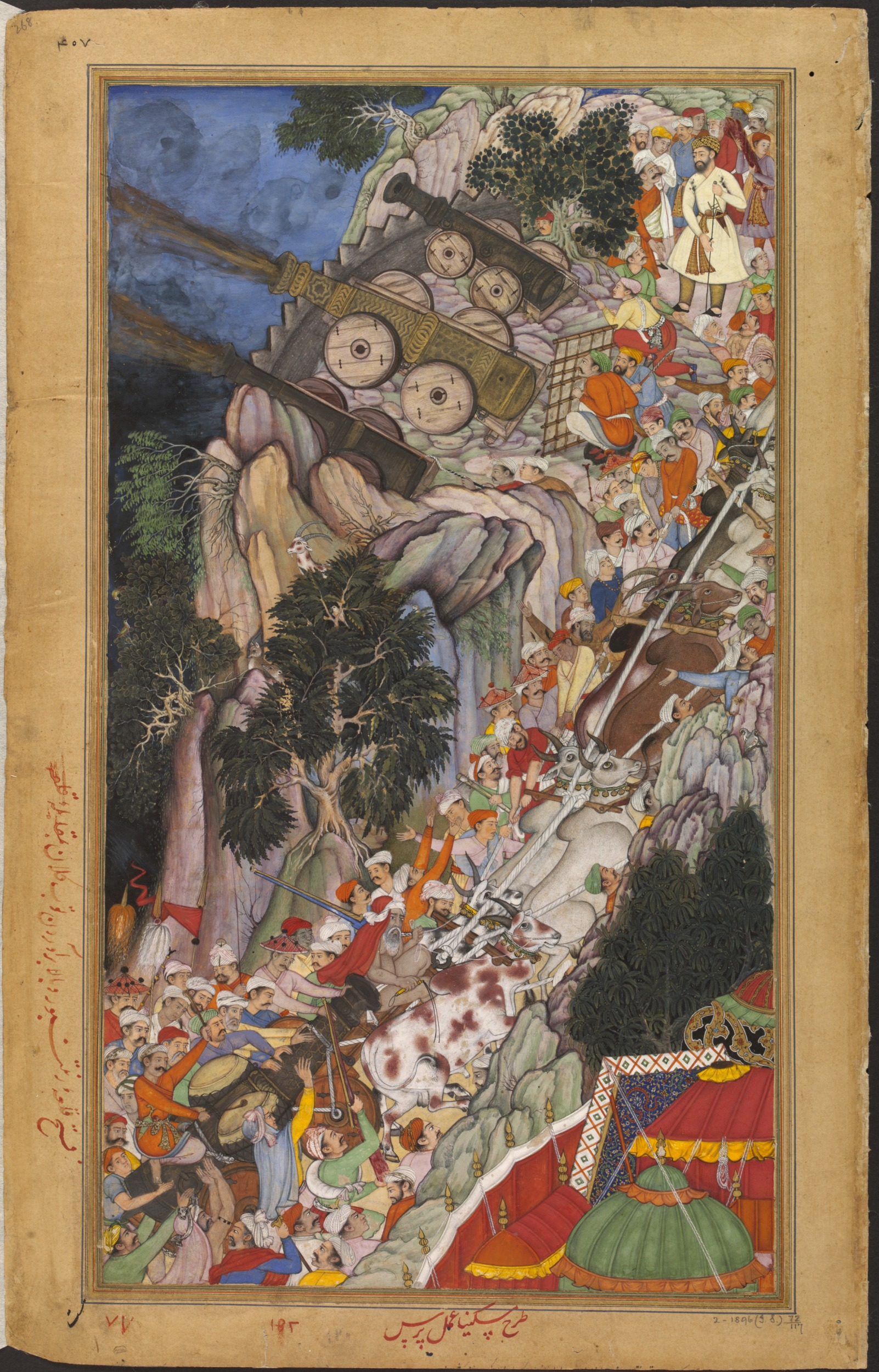
Bullocks dragging siege-guns up hill during Akbar's attack on Ranthambhor Fort

The Mughal military employed a broad array of gunpowder weapons larger than personal firearms, from rockets and mobile guns to an enormous cannon, over 4.3 metres (14 ft) long, once described as the "largest piece of ordnance in the world." This array of weapons was divided into heavy and light artillery.

Possession of mobile field artillery is seen by some historians as the central military power of the Mughal Empire and distinguished its troops from most of their enemies. A status symbol for the emperor, pieces of artillery would always accompany the Mughal ruler on his journeys through the empire. In battle the Mughals mainly used their artillery to counter hostile war elephants, which made frequent appearances in warfare on the Indian subcontinent. However, although emperor Akbar personally designed gun carriages to improve the accuracy of his cannons, Mughal artillery proved most effective in frightening the other side's elephants on the battlefield. The chaos that ensued in the opposing army's ranks allowed Mughal forces to overcome their enemy. Animal-borne swivel guns, like the zamburak became a feature of Mughal warfare with stocks often more than 2.0 metres (6.7 feet) in length, which fired a projectile 99 to 119 millimetres (3.9 to 4.7 in) in diameter

It is a widely held belief that smaller pieces of Mughal artillery were even placed upon the elephant.

The Bengali forces that fought at the Battle of Plassey owed a degree of loyalty to the "Great Moghul" they owned metallic silver lustre cannons which were placed upon specially designed bullock.

== Gallery ==
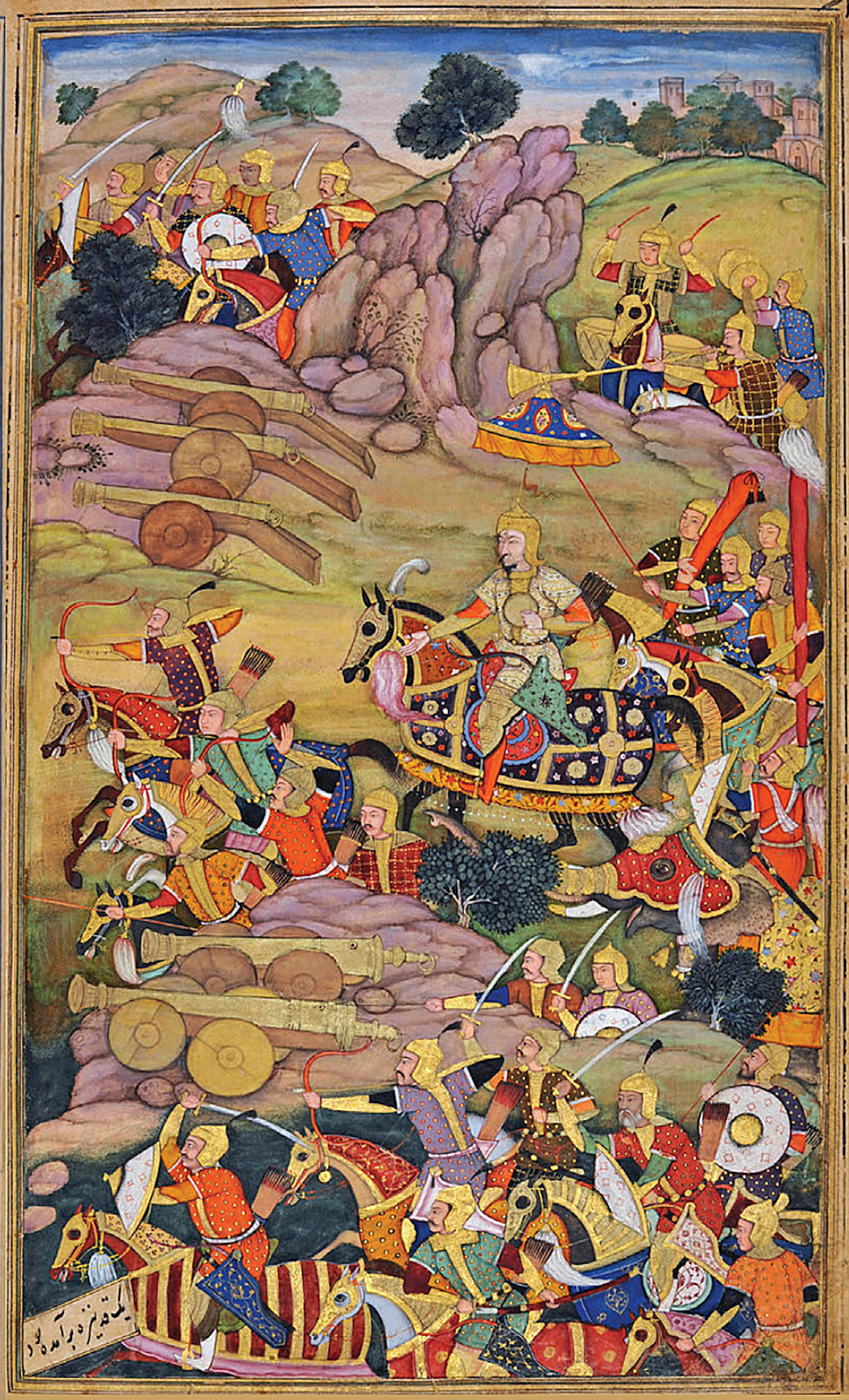
Mughal battle scene, 16th century.

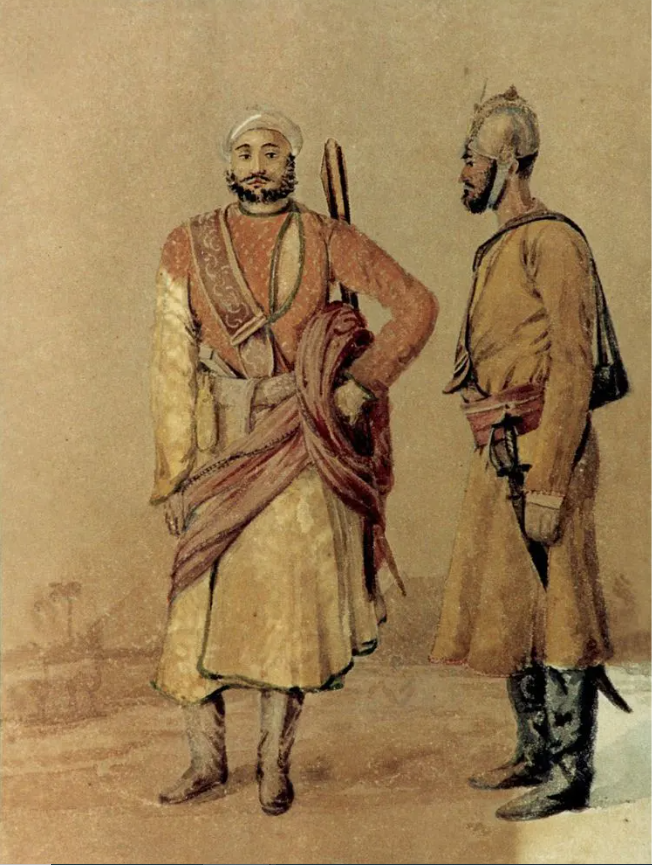
Police in Delhi, 19th century

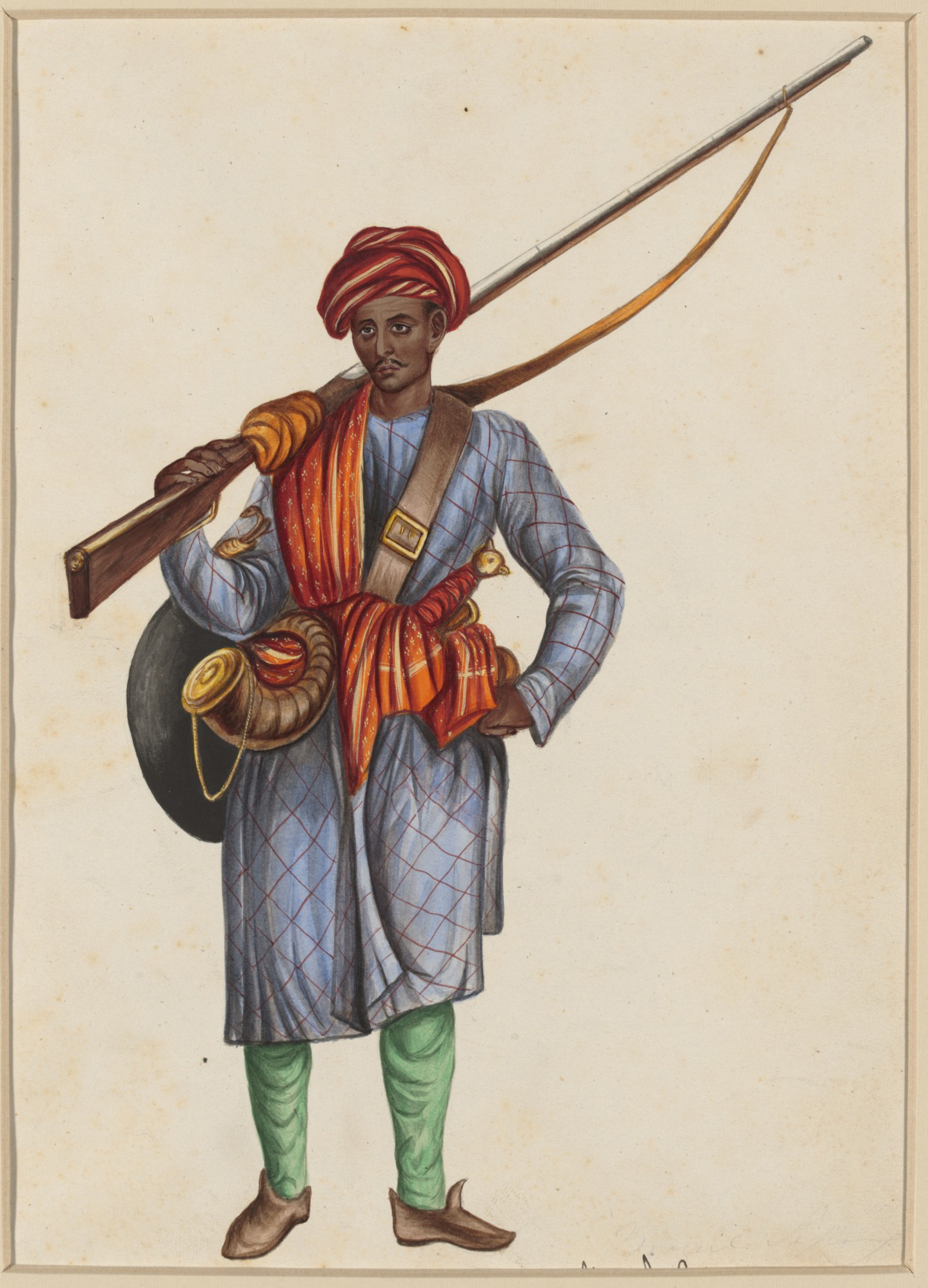
Mughal soldier, 19th century.

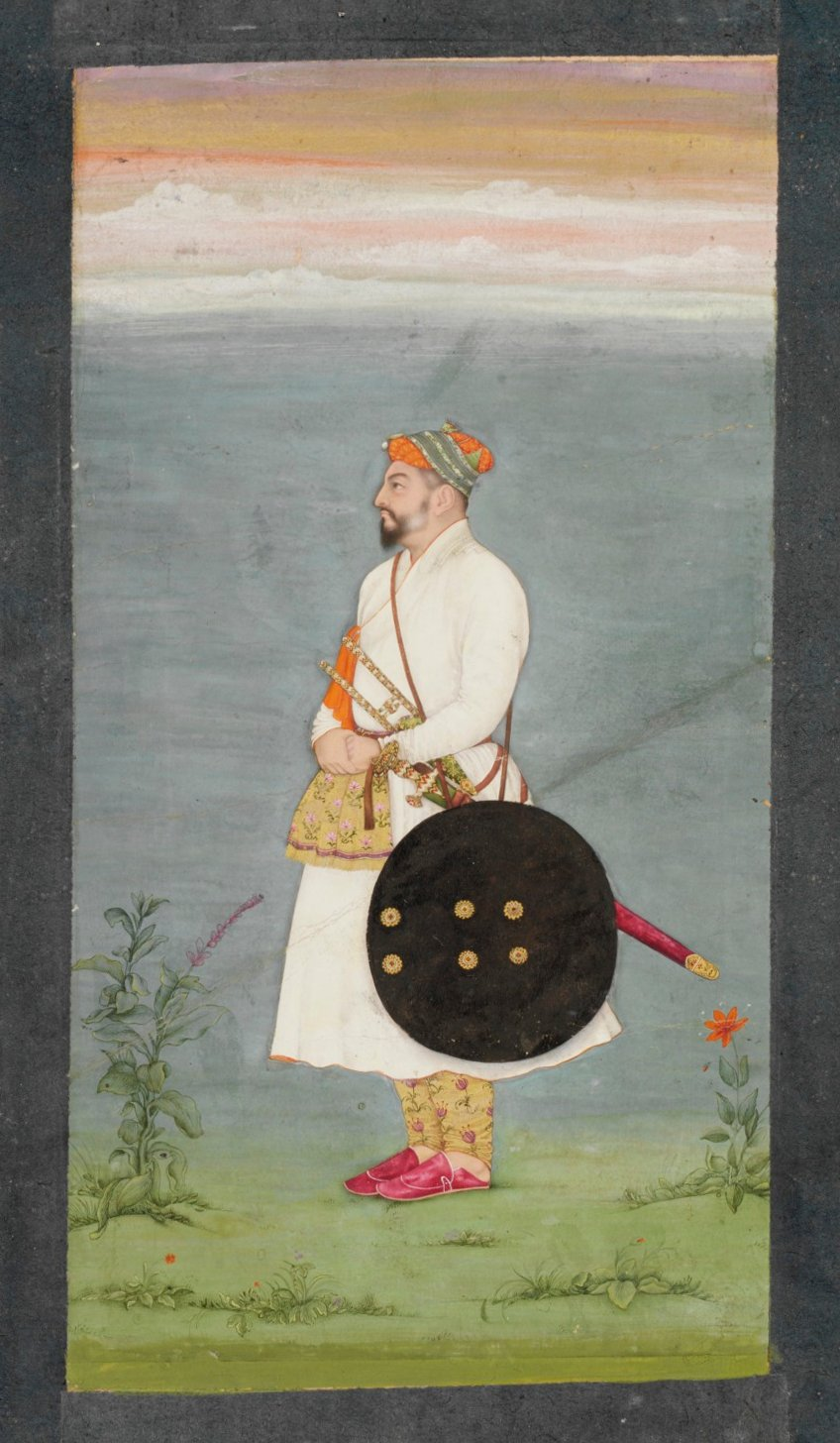
Mughal officer, 17th century.

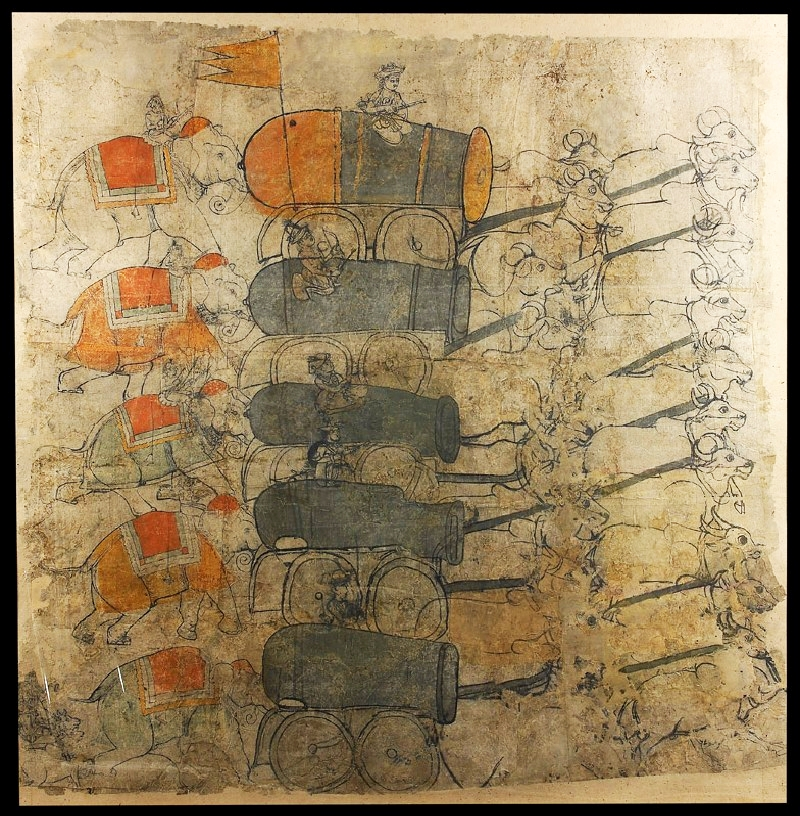
Elephants pushing cannons drawn by bullocks, Kota, mid-18th century.
