= Ballpoint pen knife =

Multi-tool pocketknife with a concealed blade

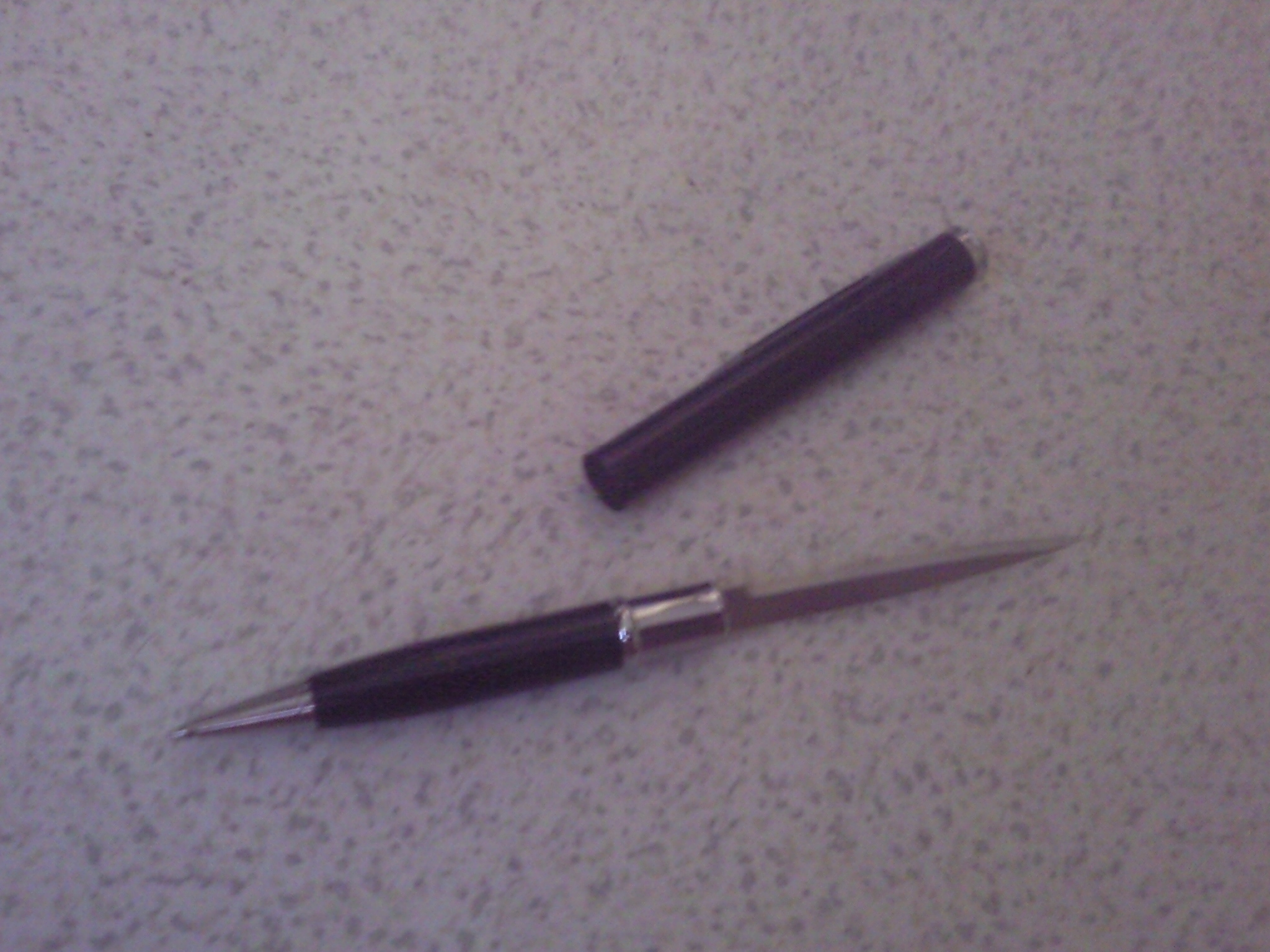
A common ballpoint pen knife with an unsheathed blade

A ballpoint pen knife is a multi-tool pocketknife consisting of a blade concealed inside an ordinary-looking ballpoint pen. Various models and styles of this knife have appeared around the world, and its ownership and import had been regulated and even banned by different nations. Although it can be utilized as a self-defense weapon, there had been cases where it had also been used in crime.

== Characteristics ==
As the name suggests, ballpoint knives are ballpens with a metal blade hidden inside. Most ballpoint pen knives come with straight blades that are fixed to the topmost part of the pen, hidden inside a hollow cap, which served as both the pen's end and the knife's sheath. Common blades may be the single-edged thrusting type, the double-edged dagger type, or even an unsharpened stiletto type point that can only thrust. Some models have thinner, almost needle-like blades to puncture and wound.

== Functions ==
The first iteration of the knife were custom-made and originally designed for use in espionage, before being mass-produced by various knife companies into a tool for self-defense. However, there had also been cases of ballpoint pen knives being used in violent crime. The most infamous occurred in the United Kingdom in 1996, when a former model and barmaid named Tracie Andrews stabbed her fiancé, Lee Raymond Dean Harvey, more than 30 times with a ballpoint pen knife hidden in her boot, during an argument inside their vehicle. A Filipino police named Rogen Cain was also suspended in 2026 after beating and stabbing his romantic partner with a tactical ballpen knife, leading to her miscarriage.

== Legality ==
Since ballpoint pen knives allow a blade to be disguised as an innocuous object, they have been subjected restrictions or prohibitions in several jurisdictions. The U.S. Customs Service included the pen in their manual for concealed and disguised weapons. In the United Kingdom, they are illegal to own and sell. The Philippines had also enacted various local and national laws concerning the carrying of the item.

== See also ==
- Pen gun
- Swordstick
