= Sleeve gun =

Small firearm

Sleeve gun and wrist gun are generic terms for a small firearm designed to be concealed under a long-sleeved coat or jacket—in fictional examples there is often a device with a mechanism to extend it out into the hand to fire.

== Real examples ==
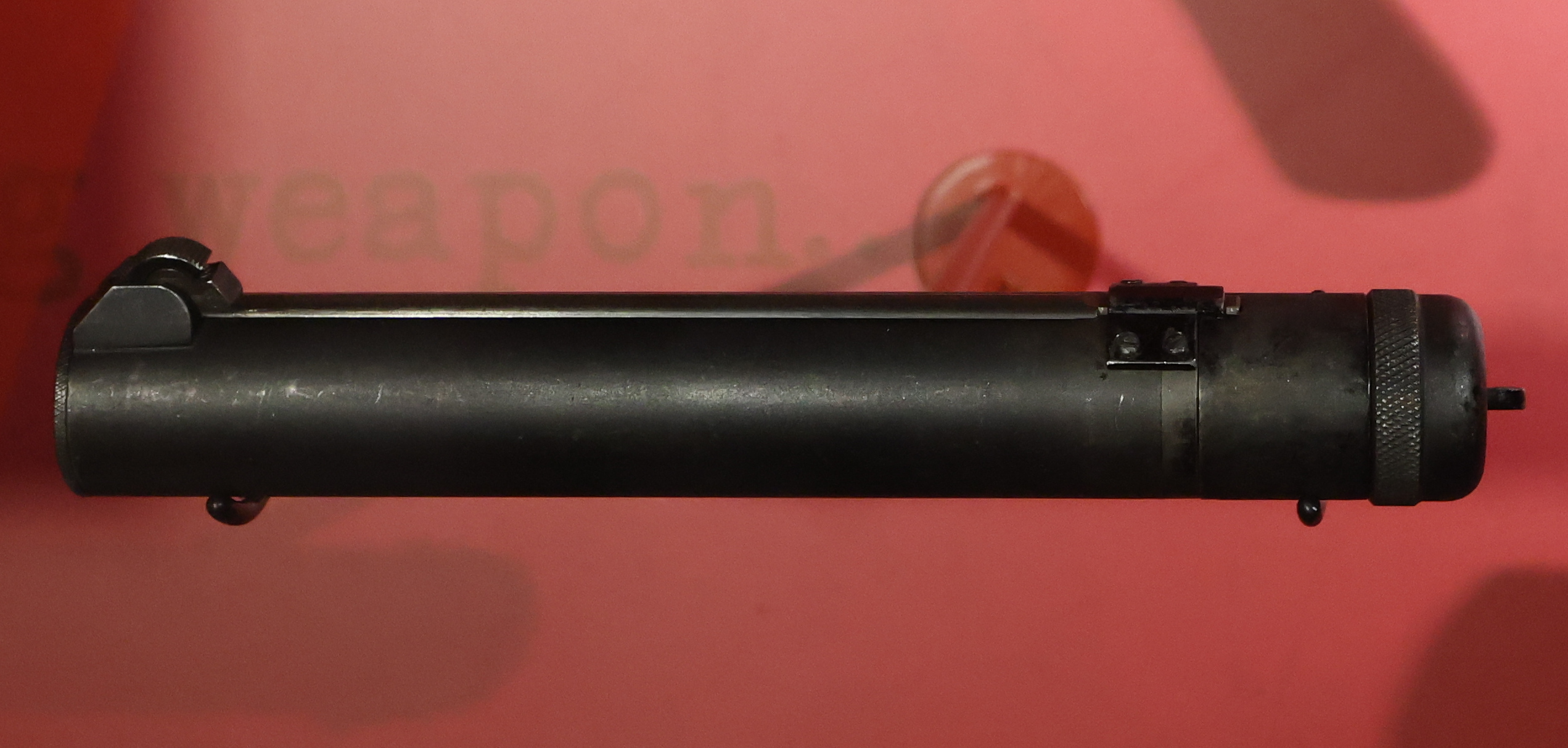
The Welwand sleeve gun Mk II in .32 ACP in an unfired condition

The "sleeve gun" was developed during World War II by Station IX of the Special Operations Executive. The design was by Hugh Reeves. It was essentially a version of the noise-suppressed Welrod pistol, minus the pistol grip, and produced in both .32 ACP and 9×19mm. Between 150 and 200 of the guns were manufactured almost certainly by Birmingham Small Arms Company. A Mark 1 version was designed but it is unclear if it ever made it off the drawing board.

== Fictional examples ==
Though designs vary, most fictional sleeve guns involve a small conventional pistol on a sliding or telescoping rail, which quickly releases the weapon into the hand for firing, either by a trigger mechanism, or just the sudden movement of the forearm. Such sleeve guns have appeared in multiple media.

=== Comics ===
- Gunsmith Cats (1990–1997)
- Punisher Back to School Special (1992–1994)
- Blade of the Phantom Master (2001–2007)

=== Films ===
- Mr. Wong in Chinatown (1939)
- The Sheriff of Fractured Jaw (1958)
- Taxi Driver (1976)
- Moonraker (1979)
- Blood Debts (1985)
- Red Heat (1988)
- The Adventures of Ford Fairlane (1990)
- Aces: Iron Eagle III (1992)
- Maverick (1994)
- Desperado (1995)
- Alien Resurrection (1997)
- Equilibrium (2002)
- Dead Man's Bluff (2005)
- Hot Fuzz (2007)
- Sukiyaki Western Django (2007)
- Sherlock Holmes (2009)
- Django Unchained (2012)
- The Ministry of Ungentlemanly Warfare (2024)

==== Television ====
- The Wild Wild West (1965–1969)
- Hogan's Heroes (1965–1971)
- Jumanji (1996–1999)
- Archer (2009–2023)
- NCIS: Los Angeles (2009–2023)
- Justified (2010–2015)
- The Walking Dead (2010–2022)
- Fargo (2014–present)
- Timeless (2016–2018)
- Vice Principals (2016–2017)
- Gotham (2014–2019)
- Warrior (2019–2023)
- Stargirl (2020-2022)
- Walker (2021–present)
- The Legend of Vox Machina (2022-present)

=== Video Games ===
- Assassin's Creed II (2009)
- Assassin's Creed: Brotherhood (2010)
- Assassin's Creed: Revelations (2011)

== See also ==
- Cane gun
- Pen gun
- Wallet gun
