= Poacher's gun =

Easily concealable firearm

The poacher's gun is a concealable firearm predominantly used by poachers in Northern England from the 18th until the early 20th century for bagging rabbits, squirrels, partridges, rooks, pigeons, and other small game animals. The contemporary cane gun had a similar look and function, but it was designed to resemble a walking stick, rather than for compactness and ease of concealment.

== 18th century ==
The first poachers' guns were built around a military surplus flintlock horse pistol. Muzzle loading guns of this type were both common and relatively affordable for a working-class man as these were frequently brought back by soldiers returning from the wars with the French, and either sold or exchanged for gin at one of the many pawn shops or taverns. The Industrial Revolution equipped workers with what had previously been considered advanced metalworking skills. With tools smuggled home from the workplace such as a tap and die and a few files, concealable hunting weapons could be fabricated at home. The original poacher's gun had a threaded barrel extension and a detachable buttstock similar to a modern takedown gun. The three parts were concealed in the owner's coat until needed. By concealing the weapon's parts, being seen by a gamekeeper or constable was less likely to result in arrest for armed trespass. This was a serious crime during the 18th century that was usually punished with transportation to Australia.

== 19th century ==
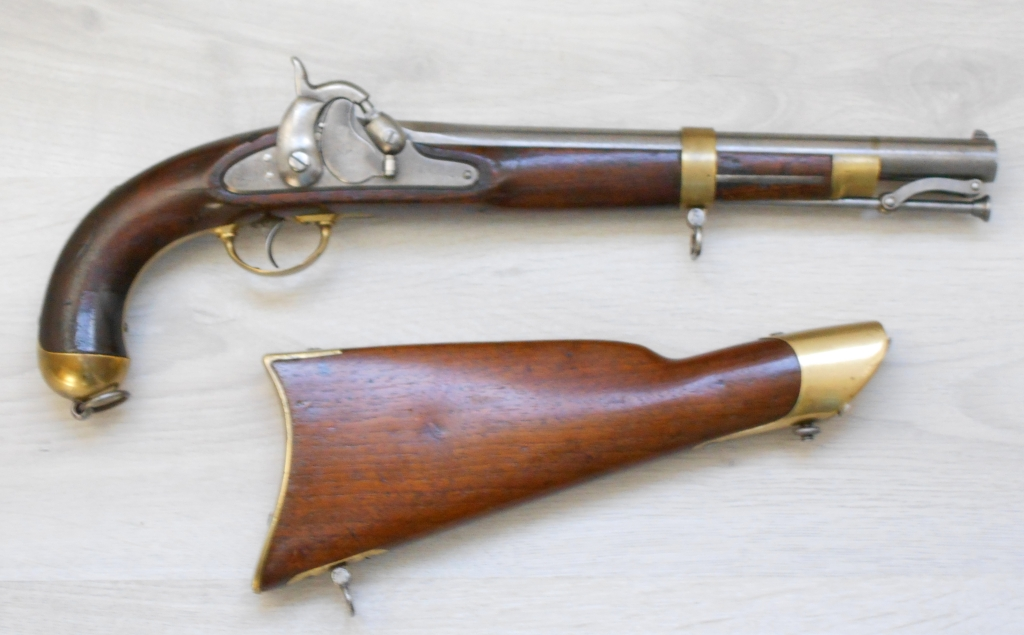
US Cavalry pistol-carbine

During the Indian Wars of the mid 19th century, the American army issued a horse pistol to the cavalry with a detachable buttstock. By attaching the stock, the Springfield Model 1855 pistol could be converted into a carbine with superior range and accuracy when skirmishing on foot.

As technology improved during the Victorian era, more advanced types of poacher's gun were commercially produced for use with paper and brass cartridges. Rifled barrels also started to be developed. Poachers guns of this era included folding break action rook rifles or .410 shotguns with a barrel that was the same length as the buttstock. Guns of this type were used not only by poachers, but also by farmers for vermin control, and children learning to shoot.

== Modern use ==
The .22 Armalite AR-7 survival rifle issued to both the Israeli Defence Force pilots and American aircrew personnel is similar in function to the early poachers' guns. The receiver, magazine, and barrel can be dismounted and stored in the buttstock. A civilian version that can be attached to a backpack is popular among hikers, fishermen and survivalists in America.

== See also ==
- Alarm gun, a crude tripwire activated blunderbuss used during the 18th century to frighten or maim poachers and grave robbers.
