= Pen gun =

Firearm that resembles an ink pen

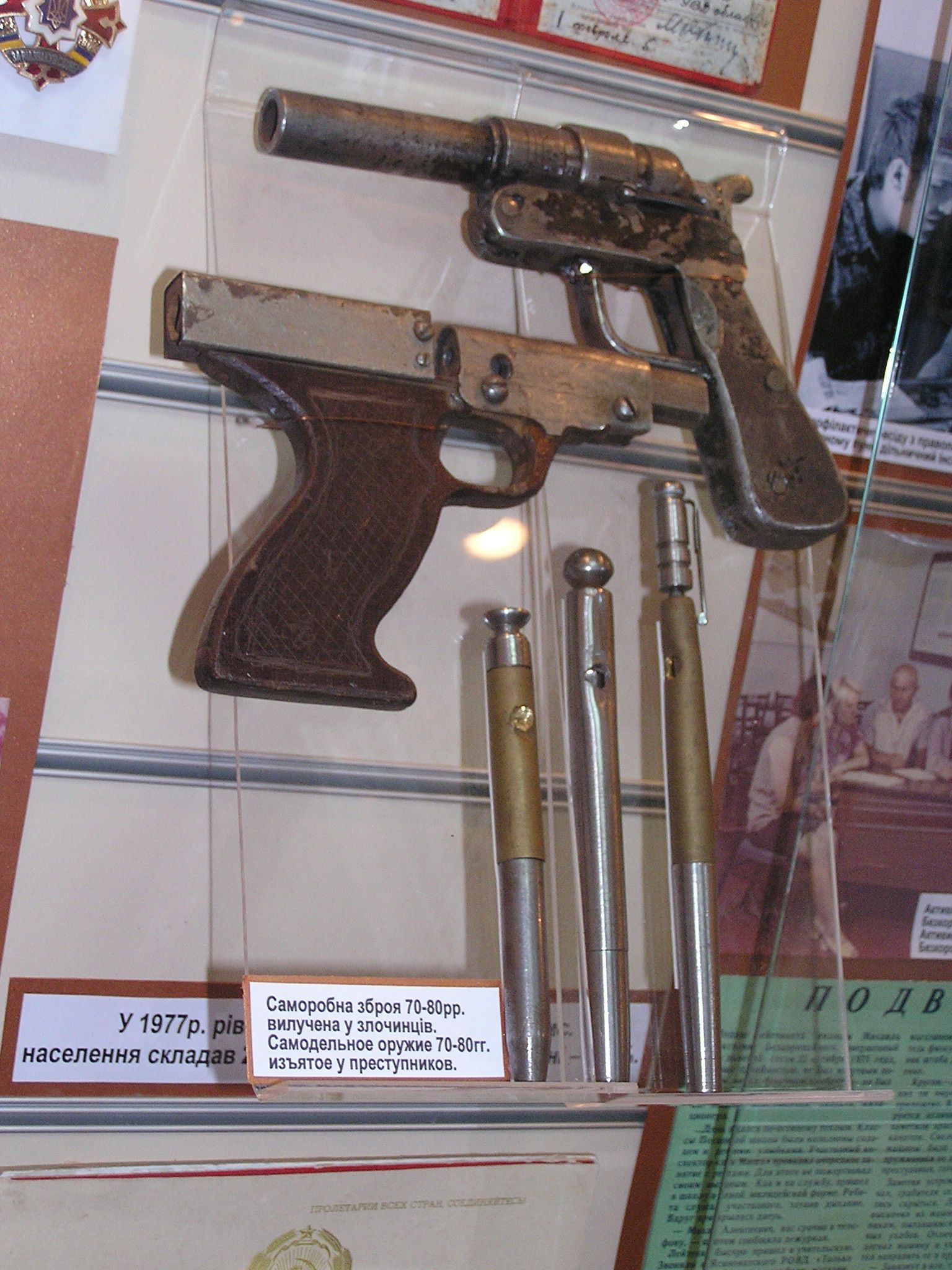
Homemade pen guns (Museum of the History of Donetsk militsiya).

A pen gun is a firearm that resembles an ink pen. They generally are of small caliber (e.g., .22 LR, .25 ACP, .32 ACP, .380 ACP caliber, etc.) and are single shot. Early examples of pen guns were pinfired, but modern designs are rim or centerfire. Some pen guns are not designed to fire regular cartridges, but rather blank cartridges, signal flares, or tear gas cartridges.

== History ==
=== Pen guns requiring NFA registration ===
In the United States, pen guns that can fire bullet or shot cartridges and do not require a reconfiguration to fire (e.g., folding to the shape of a pistol) are federally regulated as an Any Other Weapon (Title II). They require registration under the National Firearms Act and a tax in the amount of five dollars is levied.

=== Pen guns not requiring NFA registration ===
Others, such as the "Stinger" pen gun designed by the R.J. "Bob" Braverman company and manufactured by Remcon North Corp. based out of Meredith, NH, made a pen gun which was not required to be registered under the NFA. The Stinger pen gun first had patent filed in 1991 was made until production ceased in 1996 as a result of business pressures and government regulation. In 2002 the pen gun was revived by a company in Michigan called Stinger Manufacturing Corp, this company then also subsequently folded or stopped making the Stinger single-shot pen guns. The stinger pen gun folded, cocked, and popped out a trigger in a single motion, and since it was then in a 90-degree angle and looked more like a traditional "pistol", it was not considered a "Any Other Weapon" firearm. These pen guns and others are somewhat rare in the firearm second-hand marketplace and have therefore become highly collectible fetching prices ranging from $1,000 to $3,000 or more.

According to the FBI, pen guns were widely available for self-defense in the 20th century.

== See also ==
- Ballpoint pen knife
- Cane gun
- Sleeve gun
- Wallet gun
