= Destructive device =

Device regulated by the US National Firearms Act

In the United States, a destructive device is a type of firearm or explosive device regulated by the National Firearms Act of 1934, revised by the Omnibus Crime Control and Safe Streets Act of 1968 and Gun Control Act of 1968.

Examples of destructive devices include grenades, grenade launchers, artillery weapons, and firearms (2) any type of weapon by whatever name known which will, or which may be readily converted to, expel a projectile by the action of an explosive or other propellant, the barrel or barrels of which have a bore over one half of an inch (.50 inches or 12.7 mm), excluding some rifles and most shotguns, both semi automatic and manually operated. While current federal laws allow destructive devices, some states have banned them from transfer to civilians. In states where banned, only law enforcement officers and military personnel are allowed to possess them.

All National Firearms Act firearms including destructive devices, must be registered with the Bureau of Alcohol, Tobacco, Firearms and Explosives.

The definition of a "destructive device" is found in 26 U.S.C. § 5845(f). The definition reads as follows:

(1) any explosive, incendiary, or poison gas, (A) bomb, (B) grenade, (C) rocket having a propellant charge of more than 4 ounces, (D) missile having an explosive charge of more than 1/4 ounce (109.4 grains or 7.09 grams), (E) mine or (F) similar device.

(2) Any weapon by whatever name known which will, or which may be readily converted to, expel a projectile by the action of an explosive or other propellant, the barrel or barrels of which have a bore of more than one-half inch in diameter (.50 inches or 12.7 mm), except a shotgun or shotgun shell which the Secretary finds is generally recognized as particularly suitable for sporting purposes; and

(3) Any combination of parts either designed or intended for use in converting any device into a destructive device as defined in subparagraphs (1) and (2) and from which a destructive device may be readily assembled.

The term destructive device shall not include any device which is neither designed nor redesigned for use as a weapon; any device, although originally designed for use as a weapon, which is redesigned for use as a signaling, pyrotechnic, line throwing, safety or similar device; surplus ordnance sold, loaned or given by the Secretary of the Army, pursuant to the provisions of section 4684(2), 4685, or 4686 of Title 10 of the United States Code; or any other device the Secretary finds is not likely to be used as a weapon, or is an antique or is a rifle which the owner intends to use solely for sporting purposes.

The term "Secretary" originally referred to the Secretary of the Treasury, as the National Firearms Act is part of the Internal Revenue Code of 1986—since the BATF's transfer to the Department of Justice in 2002, the term "Secretary" now refers to the Attorney General.

Muzzle-loading guns are not considered firearms in the US and do not fall under the regulations of the NFA. However, their projectiles may still be subject to NFA regulation. For instance, a person may manufacture, possess, and fire a black powder, muzzle-loading cannon of any bore diameter, but may not fire explosive shells from that cannon, as the explosive shell is itself defined as a destructive device.

== See also ==
- Title II weapons § Destructive device
