= Gupti =

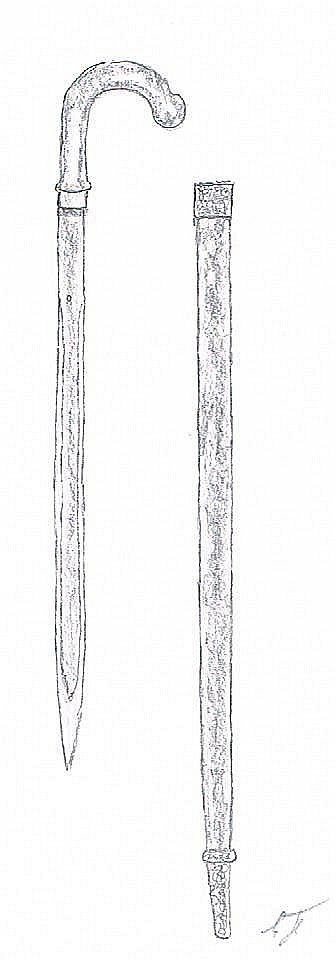
- An illustration of a gupti
- Type: swordstick
- Place of origin: Indian subcontinent

A gupti is a traditional swordstick dagger from India that can be completely concealed in a wooden case and resembles a walking cane or short stick.
