= Swordstick =

Walking stick with a concealed sword

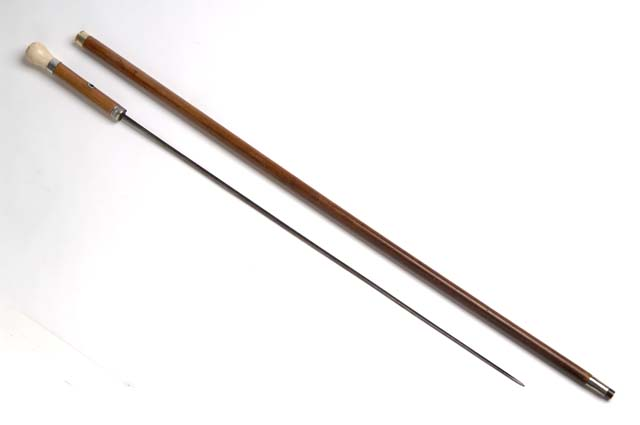
Wood sword cane of Jean Baptiste Faribault

A swordstick or cane-sword is a cane containing a hidden blade or sword. The wood of the cane therefore functions as the blade's scabbard, while the handle and head function as the hilt. The term is typically used to describe European weapons from around the 18th century, but similar devices have been used throughout history, notably the Roman dolon, the Japanese shikomizue and the Indian gupti.

Use of the European swordstick contrasts against the martial art of cane-fighting, the use of unmodified walking sticks for non-lethal self-defense.

== History ==
A precedent for the swordstick would be used by 17th century spy Alonso de Contreras, who would hide a sword inside a staff while disguised as a pilgrim. The swordstick became a popular fashion accessory for the wealthy during the 18th and 19th centuries. During this period, it was becoming less socially acceptable to openly carry a sword, but there were still upper-class men routinely trained in swordsmanship who wished to go armed for self-defense. Swords concealed in ladies' walking sticks and parasols were also not unknown, as it was even less socially acceptable for a lady to carry a sword, or publicly admit that she knew how to use one.

Soon after their introduction, other "gadget canes" became popular. Instead of a blade, these would hold the tools of one's trade, compasses, and even flasks for keeping alcohol.

== Construction ==
Malacca wood was the most commonly used material in making the cane shafts, and the standard grip was rounded and metallic.

Today, designer and collector canes have sterling silver handles, and are made with wooden shafts made from various woods, including Malacca and bamboo. Ornate designs, such as animal heads, skulls, and various emblems may also be carved into the wooden handles; these may make them harder to wield, but some find them more attractive. Sword canes are most often made with rapier-pointed blades.

A bespoke swordstick maker in South Africa constructs canes and walking sticks of light but exceptionally strong carbon fiber, or titanium, often with an ornately engraved silver or wood head, concealing an 18 inch stainless steel blade.

== Practicality ==
The utility of a sword-stick for self-defense is questionable. A 19th-century English expert on fencing, boxing, and close-quarters self-defense, R. G. Allanson-Winn, opined:

[t]he sword-stick is an instrument I thoroughly detest and abominate, and could not possibly advocate the use of in any circumstance whatever... They are poor things as regards length and strength, and 'not in it' with a good stick... The hollowing out of the cane, to make the scabbard, renders them almost useless for hitting purposes.

Allanson-Winn's objection may also reflect the prevailing view of concealed daggers as ungentlemanly, "of shady reputation": the weapon of a ruffian or "hasty hot-tempered individual" for the "shedding of blood over some trivial, senseless squabble."

Allanson-Winn's collaborator in self-defense training, C. Phillips Wolley of the English Inns of Court School of Arms, took a different, perhaps even opposite view: a thrusting weapon is too deadly. The rapier imported from France and Spain displaced the native English and Scots broad-sword and sabre because "English swordsmen realized that the point was much more deadly than the edge." However, carrying a sword-cane designed only for a fatal thrust is problematic: the laws of self-defense require if possible to disable, not to kill.

Instead these 19th-century experts recommended as more practical an ordinary walking-stick of Irish blackthorn, sans blade: strong, supple, and in skilled hands (that is, someone trained in fencing), decisive. A bladeless walking stick or cane has the additional advantage that it is not an illegal concealed weapon (see below).

== Legality ==
In many jurisdictions the ownership, carrying, manufacturing or trading in sword canes is restricted by law.

=== Belgium ===
Possession of a swordstick is prohibited in Belgium as it falls under concealed weapons.

=== France ===
Having a swordstick is considered as having weapons of the 6th category. It is legal to own, but specific care must be taken in case of transportation.

=== Germany ===
Handling of swordsticks (including those with short blades) is forbidden as concealed weapons.

=== Ireland ===
In Ireland, the manufacture, importation, sale, hire, or loan of swordsticks are prohibited under the Firearms and Offensive Weapons Act 1990.

=== New Zealand ===
Swordsticks are considered a prohibited offensive weapon in New Zealand.

=== United Kingdom ===
The Criminal Justice Act 1988 also made it illegal to trade in sword canes in the United Kingdom. However, antique swordsticks which are 100 years old or older are exempt.

It is illegal to:

- sell a knife to anyone under 18, unless it has a folding blade 3 inches long (7.62 cm) or less
- carry a knife in public without good reason, unless it has a folding blade with a cutting edge 3 inches long or less
- carry, buy or sell any type of banned knife (of which sword sticks are one)
- use any knife in a threatening way (even a legal knife)

=== United States ===
U.S. law on swordsticks is inconsistent, varying state-by-state, and currently it is in flux.

Examples of U.S. states with statutes that expressly prohibit the carrying of swordsticks include Arkansas (Ark. Code Ann. § 5-73-120(b)(3)(B)), California (Cal Pen Code § 12020(a)(1), New York (§ 265.01) and Massachusetts (269 § 12).

Other state laws do not prohibit swordsticks per se, but would include them under a general ban on carrying a hidden or disguised knife. An example is Virginia Code §18.2-308 which prohibits concealed dirks, stiletto knives, and "any weapon of like kind," considered "hidden from common observation when it is observable but is of such deceptive appearance as to disguise the weapon's true nature."

Some states recently removed statutory restrictions on sword canes, including Montana in a 2017 amendment to M.C.A. 45-8-316, Oklahoma in 2016, 21 Okl. St.Ann. § 1272, and Ohio in 2021, which removed possession and carry restrictions on essentially all knives.

With U.S. constitutional law evolving on the U.S. 2nd Amendment right to keep and bear arms, and a demonstrable tradition of carrying swordsticks in the late 18th century when the Constitution was adopted, at least one commentator believes the state law trend will be in the direction of less restriction.

== See also ==
- Ballpoint pen knife
- Cane gun
- Canne de combat
- Makila
- Stick-fighting
- Swordsmanship
- Walking stick
