= Cane gun =

Walking stick with a hidden gun

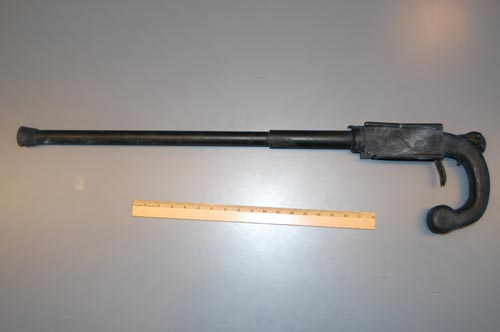
A cane-like shotgun used by Brian Douglas Wells

A cane gun is a walking cane with a hidden gun built into it. Cane guns are sometimes mistaken for similar-looking "poacher's guns".

These are usually a more portable and more easily concealed version of conventional sporting guns, commonly a single- or double-barreled shotgun, based on the relatively inexpensive Belgian Leclercq action.

With this and similar designs, a folding short-barrelled shotgun can be made to fold back until it lies beneath the stock, so that it can be carried under a coat. An alternative form is in effect a very long-barrelled pistol fitted with a detachable, sometimes called "take-down", or folding skeleton stock, though any sporting weapon that requires assembly has obvious drawbacks in the field.

In purely practical terms, the distinction is that cane guns, far more costly to produce and, generally speaking, an affectation, ostensibly carried by gentlemen who wished, at all times, to be able to take "targets of opportunity", were a curio, a talking point, or a concealed offensive weapon, one that might easily escape detection unless closely examined. In addition to gentleman's canes, guns have also been concealed in other common items such as umbrellas and walking sticks.

By contrast, a poacher's gun is very obviously a firearm, albeit one easily concealed by those legitimately going about in the countryside unarmed, by those who carried a gun for ad hoc hunting for the pot or for self-defense, as opposed to a far-less-portable, pure-game gun, though these cross into the survival category.

Cane guns are now very rare and difficult to find, since most contravene legislation prohibiting carrying concealed weapons, and period examples, where permitted, are, generally speaking, in the hands of private collectors and museums.

Modern, cartridge-type cane guns are usually fitted to fire large, low-pressure handgun cartridges or .410 bore up to 12-gauge shotgun shells, both of which are well-suited in a weapon that is effectively just a barrel with an integrated chamber, manual ejection, a detachable firing mechanism, a rudimentary grip, and in some cases primitive sights.

Other types of cane guns have been produced as air weapons, generally using some form of detachable pressurized air reservoir (a pneumatic air weapon) in the form of a flask, or integrated into the form of a more generously proportioned stick, such as a traditional shillelagh. Some are effectively dart-firing blowpipes, which are far easier to disguise, being little more than a hollow tube. The weapon was used during a bank robbery in the Pizza Bomber Case.

According to the ATF, cane guns, sword guns, and umbrella guns are classified as AOW (any other weapons).

== In fiction ==
Cane guns have an abiding place in spy culture; a famous example appeared in Ian Fleming's 1953 novel Casino Royale, in which James Bond is threatened with one during his contest at the gaming table with Le Chiffre. The cane gun also appears in the made-for-television adaption of the same name in 1954 as well as in the 1999 Bond movie The World Is Not Enough. A musket ball-firing, front-loading, musket-style cane gun can be found in Abraham Lincoln: Vampire Hunter. The critically acclaimed 2006 video game Saints Row and its sequel Saints Row 2 feature an unlockable "Pimp Cane Shotgun" that alters the players walk cycle when equipped.

== See also ==
- Pen gun
- Sleeve gun
- Swordstick
- Wallet gun
