= Dolon Pass =

- Kyrgyz: Долон ашуусу
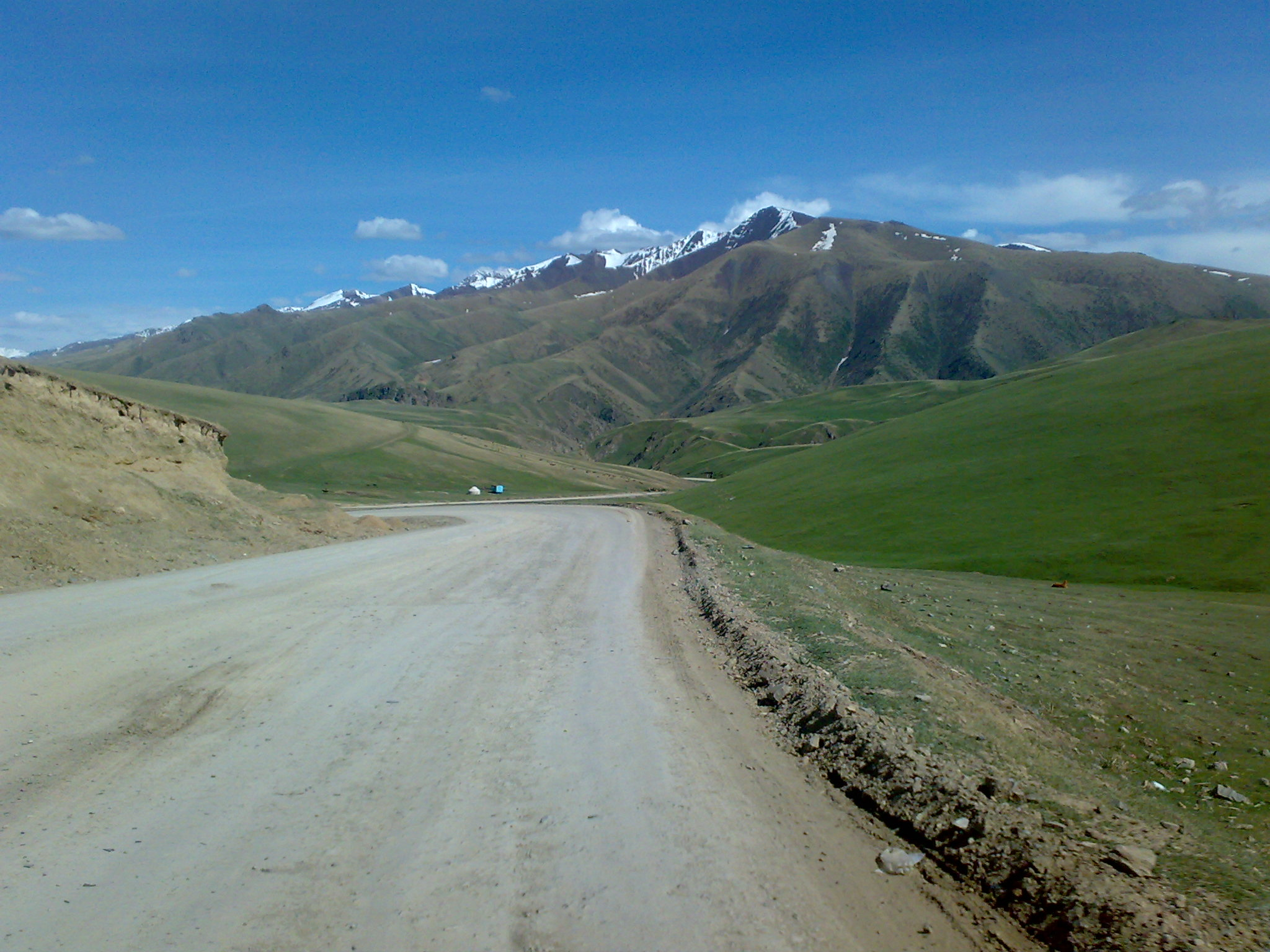
- Dolon Pass: descend to Naryn town

- Location within Kyrgyzstan
- Elevation: 3,030 metres (9,940 ft)
- Traversed by: European route E125 and AH61

Third Approach
- Location: Kyrgyzstan
- Range: between Songköl Too and Bayduluu Range
- Coordinates: 41°50.408′N 75°44.497′E

Dolon Pass (Kyrgyz: Долон ашуусу) is a pass located between the Songköl Too and the Bayduluu Range in Naryn Region, Kyrgyzstan. The pass lies at 3,030 metres (9,940 ft). Highway of international significance ЭМ-11 (as per the national road classification) connecting Bishkek, Balykchy, Naryn, Torugart, and Kyrgyzstan-China border, which is also known as European route E125 and Asian Highway 61 in Kyrgyzstan, traverses the pass.

== In popular culture ==
In Chingiz Aitmatov's novella My Little Poplar in a Red Headscarf (from a collection of stories Tales of the Mountains and Steppes) Dolon Pass is a part of the storyline as a difficult mountain pass.
