= Katta Belisynyk Pass =

- Катта Белисынык
- Location within Kyrgyzstan
- Elevation: 1,324 metres (4,344 ft)

Third Approach
- Location: Kyrgyzstan
- Range: Belisynyk Range
- Coordinates: 40°05′16″N 69°56′58″E

Katta Belisynyk Pass is a pass in the Belisynyk Range of the Batken Region of Kyrgyzstan. Its elevation is 1,324 m (4,344 ft).
