= Ak-Beyit Pass =

- Kyrgyz: Ак-Бейит ашуусу
- Location within Kyrgyzstan
- Elevation: 3,286 m (10,781 ft)
- Traversed by: European route E125, AH61

Location
- Location: Kyrgyzstan
- Range: At-Bashy Range
- Coordinates: 40°47.367′N 75°06.999′E

Ak-Beyit Pass (Kyrgyz: Ак-Бейит ашуусу) is a pass, elevation 3,286 m (10,781 ft), that links At-Bashy Valley and Arpa Valley in Naryn Region of Kyrgyzstan. Highway of international significance ЭМ-11 (as per the national road classification) connecting Bishkek, Balykchy, Naryn, Torugart, and Kyrgyzstan-China border, which is also known as European route E125 and Asian Highway 61 in Kyrgyzstan, traverses the pass.
