= Wallet gun =

Handgun disguised as a wallet

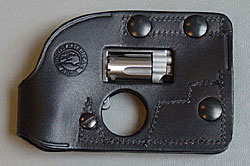
Black wallet holster

A wallet gun is a concealed firearm. It is a small handgun covered in leather or cloth in a wallet shape with openings for the barrel and trigger to disguise it as a wallet (at least at first glance).

== See also ==
- Cane gun
- Derringer
- Pen gun
- Sleeve gun
