= Kyzart (pass) =

Mountain pass in Kyrgyzstan

Kyzart Pass
- Kyrgyz: Кызарт
- Location within Kyrgyzstan
- Elevation: 2,664 metres (8,740 ft)

Third Approach
- Location: Kyrgyzstan
- Range: between and
- Coordinates: 42°05′38″N 75°08′18″E

Kyzart Pass (Kyrgyz: Кызарт, in Kyrgyz "Кыз" meaning girl, "Арт" - pass; "girl's pass") is a pass located between the Kum-Bel and the Baba-Ata ranges in Naryn Region of Kyrgyzstan. It connects Kochkor and Jumgal valleys. The elevation of the pass which is kept open all year round is 2,664 m (8,740 ft). The eastern slope is gentle, and the western is steep. Highway of international significance ЭМ-18 (as per the national road classification, former A-367) connecting Kochkor, Chaek, Suusamyr and Töö Ashuu traverses the pass.
