= Songköl Too =

Coordinates: 41.8779°N 75.5452°E

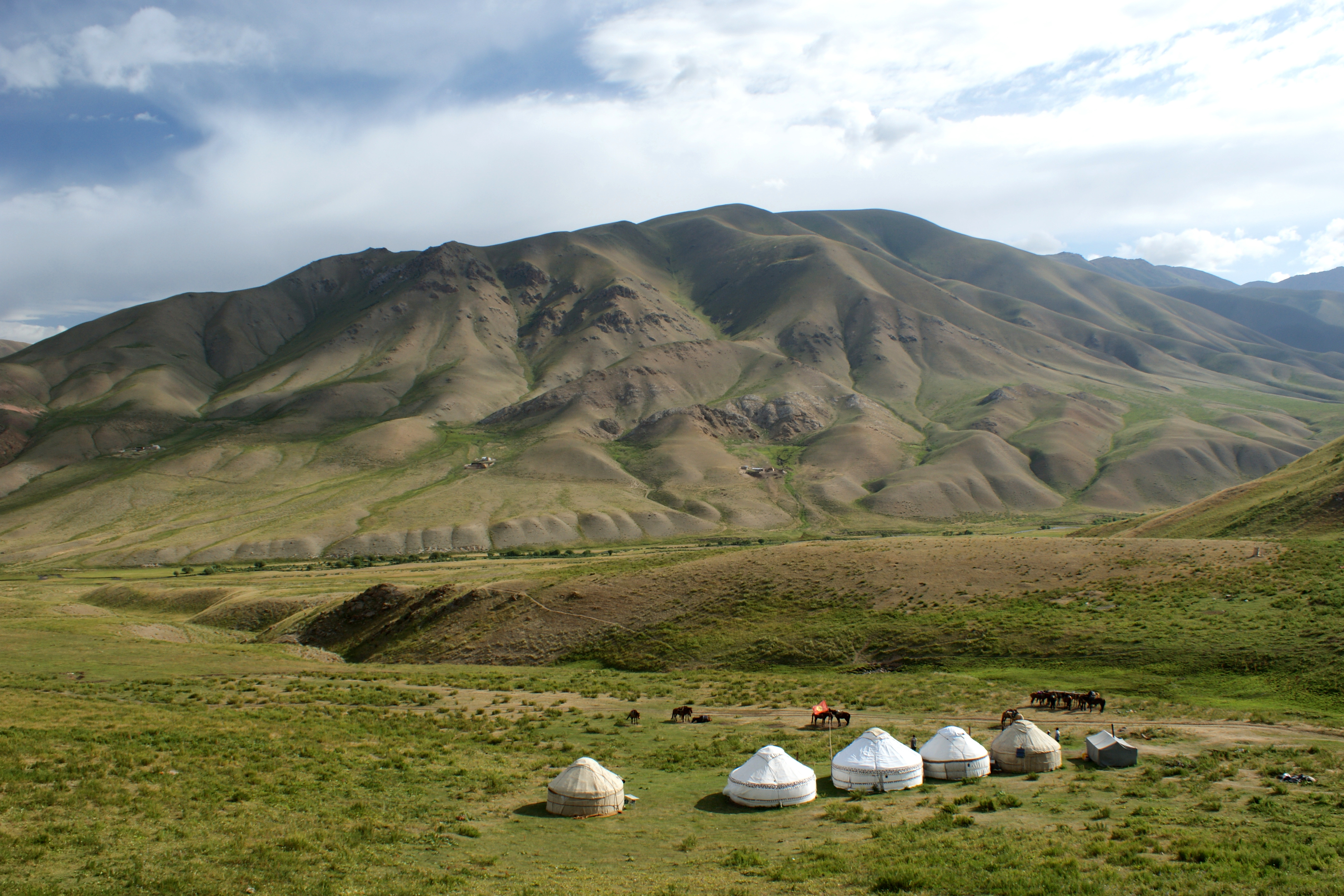
- Yurt Camp in the Songköl Too range

Highest point
- Elevation: 3,856 m (12,651 ft)

Dimensions
- Length: 92 km (57 mi) E-W
- Width: 9 km (5.6 mi)

Naming
- Native name: Соңкөл тоосу (Kyrgyz)

Geography
- Location within Kyrgyzstan
- Country: Kyrgyzstan
- Region: Naryn Region
- District(s): Kochkor District, Jumgal District

Geology
- Rock type: limestone

Songköl Too (Kyrgyz: Соңкөл тоосу) is a range in the Internal Tien-Shan that arcuately frames Songköl Valley from the north and separates Songköl Valley with Song Kol Lake from Jumgal Valley, and Telek Valley. It is located in Jumgal and Kochkor districts of Naryn Region. The length of the range is 92 kilometres (57 mi), and width up to 9 kilometres (5.6 mi). Average altitudes are 3,560 metres (11,680 ft) and the maximum altitude - 3,856 metres (12,651 ft). Difference in elevation between Songköl Too and Songköl Valley - 500–600 metres (1,600–2,000 ft), and between Songköl Too and Jumgal Valley - 1,400–1,600 metres (4,600–5,200 ft). Picks are gentle in the western part of the range and rocky - in the eastern. The northern slopes are steep and sharply rugged, and southern ones are gentle. The range is composed by majorly limestone.
