= Kichi-Kemin Valley =

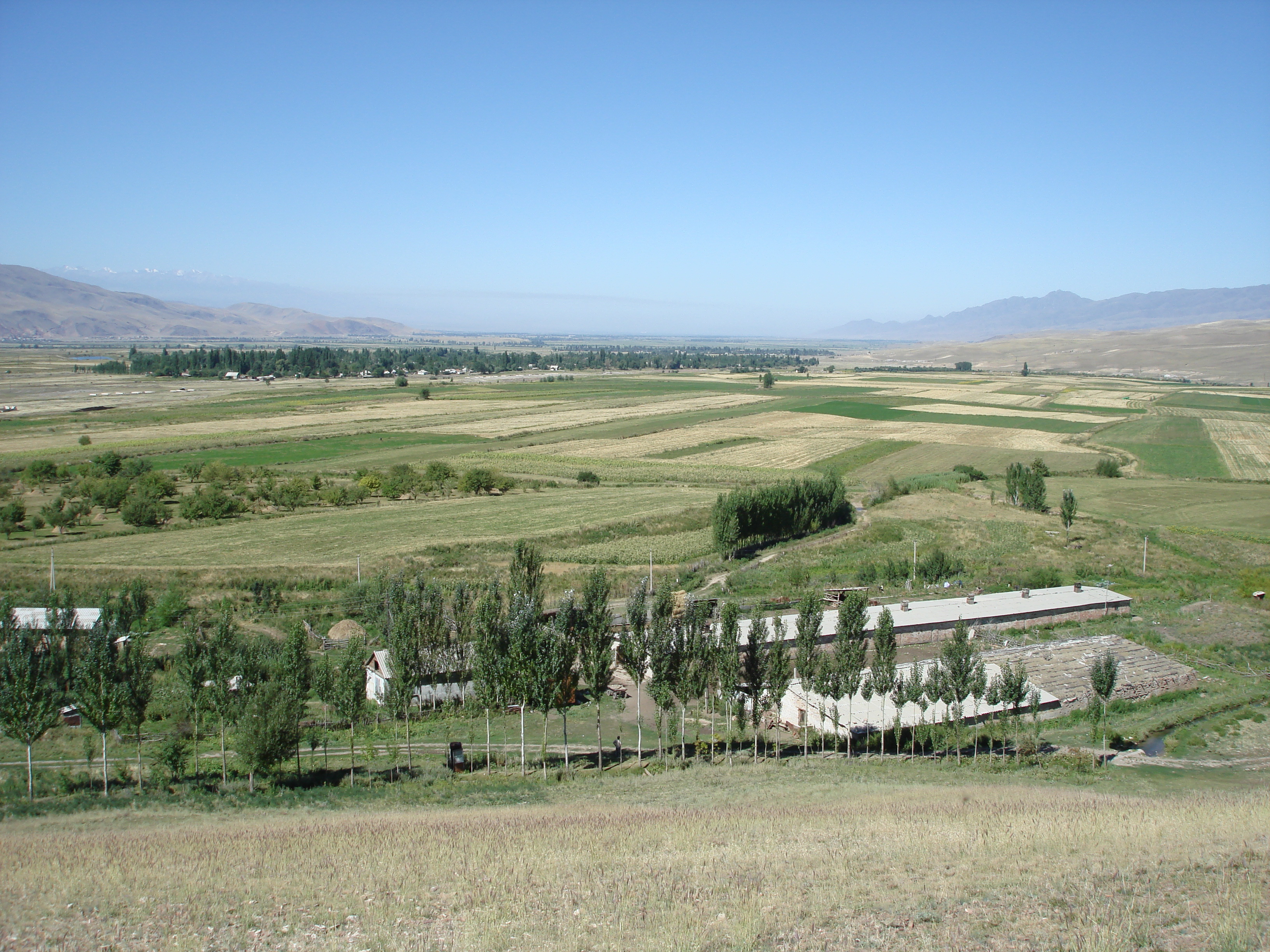
- Kichi-Kemin Valley
- Area: 160 square kilometres (62 sq mi)

Geography
- Location: Kyrgyzstan, Chüy Region
- Coordinates: 42°47′N 76°00′E
- Rivers: Kichi-Kemin
- Interactive map of Kichi-Kemin Valley

The Kichi-Kemin Valley (Kyrgyz: Кичи-Кемин өрөөнү) is located in the east part of Chüy Valley in north Kyrgyzstan between mountains Kastek and Kemin. The middle part of the valley is flat, and the western part – terraced plain. The river Kichi-Kemin flows through the valley. There are a number of settlements located in the valley: Boroldoy, Ilyich, Jangy-Jol, Kichi-Kemin, Kara-Bulak, Beysheke and Ak-Tüz.
