= Kichi-Kemin (river) =

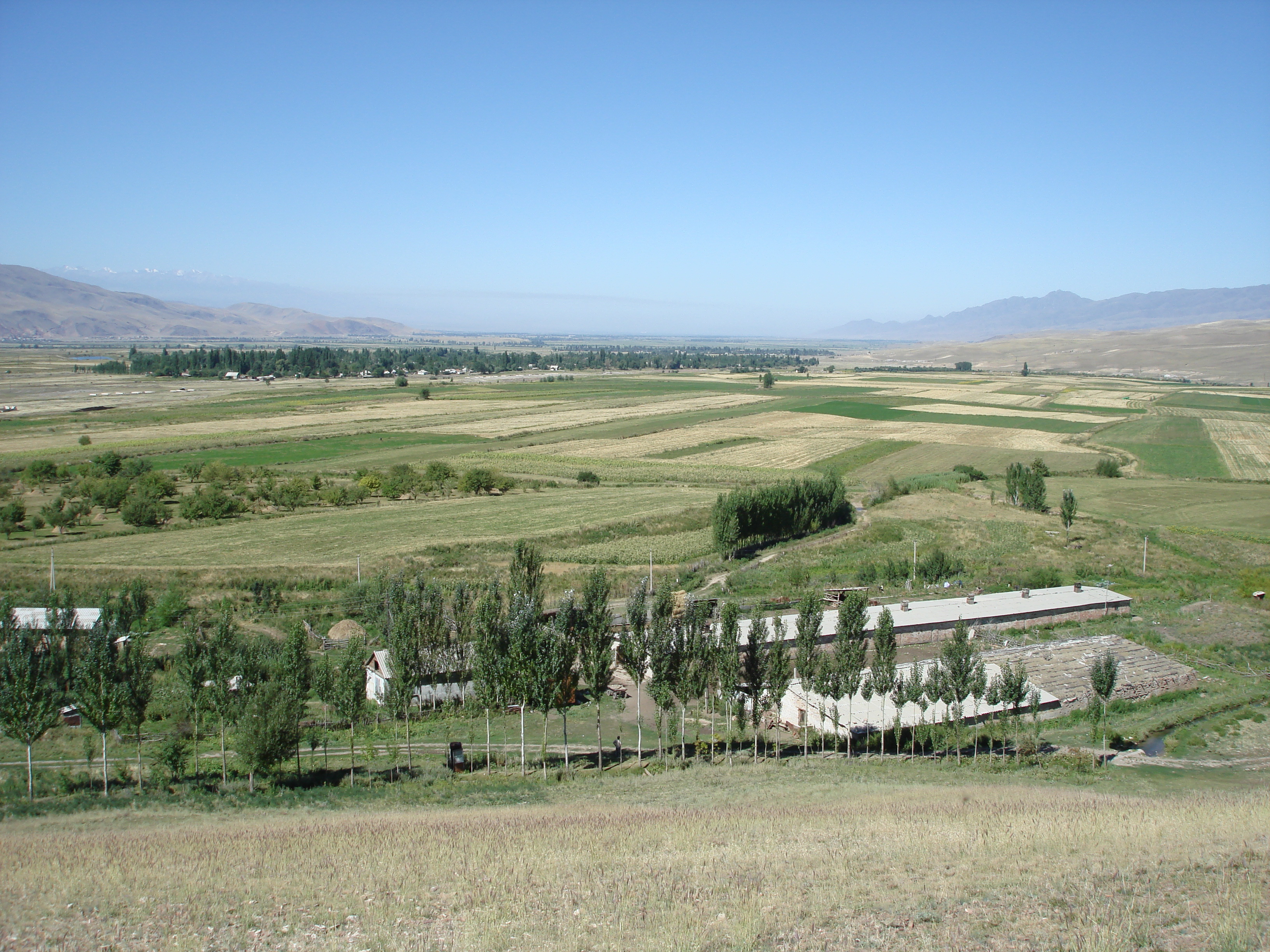
- Native name: Кичи-Кемин (Kyrgyz)

Location
- Country: Kyrgyzstan, Kazakhstan

Physical characteristics
- Source
  - location: Kyrgyzstan
  - coordinates: 42°51′53″N 76°18′25″E
  - elevation: 3,495 m (11,467 ft)
- Mouth: Chu
  - location: Kyrgyzstan
  - coordinates: 42°49′52″N 75°33′25″E
  - elevation: 1,001 m (3,284 ft)
- Length: 81 km (50 mi)
- Basin size: 614 km^{2} (237 sq mi)
- Discharge
  - average: 2.10 m^{3}/s (74 cu ft/s)
  - minimum: 0.46 m^{3}/s (16 cu ft/s)
  - maximum: 8.63 m^{3}/s (305 cu ft/s)

Basin features
- Progression: Chu→ Betpak-Dala desert

The Kichi-Kemin (Kyrgyz: Кичи-Кемин) is a river in Kemin District of Chüy Region of Kyrgyzstan and Korday District of Kazakhstan. It is a right tributary of the Chu in Chüy Valley. It is 81 kilometres (50 mi) long with a basin area of 614 square kilometres (237 mi^{2}). The flow of the Kichi-Kemin considerably varies; the minimum flow is 0.46 cubic metres per second (16 cu ft/s) in February, and the maximum is 8.63 cubic metres per second (305 cu ft/s) in July.

== Course ==
The source of the Kichi-Kemin is high in the shoots of Trans-Ili Alatau in Kyrgyzstan. For about 10 kilometres (6 mi) the river flows to the north and then to the west along the Kyrgyzstan–Kazakhstan border from an elevation of about 3,500 metres (11,500 ft) to 2,500 metres (8,200 ft). The river passes through urban-type settlement Ak-Tüz and flows to the southwest in a narrow gorge. Further on, it passes through the village of Ilyich and enters the Kichi-Kemin Valley. The Kichi-Kemin River then turns west and passes near the villages of Kichi-Kemin, Boroldoy, and Beysheke. It flows parallel to the Chu at a distance of 3 to 4 kilometres (1.9 to 2.5 mi) and crosses the Kyrgyzstan–Kazakhstan border. In Kazakhstan, it passes near the villages Karasay batyr and Enbek gradually approaching the Chu River, and flowing into it near Chym-Korgon.

== Ecology and environment ==
=== Contamination ===
In 1964, mudflows damaged tailings pond No.2 in the vicinity of the Kichi-Kemin River, and 1.5 million cubic metres (53,000,000 cu ft) of radioactive tailings contaminated the river and lower part of Kichi-Kemin Valley with thorium, lead, copper, zinc, beryllium and other heavy metals.

=== Environmental monitoring ===
The Kyrgyz State Agency on Hydrometeorology runs two water-quality monitoring stations on the Kichi-Kemin River: one of them is 3 kilometres (2 mi) upstream and another is 8 kilometres (5 mi) downstream of Ak-Tuz.
