= Chong-Kemin Nature Park =

National park in Kemin district, Chuy Region, Kyrgyzstan

- Kyrgyz: Чоң-Кемин мамлекеттик жаратылыш паркы
- IUCN category II (national park)
- Location within Kyrgyzstan
- Location: Kemin District, Chüy Region, Kyrgyzstan
- Nearest city: Kemin
- Coordinates: 42°52′N 76°42′E
- Area: 123,564 ha (305,330 acres)
- Established: 1997

Chong-Kemin Nature Park (Kyrgyz: Чоң-Кемин мамлекеттик жаратылыш паркы) is a park in Kemin District of Chüy Region of Kyrgyzstan established in August 1997. The purpose of the park is conservation of the unique nature complexes in Chong-Kemin Valley of the Kemin District and organization of recreation for local and foreign tourists. The area of the park is 123,564 hectares. The park is located in 30 km from the regional center Kemin and in 135 km from Bishkek.

This national park is one of the most picturesque parts of Kyrgyzstan. The 116 km long river Chong-Kemin flows through the park, and there are seven lakes in its basin.

The ecosystem is diverse and is home to rare species, such as the snow leopard, golden eagle and maral (the smallest cervid in Central Asia).
