= Kyzyl-Oktyabr =

Kyzyl-Oktyabr may refer to the following places in the Kyrgyzstan and the Russian Federation:

== Kyrgyzstan ==
- Kyzyl-Oktyabr, Kemin, a village in Kemin District, Chuy Region
- Kyzyl-Oktyabr, Jalal-Abad, a village in Bazar-Korgon District, Jalal-Abad Region
- Kyzyl-Oktyabr, Özgön, a village in Özgön District, Osh Region
- Kyzyl-Oktyabr, Talas, a village in Bakay-Ata District, Talas Region

== Russian Federation ==
- Kyzyl-Oktyabr, a village in Burayevsky District, Bashkortostan, Russian Federation
