= Chong-Kemin =

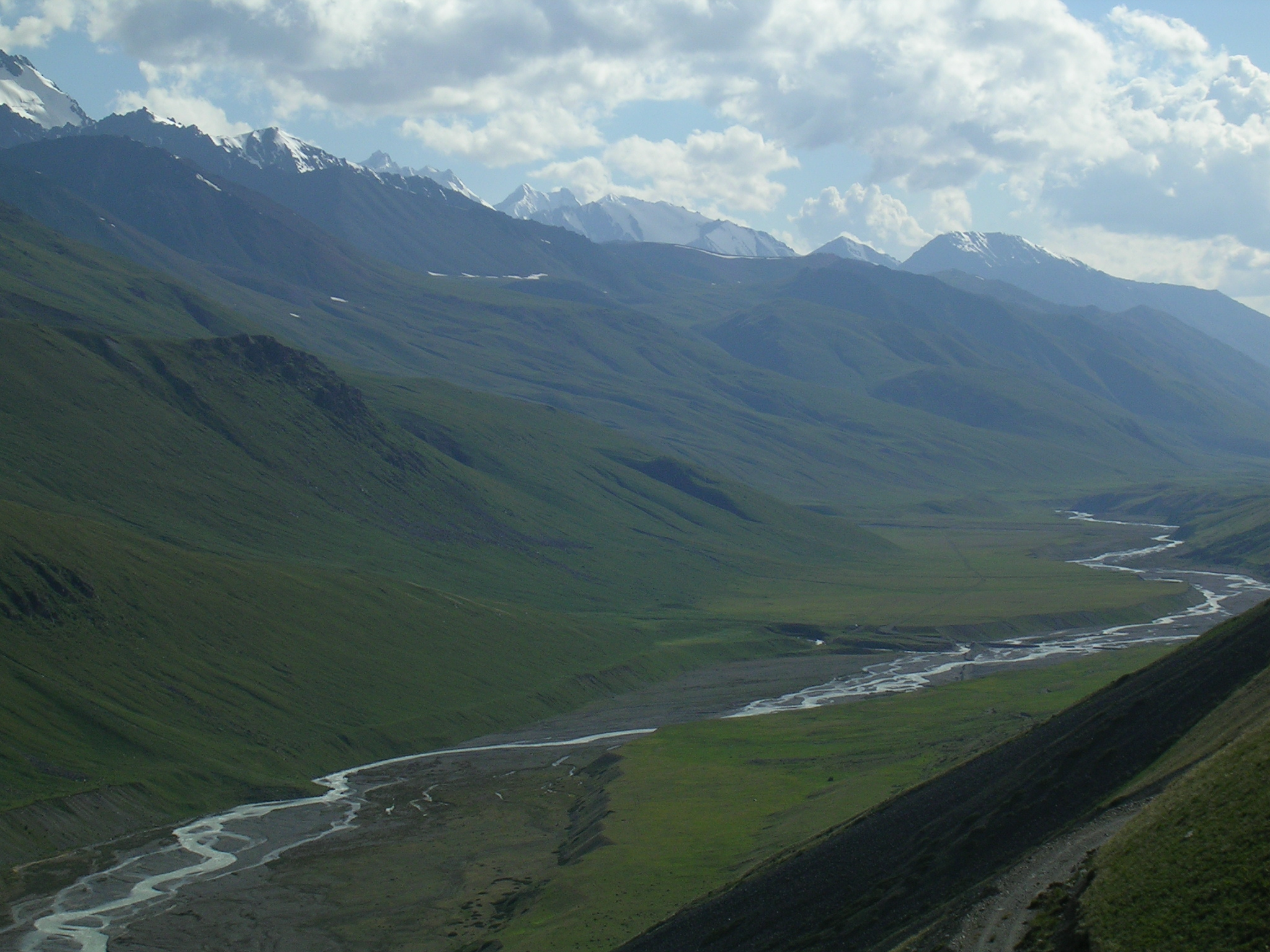
- Chong-Kemin seen from Ozerny Pass.
- Native name: Чоң-Кемин (Kyrgyz)

Location
- Country: Kyrgyzstan
- Region: Chüy Region
- District: Kemin District

Physical characteristics
- Mouth: Chu
  - location: Boom Gorge
  - coordinates: 42°41′28.3″N 75°53′27.9″E
- Length: 116 km (72 mi)
- Basin size: 1,890 km^{2} (730 sq mi)
- Discharge
  - location: mouth
  - average: 21.7 m^{3}/s (770 cu ft/s)
  - minimum: 7.18 m^{3}/s (254 cu ft/s)
  - maximum: 83.7 m^{3}/s (2,960 cu ft/s)

Basin features
- Progression: Chu→ Betpak-Dala desert

The Chong-Kemin (Kyrgyz: Чоң-Кемин) is a river in Kemin District of Chüy Region of Kyrgyzstan. It is a right tributary of the Chu in the Boom Gorge. The river originates from glaciers at the junction of the Küngöy and Trans-Ili Alatau ranges and flows in a latitudinal (east–west) direction through the narrow Chоng Kemin Valley.

It is 116 kilometres (72 mi) long, and has a drainage basin of 1,890 square kilometres (730 sq mi). The river is used for irrigation.

== Hydrology ==
The average annual discharge at the mouth is 21.7 m³/s, with a maximum of 83.7 m³/s and a minimum of 7.18 m³/s. High water occurs in April, with flow decreasing by October; the river freezes in winter.

There are eight lakes in the basin (with a total area of 0.54 km²), the largest being Költör, Chelek, and Zhashyl-Köl.

== Tributaries ==
The river major tributaries include Kalmak-Suu, Ortokayyndy, Dörö, Kashka-Suu, Koy-Suu (left), Tegirmenti, Zhashyl-Köl, Ichke-Suu, Zhangyryk, Buzulgansay, Kaskelen, Kokoluubulak, Almaty, Tuyuk-Almaty, Talgar, and others.

== Settlements ==
Settlements along river banks include Korool-Döbö, Kyzyl-Bayrak, Shabdan, Kayyngdy, Tegirmenti, Kalmak-Ashuu, and Tar-Suu.

== Bibliography ==
- Chuy Oblast Encyclopedia. Kyrgyz Encyclopedia Chief Editorial Board. Bishkek, 1994 (in Kyrgyz and Russian). ISBN 5-89750-083-5
