= Kara-Bulak, Chüy =

Kara-Bulak Кара-Булак
- Location within Kyrgyzstan
- Coordinates: 42°47′56″N 75°44′56″E
- Country: Kyrgyzstan
- Region: Chüy Region
- District: Kemin District
- Established: 1922

Area
  - Total: 1 km^{2} (0.39 sq mi)

Population (2021)
  - Total: 1,087

Kara-Bulak (Kyrgyz: Кара-Булак) is a village in the Kemin District, Chüy Region, Kyrgyzstan. Its population was 1,087 in 2021. It is the center of Kara-Bulak rural community (ayyl aymagy) that also includes the villages Beysheke, Altymysh and Chüy. Among famous people born in Kara-Bulak are academician Arstanbek Altymyshev, composer and singer Abdylas Moldobaev, singer Kaiyrgul Sartbaeva, and composer Nasyr Davlesov.
