= Tört-Kül =

Tört-Kül or Tert-Kul' may refer to the following places:

- Tört-Kül, Issyk Kul, a village in Tong District, Issyk-Kul Region, Kyrgyzstan
- Tört-Kül, Kemin, a village in Kemin District, Chuy Region, Kyrgyzstan
- Tört-Kül, Sokuluk, a village in Sokuluk District, Chuy Region, Kyrgyzstan
- To‘rtko‘l, a town in Karakalpakstan, Uzbekistan
