= Dorozhnoye, Kemin =

Dorozhnoye Дорожное
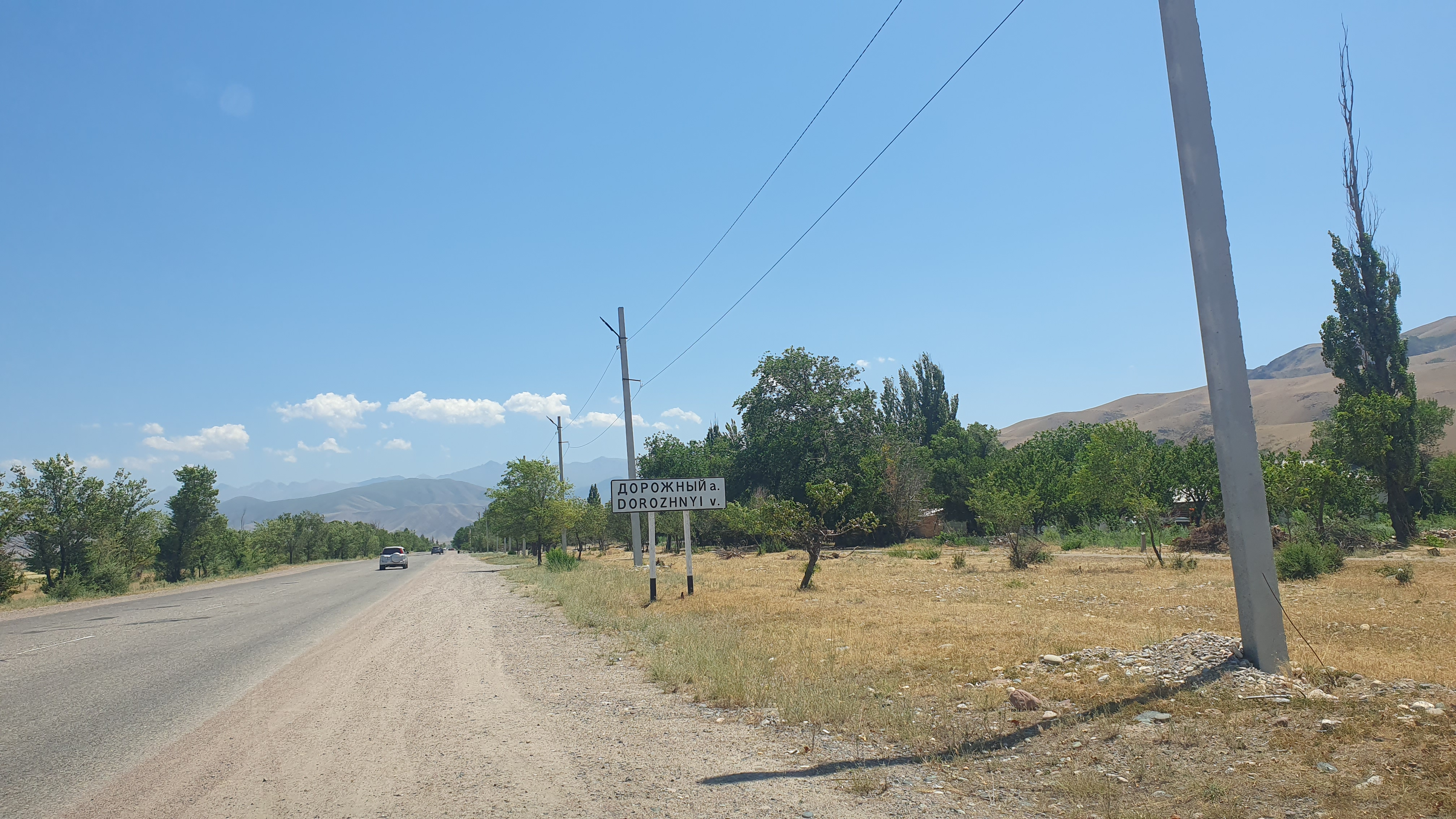

- Location within Kyrgyzstan
- Coordinates: 42°45′43″N 75°47′13″E
- Country: Kyrgyzstan
- Region: Chüy Region
- District: Kemin District
- Elevation: 1,200 m (3,900 ft)

Population (2021)
  - Total: 220
- Time zone: UTC+6

Dorozhnoye (Russian: Дорожное) is a village in the Kemin District of Chüy Region of Kyrgyzstan. Its population was 220 in 2021.
