= Sasyk-Bulak, Kemin =

Sasyk-Bulak Сасык-Булак
- Etymology: Kyrgyz: Сасык-Булак ("stinky spring")
- Location within Kyrgyzstan
- Coordinates: 42°45′53″N 75°45′52″E
- Country: Kyrgyzstan
- Region: Chüy Region
- District: Kemin District
- Elevation: 1,190 m (3,900 ft)

Population (2021)
  - Total: 132
- Time zone: UTC+6

Sasyk-Bulak (Kyrgyz: Сасык-Булак) is a village in the Kemin District of Chüy Region of Kyrgyzstan. Its population was 132 in 2021.
