= Kayyngdy, Kemin =

Kayyngdy Кайыңды
- Location within Kyrgyzstan
- Coordinates: 42°44′38″N 76°09′29″E
- Country: Kyrgyzstan
- Region: Chüy Region
- District: Kemin District

Area
  - Total: 1 km^{2} (0.39 sq mi)
- Elevation: 1,630 m (5,350 ft)

Population (2021)
  - Total: 1,935

Kayyngdy (Kyrgyz: Кайыңды) is a village in the Kemin District of Chüy Region of Kyrgyzstan. Its population was 1,935 in 2021. The village is located on the left bank of the river Chong-Kemin.
