= Jel-Aryk =

Jel-Aryk Жел-Арык
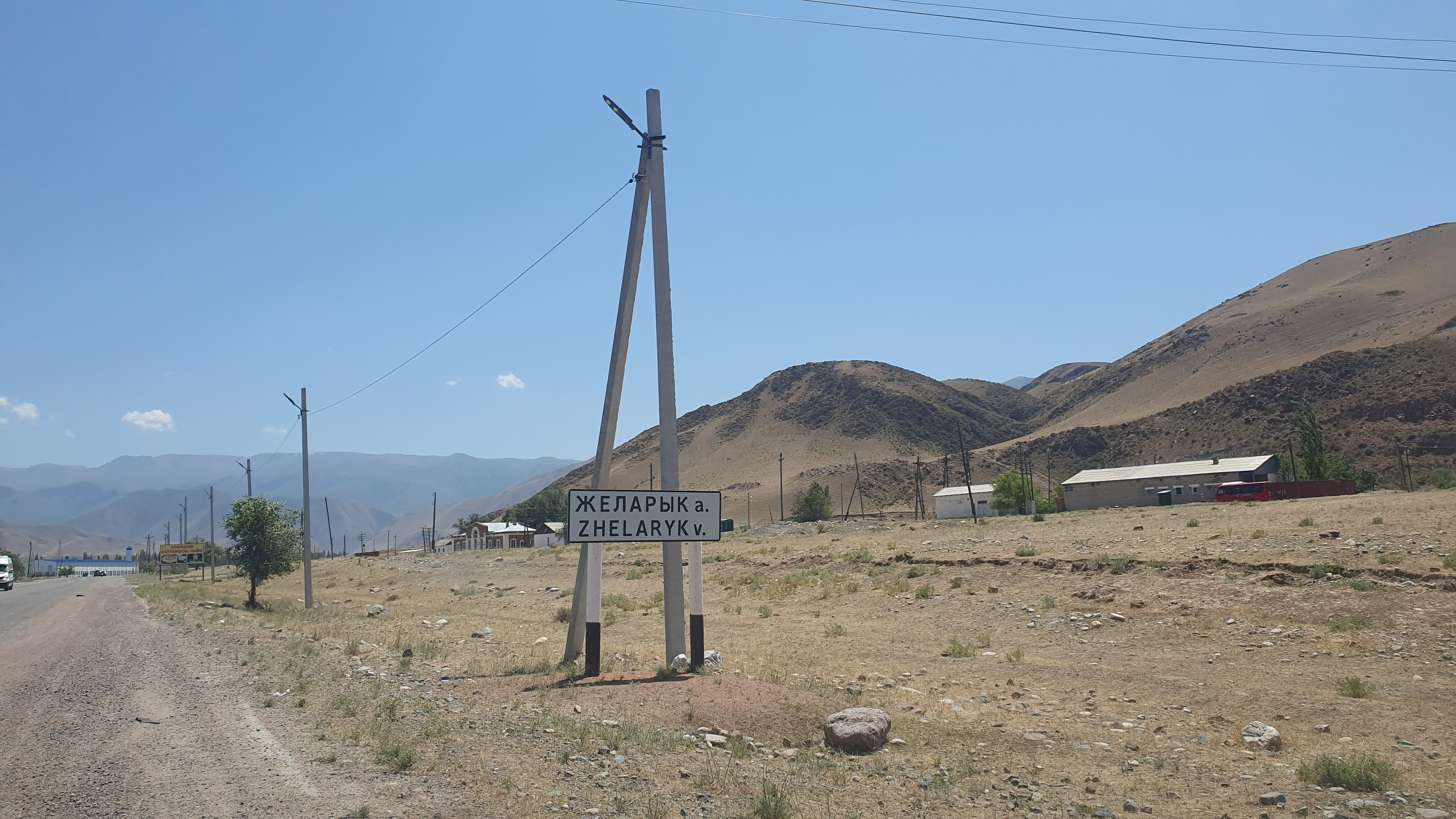

- Location within Kyrgyzstan
- Coordinates: 42°44′53″N 75°49′21″E
- Country: Kyrgyzstan
- Region: Chüy Region
- District: Kemin District
- Elevation: 1,227 m (4,026 ft)

Population (2021)
  - Total: 281
- Time zone: UTC+6

Jel-Aryk (Kyrgyz: Жел-Арык) or (Russian: Джель-Арык) or (Russian: Джиль-Арык) is a village in the Kemin District of Chüy Region of Kyrgyzstan. Its population was 281 in 2021.
