= Samansur =

- Location within Kyrgyzstan
- Coordinates: 42°46′48″N 75°30′36″E
- Country: Kyrgyzstan
- Region: Chüy Region
- District: Kemin District
- Elevation: 971 m (3,186 ft)

Population (2021)
  - Total: 1,015

Samansur is a village in the Chüy Region of Kyrgyzstan. Its population was 1,015 in 2021.
