= Korool-Döbö =

Korool-Döbö Короол-Дөбө
- Location within Kyrgyzstan
- Coordinates: 42°43′55″N 76°07′18″E
- Country: Kyrgyzstan
- Region: Chüy Region
- District: Kemin District

Area
  - Total: 0.8 km^{2} (0.31 sq mi)
- Elevation: 1,595 m (5,233 ft)

Population (2021)
  - Total: 1,452

Korool-Döbö (Kyrgyz: Короол-Дөбө) is a village in the Kemin District of Chüy Region of Kyrgyzstan. Its population was 1,452 in 2021. The village is located on the left bank of the river Chong-Kemin.
