= Boobek =

Boobek Бообек
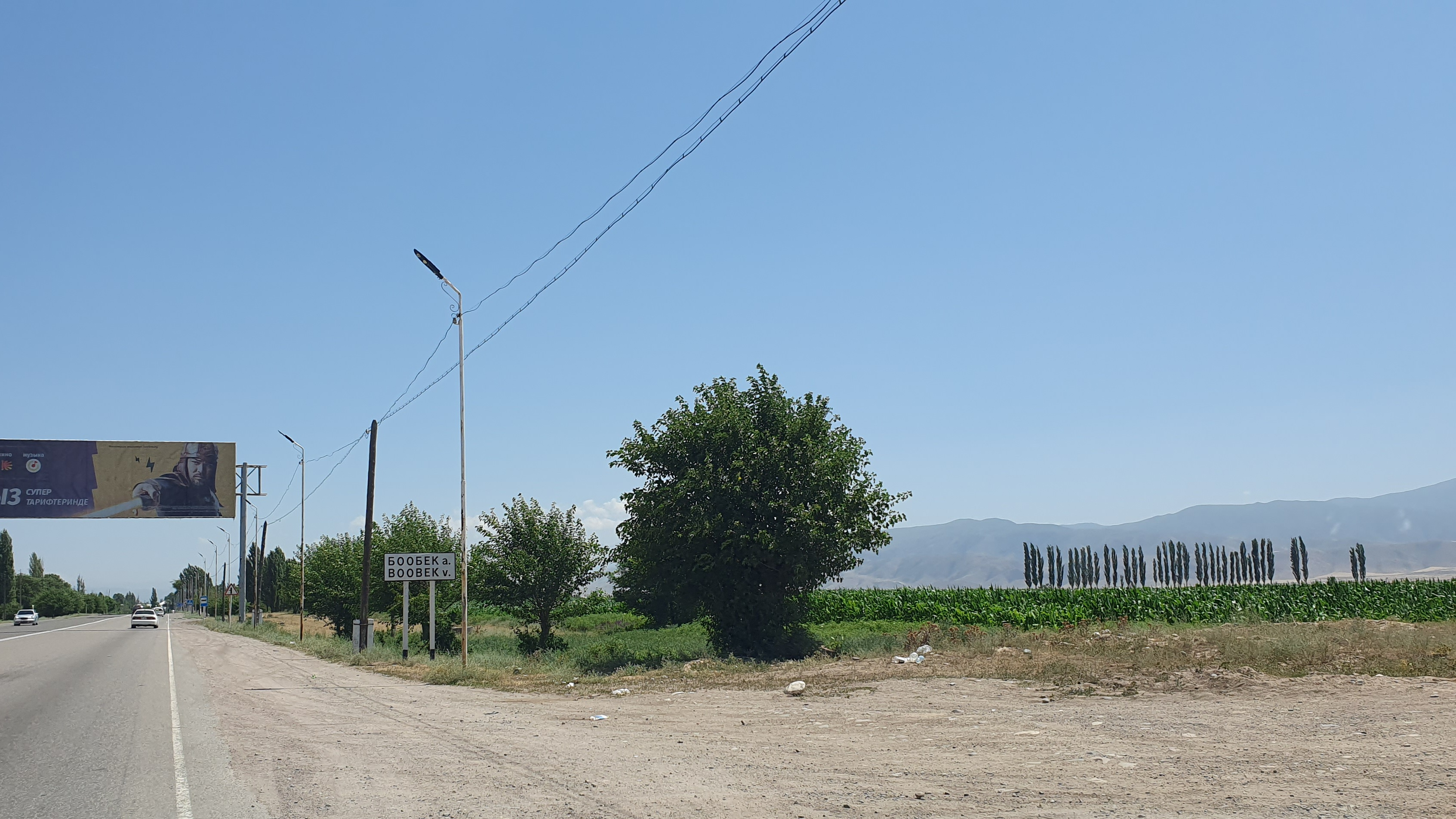

- Location within Kyrgyzstan
- Coordinates: 42°49′20″N 75°33′40″E
- Country: Kyrgyzstan
- Region: Chüy Region
- District: Kemin District
- Elevation: 985 m (3,232 ft)

Population (2021)
  - Total: 398
- Time zone: UTC+6 (KGT)

Boobek (Kyrgyz: Бообек), before 2025 Novomikhaylovka, is a village in the Kemin District of Chüy Region of Kyrgyzstan. Its population was 398 in 2021.
