= Udarnik, Kemin =

Udarnik Ударник
- Location within Kyrgyzstan
- Coordinates: 42°45′02″N 75°38′35″E
- Country: Kyrgyzstan
- Region: Chüy Region
- District: Kemin District
- Elevation: 1,110 m (3,640 ft)

Population (2021)
  - Total: 246
- Time zone: UTC+6

Udarnik (Kyrgyz: Ударник) is a village in the Kemin District of Chüy Region of Kyrgyzstan. Its population was 246 in 2021.
