= Altymysh, Kemin =

Altymysh Алтымыш
- Location within Kyrgyzstan
- Coordinates: 42°46′39″N 75°46′56″E
- Country: Kyrgyzstan
- Region: Chüy Region
- District: Kemin District

Population (2021)
  - Total: 757
- Time zone: UTC+6

Altymysh (Kyrgyz: Алтымыш) is a village in the Kemin District of Chüy Region of Kyrgyzstan. Its population was 757 in 2021.
