= Ak-Beket =

Ak-Beket Ак-Бекет
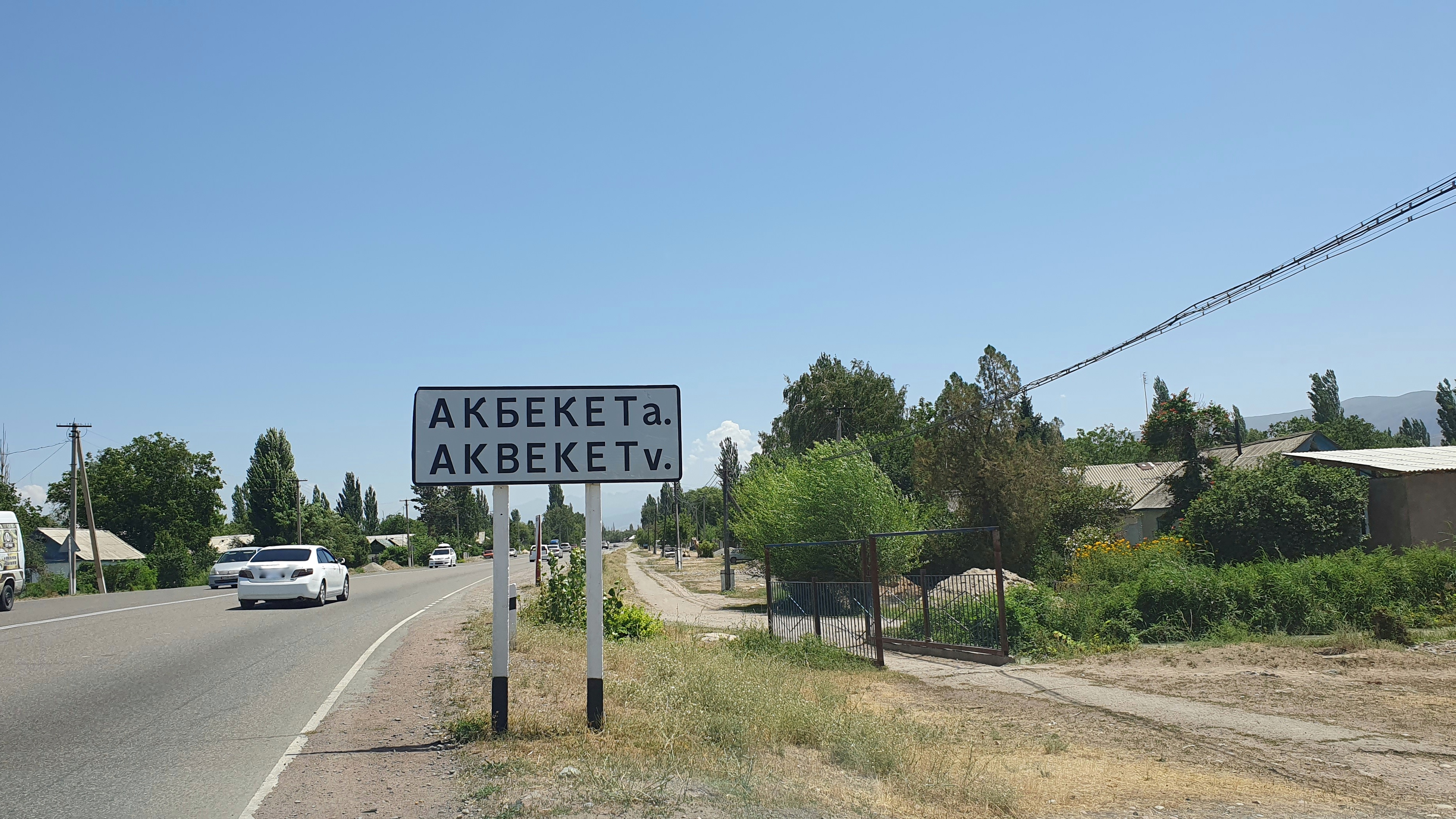

- Location within Kyrgyzstan
- Coordinates: 42°48′20″N 75°38′10″E
- Country: Kyrgyzstan
- Region: Chüy Region
- District: Kemin District
- Elevation: 1,059 m (3,474 ft)

Population (2021)
  - Total: 1,013

Ak-Beket (Kyrgyz: Ак-Бекет, Russian: Белый-Пикет - Bely-Piket) is a village in the Chüy Region of Kyrgyzstan. It lies on the left bank of the river Chu. Its population was 1,013 in 2021.

== Climate ==
Ak-Beket has Mediterranean continental climate (Köppen climate classification: Dsb).

Climate data for Ak-Beket
Month	Jan	Feb	Mar	Apr	May	Jun	Jul	Aug	Sep	Oct	Nov	Dec	Year
Mean daily maximum °C (°F)	−2.5 (27.5)	−1.0 (30.2)	6.0 (42.8)	15.3 (59.5)	20.7 (69.3)	25.2 (77.4)	28.4 (83.1)	27.6 (81.7)	22.7 (72.9)	14.7 (58.5)	5.8 (42.4)	−0.1 (31.8)	13.6 (56.4)
Daily mean °C (°F)	−7.8 (18.0)	−6.3 (20.7)	1.0 (33.8)	9.6 (49.3)	14.8 (58.6)	18.9 (66.0)	21.7 (71.1)	20.6 (69.1)	15.7 (60.3)	8.6 (47.5)	0.7 (33.3)	−4.9 (23.2)	7.7 (45.9)
Mean daily minimum °C (°F)	−13.1 (8.4)	−11.5 (11.3)	−3.9 (25.0)	3.9 (39.0)	9.0 (48.2)	12.7 (54.9)	15.0 (59.0)	13.6 (56.5)	8.7 (47.7)	2.5 (36.5)	−4.3 (24.3)	−9.7 (14.5)	1.9 (35.4)
Average precipitation mm (inches)	16 (0.6)	18 (0.7)	33 (1.3)	53 (2.1)	57 (2.2)	37 (1.5)	22 (0.9)	16 (0.6)	16 (0.6)	30 (1.2)	26 (1.0)	16 (0.6)	340 (13.3)
Source: Climate-Data.org
