= Shabdan =

Shabdan Шабдан
- Location within Kyrgyzstan
- Coordinates: 42°44′00″N 76°04′42″E
- Country: Kyrgyzstan
- Region: Chüy Region
- District: Kemin District
- Elevation: 1,520 m (4,990 ft)

Population (2021)
  - Total: 2,157
- Time zone: UTC+6

Shabdan (former Novorossiyka) is a village in the Kemin District of Chüy Region of Kyrgyzstan. The village is located on the right bank of the river Chong-Kemin. Its population was 2,157 in 2021.
