= Kashkeleng =

Kashkeleng Кашкелең
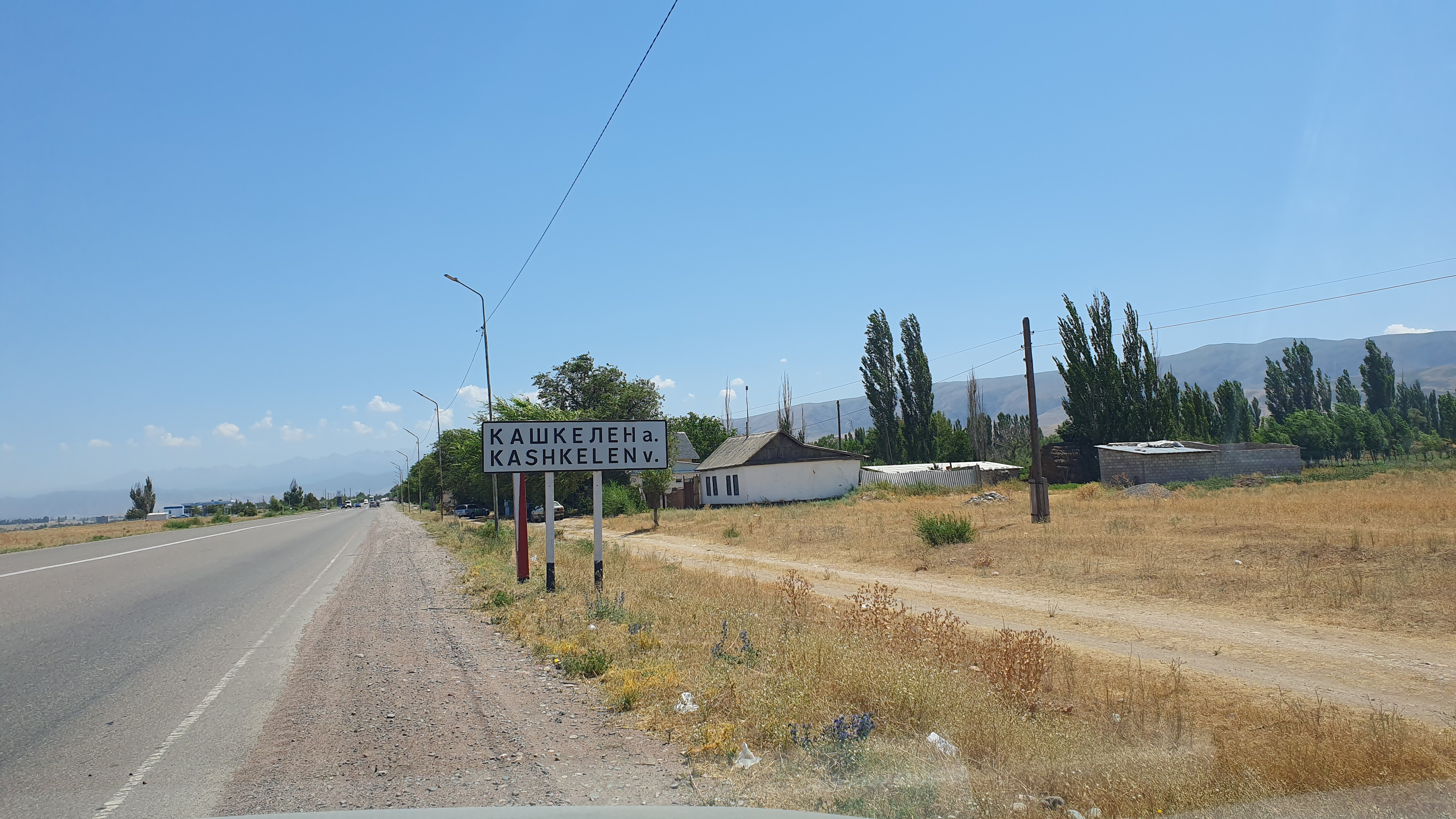

- Location within Kyrgyzstan
- Coordinates: 42°47′38″N 75°40′28″E
- Country: Kyrgyzstan
- Region: Chüy Region
- District: Kemin District
- Elevation: 1,107 m (3,632 ft)

Population (2021)
  - Total: 1,015
- Time zone: UTC+6

Kashkeleng (Russian: Кашкелең) is a village in the Kemin District of Chüy Region of Kyrgyzstan. Its population was 1,015 in 2021.
