= Cholok, Kemin =

Cholok Чолок
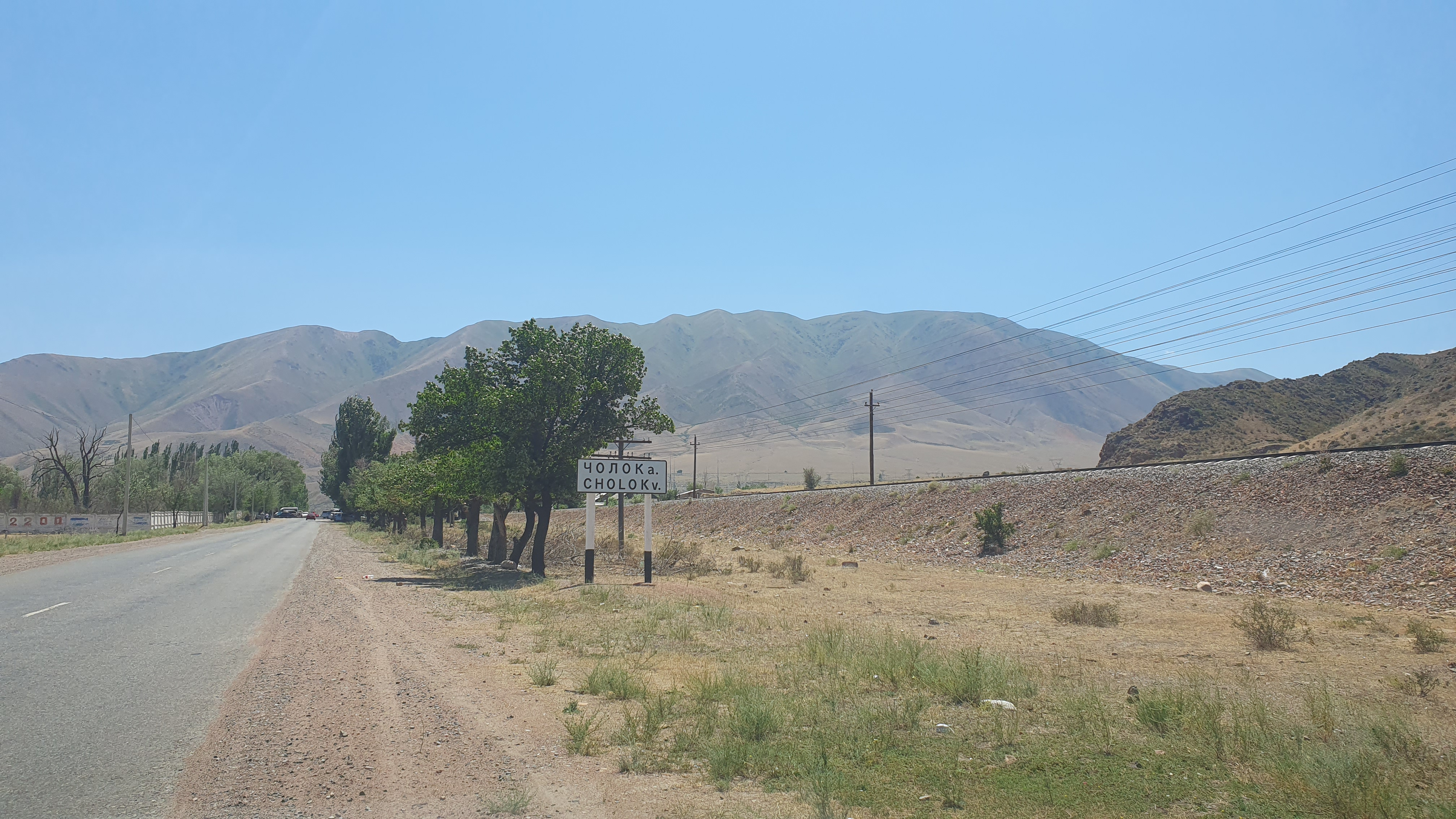

- Location within Kyrgyzstan
- Coordinates: 42°43′25″N 75°50′30″E
- Country: Kyrgyzstan
- Region: Chüy Region
- District: Kemin District
- Elevation: 1,263 m (4,144 ft)

Population (2021)
  - Total: 95
- Time zone: UTC+6

Cholok (Kyrgyz: Чолок) is a village in the Kemin District of Chüy Region of Kyrgyzstan. Its population was 95 in 2021.
