= Kyzyl-Suu (disambiguation) =

Kyzyl-Suu (lit. 'red water' in the Turkic languages) is a village in Issyk-Kul Region, Kyrgyzstan. It may also refer to:

- Kyzyl-Suu, a village in Chüy Region, Kyrgyzstan
- Kyzyl-Suu, the upper course of the river Vakhsh in Kyrgyzstan
- Kyzyl-Suu, the upper course of the river Kashgar in Kyrgyzstan
- Kyzyl-Su, a former name of Türkmenbaşy, Turkmenistan
- Kizilsu Kyrgyz Autonomous Prefecture, Xinjiang, China
- Qizilsu, a river in Tajikistan and tributary of the Panj
