= Kyz-Kyya =

Kyz-Kyya Кыз-Кыя
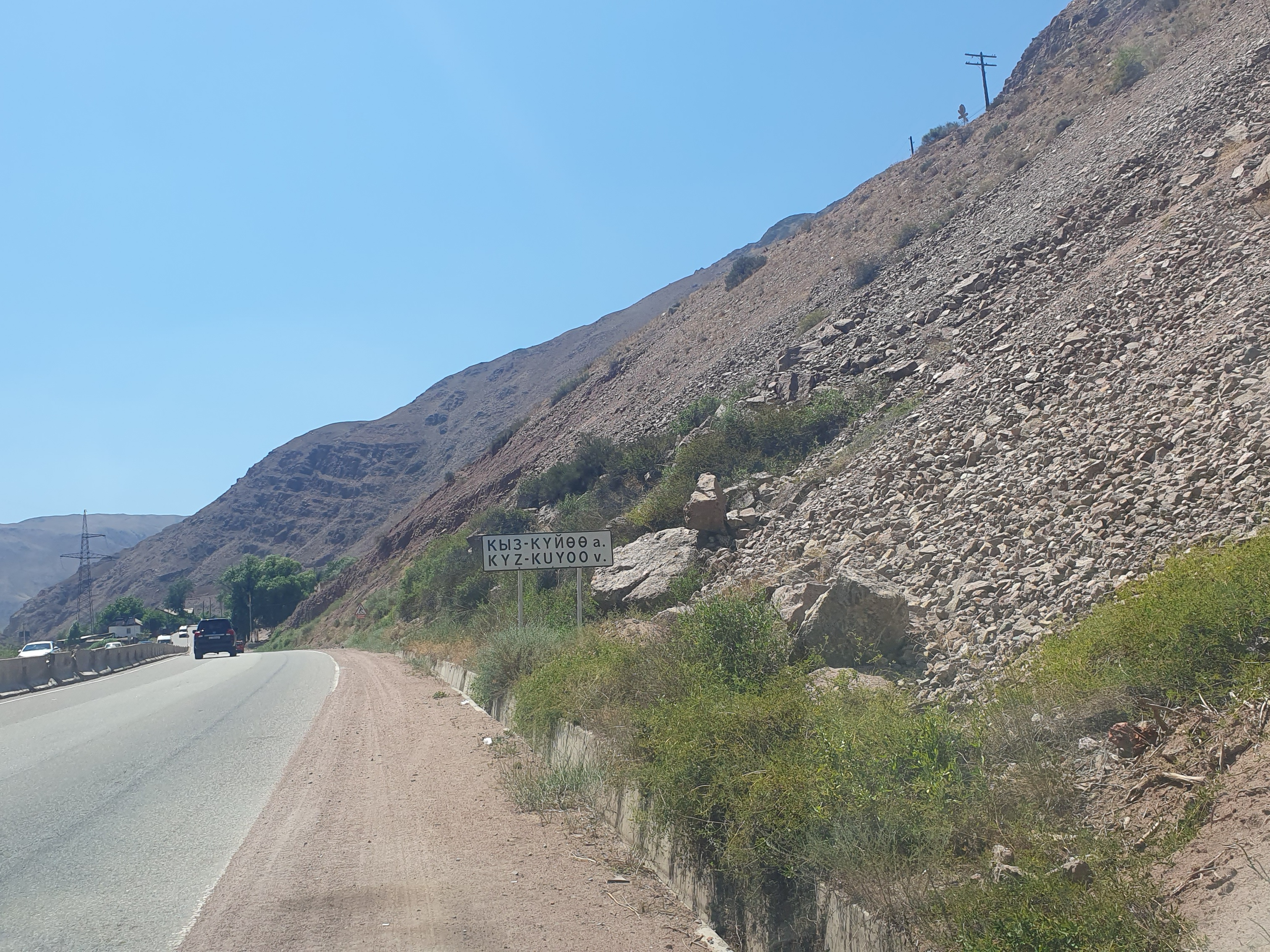

- Location within Kyrgyzstan
- Coordinates: 42°38′40″N 75°51′40″E
- Country: Kyrgyzstan
- Region: Chüy Region
- District: Kemin District
- Elevation: 1,420 m (4,660 ft)

Population (2021)
  - Total: 100
- Time zone: UTC+6

Kyz-Kyya (Kyrgyz: Кыз-Кыя) is a village in the Kemin District of Chüy Region of Kyrgyzstan. Its population was 100 in 2021. It is situated in the Boom Gorge, on the road and the railroad from Bishkek to Balykchy, 7 km downstream from the bridge Krasny Most.
