= Jol-Bulak =

Jol-Bulak Жол-Булак
- Location within Kyrgyzstan
- Coordinates: 42°44′23″N 75°53′55″E
- Country: Kyrgyzstan
- Region: Chüy Region
- District: Kemin District
- Elevation: 1,330 m (4,360 ft)

Population (2021)
  - Total: 1,146

Jol-Bulak, formerly known as Sovetskoye, is a village in the Kemin District of the Chüy Region of Kyrgyzstan. Its population was 1,146 in 2021.
