= Tar-Suu =

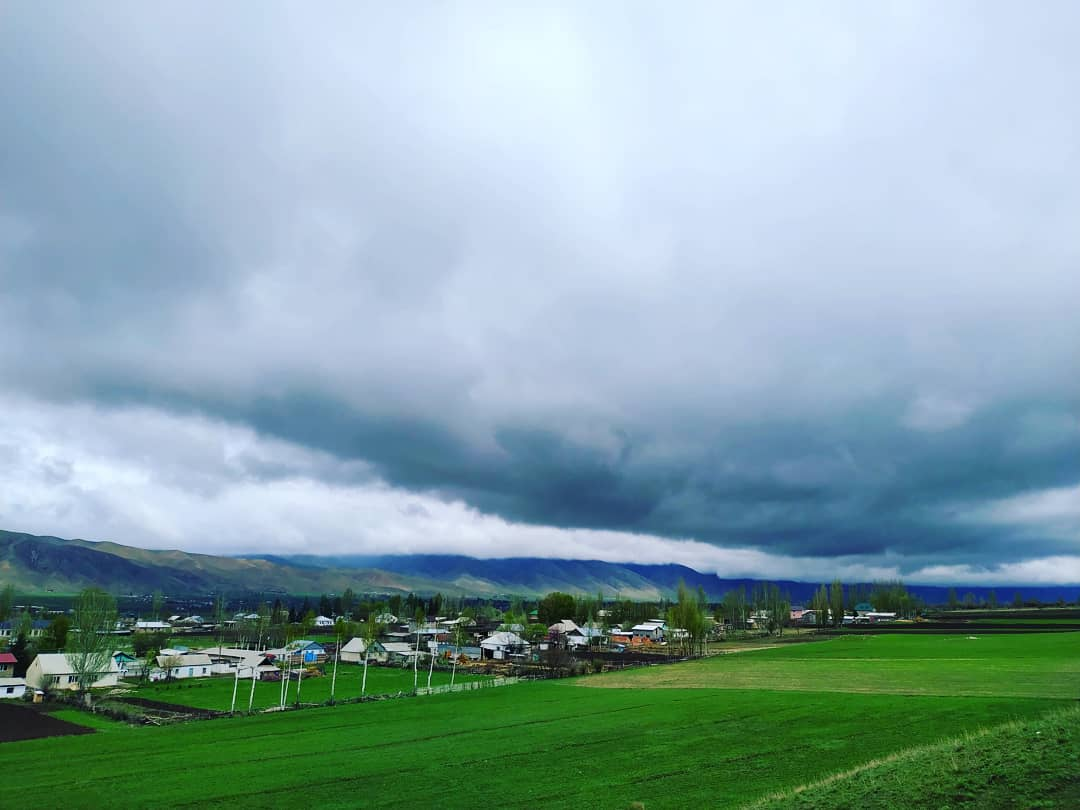

- Location within Kyrgyzstan
- Coordinates: 42°42′0″N 76°3′0″E
- Country: Kyrgyzstan
- Region: Chüy Region
- District: Kemin District
- Elevation: 1,544 m (5,066 ft)

Population (2021)
  - Total: 698

Tar-Suu is a village in the Chüy Region of Kyrgyzstan. Its population was 698 in 2021. Its elevation is 1,544 m (5,066 ft).
