= Jangy-Jol, Kemin =

Jangy-Jol Жаңы-Жол
- Location within Kyrgyzstan
- Coordinates: 42°46′29″N 75°57′16″E
- Country: Kyrgyzstan
- Region: Chüy Region
- District: Kemin District
- Elevation: 1,455 m (4,774 ft)

Population (2021)
  - Total: 304
- Time zone: UTC+6

Jangy-Jol (Kyrgyz: Жаңы-Жол) is a small village in the Kemin District of Chüy Region of Kyrgyzstan. Its population was 304 in 2021.
