= Chüy, Kemin =

Chüy Чүй
- Location within Kyrgyzstan
- Coordinates: 42°46′52″N 75°46′37″E
- Country: Kyrgyzstan
- Region: Chüy Region
- District: Kemin District
- Elevation: 1,188 m (3,898 ft)

Population (2021)
  - Total: 60
- Time zone: UTC+6

Chüy (Kyrgyz: Чүй, Russian: Чуйское - Chuyskoye) is a village in the Kemin District of Chüy Region of Kyrgyzstan. Its population was 60 in 2021.
