= Kyzyl-Oktyabr, Kemin =

Kyzyl-Oktyabr Кызыл-Октябрь
- Etymology: Kyrgyz: Кызыл-Октябрь ("red October")
- Location within Kyrgyzstan
- Coordinates: 42°46′10″N 75°43′57″E
- Country: Kyrgyzstan
- Region: Chüy Region
- District: Kemin District
- Elevation: 1,165 m (3,822 ft)

Population (2021)
  - Total: 1,723
- Time zone: UTC+6

Kyzyl-Oktyabr (Kyrgyz: Кызыл-Октябрь) is a village in the Kemin District of Chüy Region of Kyrgyzstan. Its population was 1,723 in 2021.
