= Tegirmenti =

Tegirmenti Тегирменти
- Location within Kyrgyzstan
- Coordinates: 42°45′36″N 76°9′36″E
- Country: Kyrgyzstan
- Region: Chüy Region
- District: Kemin District
- Elevation: 1,650 m (5,410 ft)

Population (2021)
  - Total: 1,842

Tegirmenti is a village in the Chüy Region of Kyrgyzstan. Its population was 1,842 in 2021.
