= Tört-Kül, Kemin =

Törtkül Төрткүл Vostochniy
- Location within Kyrgyzstan
- Coordinates: 42°42′12″N 76°00′37″E
- Country: Kyrgyzstan
- Region: Chüy Region
- District: Kemin District
- Elevation: 1,440 m (4,720 ft)

Population (2021)
  - Total: 617
- Time zone: UTC+6

Törtkül (Kyrgyz: Төрткүл) (also known as Vostochniy until 1992) is a village in the Kemin District of Chüy Region of Kyrgyzstan. Its population was 617 in 2021.
