= Kalmak-Ashuu =

Kalmak-Ashuu Калмак-Ашуу
- Location within Kyrgyzstan
- Coordinates: 42°43′20″N 76°05′08″E
- Country: Kyrgyzstan
- Region: Chüy Region
- District: Kemin District
- Elevation: 1,530 m (5,020 ft)

Population (2021)
  - Total: 773
- Area code: 03135

Kalmak-Ashuu is a village in the Kemin District of Chüy Region of Kyrgyzstan. Its population was 773 in 2021.
