= Bordu =

Bordu Борду Bordunsky
- Location within Kyrgyzstan
- Coordinates: 42°39′18″N 75°36′0″E
- Country: Kyrgyzstan
- Region: Chüy Region
- District: Kemin District
- Established: 1950

Area
  - Total: 0.05 km^{2} (0.019 sq mi)
- Elevation: 2,100 m (6,900 ft)

Population (2021)
  - Total: 124
- Time zone: UTC+6

Bordu (Kyrgyz: Борду, Russian: Бордунский, romanized: Bordunsky) is an urban-type settlement in the Kemin District of Chüy Region of Kyrgyzstan. Its population was 124 in 2021.

== Population ==
Historical population
Year	Pop.	±% p.a.
1970	1,634	—
1979	1,122	−4.09%
1989	1,008	−1.07%
1999	231	−13.70%
2009	125	−5.96%
2021	124	−0.07%
Note: resident population; Sources:
