= Kyzyl-Bayrak, Chüy =

Kyzyl-Bayrak
- Location within Kyrgyzstan
- Coordinates: 42°42′54″N 76°01′52″E
- Country: Kyrgyzstan
- Region: Chüy Region
- District: Kemin District
- Elevation: 1,545 m (5,069 ft)

Population (2021)
  - Total: 424

Kyzyl-Bayrak (Kyrgyz: Кызыл-Байрак, romanized: Kyzyl-Bayrak) is a village in the Chüy Region of Kyrgyzstan. Its population was 424 in 2021. Its name translates to "red flag." The first president of Kyrgyzstan, Askar Akayev, was born in Kyzyl-Bayrak.
