= Milyanfan =

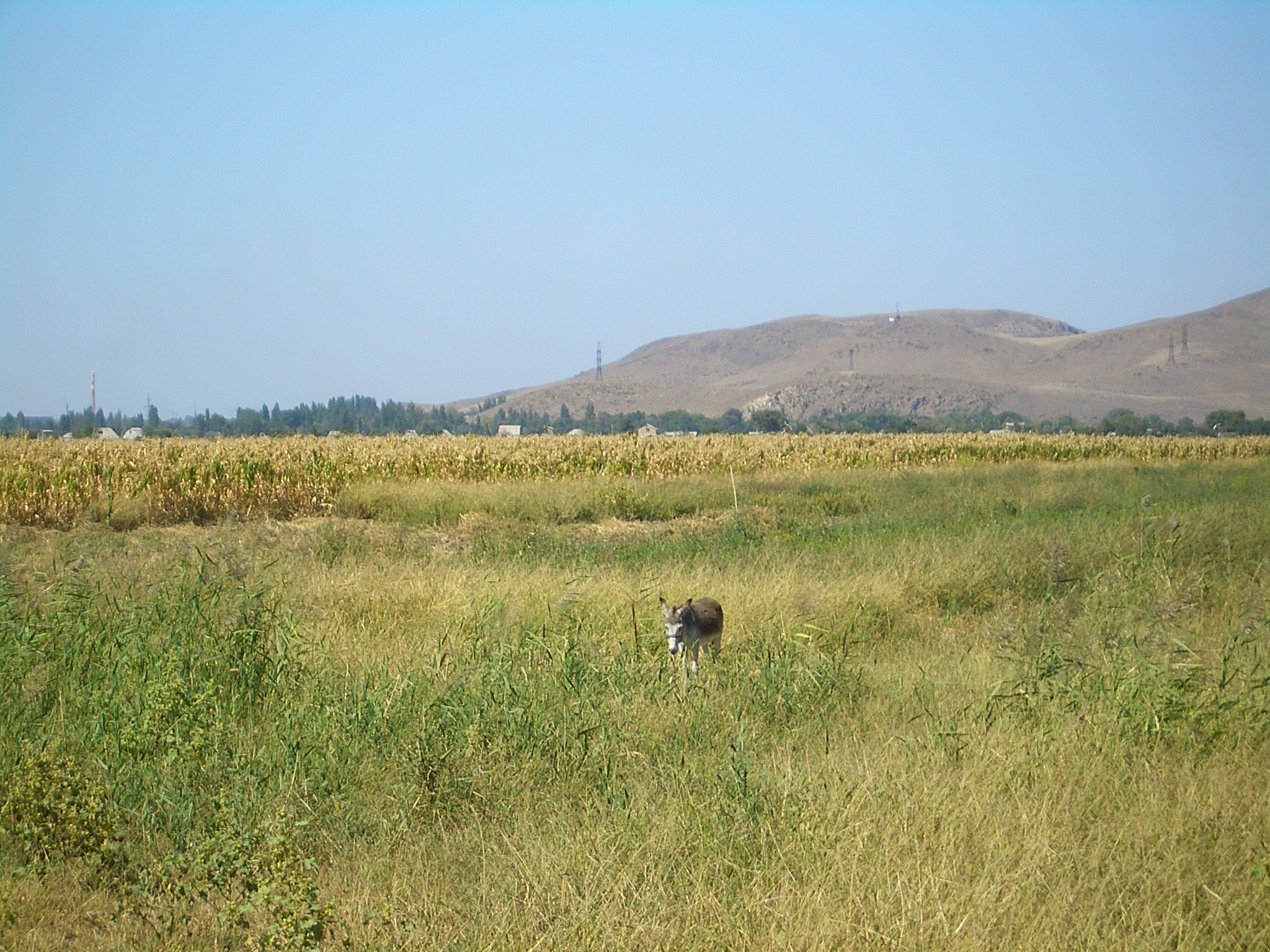
- A view of Milyanfan from the fields west of the village
- Interactive map of Milyanfan
- Location within Kyrgyzstan
- Coordinates: 42°57′36″N 74°48′00″E
- Country: Kyrgyzstan
- Region: Chüy Region
- District: Ysyk-Ata District
- Elevation: 655 m (2,149 ft)

Population (2021)
  - Total: 5,271

Milyanfan (Kyrgyz: Милянфан; Russian: Милянфан, from Dungan: Милёнчуан, romanized: Milionpfan; Hanzi: 米粮川) is a village in the Ysyk-Ata District of the Chüy Region of Kyrgyzstan. Its population was 5,271 in 2021. It is located near the southern bank of the river Chüy, which forms Kyrgyzstan's border with Kazakhstan.

Most of the population is ethnic Dungan.

The village is the birthplace of Sergeant Mansuz Vanakhun (ru) (Russian: Мансуз Ванахун) (1907–1943), who died heroically during World War II and was awarded, posthumously, the honorary title of Hero of Soviet Union. His house is preserved as a museum, and in 2005 his bust was unveiled in the village.

== Population ==
Historical population
Year	Pop.	±% p.a.
2009	4,160	—
2021	5,271	+1.99%
Note: resident population; Sources:
