= Kichi-Kemin =

Kichi-Kemin Кичи-Кемин
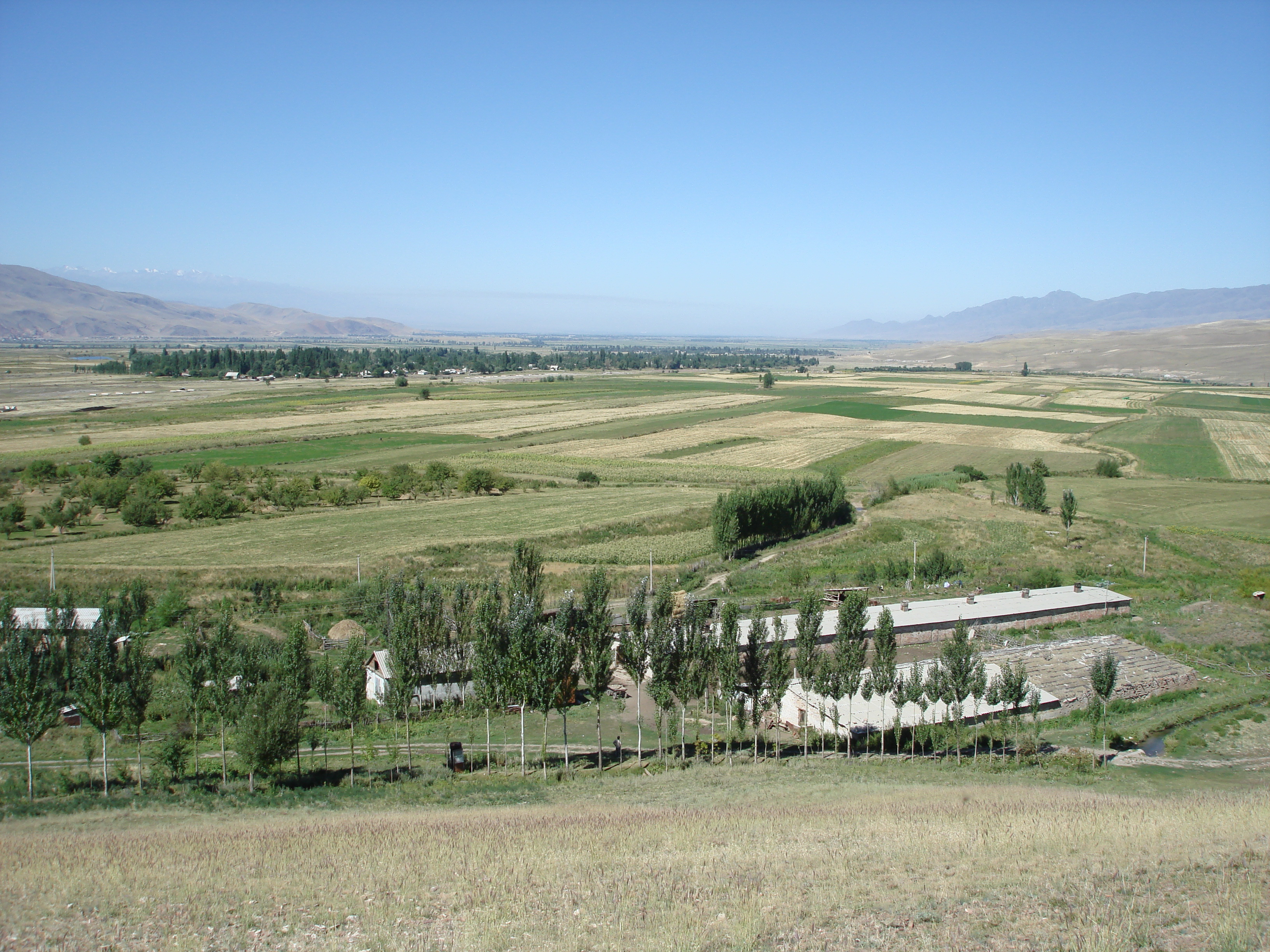

- Location within Kyrgyzstan
- Coordinates: 42°47′07″N 75°54′20″E
- Country: Kyrgyzstan
- Region: Chüy Region
- District: Kemin District

Area
  - Total: 3 km^{2} (1.2 sq mi)
- Elevation: 1,360 m (4,460 ft)

Population (2021)
  - Total: 3,145

Kichi-Kemin is a village in the Kemin District of Chüy Region of Kyrgyzstan. Its population was 3,145 in 2021. It is situated on the left bank of the river Kichi-Kemin.
