= Chym-Korgon =

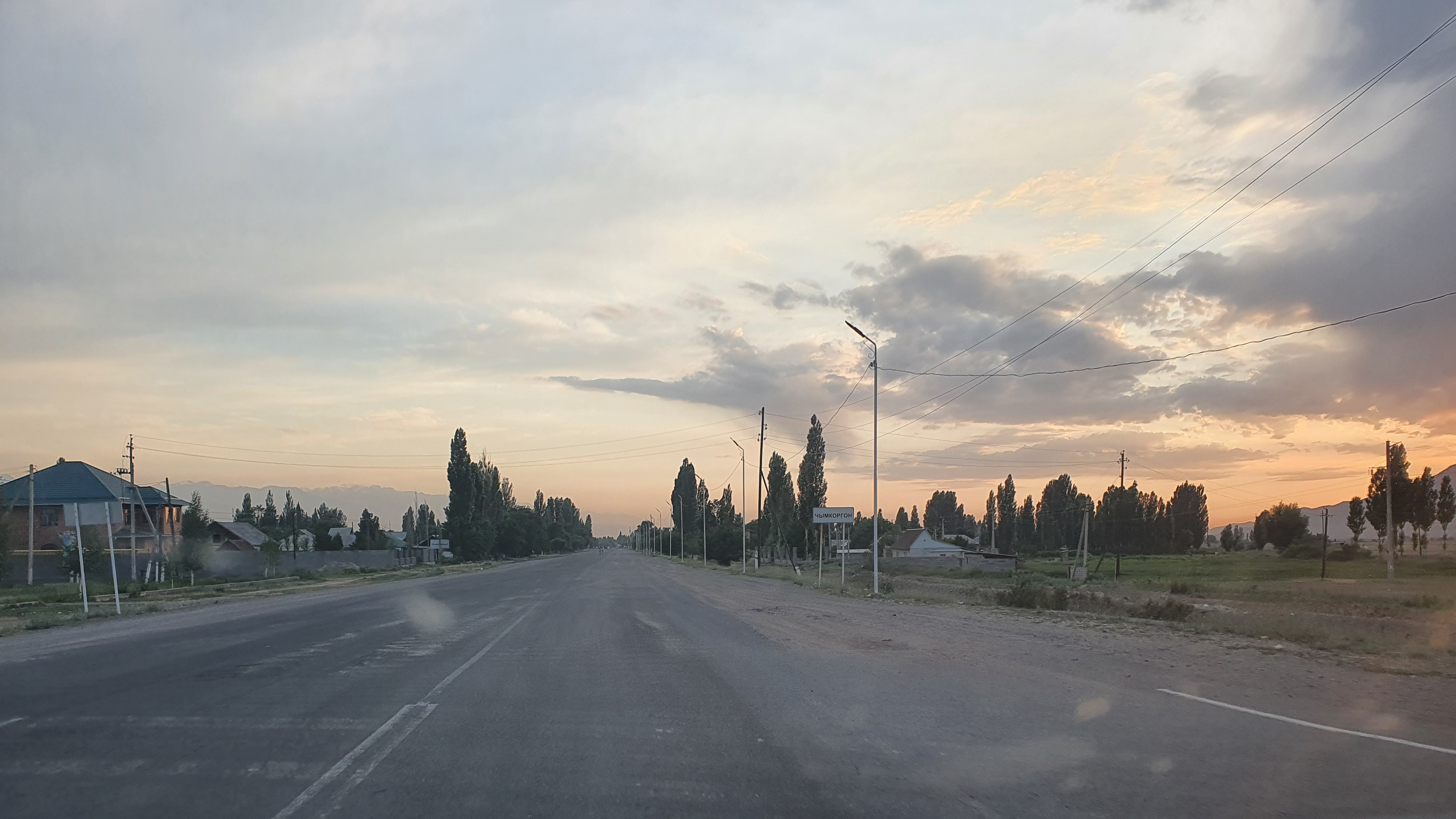

- Location within Kyrgyzstan
- Coordinates: 42°49′20″N 75°32′0″E
- Country: Kyrgyzstan
- Region: Chüy Region
- District: Kemin District
- Elevation: 980 m (3,220 ft)

Population (2021)
  - Total: 4,667

Chym-Korgon is a village in the Chüy Region of Kyrgyzstan. Its population was 4,667 in 2021.

== Climate ==
Chym-Korgon has a humid continental climate (Köppen climate classification: Dsa).

Climate data for Chym-Korgon
| Month | Jan | Feb | Mar | Apr | May | Jun | Jul | Aug | Sep | Oct | Nov | Dec | Year |
|---|---|---|---|---|---|---|---|---|---|---|---|---|---|
| Mean daily maximum °C (°F) | −1.7 (28.9) | −0.1 (31.8) | 6.8 (44.2) | 15.9 (60.6) | 21.4 (70.5) | 25.9 (78.6) | 29.1 (84.4) | 28.2 (82.8) | 23.2 (73.8) | 15.3 (59.5) | 6.4 (43.5) | 0.6 (33.1) | 14.3 (57.6) |
| Daily mean °C (°F) | −7.0 (19.4) | −5.4 (22.3) | 1.8 (35.2) | 10.1 (50.2) | 15.4 (59.7) | 19.6 (67.3) | 22.3 (72.1) | 21.1 (70.0) | 16.1 (61.0) | 9.1 (48.4) | 1.3 (34.3) | −4.3 (24.3) | 8.3 (47.0) |
| Mean daily minimum °C (°F) | −12.3 (9.9) | −10.7 (12.7) | −3.2 (26.2) | 4.4 (39.9) | 9.5 (49.1) | 13.3 (55.9) | 15.5 (59.9) | 14.1 (57.4) | 9.1 (48.4) | 3.0 (37.4) | −3.8 (25.2) | −9.1 (15.6) | 2.5 (36.5) |
| Average precipitation mm (inches) | 19 (0.7) | 21 (0.8) | 39 (1.5) | 60 (2.4) | 62 (2.4) | 37 (1.5) | 21 (0.8) | 14 (0.6) | 17 (0.7) | 33 (1.3) | 31 (1.2) | 19 (0.7) | 373 (14.6) |
Source: Climate-Data.org
