= Kyzyl-Suu, Kemin =

Kyzyl-Suu Кызыл-Суу
- Location within Kyrgyzstan
- Coordinates: 42°42′37″N 75°28′35″E
- Country: Kyrgyzstan
- Region: Chüy Region
- District: Kemin District
- Elevation: 1,220 m (4,000 ft)

Population (2021)
  - Total: 1,478
- Time zone: UTC+6

Kyzyl-Suu (Kyrgyz: Кызыл-Суу) is a village in the Kemin District of Chüy Region of Kyrgyzstan. Its population was 1,478 in 2021.

== Climate ==
Climate data for Kyzyl-Suu (1991–2020)
Month	Jan	Feb	Mar	Apr	May	Jun	Jul	Aug	Sep	Oct	Nov	Dec	Year
Daily mean °C (°F)	−4.3 (24.3)	−3.1 (26.4)	2.3 (36.1)	8.3 (46.9)	12.2 (54.0)	15.9 (60.6)	18.0 (64.4)	17.2 (63.0)	13.9 (57.0)	8.0 (46.4)	2.2 (36.0)	−2.3 (27.9)	7.4 (45.3)
Source: NOAA
