= Kyzyl-Oktyabr, Burayevsky District, Republic of Bashkortostan =

Kyzyl-Oktyabr Кызыл-Октябрь
- Village
- Location within Bashkortostan Location within Russia
- Coordinates: 55°55′N 55°10′E
- Country: Russia
- Region: Bashkortostan
- District: Burayevsky District
- Time zone: UTC+5:00

Kyzyl-Oktyabr (Russian: Кызыл-Октябрь; Bashkir: Ҡыҙыл Октябрь, Qıźıl Oktyabr) is a rural locality (a village) in Kushmanakovsky Selsoviet, Burayevsky District, Bashkortostan, Russia. The population was 6 as of 2010. There is 1 street.

== Geography ==
Kyzyl-Oktyabr is located 18 km west of Burayevo (the district's administrative centre) by road. Karatamak is the nearest rural locality.
