= Kemin =

Kemin Кемин
- Location in Kyrgyzstan
- Coordinates: 42°47′10″N 75°41′30″E
- Country: Kyrgyzstan
- Region: Chüy Region
- District: Kemin District
- Established: 1912
- City status: 2012
- Elevation: 1,123 m (3,684 ft)

Population (2021)
  - Total: 10,354

Kemin (before 1992: Bystrovka) is a city in northeastern Kyrgyzstan, the administrative headquarters of Kemin District in Chüy Region. Its population was 10,354 in 2021. It is located about 95 km eastward of Bishkek on the left bank of the river Chüy in the Chüy Valley. Kemin was established in 1912. Kemin received city right in 2012.

== Population ==
Historical population
Year	Pop.	±% p.a.
1970	9,657	—
1979	11,706	+2.16%
1989	13,651	+1.55%
1999	11,401	−1.78%
2009	8,169	−3.28%
2021	10,354	+1.99%
Note: resident population; Sources:

== Notable people ==
- Askar Akayevich Akayev (born 10 November 1944), first President of the Kyrgyz Republic,
- Bolot Beyshenaliyev (25 June 1937 - 18 November 2002), Kyrgyz cinematographer, film and theater actor.
