= Ilyich, Kyrgyzstan =

Ilyich Ильич
- Location within Kyrgyzstan
- Coordinates: 42°47′07″N 76°00′00″E
- Country: Kyrgyzstan
- Region: Chüy Region
- District: Kemin District
- Elevation: 1,553 m (5,095 ft)

Population (2021)
  - Total: 1,454
- Time zone: UTC+6

Ilyich (Kyrgyz: Ильич, Russian: Ильичевское, romanized: Ilyichevskoye) is a village in the Kemin District of Chüy Region of Kyrgyzstan. Its population was 1,454 in 2021.
