= Boroldoy =

Boroldoy Боролдой
- Location within Kyrgyzstan
- Coordinates: 42°47′24″N 75°51′0″E
- Country: Kyrgyzstan
- Region: Chüy Region
- District: Kemin

Area
  - Total: 1.4 km^{2} (0.54 sq mi)
- Elevation: 1,276 m (4,186 ft)

Population (2021)
  - Total: 2,181

Boroldoy (Kyrgyz: Боролдой) is a village in the Kemin District, Chüy Region, Kyrgyzstan. Its population was 2,181 in 2021. It is the center of Boroldoy rural community (ayyl aymagy).
