= Ak-Tüz =

Ak-Tüz Ак-Түз
- Location within Kyrgyzstan
- Coordinates: 42°52′46″N 76°08′03″E
- Country: Kyrgyzstan
- Region: Chüy Region
- District: Kemin District
- Established: 1938
- Elevation: 2,205 m (7,234 ft)

Population (2021)
  - Total: 827
- Time zone: UTC+6

Ak-Tüz is a village in the Kemin District of Chüy Region of Kyrgyzstan. Its population was 827 in 2021. Until 2012 it was an urban-type settlement.

== Population ==
Historical population
Year	Pop.	±% p.a.
1970	3,250	—
1979	2,497	−2.89%
1989	2,449	−0.19%
1999	933	−9.20%
2009	580	−4.64%
2021	827	+3.00%
Note: resident population; Sources:
