= Beysheke, Kemin =

Beysheke Бейшеке
- Location within Kyrgyzstan
- Coordinates: 42°48′57″N 75°48′55″E
- Country: Kyrgyzstan
- Region: Chüy Region
- District: Kemin District
- Elevation: 1,223 m (4,012 ft)

Population (2021)
  - Total: 1,268

Beysheke (Kyrgyz: Бейшеке) is a village in the Kemin District of Chüy Region of Kyrgyzstan. Its population was 1,268 in 2021.
