= Kemin District =

Coordinates: 42°47′N 75°41′E

Kemin District Кемин району
- District
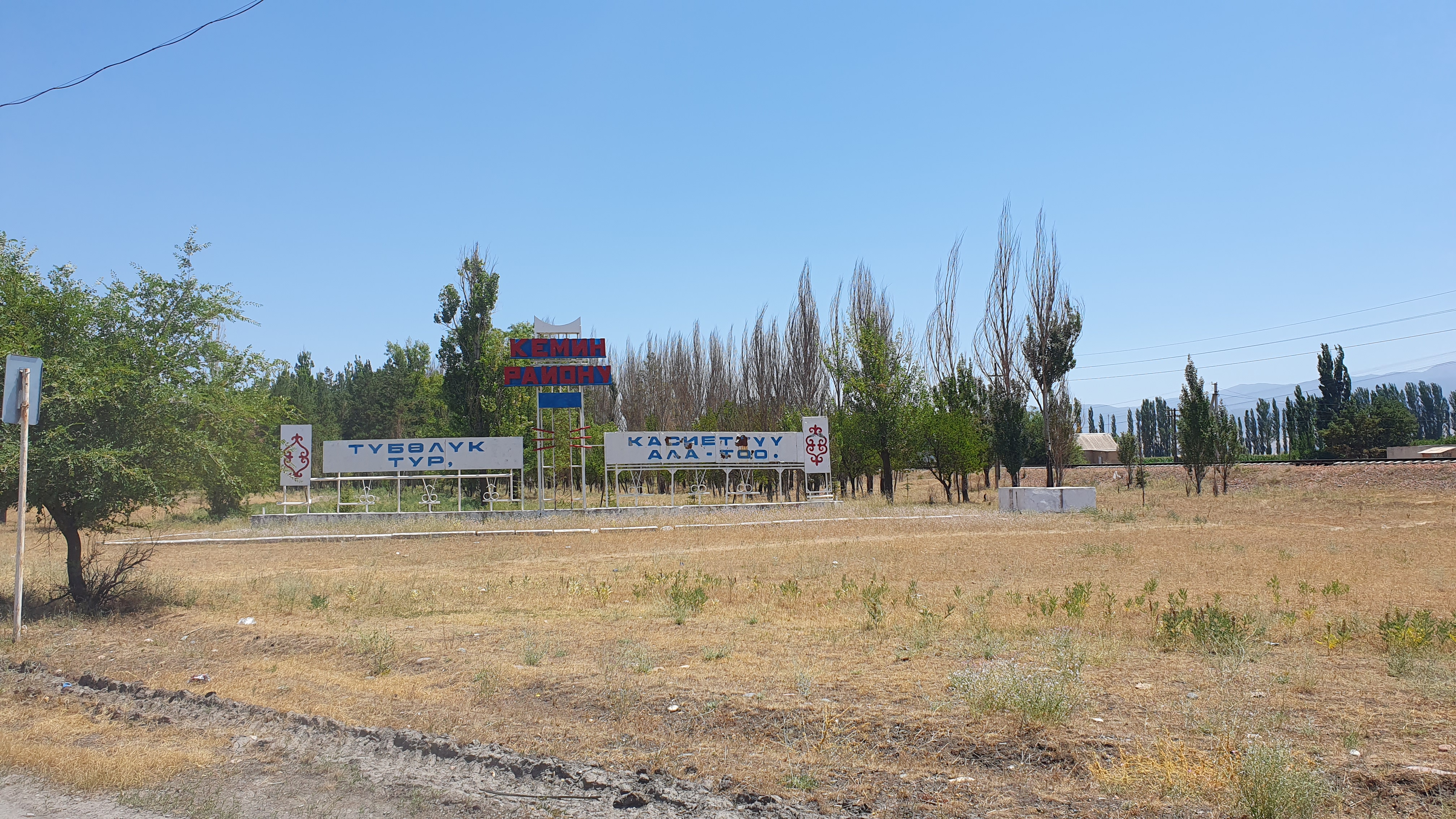

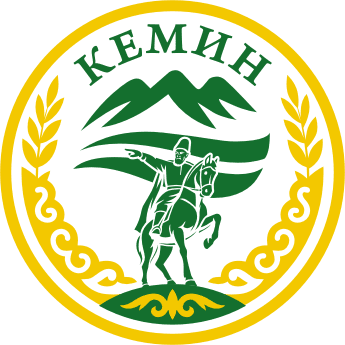
- Coat of arms

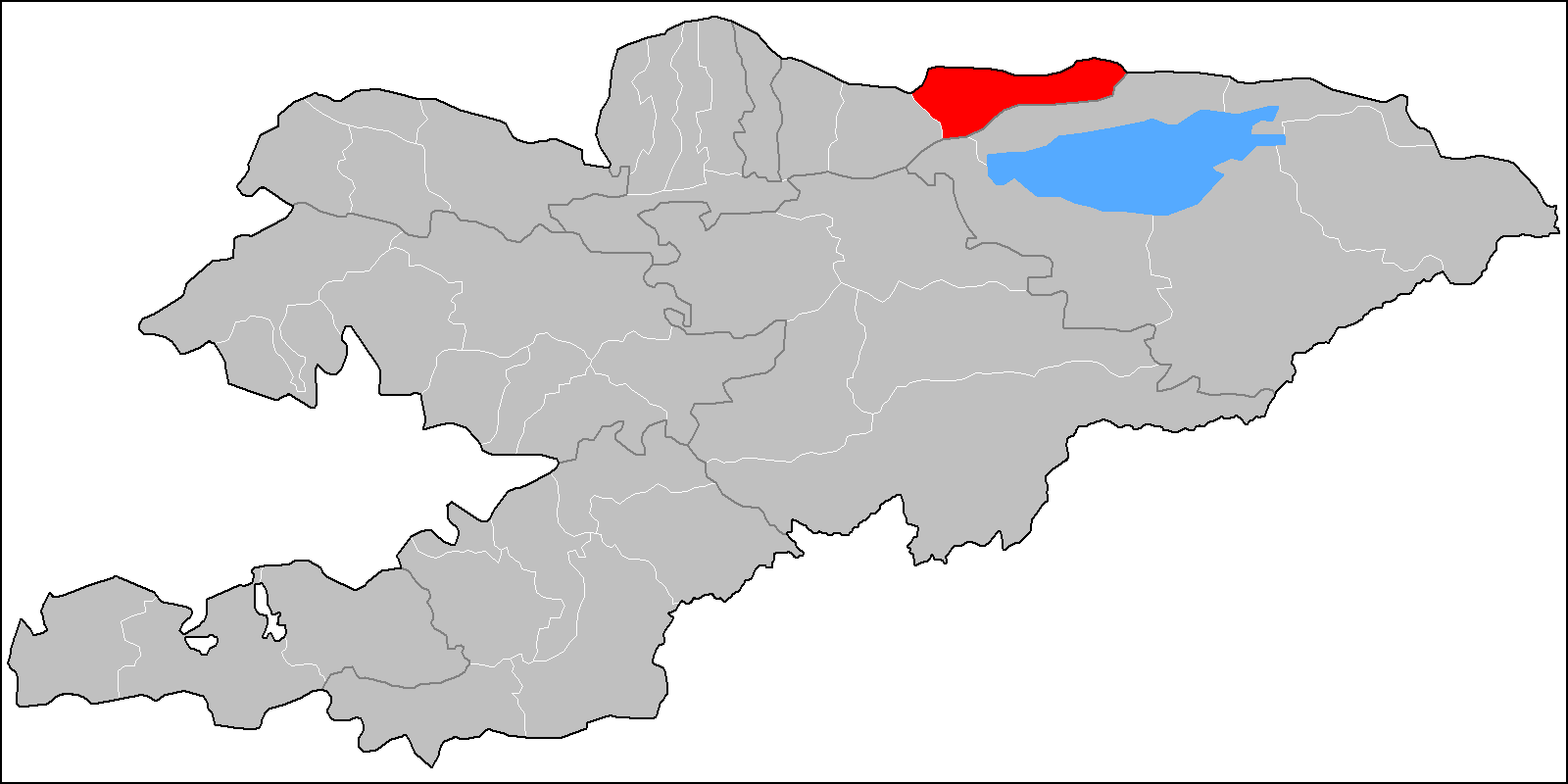
- Country: Kyrgyzstan
- Region: Chüy Region
- Kemin District: 1936
- Capital: Kemin

Area
  - Total: 3,533 km^{2} (1,364 sq mi)

Population (2021)
  - Total: 48,360
  - Density: 13.69/km^{2} (35.45/sq mi)
- Time zone: UTC+6

Kemin District (Kyrgyz: Кемин району, romanized: Kemin raionu) is the northeastern panhandle district of the Chüy Region in northern Kyrgyzstan. Its area is 3,533 square kilometres (1,364 sq mi), making it the largest district of the Chüy Region, and its resident population was 48,360 in 2021. Its administrative headquarters is at Kemin. The district is located in the Chong-Kemin Valley, the Kichi-Kemin Valley and the eastern part of the Chüy Valley. It borders with Kazakhstan in the north, Chüy District in the west, and Issyk-Kul Region in the south and east.

== Topography ==
The western part of the district is flat with altitudes 1000–1600 msl, and the eastern part is mountainous.

== Climate ==
The climate is sharply continental with cold winters and cool summers; January temperatures averaging −5 °C to −10 °C, July +17 °C to +18 °C. Average precipitation is from 200 mm in flatlands, and up to 600–700 mm in mountains.

== Hydrology ==
Large rivers in the district include the Chu, Chong-Kemin, Kichi-Kemin and others. There are also several small lakes: Chong-Kelter, Chelek and Kosh-Kel

== Demographics ==
The population of Kemin District, according to the Population and Housing Census of 2009, was 44,118 which is second lowest among districts of the Chüy Region. Average density is 12 people per square kilometer. Some 36% of population lives in urban areas, and 64% in rural ones.

Historical populations in Kemin District
| Year | Pop. | ±% p.a. |
|---|---|---|
| 1970 | 54,196 | — |
| 1979 | 56,917 | +0.55% |
| 1989 | 61,906 | +0.84% |
| 1999 | 53,144 | −1.51% |
| 2009 | 44,118 | −1.84% |
| 2021 | 48,360 | +0.77% |
Note: resident population; Sources:

=== Ethnic composition ===
According to the 2009 Census, the ethnic composition (de jure population) of the Kemin District was:

| Ethnic group | Population | Proportion of Kemin District population |
|---|---|---|
| Kyrgyzs | 37,724 | 85.5% |
| Russians | 4,785 | 10.8% |
| Kazakhs | 550 | 1.2% |
| Dungans | 170 | 0.4% |
| Ukrainians | 170 | 0.4% |
| Tatars | 157 | 0.4% |
| Uzbeks | 133 | 0.3% |
| other groups | 429 | 1% |

== Populated places ==
In total, Kemin District include 2 towns, 1 urban-type settlement and 34 settlements in 11 rural communities (ayyl aymagy). Each rural community can consist of one or several villages. The towns, urban-type settlements, rural communities and villages in the Kemin District are:

1. town Orlovka
2. town Kemin
3. urban-type settlement Bordu
4. Ak-Tüz (seat: Ak-Tüz)
5. Almaluu (seat: Kyzyl-Suu; incl. Almaluu and Bordu)
6. Boroldoy (seat: Boroldoy)
7. Chong-Kemin (seat: Shabdan; incl. Kalmak-Ashuu, Kyzyl-Bayrak, Tar-Suu and Törtkül)
8. Chym-Korgon (seat: Chym-Korgon; incl. Novomikhaylovka and Samansur)
9. Duysheev (seat: Kichi-Kemin)
10. Ilyich (seat: Ilyich; incl. Jangy-Jol and Jol-Bulak (Sovetskoye))
11. Jangy-Alysh (seat: Jangy-Alysh)
12. Kara-Bulak (seat: Kara-Bulak; incl. Altymysh, Beysheke and Chüy)
13. Kök-Oyrok (seat: Kayyngdy; incl. Korool-Döbö and Tegirmenti)
14. Kyzyl-Oktyabr (seat: Kyzyl-Oktyabr; incl. Ak-Beket, Jel-Aryk, Dorozhnoye, Kashkeleng, Kyz-Kyya, Sasyk-Bulak, Udarnik and Cholok)
Settlements of the Kemin District
