= Chüy Region =

Region of Kyrgyzstan

Chüy Region: Чүй облусу (Kyrgyz); Чуйская область (Russian)
- Region
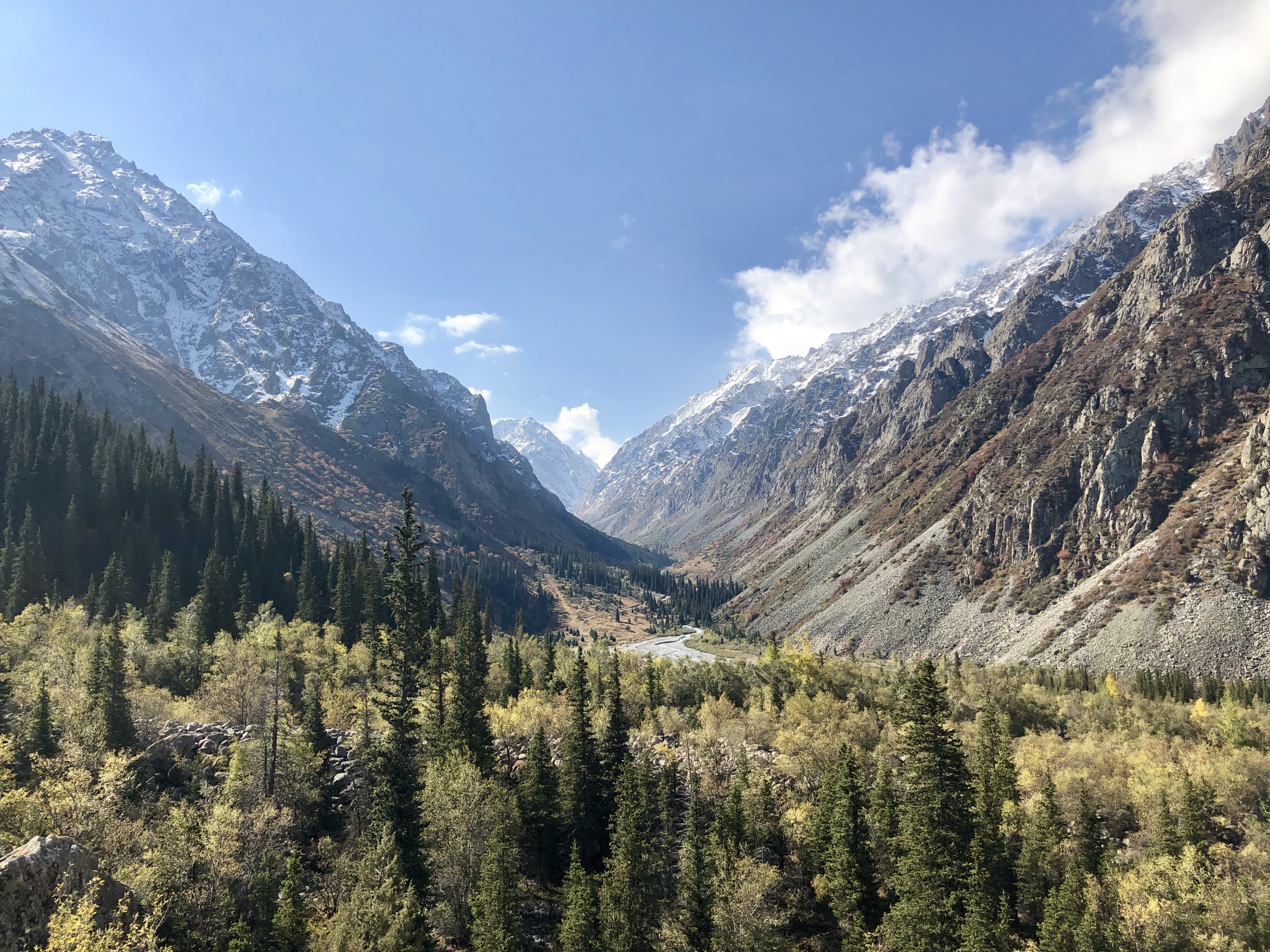
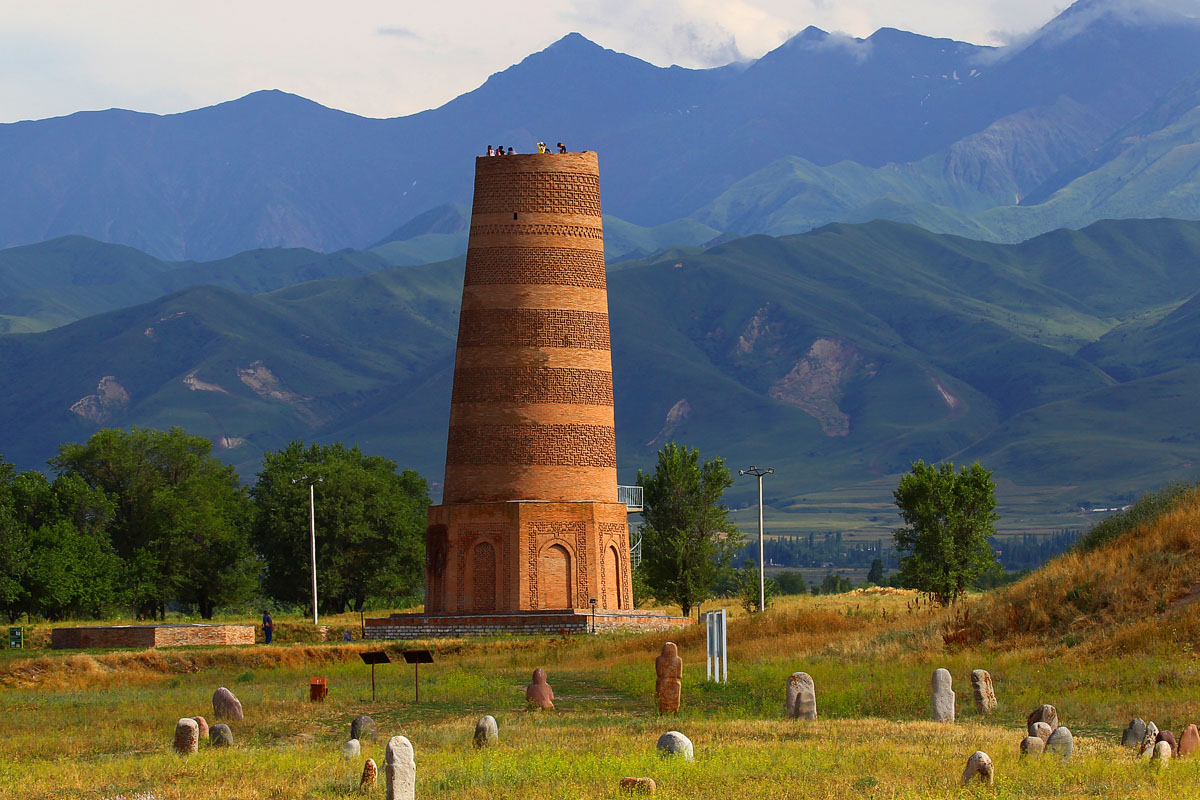
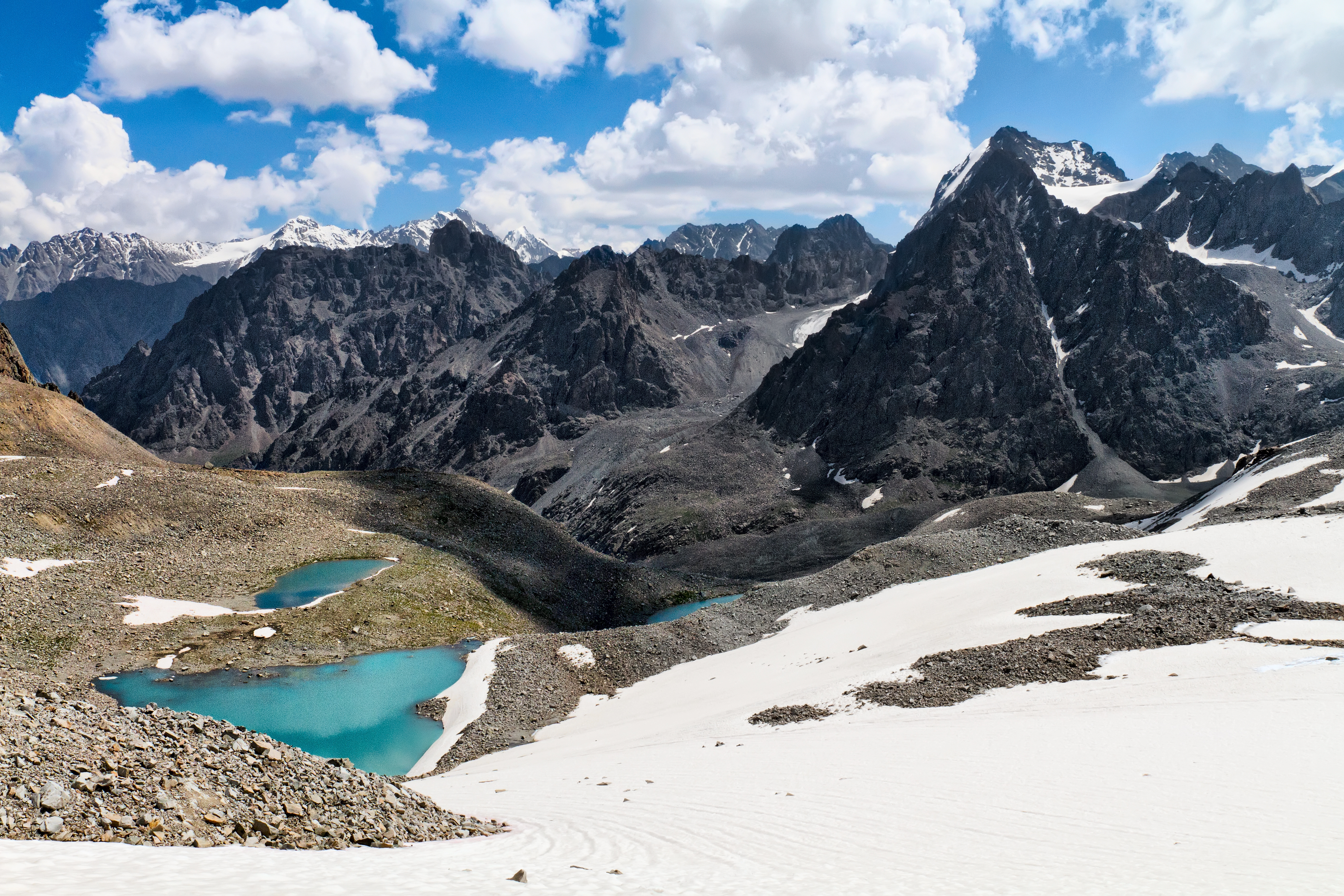
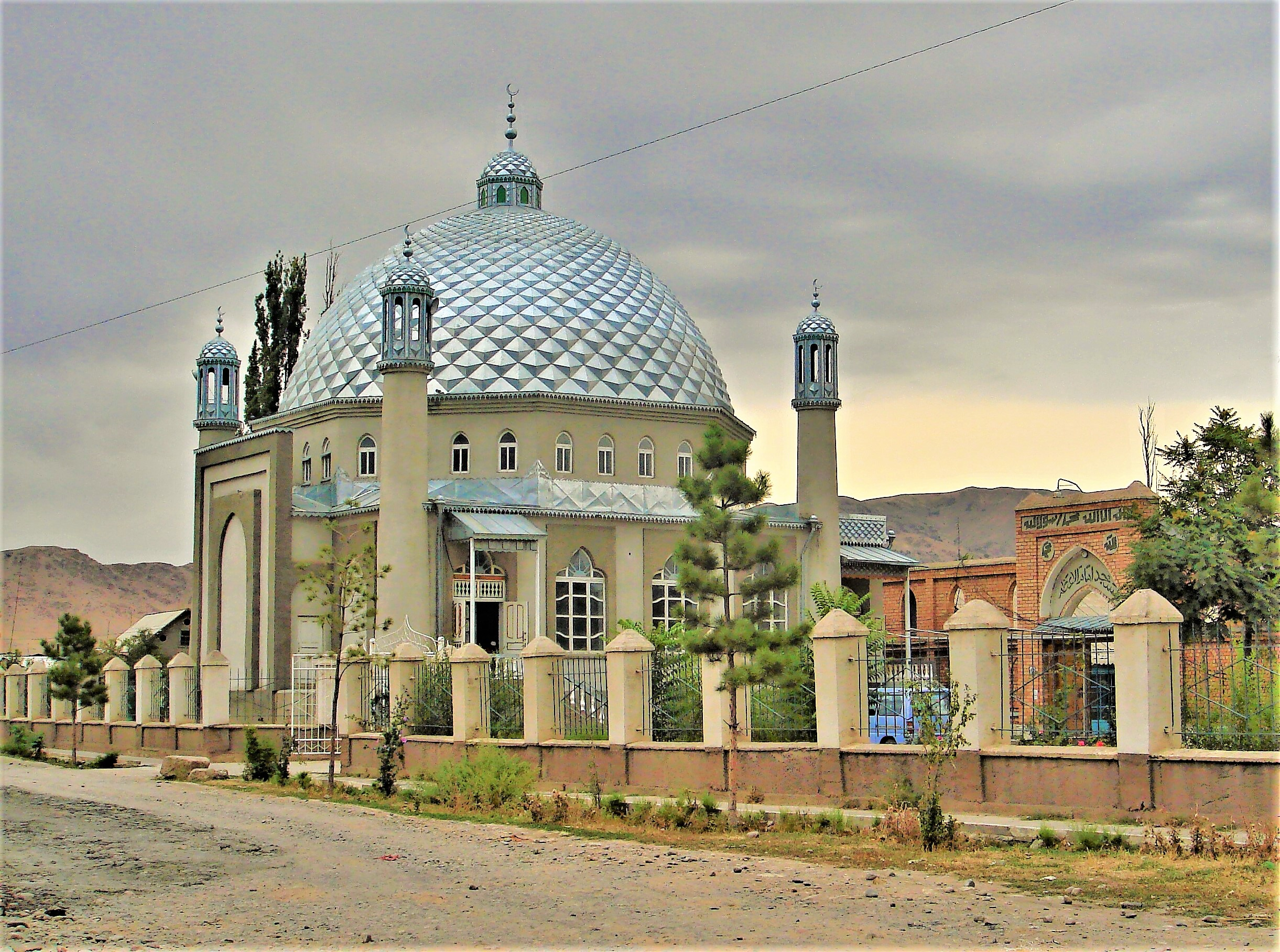
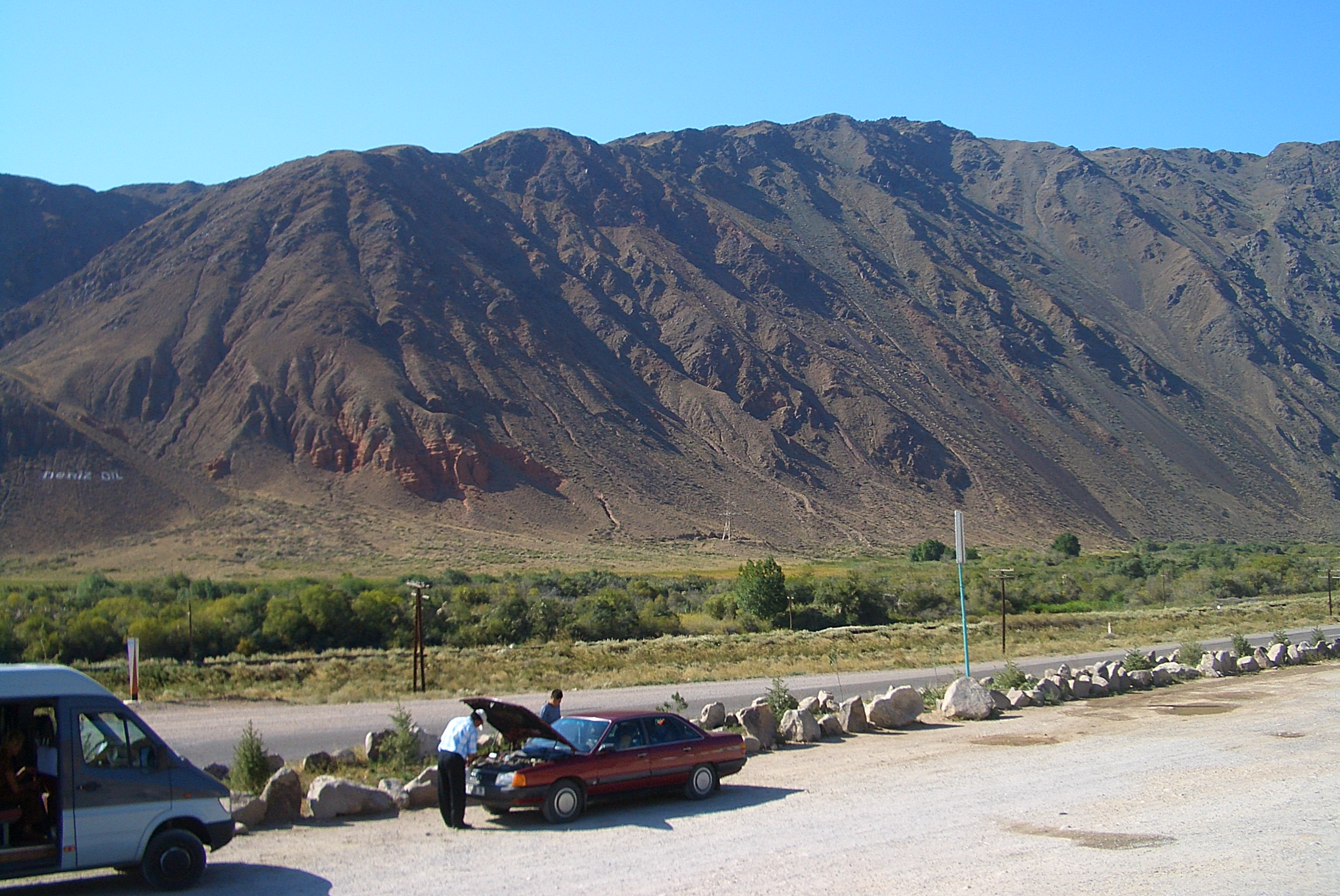
- From the top to bottom-right, Ala-Archa Nature Park, Burana Tower, Alamüdün District, Tokmok, Boom Gorge

- Flag Coat of arms

- Map of Kyrgyzstan, location of Chüy Region highlighted
- Coordinates: 42°30′N 74°30′E
- Country: Kyrgyzstan
- Capital: Bishkek

Government
  - Akim: Kanat Dzhumagaziev

Area
  - Total: 19,895 km^{2} (7,682 sq mi)

Population (2023-01-01)
  - Total: 1,068,702
  - Density: 53.717/km^{2} (139.13/sq mi)
- Time zone: UTC+6 (KGT)
- ISO 3166 code: KG-C
- Districts: 8
- Cities: 7
- Towns: 1
- Villages: 331

Chüy (Note: Kyrgyz: Чүй облусу, romanized: Chüi oblusu; Russian: Чуйская область, romanized: Chuyskaya oblast; Dungan: Чўхә җу) is the northernmost region of Kyrgyzstan, surrounding the national capital Bishkek. It is bounded on the north by Kazakhstan, and clockwise, Issyk-Kul Region, Naryn Region, Jalal-Abad Region, and Talas Region. Its administrative center is Bishkek. Its total area is 19,895 km^{2} (7,682 sq mi). The resident population of the region was 974,984 as of January 2021. The region has sizeable Russian (20.8% in 2009) and Dungan (6.2% in 2009) minorities. It takes its name from the river Chüy that flows through the region.

== History ==
In 1926, the area of the current region became part of the newly established Kirghiz ASSR. In 1939, the Frunze Region (oblast) was established. In 1959, Frunze Region was dissolved, and its constituent districts became districts of republican significance (not subordinated to a region). In 1990, the Chüy Region was established. From 2003 to 2006, its administrative center was Tokmok.

During the Soviet period, various agro-processing and other industries were established throughout the province, giving rise to several urban centers such as Tokmok, Kant and Kara-Balta.

== Geography ==
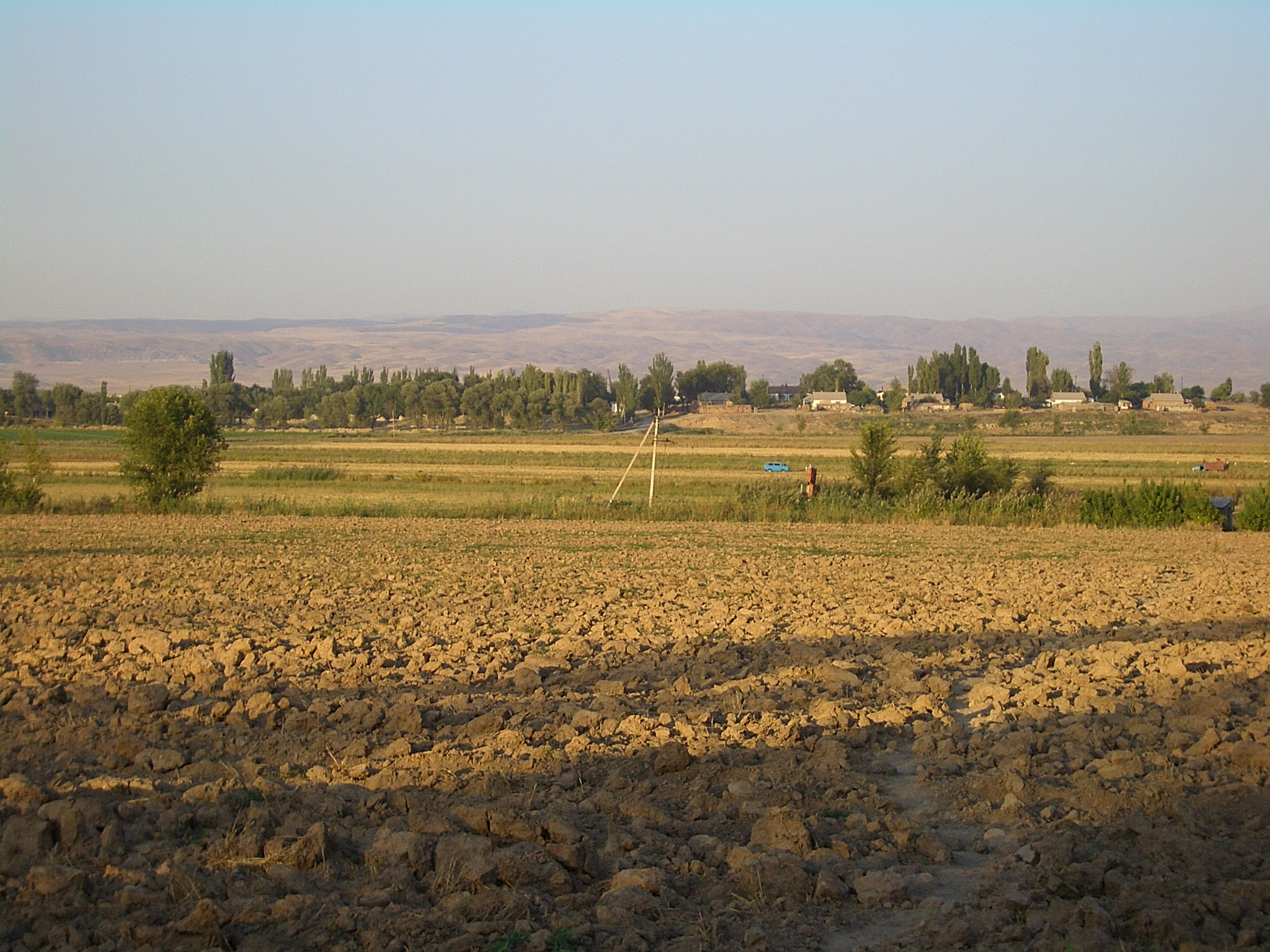
Chüy River valley

The main northwest part of the region is flat, a rarity in Kyrgyzstan. This is the Chüy Valley, the valley of the river Chu (Chüy). The valley's black soil is fertile and largely irrigated with water diverted from the Chu. The region's agricultural production includes wheat, maize, sugar beets, potatoes, lucerne, and various vegetables and fruits.

The Kyrgyz Ala-Too mountains form the southern border of the region and the northern border of the Talas Region. There are many hiking and trekking routes accessible from the towns in the valley. The southwestern heel of the region over the Kyrgyz Alatau is geographically more similar to the Naryn Region.

The northeast panhandle is the Chong Kemin Valley.

=== Hydrology ===
Most of Chüy Region lies within the Chu and Naryn river basins. The Chu enters the Chüy Valley through Boom Gorge and receives the Chong-Kemin and Kichi-Kemin as right-bank tributaries. The Kegeti, Ysyk-Ata, Alamüdün and Kara-Balta rivers descend from the northern slopes of the Kyrgyz Ala-Too into the Chüy Valley, where much of their flow is diverted for irrigation. South of the range, the Suusamyr River drains into the Naryn basin via the Kökömeren.

== Divisions ==
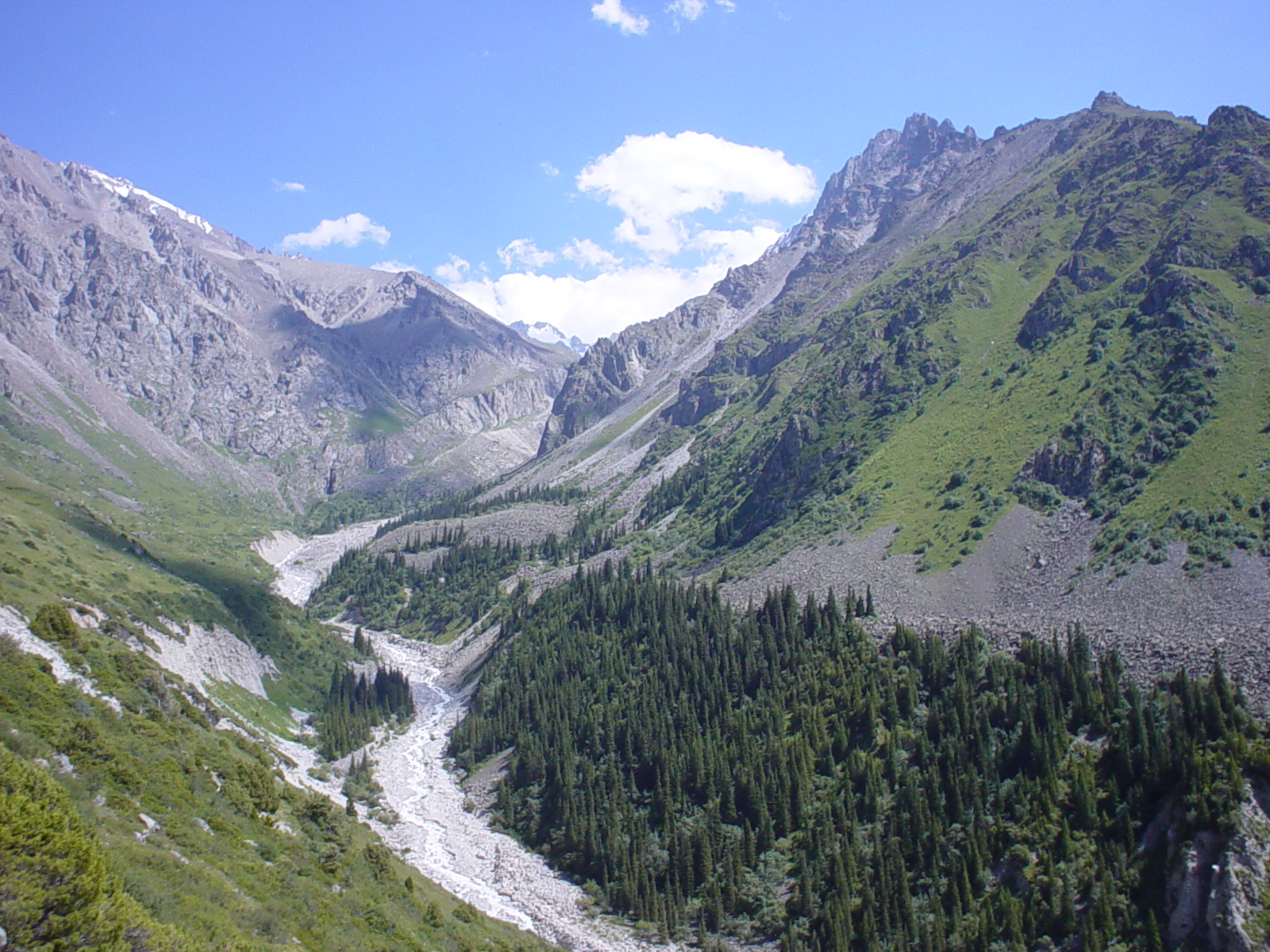
Looking up the Ala Archa river valley in the mountains south of Bishkek

The Chüy Region is divided administratively into one city of regional significance (Tokmok), and eight districts:

District	Seat	Population (2021)	Map
City of Tokmok	Tokmok	71,443	
Alamüdün District	Lebedinovka	188,484	
Chüy District	Tokmok	54,622	
Jayyl District	Kara-Balta	112,211	
Kemin District	Kemin	48,360	
Moskva District	Belovodskoye	103,007	
Panfilov District	Kayyngdy	47,938	
Sokuluk District	Sokuluk	194,579	
Ysyk-Ata District	Kant	154,340	

Kant, Kara-Balta, Kayyngdy, Kemin, Orlovka and Shopokov are cities of district significance. There is one urban-type settlement in the region: Bordu (part of Kemin District).

The Chüy District surrounds the city of Tokmok. The Alamüdün District surrounds the city of Bishkek, which however is not part of Chüy Region but a region-level administrative unit in its own right. The southwestern heel is administered as two exclaves of Jayyl and Panfilov Districts, Panfilov having a valley to the southeast and Jayyl the mountains to the north, west and southwest.

== Economy ==
The economically active population of Chüy Region in 2009 was 349,921, of which 297,298 were employed and 52,632 (15.0%) unemployed.

Agricultural production includes wheat, maize, sugar beets, potatoes, lucerne, and various vegetables and fruits. The region is the most industrialised and agriculturally developed in Kyrgyzstan.

- Export: 294.3 million US dollars (2009)
- Import: 202.5 million US dollars (2009)
- Direct Foreign Investments (2009): 57 million US dollars

== Transport ==
The main east-west transportation axis of the region is the Taraz-Bishkek-Balykchy highway, running through most major cities of the region. This road's section west of Bishkek is part of European route E40, known locally as Highway M-39 (based on the old USSR highway numbering scheme). The same numbers apply to the road that continues north-east from Bishkek toward Almaty, crossing the river Chüy and leaving the region for Kazakhstan at Korday border crossing.

The only railway in the region runs along the same Taraz-Bishkek-Balykchy route; it sees comparatively little use these days.

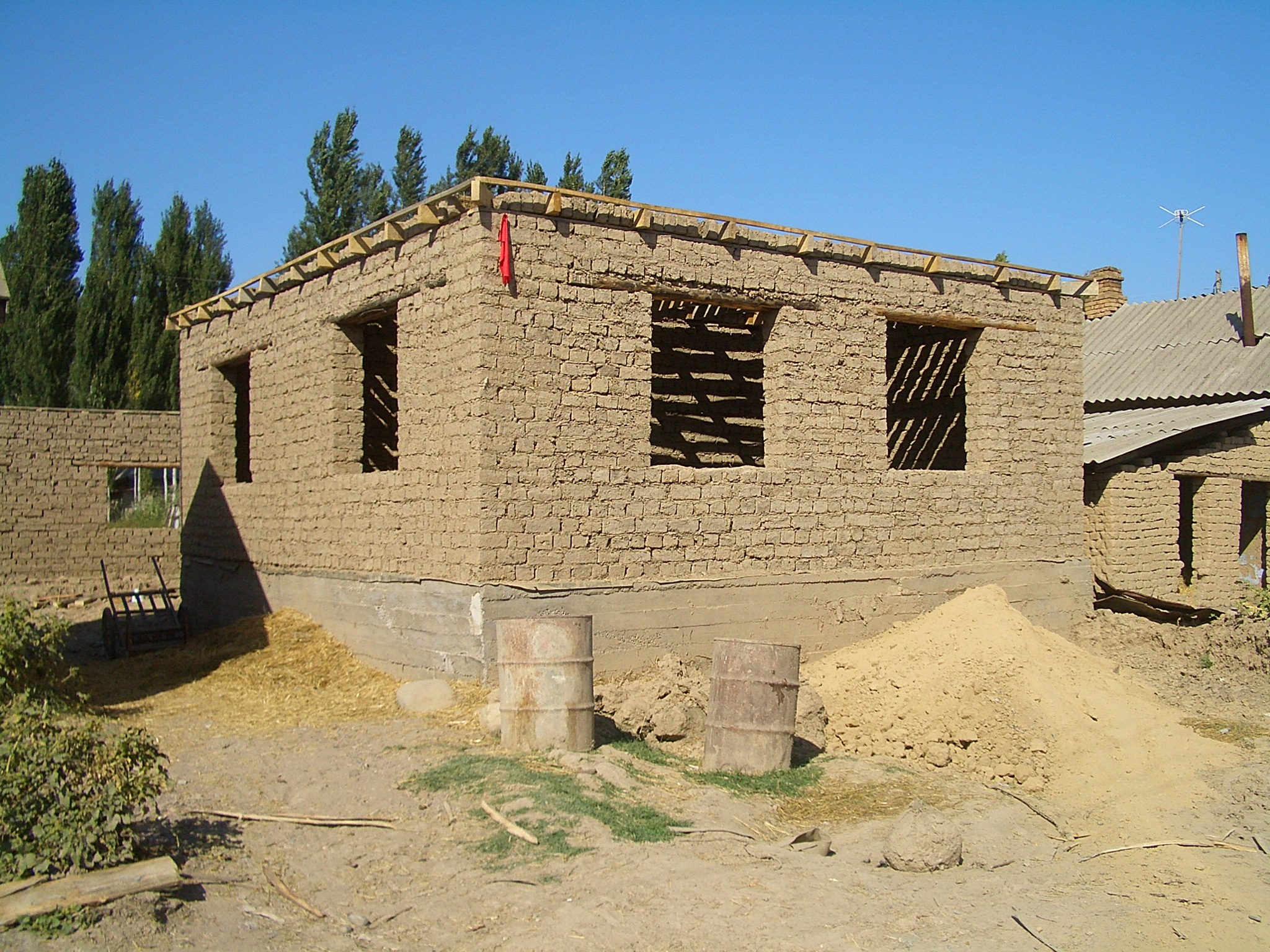
Building an adobe bricken house in Milyanfan

== Demographics ==
The resident population of Chüy Region, according to the Population and Housing Census of 2009, was 803,230. The Region's estimated population was 974,984 at the beginning of 2021.

Historical populations in Chüy Region
Year	Pop.	±%
1970	621,004	—
1979	700,063	+12.7%
1989	796,692	+13.8%
1999	770,811	−3.2%
2009	803,230	+4.2%
2021	974,984	+21.4%
Note: resident population; Sources:

=== Ethnic composition ===
The population is considerably more heterogeneous than that of the other regions of the country, with many ethnic Russians, Ukrainians, Dungans, Koreans, Germans, etc.

According to the 2009 Census, the ethnic composition (de jure population) of Chüy Region was:

Ethnic group	Population	Proportion of Chüy Region population
Kyrgyzs	474,805	59.1%
Russians	167,135	20.8%
Dungans	49,802	6.2%
Uygurs	15,276	1.9%
Uzbeks	14,755	1.8%
Kazakhs	12,800	1.6%
Turks	11,124	1.4%
Ukrainians	10,850	1.4%
Azerbaijanis	10,196	1.3%
Tatars	6,482	0.8%
Germans	5,919	0.7%
Kurds	4,544	0.6%
Koreans	4,388	0.5%
Tajiks	2,600	0.3%
Lesgins	2,246	0.3%
Dargins	1,812	0.2%
Karachays	1,379	0.2%
Chechens	1,316	0.2%
other groups	5,801	0.7%

== Gallery ==
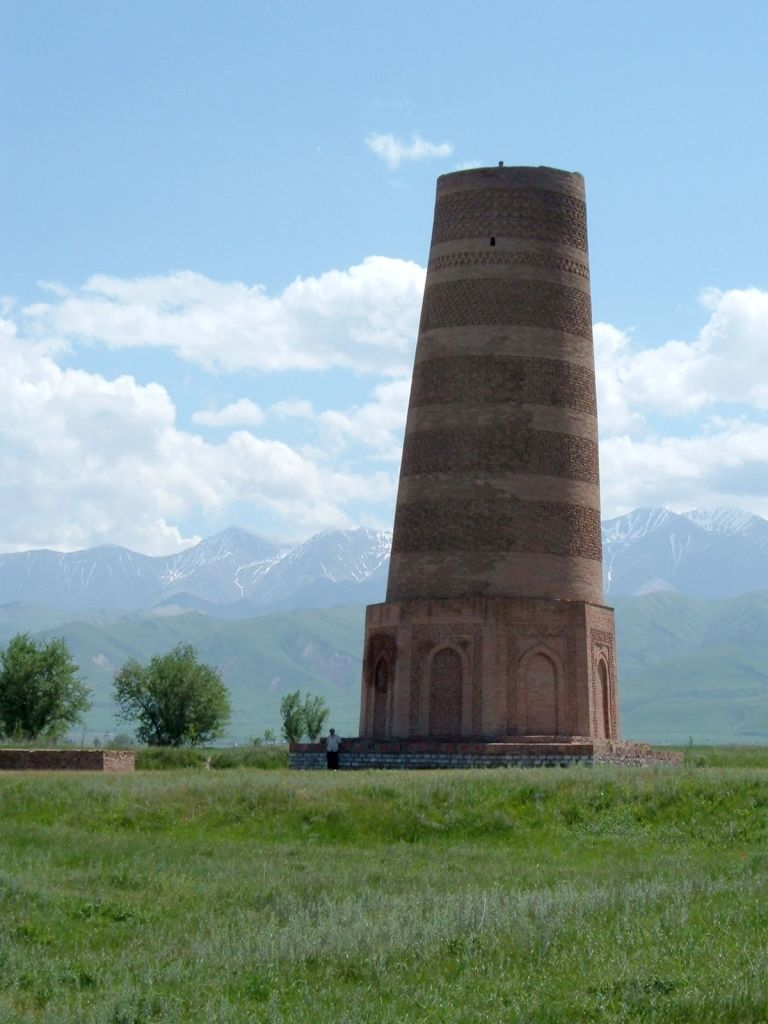
Burana Tower

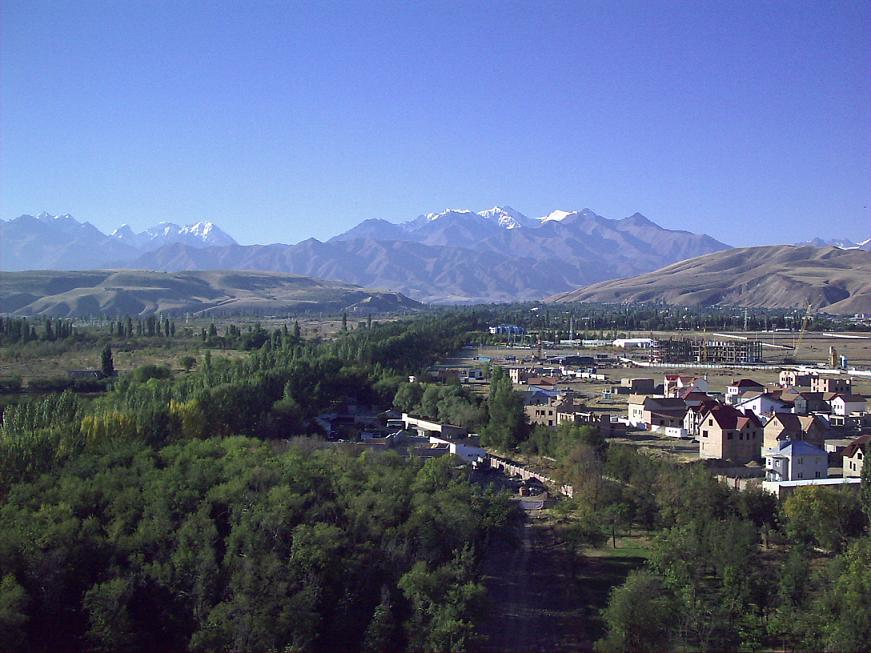
Southern outskirts of Bishkek

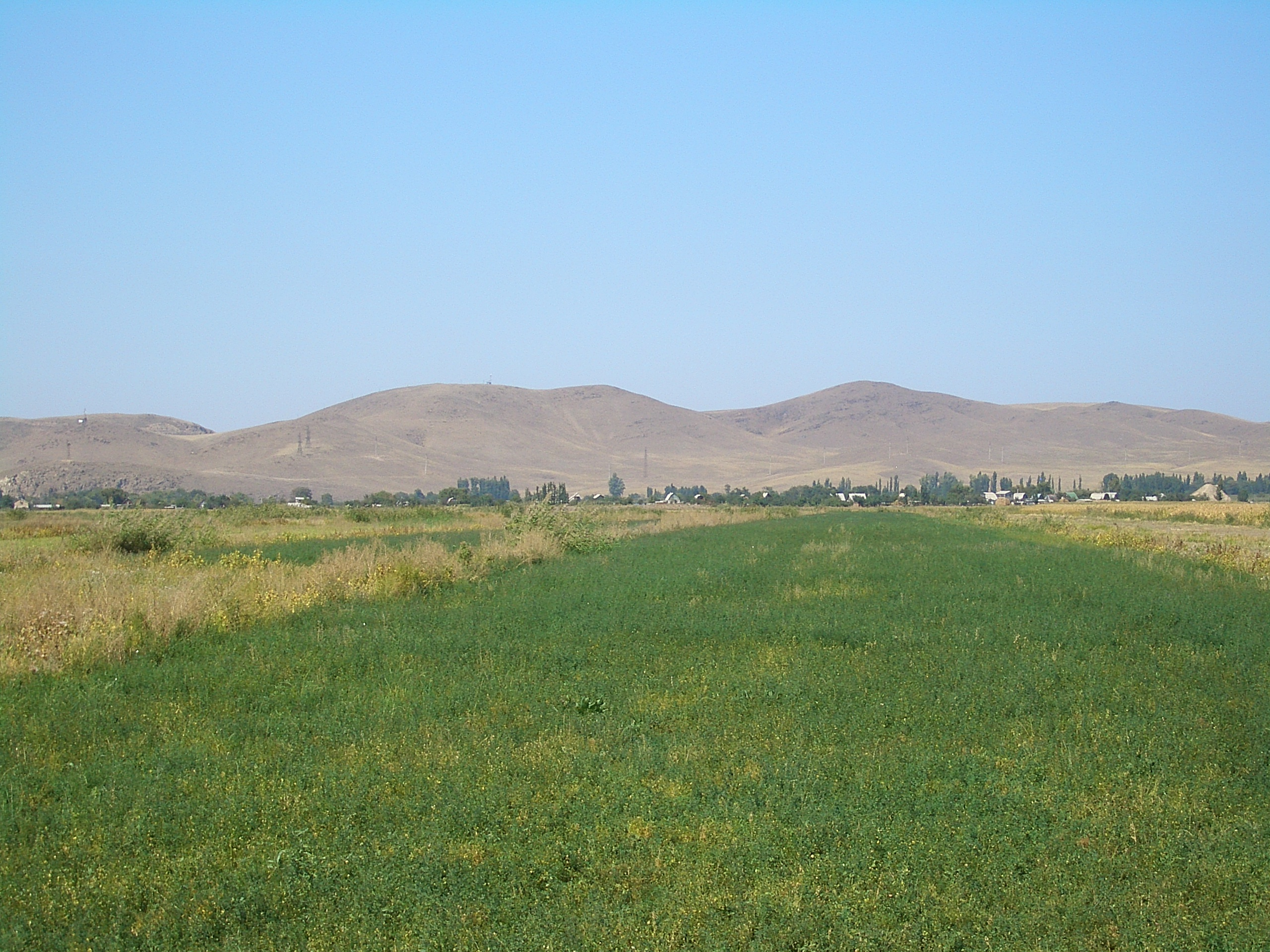
In the Chüy Valley

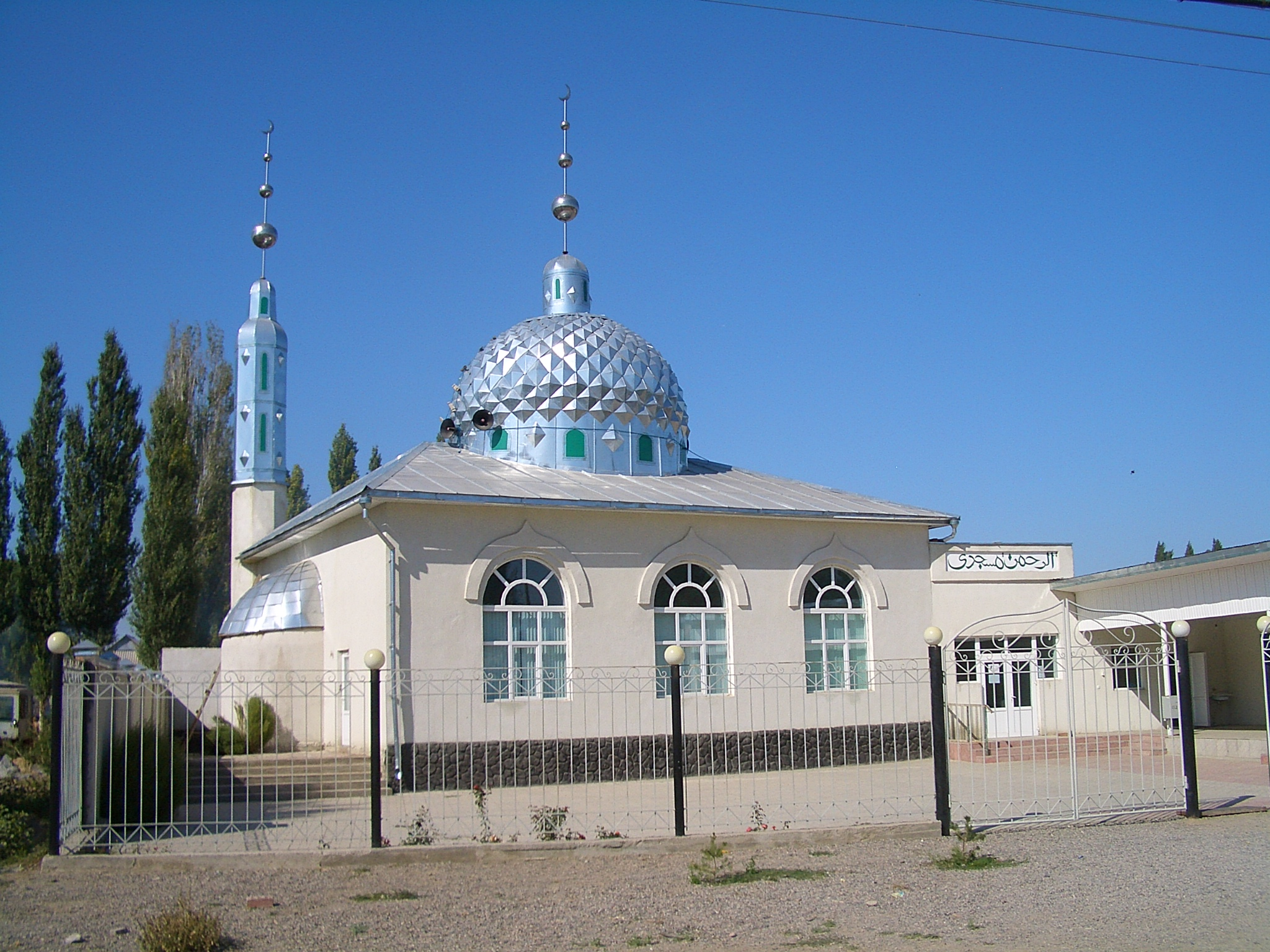
A new mosque in Milyanfan, Ysyk-Ata District

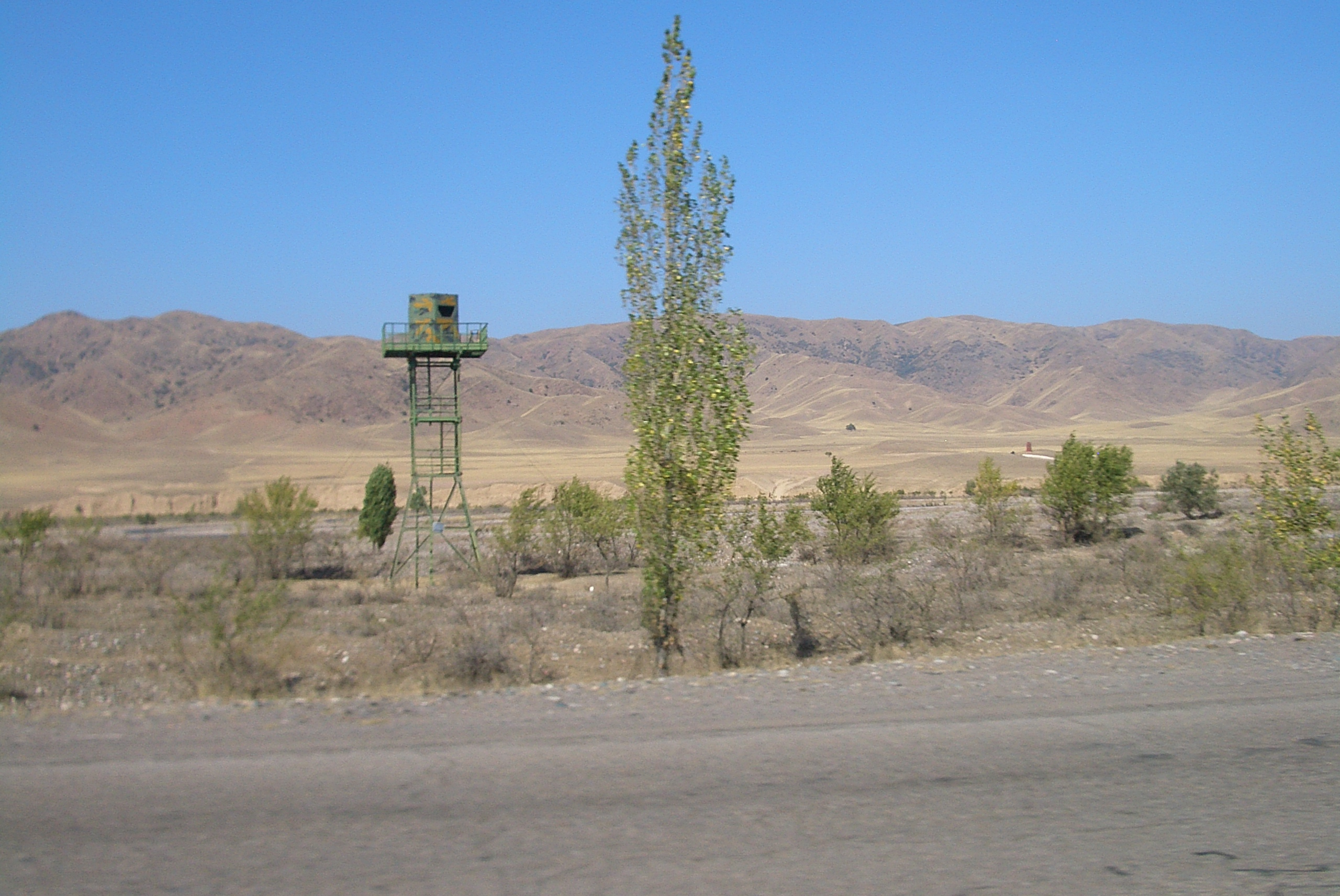
On the Kazakh border

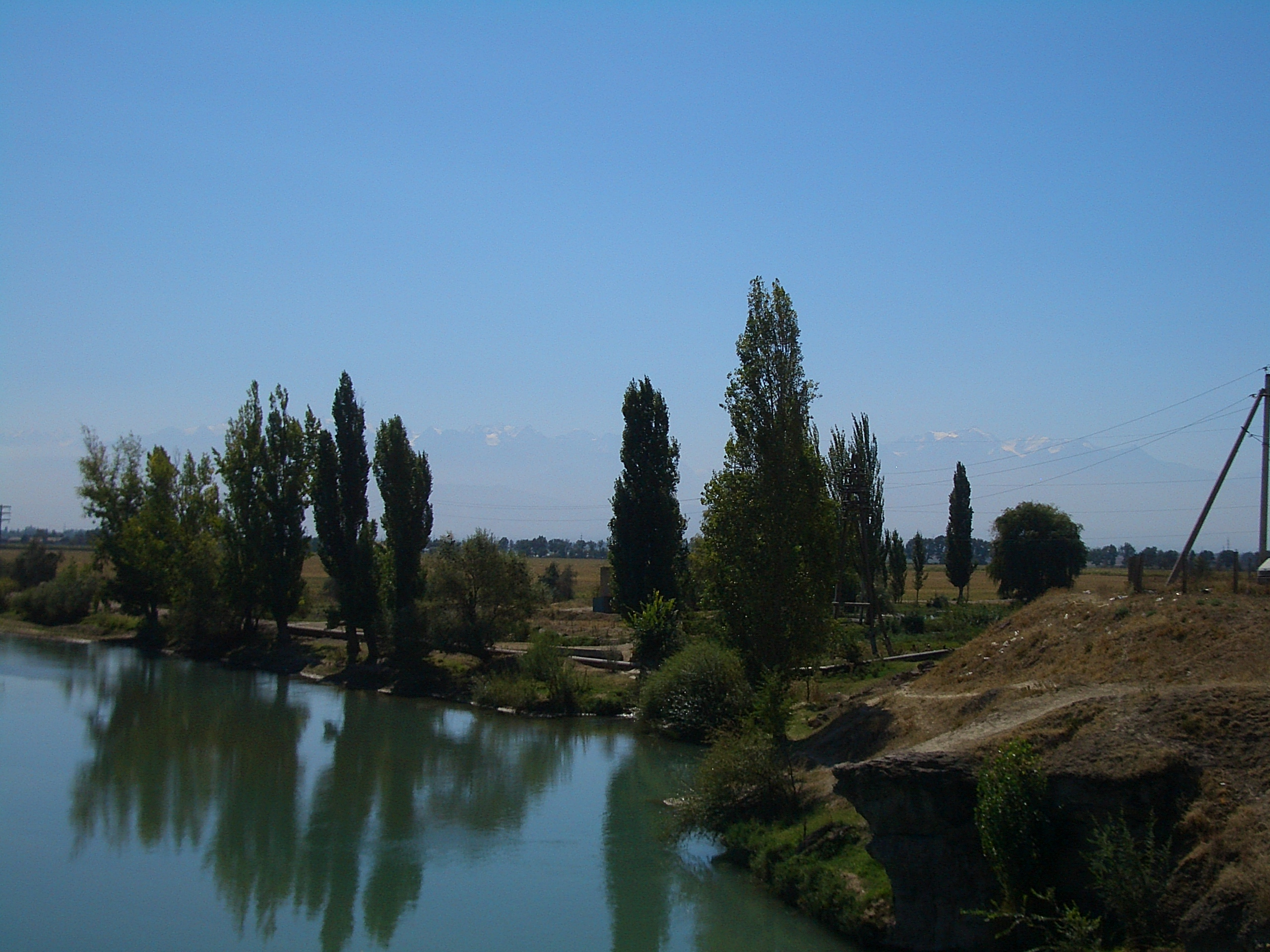
The river Chüy near Korday
