= Kyrgyz Regional League =

Third tier of the football league system in Kyrgyzstan

- Founded: 2022
- Country: Kyrgyzstan
- Level on pyramid: 3
- Promotion to: Kyrgyz First League
- Domestic cup: Kyrgyzstan Cup
- Current champions: FC Athlete (2025
- Most championships: 4 clubs (1 title)

The Kyrgyz Regional League is the amateur third-tier league of football in Kyrgyzstan, operating under the auspices of the Kyrgyz Football Union.

== History ==
=== 2022 ===
The Kyrgyz Regional League, sometimes also called the Second League, was formed in 2022 with the purpose of developing football in the Regions of Kyrgyzstan. When the first edition of the league kicked off in May of that year, six clubs from only the Chüy Region participated. These first six clubs were: FC Voyenno-Antonovka (Voyenno-Antonovka), FC Shopokov (Shopokov), FC Belovodsk (Belovodskoye), FC Kyzyl-Tuu (Kyzyl-Tuu), and FSC Tokmok (Tokmok), FC Alga Kapar-Ata (Jer-Kazar). Prior to the start of the season, clubs from the Osh and Jalal-Abad Regions had also joined. The final that season was contested as a two-match, home-and-away series against FSC Tokmok and FC Tepe-Korgon from the Osh Zone. With the aggregate scored tied 5-5 after the two matches, FSC Tokmok were crowded the inaugural champions on away goals.

=== 2023 ===
For the 2023 season, teams from all seven regions entered the league. That year, FC Kok-Jangak faced FC Kyzyl Tuu. Kyzyl Tuu won through a brace from Myktybek Mukayev and a Best Player performance by Erkin Damirov to become champions.

=== 2024 ===
The final four teams in 2024 were FC Jallywood, FC Tepe-Korgon, FC Frunze, and FC Muras 2019. FC Frunze and FC Jallywood advanced to the championship match with Funze winning the contest 2–0. The league's best goalkeeper, forward, and MVP were Dosmatov Zhavokhir of FC Tepe-Korgon), Zhanat Sultanbaev of Frunze, and Chynybekov Shumkar of FC Jallywood, respectively.

=== 2025 ===
The 2025 final was contested between two clubs from Chüy, FC Asylbash of the Sokuluk District and FC Athlete. With the score level at 2–2 at the end of regulation time, FC Athlete won the championship on penalties 4–2.

== Format ==
The league is divided into seven zones coinciding with the seven Regions of Kyrgyzstan. Following the first stage, the zonal champions compete in a play-off competition.

== Promotion/relegation ==
The winner of the Regional League is promoted to the Kyrgyz First League.

== Champions ==
Season	Champion	Ref.
2022	FSC Tokmok	
2023	FC Kyzyl Tuu	
2024	FC Frunze	
2025	FC Athlete	
2026		

== See also ==
- Football in Kyrgyzstan
