= Jayylma, Chüy Region =

Village in Chüy Region, Kyrgyzstan

Jayylma Kyrgyz: Жайылма Jayilma
- Village
- Location within Kyrgyzstan
- Coordinates: 42°50′01″N 73°39′22″E
- Country: Kyrgyzstan
- Region: Chüy Region
- District: Panfilov District
- Rural community: Kurama
- Founded: 1936

Population (2022)
  - Total: 823
- Time zone: UTC+6

Jayylma (Kyrgyz: Жайылма; also spelled Jayilma) is a village in Panfilov District of Chüy Region, Kyrgyzstan. It is part of the Kurama rural community (ayyl aymak). Founded in 1936, its population was 823 at the 2022 census.

The village is listed in the 2025 state administrative-territorial classifier under SOATE code 41708 219 822 02 0.

== History ==
Jayylma was founded in 1936.

== Geography ==
Jayylma is situated in the northwestern part of the Chüy Valley, near Kayyngdy, the administrative centre of Panfilov District. According to the 2004 geographical encyclopedia of Kyrgyzstan, the village is located approximately 6 km from the district centre and the nearest railway station.

Jayylma is one of four villages in the Kurama rural community, alongside Panfilov, Orto-Aryk and Efironos.

== Population ==
According to the 2004 geographical encyclopedia of Kyrgyzstan, Jayylma had 984 inhabitants in 2002. Its population was 762 at the 2009 census and 823 at the 2022 census.

Historical population
Year	Pop.	±% p.a.
2002	984	—
2009	762	−3.59%
2022	823	+0.59%
Sources: Geography of Kyrgyzstan (2004); 2009 and 2022 population censuses.

== Notable people ==
- Toktonaly Seytaliev (1937–2021), Soviet and Kyrgyz opera singer (lyric tenor), music educator and recipient of the People's Artist of the USSR title in 1984, was born in Jayylma.
