= Sokuluk (river) =

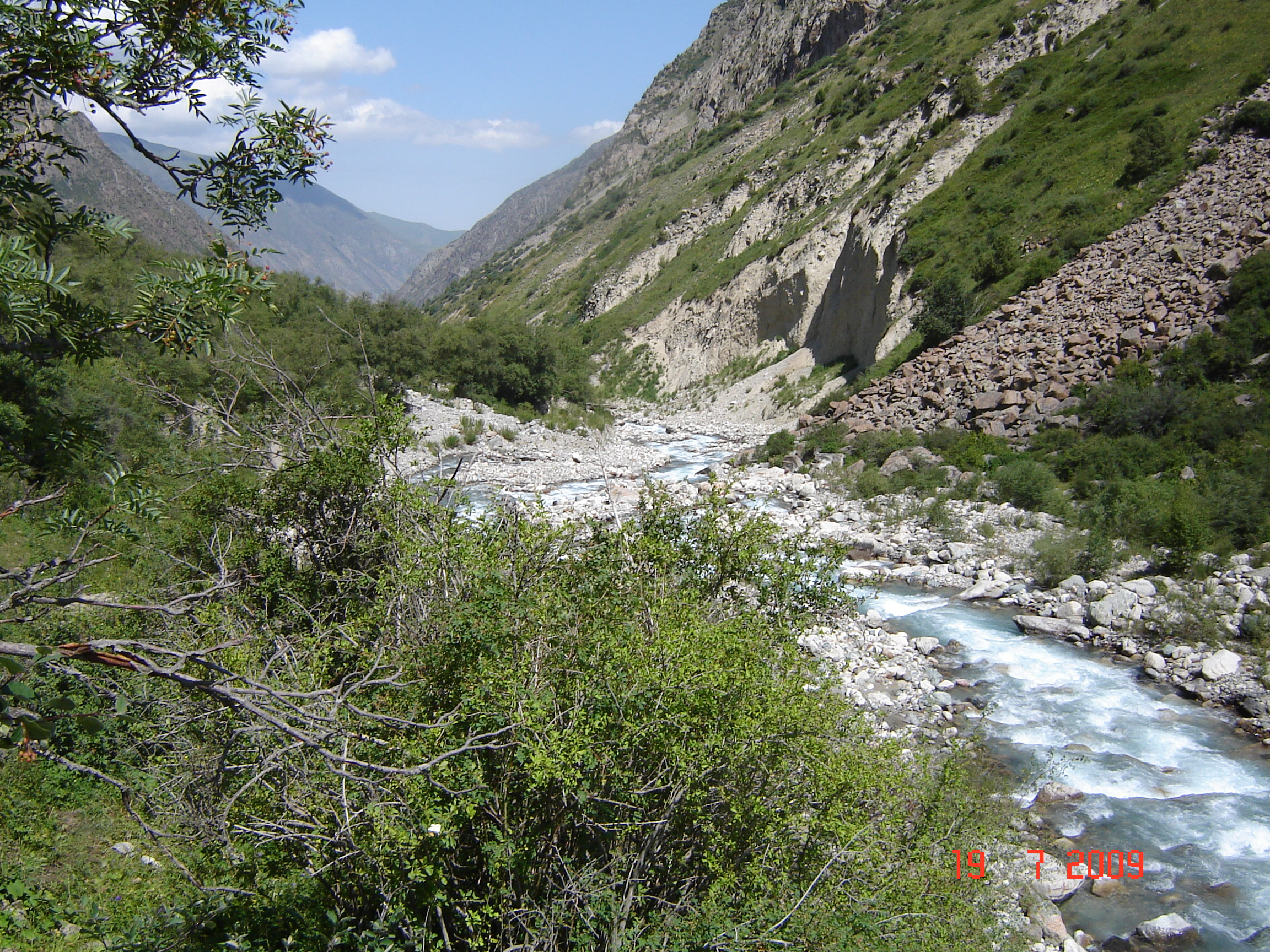
- Native name: Сокулук (Kyrgyz)

Location
- Country: Kyrgyzstan
- Region: Chüy Region
- District: Chüy District, Moskva District

Physical characteristics
- Source: confluence of Chong-Tör and Kichi-Tör rivers
  - location: Kyrgyz Ala-Too
  - coordinates: 43°32′06″N 74°16′18.4″E
- Mouth: Ak-Suu (Chu)
  - location: near Tölök
  - coordinates: 43°05′54.5″N 74°05′44.1″E
- Length: 87 km (54 mi)
- Basin size: 476 km^{2} (184 sq mi)
- Discharge
  - average: 5.14 m^{3}/s (182 cu ft/s)

Basin features
- Progression: Ak-Suu→ Chu→ Betpak-Dala desert
- River system: Chu

The Sokuluk (Kyrgyz: Сокулук) is a river in Chüy District and Moskva District of Chüy Region of Kyrgyzstan. The river is formed by confluence of Chong-Tör and Kichi-Tör. The Sokuluk flows into Ak-Suu near Tölök village. The river is 87 km (54 mi) long, and has a watershed area of 476 km^{2} (184 sq mi). The annual average flow rate is 5.14 m^{3}/s (182 cu ft/s); the maximum flow is from May to September. The river rises from the northern slopes of Kyrgyz Ala-Too and enters Chüy Valley where it flows into Ak-Suu. Sokuluk is fed by melt-, glacier-, snow and spring water. The basin of the river contains 48 glaciers totaling 57.9 km^{2} (22.4 sq mi). The river is used for irrigation. Tösh-Bulak, Sokuluk are located at the river.
