= Jardy Kayyngdy =

River in northern Kyrgyzstan

- Native name: Kyrgyz: Жардыкайыңды

Location
- Country: Kyrgyzstan
- Region: Chüy Region
- District: Panfilov District

Physical characteristics
- Source: Glaciers of the Kyrgyz Ala-Too
  - location: Northern slopes
- Mouth: Dissipates south of Orto-Aryk
- Length: 31 km (19 mi)
- Basin size: 191 km^{2} (74 sq mi)
- Discharge
  - average: 1.64 m^{3}/s (58 cu ft/s)

Basin features
- River system: Chu basin

The Jardy Kayyngdy (Kyrgyz: Жардыкайыңды or Жарды Кайыңды) is a river in Panfilov District, Chüy Region, Kyrgyzstan. It originates from glaciers on the northern slopes of the Kyrgyz Ala-Too and belongs to the Chu River basin. The river is 31 km (19 mi) long, and its drainage basin covers 191 km^{2} (74 sq mi).

== Course and basin ==
The Jardy-Kayyngdy flows through Panfilov District. It rises from glaciers in the central part of the Kyrgyz Ala-Too, and its flow ceases approximately 3 km (2 mi) south of Orto-Aryk. The mean elevation of the drainage basin is 3,000 m (9,800 ft) above sea level.

== Tributaries and lakes ==
The river has 28 tributaries with a combined length of 72 km (45 mi). Its basin contains small glaciers covering approximately 4 km^{2} (1.5 sq mi) and six lakes with a combined area of 0.14 km^{2} (0.054 sq mi).

== Hydrology ==
The river has high water from May to September and low water from October to April. Its long-term average discharge is 1.64 m^{3}/s (58 cu ft/s). Flow peaks in July, when the average discharge reaches 4.30 m^{3}/s (152 cu ft/s). In some years, the river dries up during winter.

== Human use ==
The Jardy-Kayyngdy is used for irrigation. The Kaptal, Kumaryk and Say canals draw water from the river and have a combined conveyance capacity of approximately 10 m^{3}/s (350 cu ft/s). Villages in the valley include Kaptal-Aryk, Orto-Aryk and Kürpüldök.

== Protected area ==
The river basin contains the Jardy-Kayyngdy Game Reserve, established in 1976 on the northern slopes of the Kyrgyz Ala-Too. Covering 8,700 ha (87 km^{2}), the reserve protects wildlife including roe deer, wild boar, ibex, chukar partridges and pheasants.
