= Kum-Aryk, Chüy Region =

Village in Chüy Region, Kyrgyzstan

Kum-Aryk Kyrgyz: Кум-Арык
- Village
- Entrance to Kum-Aryk

- Location within Kyrgyzstan
- Coordinates: 42°43′34″N 73°42′42″E
- Country: Kyrgyzstan
- Region: Chüy Region
- District: Panfilov District
- Rural community: Orto-Kayyngdy
- Founded: 1932

Population (2022)
  - Total: 1,919
- Time zone: UTC+6

Kum-Aryk (Kyrgyz: Кум-Арык) is a village in Panfilov District of Chüy Region, Kyrgyzstan. It is part of the Orto-Kayyngdy rural community (ayyl aymak). Founded in 1932, its population was 1,919 at the 2022 census.

The village has SOATE code 41708 219 811 06 0 in the 2025 state administrative-territorial classifier.

== History ==
Kum-Aryk was founded in 1932.

The village's name means "sandy irrigation canal" in Kyrgyz. A local account published in 2019 associates the name with the fine-textured, fertile soil of the area and dates its use to around 1934–1935.

=== Archaeology ===
The Kum-Aryk burial ground is situated near the village, in the Kaynar-Bulak area at the northern foothills of the Kyrgyz Ala-Too Range, approximately 20 km southwest of Kara-Balta. The site contains 38 burial mounds measuring 5–16 m in diameter and up to 1.5 m in height.

Archaeological excavations conducted in 1975 by a team from the Institute of History of the Academy of Sciences of the Kirghiz SSR investigated 31 mounds, including 28 containing catacomb burials. The excavations uncovered pottery, bronze mirrors, beads, iron knives and other artifacts. The principal catacomb burials were identified as belonging to the Kenkol archaeological tradition, while a separate pit burial was dated to the 6th–4th centuries BC.

== Geography ==
Kum-Aryk is situated in the southwestern part of the Chüy Valley, near the northern foothills of the Kyrgyz Ala-Too Range. The village is approximately 19 km from Kayyngdy, the administrative centre of Panfilov District, and 19 km from the nearest railway station.

== Population ==
Kum-Aryk had 1,616 inhabitants in 2002, 1,720 at the 2009 census, and 1,919 at the 2022 census.

Historical population
Year	Pop.	±% p.a.
2002	1,616	—
2009	1,720	+0.89%
2022	1,919	+0.85%
Sources: Geography of Kyrgyzstan (2004); 2009 and 2022 population censuses.

== Economy ==
Agriculture is an important activity in Kum-Aryk. Crops cultivated in the village in 2019 included wheat, barley, apples and pears.

== Notable people ==
- Muratbek Kozhobekov (born 1958), Kyrgyz historian, professor and journalist, was born in Kum-Aryk.
