= Ozernoye, Panfilov District =

Village in Chüy Region, Kyrgyzstan

Ozernoye Kyrgyz: Озерное
- Village
- Location within Kyrgyzstan
- Coordinates: 42°58′04″N 73°37′47″E
- Country: Kyrgyzstan
- Region: Chüy Region
- District: Panfilov District
- Rural community: Kürpüldök
- Founded: 1932

Population (2022)
  - Total: 355
- Time zone: UTC+6

Ozernoye (Kyrgyz: Озерное; Russian: Озёрное) is a village in Panfilov District of Chüy Region, Kyrgyzstan. It is part of the Kürpüldök rural community (ayyl aymak). Founded in 1932, its population was 355 at the 2022 census.

The village is listed in the 2025 state administrative-territorial classifier under SOATE code 41708 219 816 02 0.

== History ==
Ozernoye was founded in 1932.

== Geography ==
Ozernoye is situated in the northwestern part of the Chüy Valley, near the border with Kazakhstan, north of the Great Chüy Canal. The village is approximately 22 km from Kayyngdy, the administrative centre of Panfilov District, and 22 km from the nearest railway station.

== Population ==
Ozernoye had 354 inhabitants in 2002, 282 at the 2009 census, and 355 at the 2022 census.

Historical population
Year	Pop.	±% p.a.
2002	354	—
2009	282	−3.20%
2022	355	+1.79%
Sources: Geography of Kyrgyzstan (2004); 2009 and 2022 population censuses.
