= Oktyabrskoye, Panfilov District =

Village in Chüy Region, Kyrgyzstan

Oktyabrskoye Kyrgyz: Октябрь
- Village
- Location within Kyrgyzstan
- Coordinates: 42°56′24″N 73°33′34″E
- Country: Kyrgyzstan
- Region: Chüy Region
- District: Panfilov District
- Rural community: Kürpüldök
- Founded: 1934

Population (2022)
  - Total: 1,279
- Time zone: UTC+6

Oktyabrskoye (Kyrgyz: Октябрь; Russian: Октябрьское) is a village in Panfilov District, Chüy Region, Kyrgyzstan. It is part of the Kürpüldök rural community (ayyl aymak) and had a population of 1,279 at the 2022 census.

The 2025 state administrative-territorial classifier lists it under Kürpüldök with SOATE code 41708 219 816 03 0.

== History ==
The village was founded in 1934 and is also recorded as Oktyabr (Komsomol).

== Geography ==
Oktyabrskoye lies in the western Chüy Valley, near the border with Kazakhstan and northwest of Kayyngdy, the district centre.

== Population ==
The village had 1,546 inhabitants in 2002. Its population fell to 1,160 at the 2009 census and rose to 1,279 at the 2022 census.

Historical population
Year	Pop.	±% p.a.
2002	1,546	—
2009	1,160	−4.02%
2022	1,279	+0.75%
Sources: Geography of Kyrgyzstan (2004) and the 2009 and 2022 population censuses.
