= Oyrondu =

Village in Chüy Region, Kyrgyzstan

Oyrondu Kyrgyz: Ойронду Oyrongdu
- Village
- Location within Kyrgyzstan
- Coordinates: 43°00′28″N 73°38′00″E
- Country: Kyrgyzstan
- Region: Chüy Region
- District: Panfilov District
- Rural community: Kürpüldök
- Founded: 1931

Population (2022)
  - Total: 457
- Time zone: UTC+6

Oyrondu (Kyrgyz: Ойронду; also spelled Oyrongdu) is a village in Panfilov District of Chüy Region, Kyrgyzstan. It is part of the Kürpüldök rural community (ayyl aymak). Founded in 1931, its population was 457 at the 2022 census.

The village is listed in the 2025 state administrative-territorial classifier under SOATE code 41708 219 816 04 0.

== History ==
Oyrondu was founded in 1931.

== Geography ==
Oyrondu is situated in the northwestern part of the Chüy Valley, near the border with Kazakhstan. According to the 2004 geographical encyclopedia of Kyrgyzstan, the village is located approximately 25 km from Kayyngdy, the administrative centre of Panfilov District.

== Population ==
According to the 2004 geographical encyclopedia of Kyrgyzstan, Oyrondu had 459 inhabitants in 2002. Its population was 425 at the 2009 census and 457 at the 2022 census.

Historical population
Year	Pop.	±% p.a.
2002	459	—
2009	425	−1.09%
2022	457	+0.56%
Sources: Geography of Kyrgyzstan (2004); 2009 and 2022 population censuses.
