= Kirov, Panfilov =

Village in Chüy Region, Kyrgyzstan

Kirov Kyrgyz: Киров
- Village
- Location within Kyrgyzstan
- Coordinates: 42°53′31″N 73°38′22″E
- Country: Kyrgyzstan
- Region: Chüy Region
- District: Panfilov District
- Rural community: Kürpüldök
- Founded: 1910
- Elevation: 685 m (2,247 ft)

Population (2022)
  - Total: 985
- Time zone: UTC+6

Kirov (Kyrgyz: Киров) is a village in Panfilov District of Chüy Region, Kyrgyzstan. It is the administrative centre of the Kürpüldök rural community (ayyl aymak). Its population was 985 in 2022. The village was founded in 1910. The village is listed in the 2025 state administrative-territorial classifier under SOATE code 41708 219 816 06 0.

== Geography ==
Kirov is situated in the western part of the Chüy Valley, at an elevation of approximately 685 m above sea level.

== Economy and infrastructure ==
The local economy is primarily based on crop cultivation and livestock farming. The village has a secondary school, a library, and primary healthcare facilities. A monument commemorating those killed during the Second World War is also located in the village.
