= Panfilov District, Kyrgyzstan =

District in Chüy Region, Kyrgyzstan

Coordinates: 42°49′N 73°40′E

Panfilov Панфилов району
- District
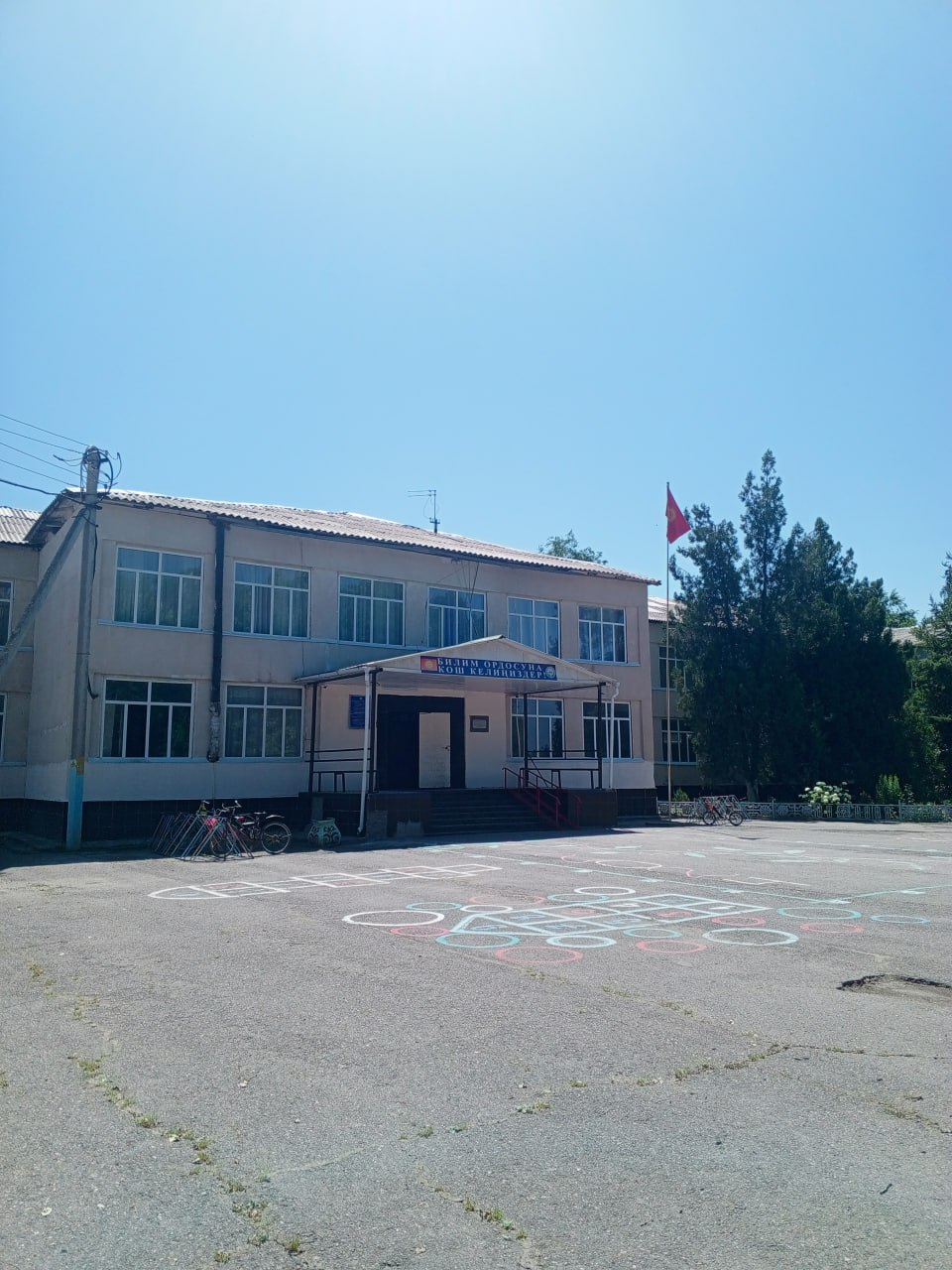
- School in Kayyngdy

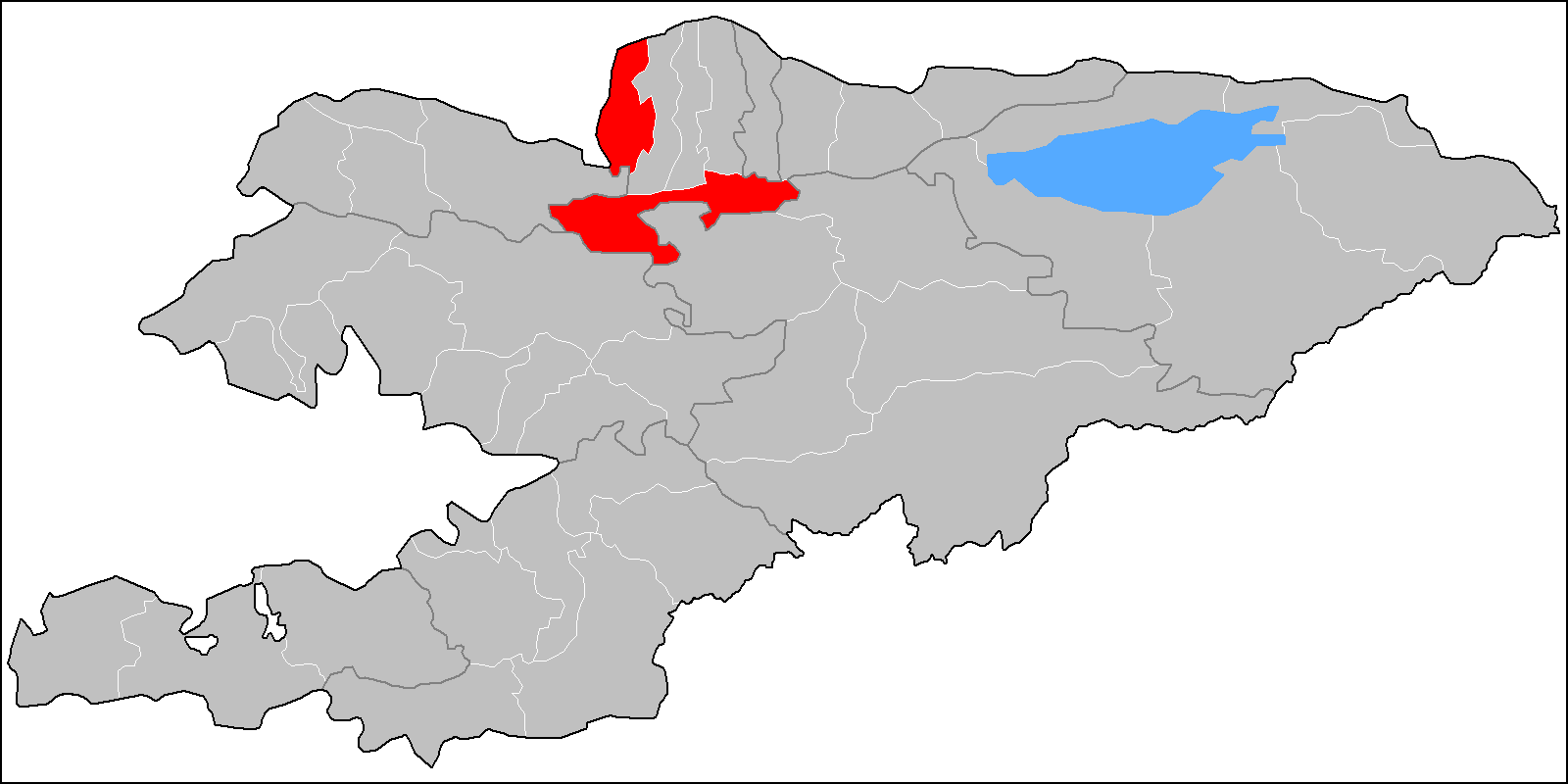
- Country: Kyrgyzstan
- Region: Chüy Region
- Administrative seat: Kayyngdy

Area
  - Total: 4,861 km^{2} (1,877 sq mi)

Population (2023)
  - Total: 49,555
  - Density: 10.19/km^{2} (26.40/sq mi)
- Time zone: UTC+6

The Panfilov District (Kyrgyz: Панфилов району, Panfilov rayonu) is a district of Chüy Region in northern Kyrgyzstan. Its area is 4,861 square kilometres (1,877 sq mi), and its resident population was 49,555 in 2023. The administrative seat is Kayyngdy (Kaindy). The district occupies the westernmost part of Chüy Region and includes a mountainous exclave separated from its main territory by Jayyl District.

== Geography ==
Panfilov District consists of two geographically separate sections, situated in the Chüy Valley and the Suusamyr Valley. The northern section borders Jayyl District to the east, Talas Region along a small part of its southern boundary, and Kazakhstan to the north and west. The southern, Suusamyr section borders Jayyl, Moskva, Sokuluk, and Alamüdün districts to the north along the Kyrgyz Ala-Too Range, Naryn Region to the east, Jalal-Abad Region to the southwest, and Talas Region to the west and northwest.

The district encompasses three principal geographical features: the Chüy Valley in the north, the Suusamyr Valley in the south, and the Kyrgyz Ala-Too Range separating them. The Chüy Valley lies at elevations of 600 to 1,100 metres (1,969 to 3,609 ft) above sea level, while the Suusamyr Valley lies at 2,000 to 3,200 metres (6,562 to 10,499 ft). The latter extends from Ala-Bel Pass (3,184 m) in the west towards Karakol Pass (3,452 m) in the east. Within the district, the Kyrgyz Ala-Too Range reaches an elevation of 4,416 m.

The district's rivers belong to the Chu and Naryn drainage basins. In the Chüy Valley section, the principal rivers include the Aspara (Ashpara), Chong-Kaiyngdy, Cholok-Kaiyngdy, Jardy Kayyngdy, Chorgolu, and Taldy-Bulak. In the southern Suusamyr section, the principal rivers are the Suusamyr and Batysh Karakol (Western Karakol).

The district also contains deposits of construction materials and mineral water springs.

Grey soils predominate in the valleys, while dark brown and black soils occur on mountain slopes. Brown soils are also found in the mountainous areas and the Suusamyr Valley.

== Natural hazards ==
The principal natural hazards in Panfilov District include floods, mudflows, groundwater flooding, landslides, and snow avalanches. Floods and mudflows particularly affect the Chong-Kaiyngdy and Jardy-Kaiyngdy river valleys, while groundwater flooding occurs in parts of the northern and central lowlands. The district also contains six potentially dangerous high-altitude lakes. Landslide and avalanche hazards occur mainly in mountainous areas, including sections of the Bishkek–Osh highway.

== Climate ==
Panfilov District has a continental climate, with considerable variations in temperature between its lowland and mountainous areas.

In the Chüy Valley, average January temperatures range from −5 to −15 °C, while average July temperatures range from 22 to 25 °C. The Suusamyr Valley has a considerably colder climate, with average temperatures of approximately −22 °C in January and 13 °C in July.

Annual precipitation ranges from 500 to 600 mm in the Chüy Valley and from 300 to 350 mm in the mountainous areas, according to the 2004 geographical encyclopedia.

== Flora and vegetation ==
Vegetation varies considerably with elevation and soil conditions. Mountain meadows and subalpine meadow-steppe vegetation occur on brown soils in the higher mountains and the Suusamyr Valley.

Riparian vegetation along rivers in mountain gorges includes willows, poplars, and shrub forests. Juniper grows on the northern slopes of the mountains.

== Demographics ==
=== Historical population ===
The population of Panfilov District declined from 50,582 in 1989 to 41,754 in 2009, before increasing to 48,879 at the 2022 census.

Historical population
Year	Pop.	±% p.a.
1970	43,894	—
1979	46,445	+0.63%
1989	50,582	+0.86%
1999	45,606	−1.03%
2009	41,754	−0.88%
2021	47,938	+1.16%
2022	48,879	+1.96%
2023	49,555	+1.38%
Resident population; 1970–2009 and 2022 census figures, 2021 and 2023 population estimates.

=== 2009 and 2022 censuses ===
According to the 2009 and 2022 population censuses, the resident (de jure) population of Panfilov District increased by 7,125 people, or 17.1%. The urban population increased from 7,526 to 10,006, while the rural population increased from 34,228 to 38,873.

Population by sex and place of residence
Population	2009	2022
Total	41,754	48,879
Male	20,789	24,684
Female	20,965	24,195
Urban	7,526	10,006
Rural	34,228	38,873

=== Ethnic composition ===
The ethnic composition of Panfilov District changed between the 2009 and 2022 censuses. The proportion of ethnic Kyrgyz increased from 68.8% to 80.8%, while that of ethnic Russians decreased from 17.8% to 11.0%.

Ethnic composition of Panfilov District
Ethnic group	2009		2022	
Ethnic group	Population	%	Population	%
Kyrgyz	28,736	68.8	39,513	80.8
Russians	7,418	17.8	5,385	11.0
Kazakhs	1,110	2.6	909	1.9
Ukrainians	878	2.1	138	0.3
Turks	787	1.9	546	1.1
Uzbeks	701	1.7	639	1.3
Tajiks	459	1.1	665	1.4
Germans	298	0.7	98	0.2
Uyghurs	261	0.6	245	0.5
Azerbaijanis	255	0.6	288	0.6
Tatars	234	0.6	127	0.3
Karachays	177	0.4	149	0.3
Others	440	1.1	177	0.4
Total	41,754	100.0	48,879	100.0

Note: The 2009 "Others" category includes 123 Kurds, who were listed separately in the original census table. Percentages are rounded and may not sum exactly to 100%.

== Rural communities and villages ==
In total, Panfilov District includes 1 city and 20 settlements divided into 4 rural communities (aiyl aymaqs):

- City of district significance:
  - Kayyngdy
- Rural communities:
  1. Orto-Kayyngdy rural community (seat: Voznesenovka; incl. Orto-Kayyrma, Erkin-Say, Telman, Bukara, and Kum-Aryk)
  2. Kürpüldök rural community (seat: Kirov; incl. Birinchi May, Ozernoye, Oktyabrskoye, Oyrondu, Kürpüldök, and Rovnoye)
  3. Kurama rural community (seat: Panfilov; incl. Jayylma, Orto-Aryk, and Efironos)
  4. Frunze rural community (seat: Chaldybar; incl. Cholok-Aryk and Chorgolu)
Settlements of the Panfilov District.
