= Voznesenovka =

Voznesenovka (Russian: Вознесеновка) is the name of several rural localities in Russia:

- Voznesenovka, Ivanovsky District, Amur Oblast, a selo in Ivanovsky Selsoviet of Ivanovsky District, Amur Oblast
- Voznesenovka, Romnensky District, Amur Oblast, a selo in Rogozovsky Selsoviet of Romnensky District, Amur Oblast
