= Bukara =

Village in Chüy Region, Kyrgyzstan

Bukara Kyrgyz: Букара
- Village
- Location within Kyrgyzstan
- Coordinates: 42.70237°N 73.78256°E
- Country: Kyrgyzstan
- Region: Chüy Region
- District: Panfilov District
- Rural community: Orto-Kayyngdy
- Founded: 1929
- Elevation: 1,016 m (3,333 ft)

Population (2022)
  - Total: 1,017
- Time zone: UTC+6

Bukara (Kyrgyz: Букара) is a village in Panfilov District of Chüy Region, Kyrgyzstan. It is part of the Orto-Kayyngdy rural community (ayyl aymak). Founded in 1929, its population was 1,017 at the 2022 census.

The village is listed in the 2025 state administrative-territorial classifier under SOATE code 41708 219 811 05 0.

== History ==
Bukara was founded in 1929.

== Geography ==
Bukara lies at an elevation of approximately 1,016 m above sea level. The village is approximately 21 km from Kayyngdy, the administrative centre of Panfilov District, and 21 km from the nearest railway station.

== Population ==
Bukara had 1,088 inhabitants in 2002, 1,082 at the 2009 census, and 1,017 at the 2022 census.

Historical population
| Year | Pop. | ±% p.a. |
|---|---|---|
| 2002 | 1,088 | — |
| 2009 | 1,082 | −0.08% |
| 2022 | 1,017 | −0.48% |
Sources: Geography of Kyrgyzstan (2004); 2009 and 2022 population censuses.
