= Sokuluk District =

Coordinates: 42.8526°N 74.221°E

Sokuluk District Сокулук району
- District
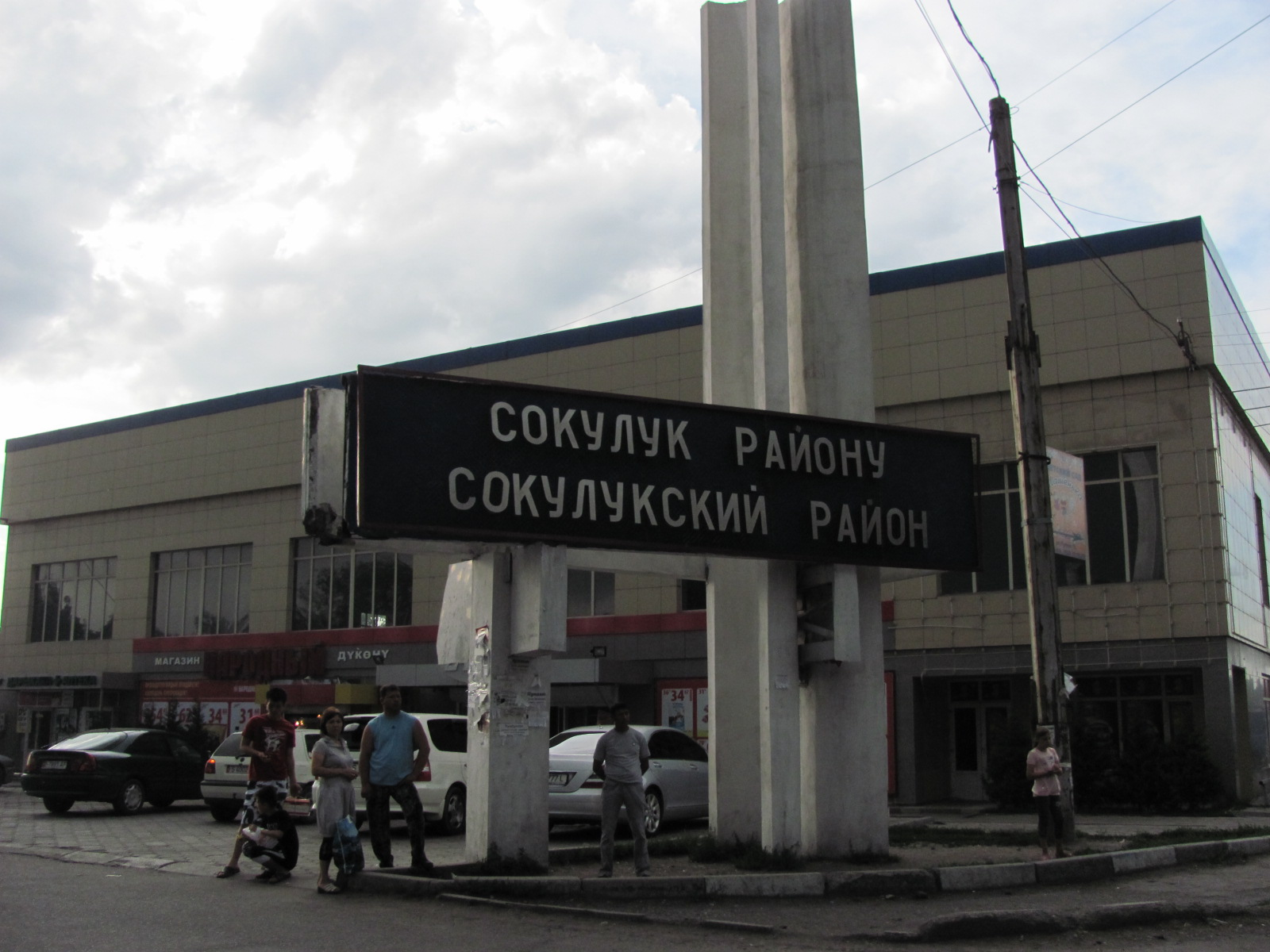
- The border to Sokuluk rayon from Alamüdün rayon along the Osh–Bishkek highway

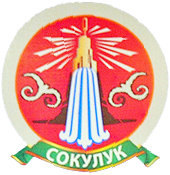
- Coat of arms

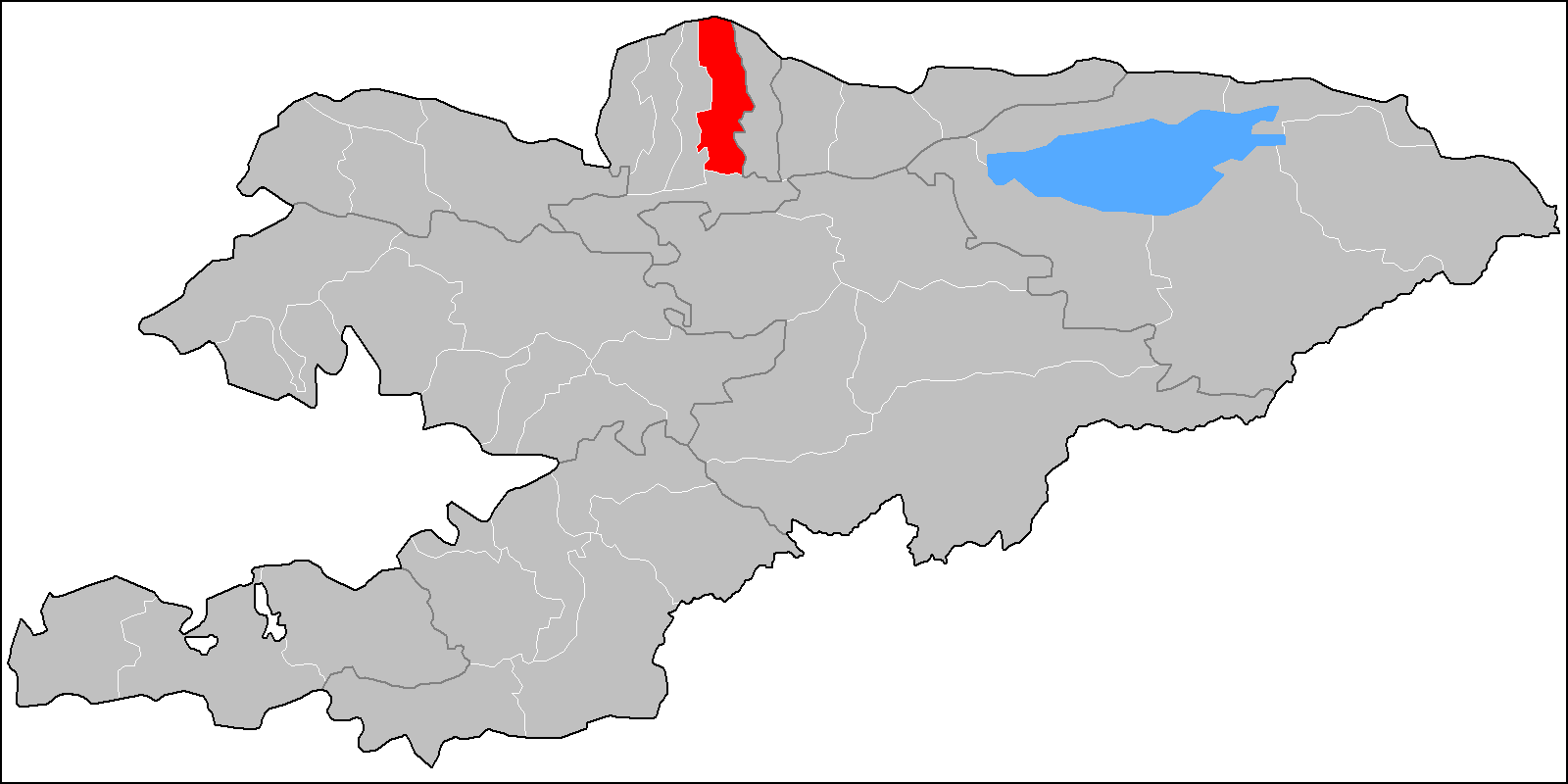
- Country: Kyrgyzstan
- Region: Chüy Region

Area
  - Total: 2,550 km^{2} (980 sq mi)

Population (2021)
  - Total: 194,579
  - Density: 76.3/km^{2} (198/sq mi)
- Time zone: UTC+6

Sokuluk (Kyrgyz: Сокулук району; Russian: Сокулукский район) is a district of the Chüy Region in northern Kyrgyzstan. Its area is 2,550 square kilometres (980 sq mi), and its resident population was 194,579 in 2021. The administrative seat lies at Sokuluk village.

== Geography ==
Sokuluk District is situated in the central part of the Chüy Valley, extending approximately 100 km from north to south and reaching 35–40 km in width. It borders Moskva District to the west, Alamüdün District and Bishkek to the east, and Kazakhstan to the north. To the south, it borders the Suusamyr Valley section of Panfilov District along the crest of the Kyrgyz Ala-Too Range.

The northern part of the district consists predominantly of plains, extending from the Chu River at approximately 560 m above sea level. The southern part is occupied by the foothills and mountains of the Kyrgyz Ala-Too, with elevations ranging from 1,100 to 3,000 m. The district includes the Sokuluk Gorge and deposits of construction materials.

=== Climate ===
The climate is continental, with average January temperatures ranging from −14.5 to −6.1 °C and July temperatures from 22 to 25 °C. Annual precipitation is approximately 450–500 mm.

=== Rivers ===
The district lies within the drainage basin of the Chu River. Its principal rivers include the Sokuluk and Jylamysh.

=== Soils and vegetation ===
The district's soils include grey soils, dark chestnut soils, and chernozems. Most of the lowland areas have been converted to agricultural land. Natural vegetation on the mountain slopes consists of steppe grasslands, mountain meadows, shrubs, juniper, and coniferous trees.

== Demographics ==
=== Historical population ===
The resident population of Sokuluk District increased from 131,923 in 1989 to 159,231 in 2009 and reached 257,959 at the 2022 census.

Historical population
Year	Pop.	±% p.a.
1970	104,508	—
1979	117,084	+1.27%
1989	131,923	+1.20%
1999	136,124	+0.31%
2009	159,231	+1.58%
2021	194,579	+1.68%
2022	257,959	+32.57%
Resident population; 1970–2009 and 2022 census figures. The 2021 figure is a population estimate.

=== 2009 and 2022 censuses ===
According to the 2009 and 2022 population censuses, the resident (de jure) population of Sokuluk District increased by 98,728 people, or 62.0%. The urban population increased from 8,749 to 10,018, while the rural population increased from 150,482 to 247,941.

Population by sex and place of residence
Population	2009	2022
Total	159,231	257,959
Male	78,557	128,888
Female	80,674	129,071
Urban	8,749	10,018
Rural	150,482	247,941

=== Ethnic composition ===
The ethnic composition of Sokuluk District changed considerably between the 2009 and 2022 censuses. The proportion of ethnic Kyrgyz increased from 62.6% to 83.1%, while that of ethnic Russians decreased from 20.5% to 9.5%.

Ethnic composition of Sokuluk District
Ethnic group	2009		2022	
Ethnic group	Population	%	Population	%
Kyrgyz	99,712	62.6	214,431	83.1
Russians	32,675	20.5	24,423	9.5
Kazakhs	4,339	2.7	3,358	1.3
Dungans	3,006	1.9	3,516	1.4
Turks	2,916	1.8	1,802	0.7
Azerbaijanis	2,299	1.4	1,516	0.6
Ukrainians	1,950	1.2	214	0.1
Uyghurs	1,712	1.1	1,292	0.5
Dargins	1,540	1.0	1,515	0.6
Lezgins	1,394	0.9	865	0.3
Germans	1,306	0.8	304	0.1
Uzbeks	1,114	0.7	1,030	0.4
Tatars	996	0.6	300	0.1
Kurds	860	0.5	909	0.4
Others	3,412	2.1	2,484	1.0
Total	159,231	100.0	257,959	100.0

Note: "Others" combines ethnic groups not individually shown in this summary, including Tajiks, Koreans and other smaller groups. Percentages are rounded and may not sum exactly to 100%.

== Rural communities and villages ==
In total, Sokuluk District includes 1 town and 68 settlements in 19 rural communities (ayyl aymagy). Each rural community includes one or several villages. The rural communities and settlements in the Sokuluk District are as follows:

1. town Shopokov
2. Asylbash (seat: Asylbash; incl. Kirov)
3. At-Bashy (seat: Manas; incl. Ak-Jol, Lesnoye and Tört-Köl)
4. Birinchi May (seat: Birinchi May; incl. Natsionalnoye and Panfilov)
5. Frunze (seat: Frunze; incl. Komsomol, Ozernoye and Studencheskoye)
6. Gavrilovka (seat: Gavrilovka; incl. Jangarach, Romanovka and Shalta)
7. Jangy-Jer (seat: Jangy-Jer; incl. Verkhnevostochnoye, Zapadnoye, Zelenoye and Nizhnevostochnoye)
8. Jangy-Pakhta (seat: Jangy-Pakhta; incl. Ak-Kashat, Zarya, May and Mirny)
9. Kamyshanovka (seat: Kamyshanovka)
10. Kaynazarova (seat: Chat-Köl; incl. Belek and Tüz)
11. Kojomkul (seat: Kojomkul)
12. Krupskaya (seat: Sokuluk; incl. Jakynky Aral, Alysky Aral and Birinchi May)
13. Kün-Tuu (seat: Kün-Tuu; incl. Dostuk, Kichi-Shalta, Shalta and Chong-Jar)
14. Kyzyl-Tuu (seat: Kyzyl-Tuu; incl. Kara-Sakal, Malovodnoye, Novoye and Tokbay)
15. Novopavlovka (seat: Novopavlovka; incl. Uchkun)
16. Orok (seat: Jal; incl. Jogorku Orok, Kaltar, Kashka-Bash, Tömönkü Orok, Plodovoye, Sarban and Selektsionnoye)
17. Saz (seat: Saz; incl. Konush)
18. Sokuluk (seat: Sokuluk)
19. Tömönkü Chüy (seat: Tömönkü Chüy; incl. Mirnoye, Sadovoye, Severnoye, Stepnoye and Taltak)
20. Tösh-Bulak (seat: Tösh-Bulak; incl. Börülü and Chetindi)
Map of the inhabited part of the Sokuluk District
