= Chorgolu =

Village in Chüy Region, Kyrgyzstan

Chorgolu Kyrgyz: Чорголу
- Village
- Location within Kyrgyzstan
- Coordinates: 42°44′06″N 73°36′22″E
- Country: Kyrgyzstan
- Region: Chüy Region
- District: Panfilov District
- Rural community: Frunze

Population (2022)
  - Total: 514
- Time zone: UTC+6

Chorgolu (Kyrgyz: Чорголу; also spelled Chorgolo) is a village in Panfilov District of Chüy Region, Kyrgyzstan. It is part of the Frunze rural community (ayyl aymak). Its population was 514 in 2022. The village is listed in the 2025 state administrative-territorial classifier under SOATE code 41708 219 827 03 0.

== Geography ==
Chorgolu is situated in the western part of Chüy Region, at the northern foothills of the Kyrgyz Ala-Too Range.

According to the Ministry of Emergency Situations of Kyrgyzstan, the village is potentially exposed to floods and mudflows associated with the Chorgoluu, Koktu-Bulak, and Taldy-Bulak watercourses, which may affect residential buildings, agricultural land, and local infrastructure.

== Notable events ==
On 3 May 2013, a United States Air Force KC-135R Stratotanker crashed in the mountains between Chorgolu and the nearby village of Cholok-Aryk, killing all three crew members. The aircraft had departed from the Transit Center at Manas on an aerial refuelling mission to Afghanistan.
