= Taltak =

Taltak Kyrgyz: Талтак
- Location within Kyrgyzstan
- Coordinates: 43°09′05″N 74°24′06″E
- Country: Kyrgyzstan
- Region: Chüy Region
- District: Sokuluk District
- Elevation: 587 m (1,926 ft)

Population (2021)
  - Total: 128

Taltak (Kyrgyz: Талтак) is a village in the Sokuluk District of Chüy Region of Kyrgyzstan. Its population was 128 in 2021.
