= Kürpüldök =

Village in Chüy Region, Kyrgyzstan

Kürpüldök Kyrgyz: Күрпүлдөк
- Village
- Location within Kyrgyzstan
- Coordinates: 42°54′06″N 73°35′38″E
- Country: Kyrgyzstan
- Region: Chüy Region
- District: Panfilov District
- Rural community: Kürpüldök
- Elevation: 680 m (2,230 ft)

Population (2022)
  - Total: 1,850
- Time zone: UTC+6

Kürpüldök (Kyrgyz: Күрпүлдөк; Russian: Кюрпюльдек) is a village in Panfilov District of Chüy Region, Kyrgyzstan. It is part of the Kürpüldök rural community (ayyl aymak). Its population was 1,850 in 2022. The village is listed in the 2025 state administrative-territorial classifier under SOATE code 41708 219 816 05 0.

== Geography ==
Kürpüldök is situated in the western part of the Chüy Valley, northwest of Kayyngdy, the administrative centre of Panfilov District. The village lies at an elevation of approximately 680 m above sea level.

== Etymology ==
According to local oral tradition, the village's name is associated with the sound of water bubbling from the ground in a marshy area covered with reeds. Other local accounts associate the name with sounds made by wild boars or wind passing through the reeds.

== Infrastructure ==
In November 2024, a rehabilitated drinking water supply system was commissioned in Kürpüldök under the Sustainable Rural Water Supply and Sanitation Development Project. The system included more than 9 km of water pipelines, upgraded water supply equipment, and disinfection facilities, providing improved access to drinking water for 1,961 residents.
