= Efironos, Kyrgyzstan =

Village in Chüy Region, Kyrgyzstan

Efironos Kyrgyz: Эфиронос
- Village
- Location within Kyrgyzstan
- Coordinates: 42°48′06″N 73°44′48″E
- Country: Kyrgyzstan
- Region: Chüy Region
- District: Panfilov District
- Rural community: Kurama

Population (2022)
  - Total: 714
- Time zone: UTC+6

Efironos (Kyrgyz: Эфиронос) is a village in Panfilov District, Chüy Region, Kyrgyzstan. It forms part of the Kurama rural community.

Efironos is one of four villages in the Kurama rural community, alongside Panfilov, Jayylma and Orto-Aryk. It lies approximately 7 kilometres (4.3 mi) from the district centre, Kayyngdy.

== History ==
The village takes its name from an enterprise that processed essential-oil crops, where many residents worked during the Soviet period. According to the Panfilov District State Archive's guide, the Kara-Balta Efironos state farm and factory was established in 1931. It operated as the Kara-Balta Essential Oil Factory from 1937 to 1967 and as the Efironos state farm from 1968 until its liquidation in 1987.

== Population ==
Historical population
Year	Pop.	±% p.a.
2002	746	—
2022	714	−0.22%
Sources: Кыргызстандын географиясы and the 2022 census.
