= Telman, Panfilov District =

Village in Chüy Region, Kyrgyzstan

Telman Kyrgyz: Тельман
- Village
- Location in Kyrgyzstan
- Coordinates: 42.7084°N 73.7566°E
- Country: Kyrgyzstan
- Region: Chüy Region
- District: Panfilov District
- Rural community: Orto-Kayyngdy

Population (2026)
  - Total: 1,933
- Time zone: UTC+06:00 (KGT)

Telman (Kyrgyz: Тельман), officially listed in Russian as им. Тельмана (Imeni Telmana), is a village in Panfilov District, Chüy Region, Kyrgyzstan. It is part of the Orto-Kayyngdy rural community, whose administrative centre is Voznesenovka. Its SOATE code is 41708 219 811 04 0.

== Geography ==
Telman lies in the Cholok Kaiyndy catchment in the western part of Chüy Region, near the village of Bukara.

== Population ==
Historical population
Year	Pop.
2009	1,445
2022	1,841
2026	1,933
Source: 2009 and 2022 censuses and rural administration data as of the beginning of 2026
