= Orto-Aryk, Panfilov =

Village in Chüy Region, Kyrgyzstan

Orto-Aryk Kyrgyz: Орто-Арык
- Village
- Location in Kyrgyzstan
- Coordinates: 42.74750°N 73.66954°E
- Country: Kyrgyzstan
- Region: Chüy Region
- District: Panfilov District
- Rural community: Kurama
- Elevation: 900 m (3,000 ft)

Population (2026)
  - Total: 1,062
- Time zone: UTC+6 (KGT)

Orto-Aryk (Kyrgyz: Орто-Арык) is a village in Panfilov District, Chüy Region, Kyrgyzstan. It is part of the Kurama rural community. Its population was 1,062 at the beginning of 2026.

== Geography ==
Orto-Aryk lies south of Panfilov and Kaindy, the district centre, at an elevation of approximately 900 m (3,000 ft). It is about 80 km (50 mi) from Bishkek. The village has used water from an irrigation canal supplied by the Jardy-Kayyngdy River.

== Population and administration ==
According to the National Statistical Committee, using figures supplied by local authorities, the village had a resident population of 1,062 at the beginning of 2026.

The 2025 national administrative classification lists Orto-Aryk as part of the Kurama rural community, whose administrative centre is Panfilov. Its SOATE code is 41708 219 822 03 0.

== Infrastructure ==
The village's piped water supply system was originally built in the 1960s and 1970s. A rehabilitation plan prepared in 2022 proposed a new borehole, water storage tanks and improvements to the distribution network.
