= Birinchi May, Panfilov =

Birinchi May Биринчи Май
- Location within Kyrgyzstan
- Coordinates: 42°56′41″N 73°38′18″E
- Country: Kyrgyzstan
- Region: Chüy
- District: Panfilov
- Elevation: 660 m (2,170 ft)

Population (2021)
  - Total: 1,722

Birinchi May (Kyrgyz: Биринчи Май, Russian: Первомайское, romanized: Pervomayskoye) is a village in the Chüy Region of Kyrgyzstan. It is part of the Panfilov District. Its population was 1,722 in 2021. It was established in 1933.
