= Alysky Aral =

Alysky Aral Алыскы Арал
- Location within Kyrgyzstan
- Coordinates: 42°54′N 74°15′E
- Country: Kyrgyzstan
- Region: Chüy
- District: Sokuluk
- Elevation: 678 m (2,224 ft)

Population (2021)
  - Total: 437

Alysky Aral (Kyrgyz: Алыскы Арал, Russian: Арал Дальный - Aral Dalny) is a village in the Chüy Region of Kyrgyzstan. It is part of the Sokuluk District. Its population was 437 in 2021.
