= Malovodnoye =

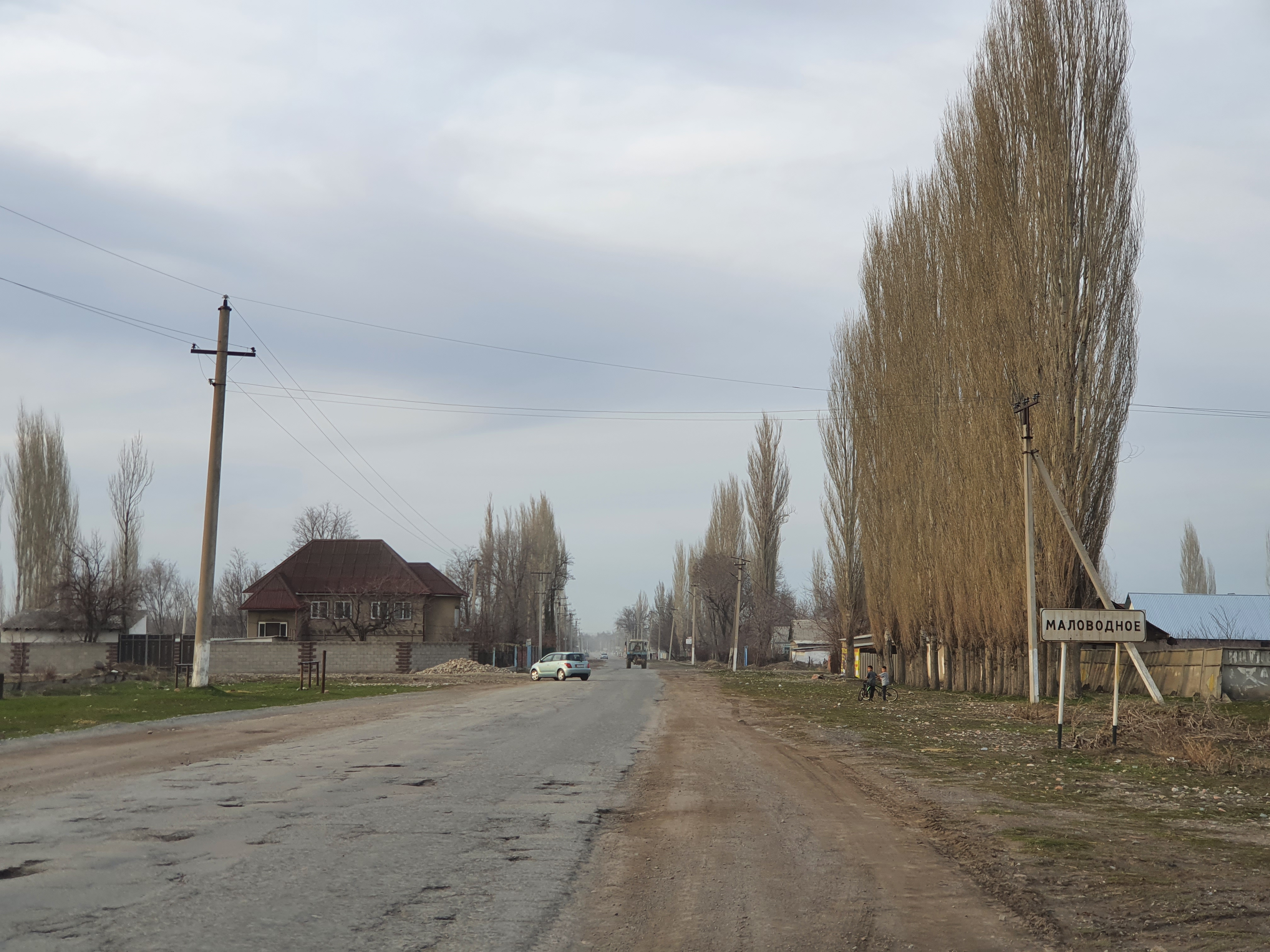

- Location within Kyrgyzstan
- Coordinates: 42°50′40″N 74°22′50″E
- Country: Kyrgyzstan
- Region: Chüy Region
- District: Sokuluk District
- Elevation: 766 m (2,513 ft)

Population (2021)
  - Total: 2,433

Malovodnoye is a village in the Chüy Region of Kyrgyzstan. Its population was 2,433 in 2021.
