= Jardy-Kayyngdy Game Reserve =

- IUCN category IV (habitat/species management area)
- Interactive map of Jardy-Kayyngdy Game Reserve
- Location: Kyrgyzstan
- Coordinates: 42°34′3.82″N 73°35′38.5″E
- Area: 8,700 hectares (21,000 acres)
- Established: 1976; 50 years ago

Jardy-Kayyngdy Game Reserve (Kyrgyz: Жарды-кайыңды заказниги) is a protected area in Panfilov District, Chüy Region, Kyrgyzstan. Established in 1976, it covers 8,700 hectares (21,000 acres).
