= Tömönkü Chüy =

Tömönkü Chüy Kyrgyz: Төмөнкү Чүй
- Location within Kyrgyzstan
- Coordinates: 43°11′26″N 74°20′55″E
- Country: Kyrgyzstan
- Region: Chüy Region
- District: Sokuluk District
- Elevation: 566 m (1,857 ft)

Population (2021)
  - Total: 2,733

Tömönkü Chüy (Kyrgyz: Төш-Булак) or Nizhne-Chuyskoe (Russian: Нижнечуйское) is a village in the Sokuluk District of Chüy Region of Kyrgyzstan. Its population was 2,733 in 2021.
