= Joon-Aryk =

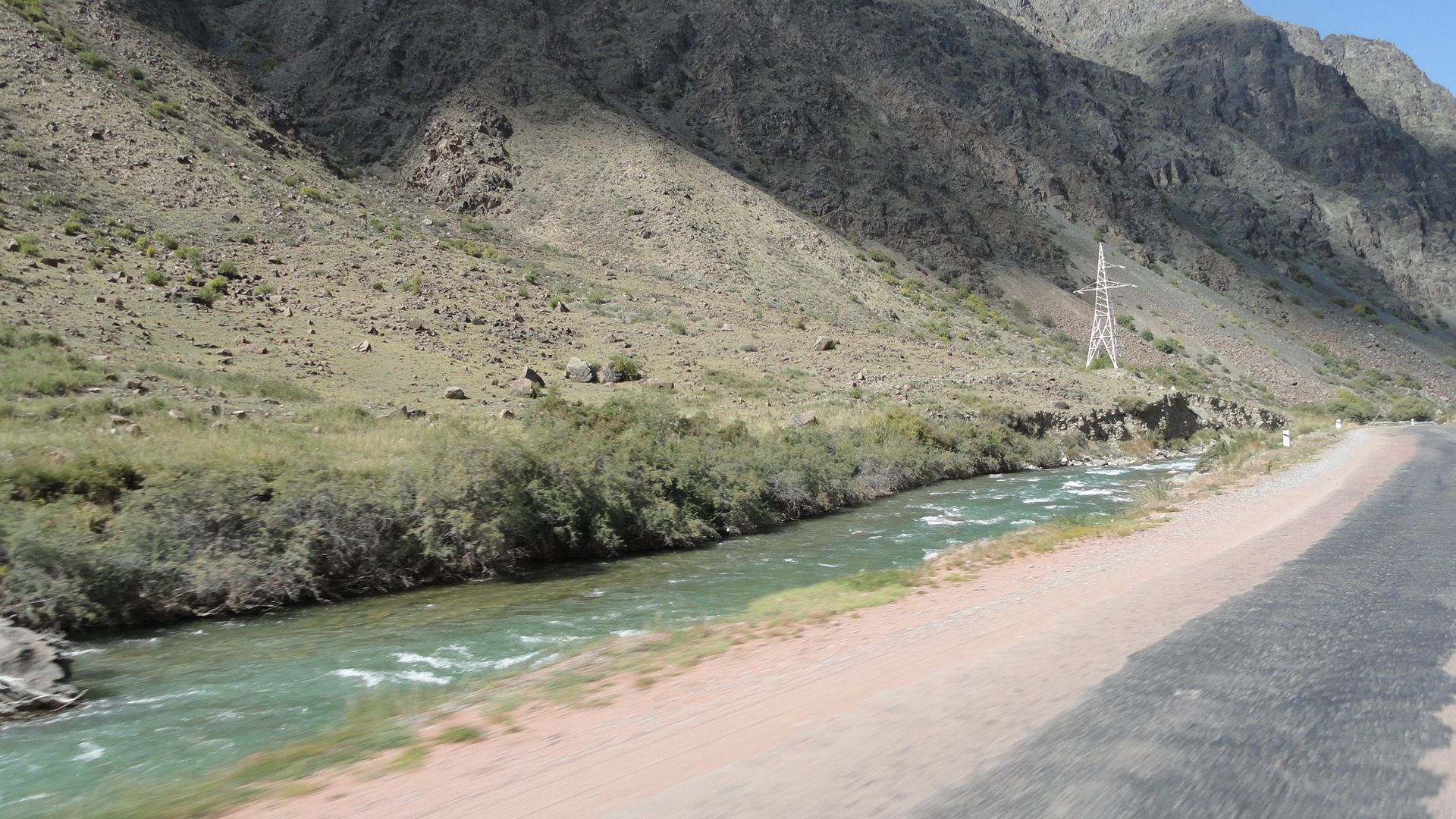
- Native name: Жоон-Арык (Kyrgyz)

Location
- Country: Kyrgyzstan
- Region: Naryn Region
- District: Kochkor District

Physical characteristics
- Source: confluence of Kara-Kujur and Telek
- Mouth: Chu
  - coordinates: 42°13′15.60″N 75°44′29″E
  - elevation: 1,802 m (5,912 ft)
- Length: 34.8 km (21.6 mi)
- Basin size: 1,340 km^{2} (520 sq mi)

Basin features
- Progression: Chu→ Betpak-Dala desert

The Joon-Aryk (Kyrgyz: Жоон-Арык) is a river in Kochkor District of Naryn Region of Kyrgyzstan. It is formed by confluence of Kara-Kujur and Telek rivers. It is 34.8 kilometres (21.6 mi) long, and has a drainage basin of 1,340 square kilometres (520 sq mi). Its average annual discharge is 11.4 cubic meters per second. The Chu is formed by the confluence of Kochkor and Joon Aryk near the village Kochkor.
