= Boom Gorge =

Gorge in Kyrgyzstan

Coordinates: 42°35′N 75°48′E

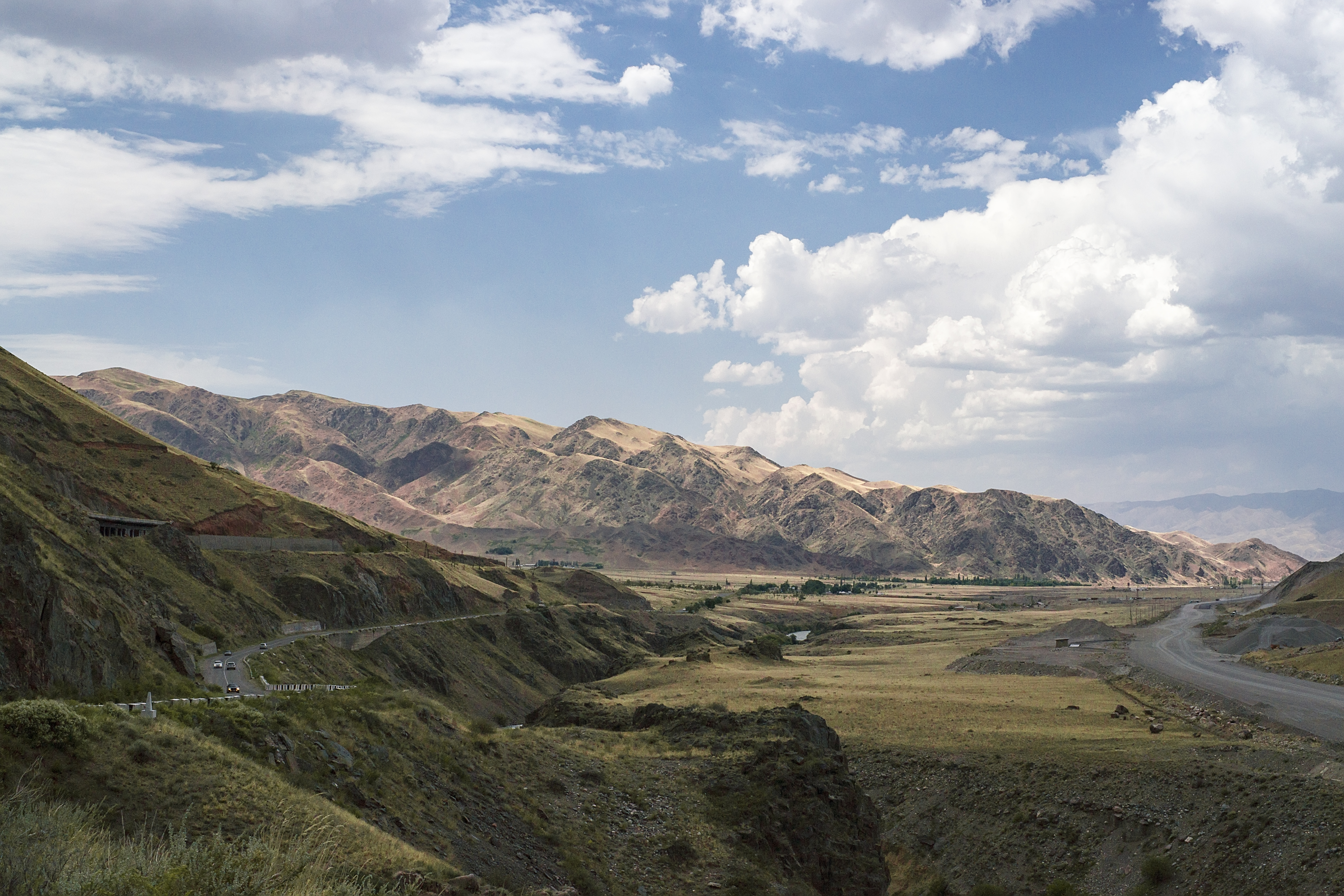
Boom Gorge

Boom Gorge (Kyrgyz: Боом капчыгайы, romanized: Boom kapchygayy, lit. 'shoestring gorge', Russian: Боо́мское уще́лье) is a river gorge in Chüy Region and Issyk-Kul Region of Kyrgyzstan.

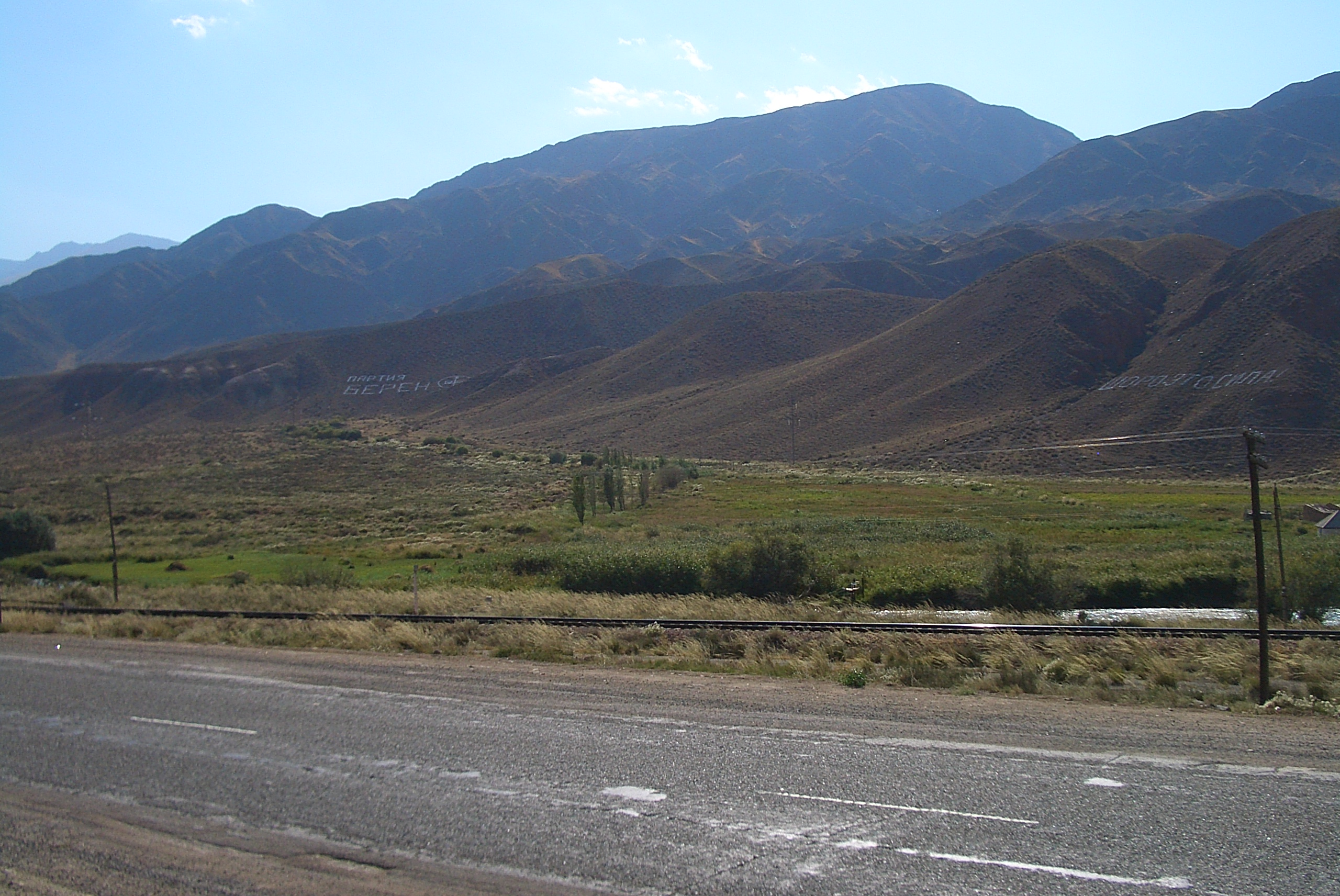
The Boom Gorge Mountains

The gorge cuts, in a general north–south direction, across one of Tian Shan's mountain range systems. The range east of the gorge is known as Kyungey Ala-Too (Russian: Кюнгей Ала-Тоо, based on similar Kyrgyz spelling), the one to the west is the Kyrgyz Ala-Too (Russian: Кыргиызский хребет).

The river Chu passes northwards through it and then enters the wider Chüy Valley. The Bishkek-Tokmak-Kemin-Balykchy highway (A365) passes through the gorge, as does the railway from Bishkek to Balykchy.
