= Selektsionnoye =

Selektsionnoye Селекционное
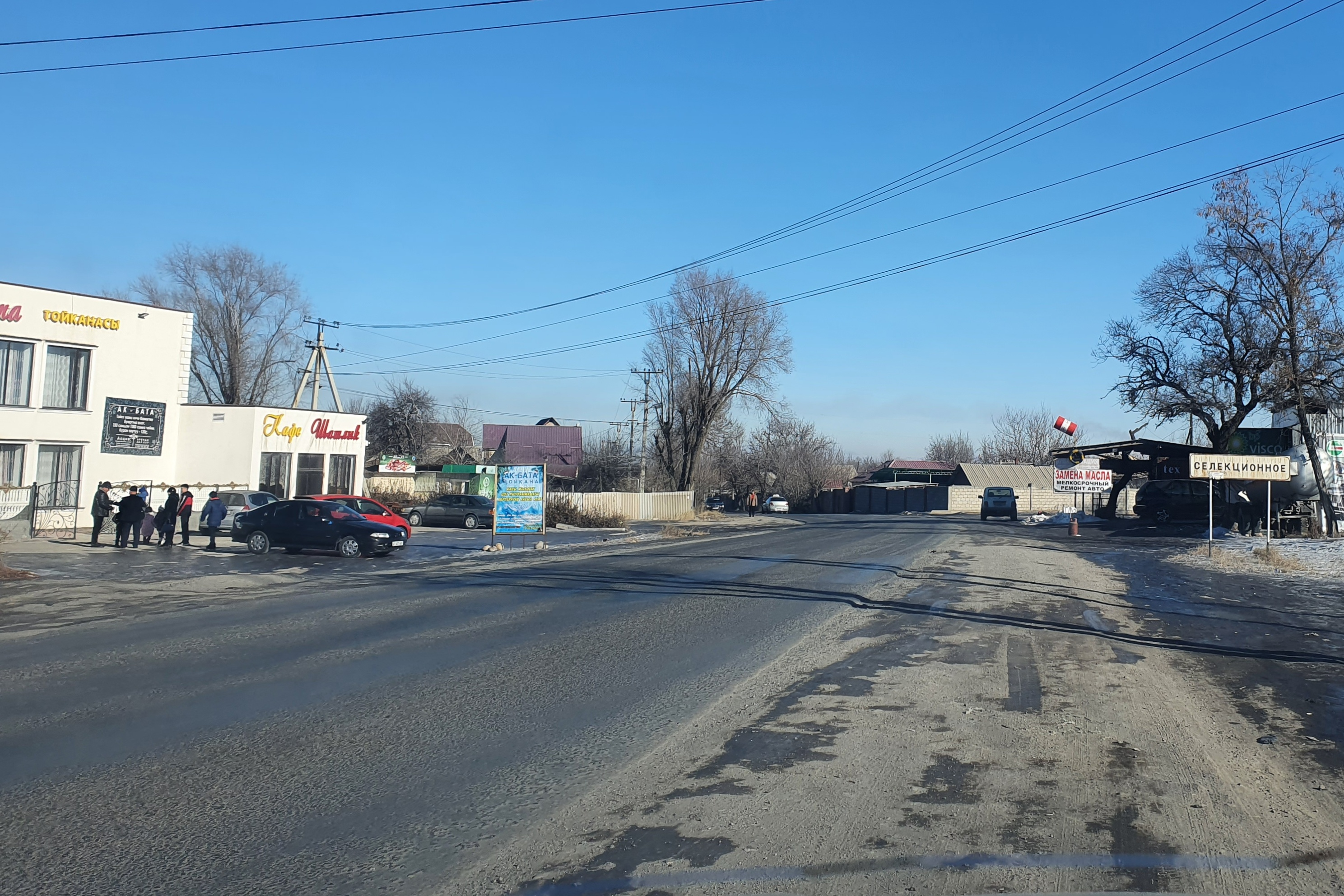

- Location within Kyrgyzstan
- Coordinates: 42°50′05″N 74°31′24″E
- Country: Kyrgyzstan
- Region: Chüy
- District: Sokuluk
- Elevation: 825 m (2,707 ft)

Population (2021)
  - Total: 2,988

Selektsionnoye is a village in the Chüy Region of Kyrgyzstan. It is part of the Sokuluk District. Its population was 2,988 in 2021.
