= Jangy-Jer, Chüy =

Jangy-Jer Kyrgyz: Жаңы-Жер
- Location within Kyrgyzstan
- Coordinates: 43°06′30″N 74°23′00″E
- Country: Kyrgyzstan
- Region: Chüy
- District: Sokuluk

Population (2021)
  - Total: 6,128
- Time zone: UTC+6

Jangy-Jer (Kyrgyz: Жаңы-Жер) is a village in Chüy Region of Kyrgyzstan. It is part of the Sokuluk District. Its population was 6,128 in 2021.

== Population ==
Historical population
Year	Pop.	±% p.a.
2009	5,979	—
2021	6,128	+0.21%
Note: resident population; Sources:
