= Kochkor (river) =

- Native name: Кочкор (Kyrgyz)

Location
- Country: Kyrgyzstan
- Region: Naryn Province
- District: Kochkor District

Physical characteristics
- Source: confluence of East Karakol River and Seok River
  - location: Kochkor District, Naryn Province, Kyrgyzstan
  - coordinates: 42°12′03″N 75°15′03″E
  - elevation: 2,200 m (7,200 ft)
- Mouth: Chu
  - location: Kochkor District, Naryn Province, Kyrgyzstan
  - coordinates: 42°13′15.60″N 75°44′29″E
  - elevation: 1,802 m (5,912 ft)
- Length: 45 km (28 mi)
- Basin size: 2,590 km^{2} (1,000 sq mi)

Basin features
- Progression: Chu→ Betpak-Dala desert

The Kochkor (Kyrgyz: Кочкор) is a river in Kochkor District of Naryn Province of Kyrgyzstan. It is formed by confluence of Karakol and Seok rivers. The river is 45 kilometres (28 mi) long, the basin area 2,590 square kilometres (1,000 mi^{2}), and the average annual discharge 12.6 cubic metres per second (440 cu ft/s). The Chu is formed by the confluence of Kochkor and Joon Aryk near the village Kochkor.
