= Romanovka, Kyrgyzstan =

Romanovka Романовка
- Location within Kyrgyzstan
- Coordinates: 42°51′36″N 74°19′48″E
- Country: Kyrgyzstan
- Region: Chüy Region
- District: Sokuluk District
- Elevation: 731 m (2,398 ft)

Population (2021)
  - Total: 3,185

Romanovka is a village in the Chüy Region of Kyrgyzstan. Its population was 3,185 in 2021.
