= Shalta =

Шалта Шалта
- Location within Kyrgyzstan
- Coordinates: 42°50′19″N 74°20′08″E
- Country: Kyrgyzstan
- Region: Chüy Region
- District: Sokuluk District
- Elevation: 775 m (2,543 ft)

Population (2021)
  - Total: 1,638

Shalta (Kyrgyz: Шалта) is a village in the Sokuluk District of Chüy Region of Kyrgyzstan. Its population was 1,638 in 2021. Among notable people born in Shalta are Dyuishenkul Shopokov (1915-1941), Hero of the Soviet Union, Sarybay Kudaybergenov (1925-1982), Linguist, Doctor of Philology, and Orozbek Kutmataliev (1932), Akyn, People's Artist of Kyrgyz Republic.
