= Sokuluk =

Sokuluk Сокулук
- Interactive map of Sokuluk
- Location within Kyrgyzstan
- Coordinates: 42°51′36″N 74°18′0″E
- Country: Kyrgyzstan
- Region: Chüy Region
- District: Sokuluk District
- Elevation: 728 m (2,388 ft)

Population (2021)
  - Total: 30,540
- Time zone: UTC+6

Sokuluk (Dungan: Сохўлў, Sohwlw; Kyrgyz, Russian: Сокулук) is a large village in the Chüy Region of Kyrgyzstan. Divided over two rural communities, its total population was 30,540 in 2021.

Sokuluk is the administrative center of Sokuluk District, and is located about 5km west from the town of Shopokov, the main economic center of the area.

== Population ==
Historical population
Year	Pop.	±% p.a.
2009	24,417	—
2021	30,540	+1.88%
Note: resident population; Sources:

== History ==
According to historians, Sokuluk started its existence in the early 1880s, as a place of settlement of many of the Dungan people who moved to the Russian Empire from the Kulja (Yining) area between 1881 and 1883, after Russia agreed to withdraw its troops from Kulja pursuant to the Treaty of Saint Petersburg (1881).

Sokuluk is the birthplace of the Dungan poet, writer, and educator Iasyr Shivaza (1906-1988).
