= Ak-Jol, Chüy =

Ak-Jol
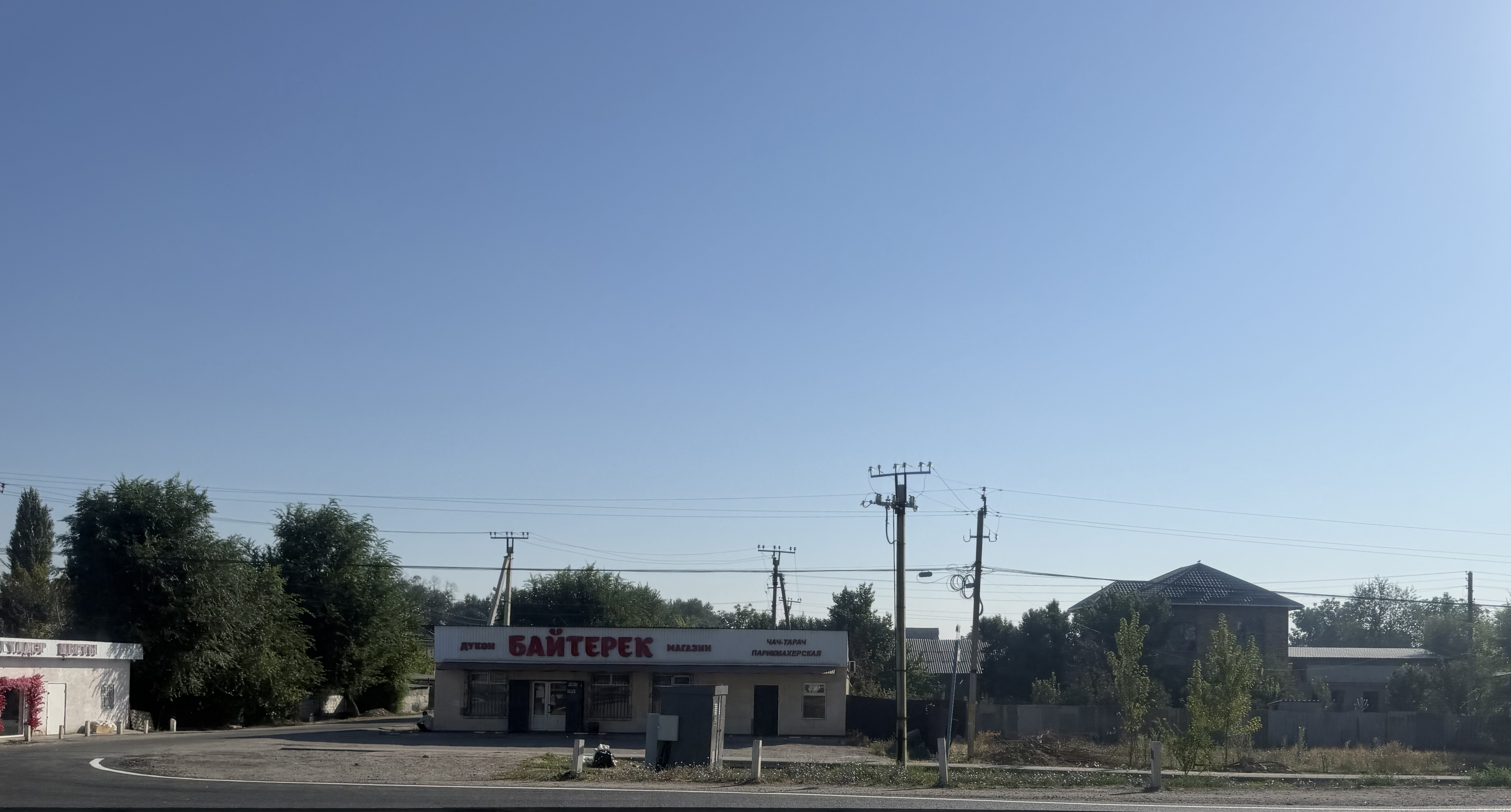

- Location within Kyrgyzstan
- Coordinates: 42°56′34″N 74°29′10″E
- Country: Kyrgyzstan
- Region: Chüy Region
- District: Sokuluk District
- Elevation: 690 m (2,260 ft)

Population (2021)
  - Total: 3,358
- Time zone: UTC+6

Ak-Jol is a village in the Sokuluk District of Chüy Region of Kyrgyzstan. Its population was 3,358 in 2021.
