= Voznesenovka, Kyrgyzstan =

Village in Chüy Region, Kyrgyzstan

Voznesenovka Kyrgyz: Вознесеновка
- Village
- Location within Kyrgyzstan
- Coordinates: 42°49′07″N 73°47′11″E
- Country: Kyrgyzstan
- Region: Chüy Region
- District: Panfilov District
- Rural community: Orto-Kayyngdy
- Founded: 1875

Population (2022)
  - Total: 4,186
- Time zone: UTC+6

Voznesenovka (Kyrgyz: Вознесеновка) is a village in Panfilov District, Chüy Region, Kyrgyzstan. It is the administrative centre of the Orto-Kayyngdy rural community.

== Geography ==
The village lies along the Bishkek–Tashkent highway, 11 kilometres (6.8 mi) from Kara-Balta railway station.

== History ==
Voznesenovka was founded in 1875.

The Voznesenovka village council was established in 1919. It initially belonged to the Kara-Balta volost of Pishpek uyezd in Semirechye Oblast.

In 2024, the Voznesenovka and Ortoev rural communities were merged to form the Orto-Kayyngdy rural community. Voznesenovka is listed as its administrative centre in the national classification of territorial units.

== Population ==
Historical population
Year	Pop.	±% p.a.
1993	3,989	—
2002	3,896	−0.26%
2022	4,186	+0.36%
Sources: 1993, 2002, and the 2022 census.
