= Cholok-Aryk =

Village in Chüy Region, Kyrgyzstan

Cholok-Aryk Kyrgyz: Чолок-Арык
- Village
- Location within Kyrgyzstan
- Coordinates: 42°45′04″N 73°29′56″E
- Country: Kyrgyzstan
- Region: Chüy Region
- District: Panfilov District
- Rural community: Frunze

Population (2022)
  - Total: 358
- Time zone: UTC+6

Cholok-Aryk (Kyrgyz: Чолок-Арык) is a village in Panfilov District of Chüy Region, Kyrgyzstan. It is part of the Frunze rural community (ayyl aymak). Its population was 358 in 2022. The village is listed in the 2025 state administrative-territorial classifier under SOATE code 41708 219 827 02 0.

== Geography ==
Cholok-Aryk is situated in the western part of Chüy Region, at the northern foothills of the Kyrgyz Ala-Too Range, near the border with Kazakhstan. It lies southwest of Kayyngdy, the administrative centre of Panfilov District. The village is located in the basin of the transboundary Aspara River. Livestock farming is an important local economic activity.

== History ==
According to local oral tradition, the village's name is associated with irrigation canals, particularly a canal that was left unfinished. Other local accounts offer different explanations for the name.

The village was the birthplace of Osmonkul Aliyev (1903–1938), a Kyrgyz political figure and the first editor of Erkin-Too, the first Kyrgyz-language newspaper.

== Population ==
Historical population
| Year | Pop. | ±% p.a. |
|---|---|---|
| 2009 | 259 | — |
| 2012 | 246 | −1.70% |
| 2022 | 358 | +3.82% |
Sources: Aspara River Basin Study (2009–2012); National Population Census (2022)
