= Chat-Köl =

Chat-Köl Чат-Көл
- Location within Kyrgyzstan
- Coordinates: 42°55′48″N 74°21′0″E
- Country: Kyrgyzstan
- Region: Chüy Region
- District: Sokuluk District
- Established: 1926
- Elevation: 686 m (2,251 ft)

Population (2021)
  - Total: 3,414

Chat-Köl (Kyrgyz: Чат-Көл) is a village in the Chüy Region of Kyrgyzstan. Its population was 3,414 in 2021. The village was established by migrants from northern Kazakhstan and Siberia in 1926, who settled down in a steppe among swampy areas with reeds.
