= Rovnoye, Kyrgyzstan =

Rovnoye Ровное
- Location within Kyrgyzstan
- Coordinates: 42°53′39″N 73°31′43″E
- Country: Kyrgyzstan
- Region: Chüy Region
- District: Panfilov District
- Elevation: 674 m (2,211 ft)

Population (2021)
  - Total: 801

Rovnoye is a village in the Panfilov District of Chüy Region of Kyrgyzstan. Its population was 801 in 2021.
