= Tösh-Bulak =

Tösh-Bulak Kyrgyz: Төш-Булак
- Location within Kyrgyzstan
- Coordinates: 42°41′00″N 74°14′27″E
- Country: Kyrgyzstan
- Region: Chüy Region
- District: Sokuluk District
- Established: 1912
- Elevation: 1,265 m (4,150 ft)

Population (2021)
  - Total: 2,479

Tösh-Bulak (Kyrgyz: Төш-Булак) is a village in the Sokuluk District of Chüy Region of Kyrgyzstan. Its population was 2,479 in 2021. It was known as Belogorka until 1992.

== Notable people ==
- Temir Sariyev (born 1963), a Kyrgyz politician who was Prime Minister of Kyrgyzstan from 2015 to 2016.

== Diplomatic missions ==
- Consulate of the Kingdom of Spain.
