= Jylamysh =

River in northern

- The Jylamysh in its mountain gorge
- Native name: Жыламыш (Kyrgyz)

Location
- Country: Kyrgyzstan
- Region: Chüy Region
- District: Sokuluk District

Physical characteristics
- Source
  - location: Northern slopes of the Kyrgyz Ala-Too
- Mouth
  - location: Diverted for irrigation before reaching the Chüy
- Length: 28 km (17 mi)
- Basin size: 186 km^{2} (72 sq mi)
- Discharge
  - average: 1.28 m^{3}/s (45 cu ft/s)

The Jylamysh (Kyrgyz: Жыламыш) is a river in Sokuluk District of Chüy Region, northern Kyrgyzstan. It rises on the northern slopes of the Kyrgyz Ala-Too and is diverted for irrigation before reaching the Chüy. It is 28 kilometres (17 mi) long and drains a basin of 186 square kilometres (72 sq mi).

== Course and hydrology ==
In its upper reaches, the river flows rapidly through a narrow gorge. As it emerges from the mountains, its valley widens and the river divides into several channels. Its basin contains three lakes with a combined area of 0.05 square kilometres (5.0 ha). The mean annual discharge is 1.28 cubic metres per second (45 cu ft/s). Water levels begin to rise in May and recede in September.

The river is used for irrigation. The villages of Jylamysh, Belek and Kyzyl-Tuu lie along its banks.
