= Voznesenovka, Romnensky District, Amur Oblast =

Voznesenovka Вознесеновка
- Selo
- Location within Amur Oblast Location within Russia
- Coordinates: 50°36′N 128°41′E
- Country: Russia
- Region: Amur Oblast
- District: Romnensky District
- Time zone: UTC+9:00

Voznesenovka (Russian: Вознесеновка) is a rural locality (a selo) in Rogozovsky Selsoviet of Romnensky District, Amur Oblast, Russia. The population was 87 as of 2018. There are 3 streets.

== Geography ==
Voznesenovka is located on the left bank of the Belaya River, 54 km southwest of Romny (the district's administrative centre) by road. Klimovka is the nearest rural locality.
