= Kojomkul =

Kojomkul Кожомкул
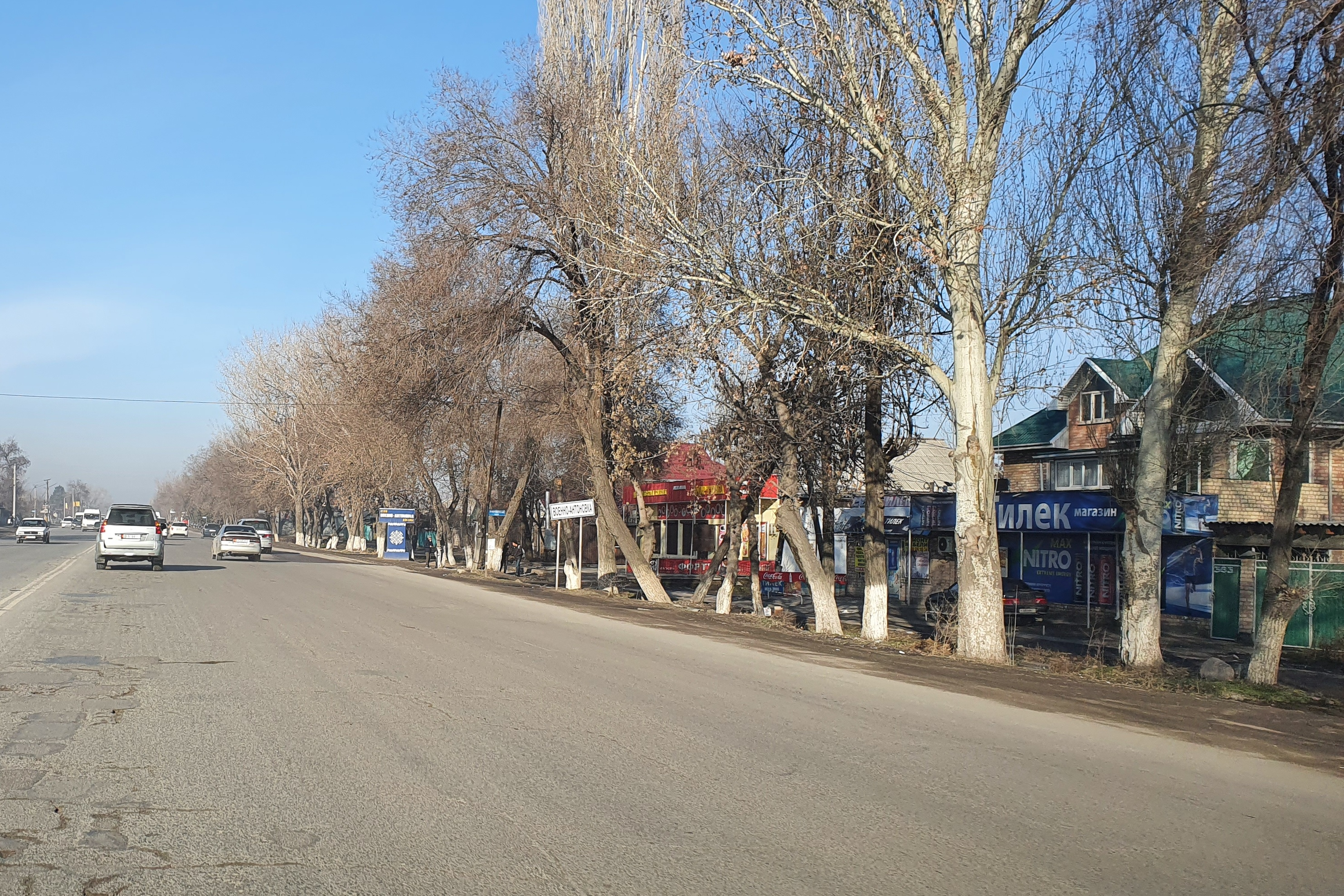

- Location within Kyrgyzstan
- Coordinates: 42°52′20″N 74°27′0″E
- Country: Kyrgyzstan
- Region: Chüy Region
- District: Sokuluk District
- Elevation: 734 m (2,408 ft)

Population (2021)
  - Total: 20,182
- Time zone: UTC+6 (KGT)

Kojomkul (Kyrgyz: Кожомкул), before 2025 Voyenno-Antonovka, is a large village in the Chüy Region of Kyrgyzstan. Its population was 20,182 in 2021.

== Population ==
Historical population
Year	Pop.	±% p.a.
2009	11,356	—
2021	20,182	+4.91%
Note: resident population; Sources:
