= Jer-Kazar =

Jer-Kazar Жер-Казар
- Location within Kyrgyzstan
- Coordinates: 42°56′35.52″N 74°43′37.16″E
- Country: Kyrgyzstan
- Region: Chüy Region
- District: Ysyk-Ata District
- Elevation: 673 m (2,208 ft)

Population (2021)
  - Total: 2,021

Jer-Kazar (Kyrgyz: Жер-Казар) is a village in the Ysyk-Ata District of Chüy Region of Kyrgyzstan established in 1928. Its population was 2,021 in 2021.
