= Kyzyl-Tuu, Sokuluk =

Kyzyl-Tuu Kyrgyz: Кызыл-Туу
- Location within Kyrgyzstan
- Coordinates: 42°48′26″N 74°22′30″E
- Country: Kyrgyzstan
- Region: Chüy Region
- District: Sokuluk District
- Elevation: 830 m (2,720 ft)

Population (2021)
  - Total: 4,536

Kyzyl-Tuu (Kyrgyz: Кызыл-Туу) is a village in the Sokuluk District of Chüy Region of Kyrgyzstan established in 1930. Kyzyl-Tuu is located at the right bank of Jylamysh River. Its population was 4536 in 2021.
