= Voznesenovka, Ivanovsky District, Amur Oblast =

Voznesenovka Вознесеновка
- Selo
- Location within Amur Oblast Location within Russia
- Coordinates: 50°15′N 128°00′E
- Country: Russia
- Region: Amur Oblast
- District: Ivanovsky District
- Time zone: UTC+9:00

Voznesenovka (Russian: Вознесеновка) is a rural locality (a selo) in Ivanovsky Selsoviet of Ivanovsky District, Amur Oblast, Russia. The population was 5 as of 2018. There are 2 streets.

== Geography ==
Voznesenovka is located 18 km south of Ivanovka (the district's administrative centre) by road. Kreshchenova is the nearest rural locality.
