= Panfilov, Kyrgyzstan =

Panfilov Панфилов
- Location within Kyrgyzstan
- Coordinates: 42°47′30″N 73°40′40″E
- Country: Kyrgyzstan
- Region: Chüy
- District: Panfilov

Population (2021)
  - Total: 8,636
- Time zone: UTC+6

Panfilov (Kyrgyz: Панфилов, Russian: Панфиловское, romanized: Panfilovskoye) is a village in Chüy Region of Kyrgyzstan. It is part of the Panfilov District. Its population was 8,636 in 2021.

== Population ==
Historical population
Year	Pop.	±% p.a.
2009	7,762	—
2021	8,636	+0.89%
Note: resident population; Sources:
