= Shopokov =

Shopokov Шопоков
- Seal

- Location within Kyrgyzstan
- Coordinates: 42°50′24″N 74°18′36″E
- Country: Kyrgyzstan
- Region: Chüy Region
- District: Sokuluk District

Population (2021)
  - Total: 10,289

Shopokov (Kyrgyz: Шопоков; Russian: Шопоков, romanized: Shopokov) is a town in the Chüy Region of Kyrgyzstan. Its population was 10,289 in 2021. Shopokov is a city of district significance within Sokuluk District.

According to a report by the local authorities (undated, but published some time between 2003 and 2009), the town's population was 9,150. Major ethnic groups were Russians (4906), Kyrgyz (2704), Ukrainians (752), and Germans (296).

== History ==
The predecessor of today's Shopokov City was an urban-type settlement named Krasnooktyabrsky (Краснооктябрьский, i.e. "Red October"), established in 1939 along with the construction of a sugar mill. Shopokov was incorporated as a town (город) and received its present name on February 25, 1985.

The town is named after Düyshönkul Shopokov, one of the 28 soldiers of Ivan Panfilov's Division who were reported to die heroically on November 16, 1941, while defending Moscow.

== Population ==
Historical population
Year	Pop.	±% p.a.
1970	8,670	—
1979	9,483	+1.00%
1989	9,708	+0.23%
1999	9,133	−0.61%
2009	8,749	−0.43%
2021	10,289	+1.36%
Note: resident population; Sources:

== Economy ==
After the dissolution of the Soviet Union, the sugar mill has been privatized, and is still in operation. Local industries also manufacture a variety of equipment for food-processing industry.
