= Chu (river) =

River in Kyrgyzstan and Kazakhstan

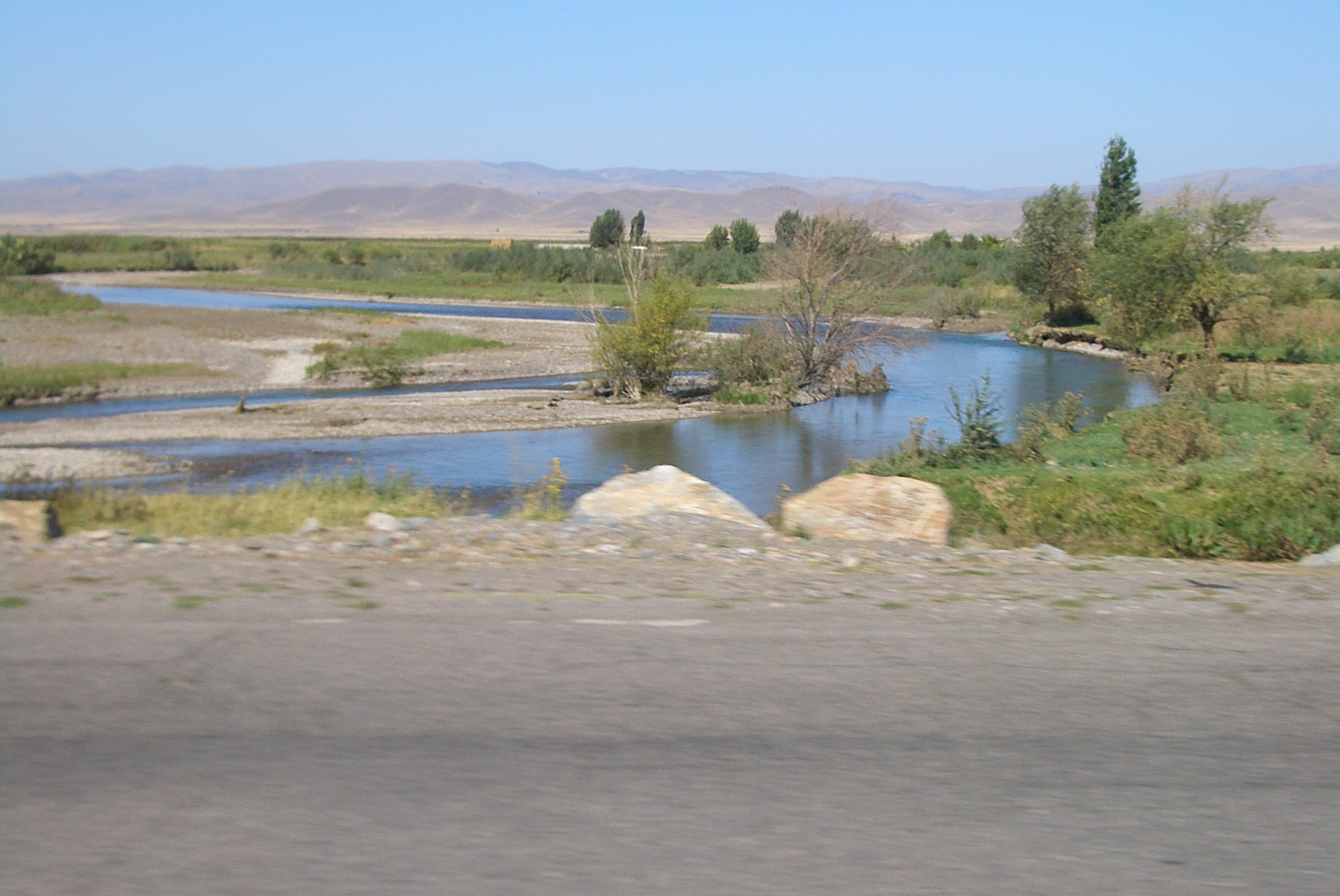
- In the Chüy Valley below Tokmok

- Location within Kazakhstan Location within Kyrgyzstan
- Native name: Шу (Kazakh); Чүй (Kyrgyz); Чу (Russian)

Location
- Country: Kyrgyzstan, Kazakhstan

Physical characteristics
- Source: Confluence of Joon Aryk and Kochkor
  - location: Kochkor District, Naryn Region, Kyrgyzstan
  - coordinates: 42°13′15.60″N 75°44′29″E
  - elevation: 1,802 m (5,912 ft)
- Mouth: Ashchykol Depression
  - location: Turkistan Region, Kazakhstan
  - coordinates: 44°59′N 67°43′E
  - elevation: 135 m (443 ft)
- Length: 1,067 km (663 mi)
- Basin size: 62,500 km^{2} (24,100 sq mi)

Basin features
- Tributaries
  - left: Ysyk-Ata, Alamüdün, Ala-Archa, Ak-Suu
  - right: Chong-Kemin, Kichi-Kemin

The Chu (Note: Kazakh: Шу, romanized: Şu; Kyrgyz: Чүй, romanized: Chüi; Dungan: Чў (from 楚 Chǔ); Russian: Чу) is a river in northern Kyrgyzstan and southern Kazakhstan. Of its total length of 1,067 kilometres (663 mi), the first 115 kilometres are in Kyrgyzstan, then for 221 kilometres the river serves as the border between Kyrgyzstan and Kazakhstan and the last 731 kilometres are in Kazakhstan. It is one of the longest rivers in Kyrgyzstan and in Kazakhstan. It has a drainage basin of 62,500 square kilometres (24,100 sq mi).

The Chüy Region, the northernmost and most populous administrative region of Kyrgyzstan, is named after the river; so are Chüy Avenue, the main street of the Kyrgyz capital of Bishkek and the city of Shu in Kazakhstan's Jambyl Region.

== Course ==
The Chu is formed by the confluence of the rivers Joon Aryk and Kochkor, in the Kochkor District of the Naryn Region, at an elevation of about 1,802 m (5,912 ft).. In its upper course, the river cuts through the Arsy and Karakoo mountains and the Orto-Tokoy massif, forming a series of narrow gorges. After approaching within a few kilometres of Lake Issyk-Kul (near Balykchy), without either flowing into the lake or draining it, it turns towards the northwest. In the 1950s an old riverbed called Ketmaldy (also Buugan) linked the Chu River and Issyk Kul. During floods part of the water of the Chu would reach the lake, but such outflow has not been seen since the construction of the Orto-Tokoy Reservoir.

Between Karajylga, at an elevation of about 1,600 m (5,200 ft), and Taigaktash, the river flows for about 22 km (14 mi) through the Boom Gorge (Russian: Боомское ущелье, Boomskoye ushchelye), within which lie the Kyrgyz capital Bishkek and the Kazakh city of Shu. In this section its channel narrows to about 15 to 20 m (49 to 66 ft), while the canyon reaches a depth of 60 to 70 m (200 to 230 ft). After the Chong-Kemin joins the Chu at an elevation of about 1,287 m (4,222 ft), the river emerges into the Chüy Valley, changing from a fast-flowing mountain river to a broad lowland river. Much of the Chu's water is diverted into a network of canals, such as the Great Chüy Canal, to irrigate the fertile black soils of the Chüy Valley for farming, on both the Kyrgyz and Kazakh sides of the river.

As the Chu flows through the Chüy Valley, it forms the border between Kyrgyzstan and Kazakhstan for more than a hundred kilometres, then it leaves Kyrgyzstan and flows into Kazakhstan, where it flows at the northern edge of the Moiynkum Desert, with Lake Kokuydynkol close to its channel. In wet years it may reach the endorheic salt lake Akzhaykyn, located among the vast solonchaks of the Ashchykol Depression.

== Hydrology ==
The mountainous part of the basin is the principal runoff-forming area of the Chu. About 54% of its runoff in Kyrgyzstan originates at elevations above 3,300 m (10,800 ft). As the river and its tributaries descend onto the plains, they flow across permeable Quaternary and modern alluvial deposits, where substantial losses occur through infiltration and evaporation. Some of the infiltrated water subsequently returns to the surface through groundwater-fed streams locally known as karasuu.

Many tributaries crossing the Chüy Valley are heavily diverted for irrigation and do not normally reach the main channel.

== History ==
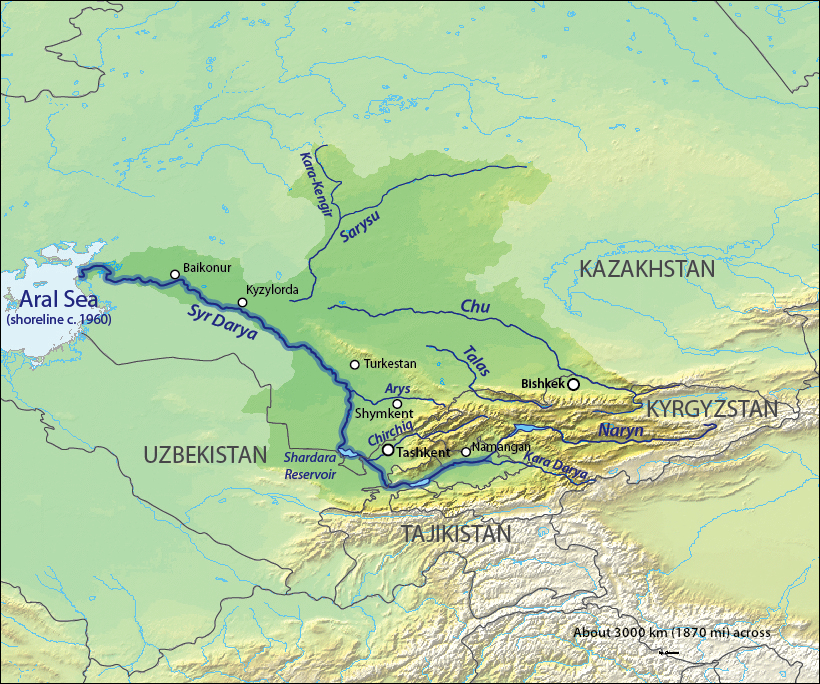
Chu River in the Syr Darya basin

The area of this river was originally home to the Iranian Sughds who spoke Soghdian, an Eastern Iranian language.

During the Middle Ages, the area was strategically important. It was the setting of Suyab, the capital of the Western Turkic Khaganate and Balasagun, the capital of the Qara Khitai (Western Liao dynasty).

The Chu River posed a risk of flooding for settlements located in the Chu Valley. In the winter of 1878, an ice gorge formed on the Chu River upstream from Tokmok, the administrative centre of Semirechye Province. This was followed by severe flooding that damaged the town and the province's capital was moved to Pishpek (Bishkek).

== Dams ==
The river flow is regulated by the dam at Orto-Tokoy Reservoir in Kyrgyzstan built in 1957 and the dam at Tasotkel Reservoir in Kazakhstan built in 1974.

== Ecology and environment ==
=== Environmental monitoring ===
The Kyrgyz State Agency for Hydrometeorology and the Kazakhstan Hydrometeorological Service (Kazhydromet) operate a number of water quality monitoring stations on the Chu River and its tributaries.

=== Water quality ===
According to the Kyrgyz State Agency for Hydrometeorology, in 2004–08 the water pollution index of the Chu River in the Chu Valley ranged from 0.25 to 0.7 units, which is interpreted as Class II ("Clean water"). The only exception was a monitoring point downstream of Vasilyevka village where the water pollution index ranged from 0.4 to 1.2 units and water quality was assessed as Class II(Clean)/Class III ("Moderately polluted").

According to the Kazakhstan Hydrometeorological Service (Kazhydromet), the water pollution index of the Shu (Chu) River in the Jambyl Region of Kazakhstan amounted to 2.01 (Class III, "Moderately polluted") in 2008, and 1.83 (Class III, "Moderately polluted") in 2009. Such water quality parameters as biochemical oxygen demand, nitrites, copper, and phenols exceeded the maximum allowable concentrations.

== Major tributaries ==
In Kyrgyzstan, 4892 rivers and canals flow into Chu River. The main tributaries are, from source to mouth:

- Kochkor (left)
- Joon Aryk (right)
- Chong-Kemin (right)
- Kichi-Kemin (right)
- Kara-Konguz (right)
- Shamshy (left)
- Ysyk-Ata (left)
- Alamüdün (left)
- Ala-Archa (left)
- Jylamysh (left)
- Kakpatas (right)
- Ak-Suu (left)
- Kuragaty (left)

== Gallery ==
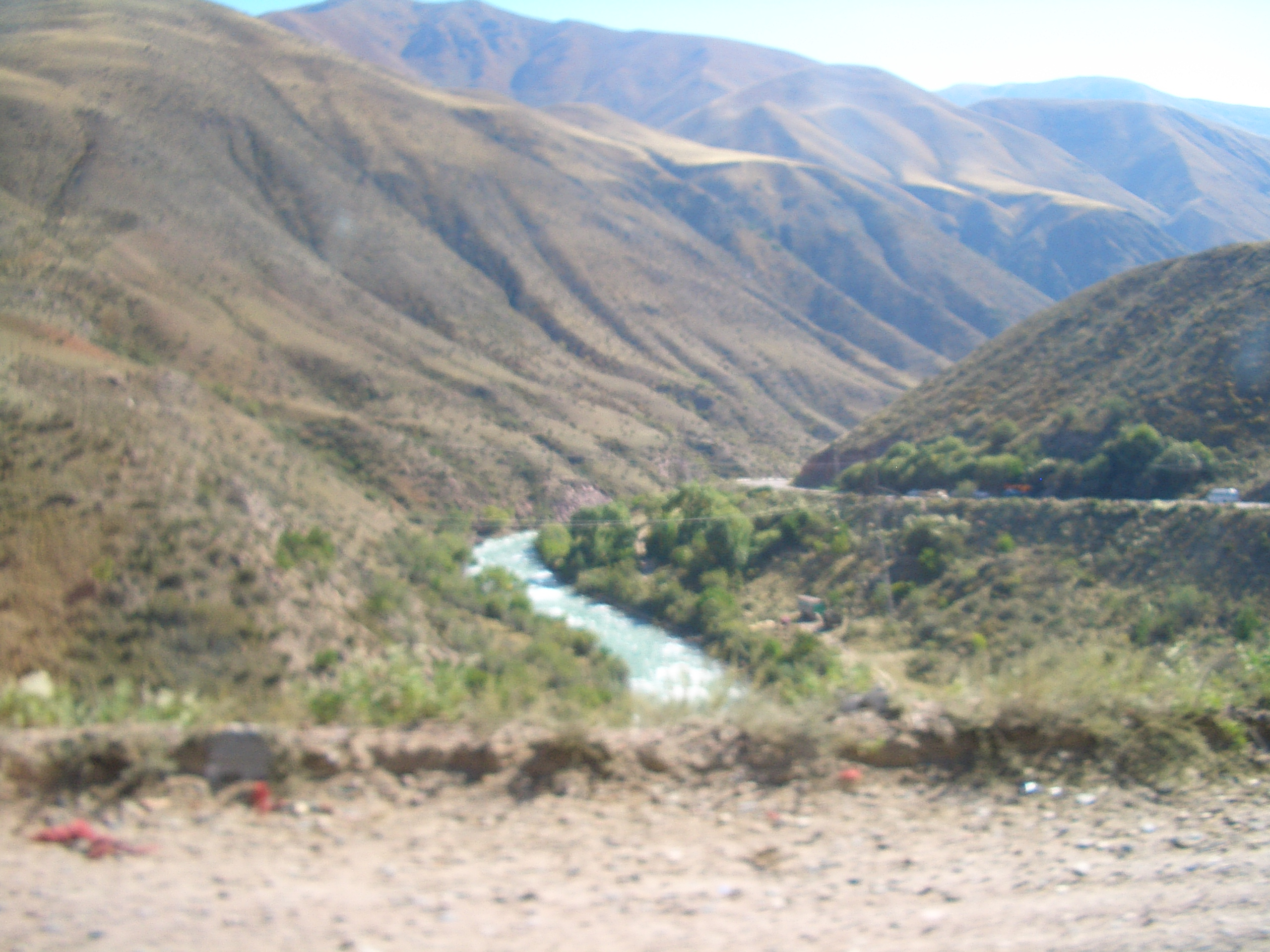
In the Boom Gorge

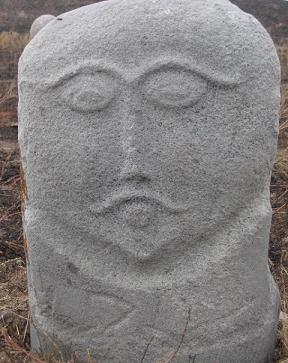
A medieval balbal near Burana Tower in the Chüy Valley

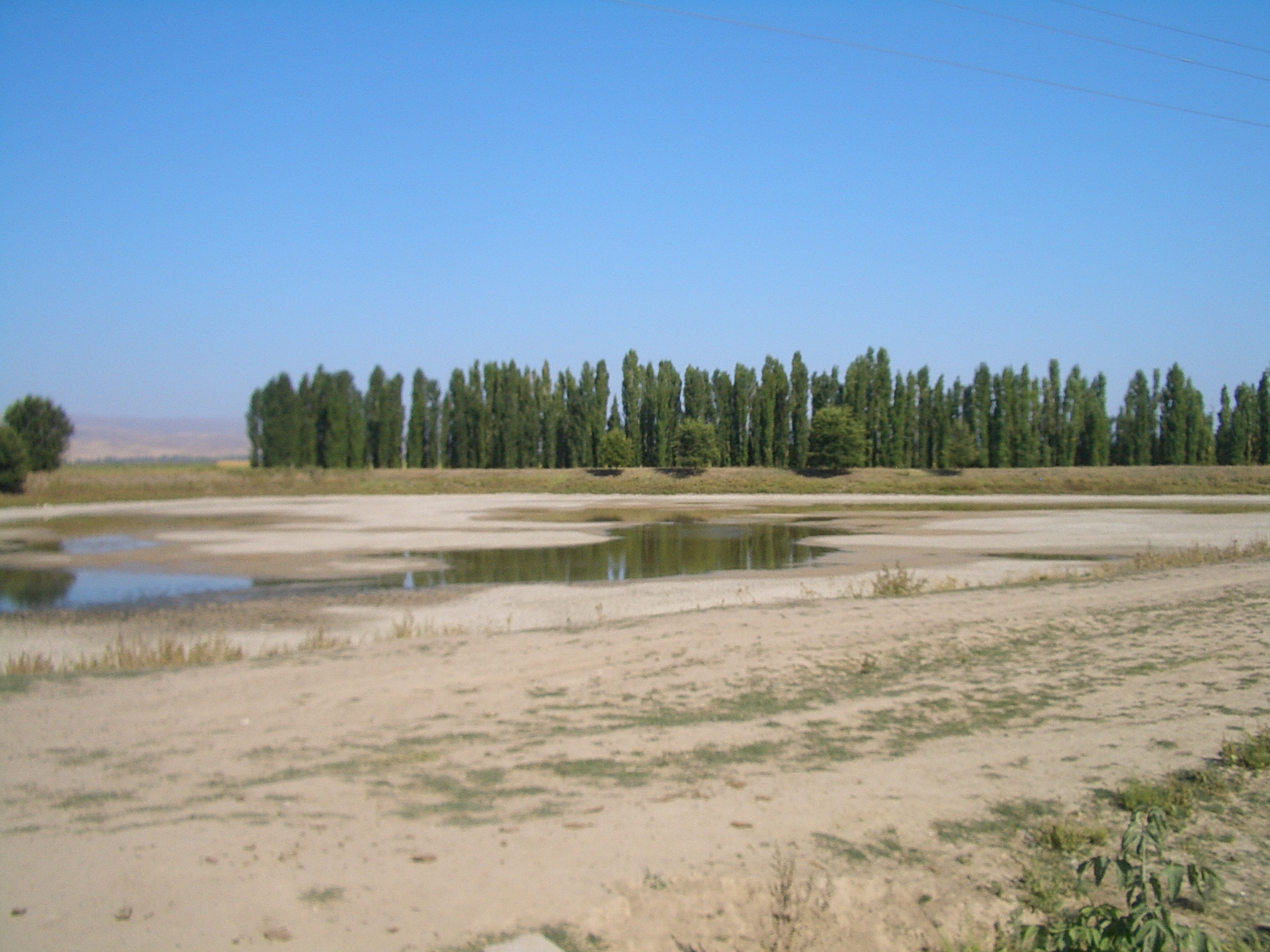
In the Chüy Valley near Milyanfan

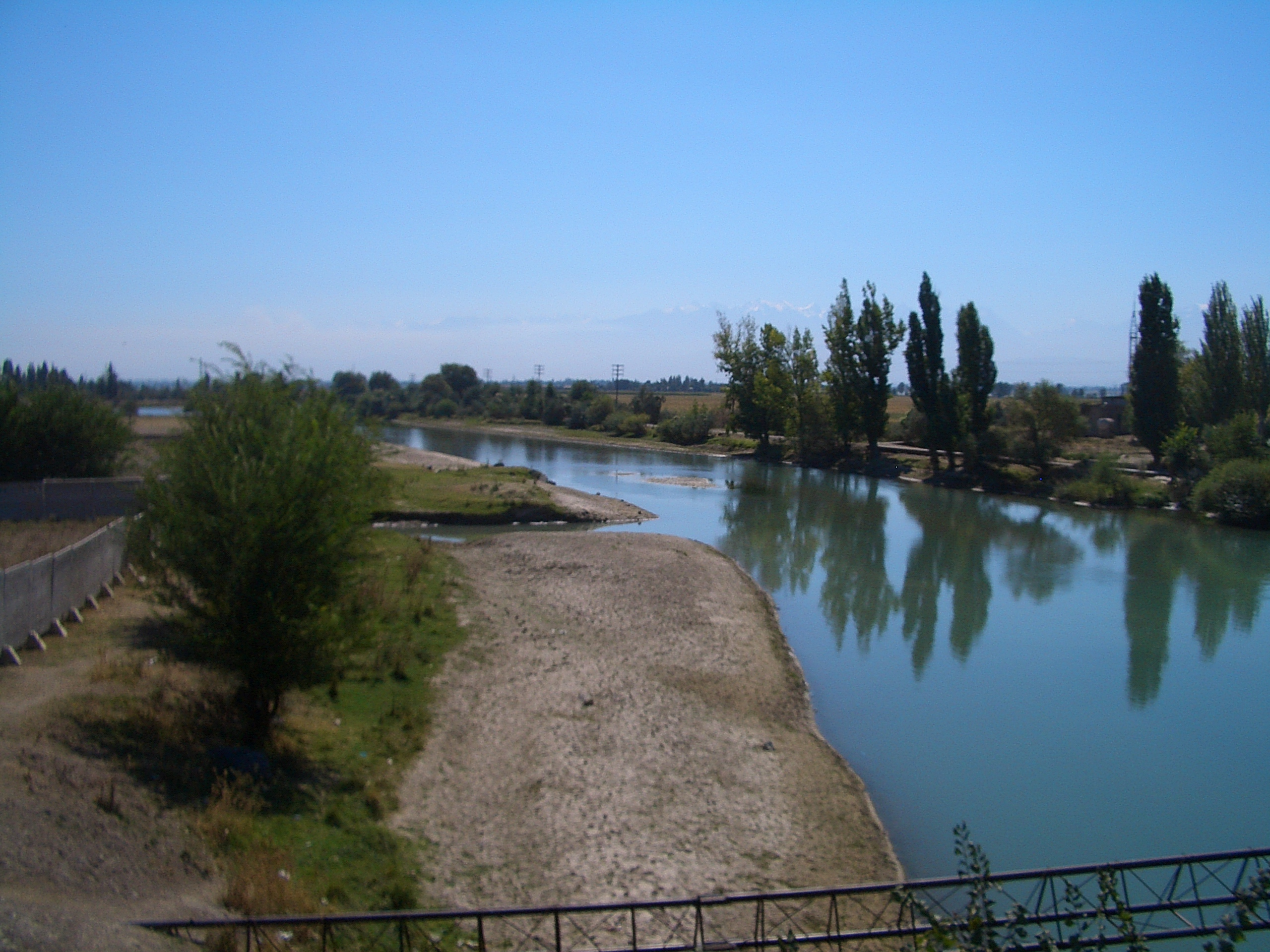
Near Korday border crossing

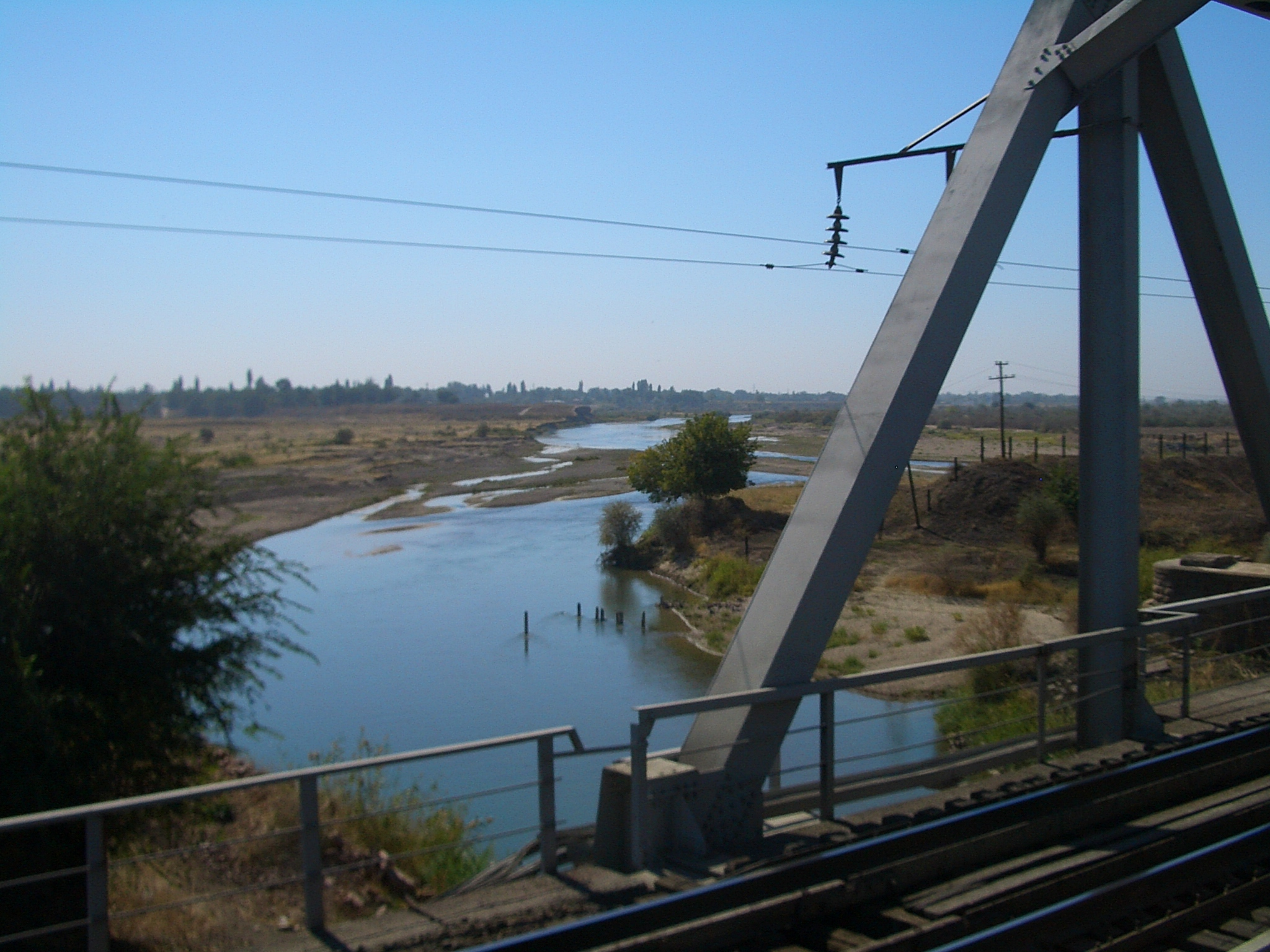
Near Shu, Kazakhstan

== See also ==
- Chu-Ili Range
