= Kayyngdy =

City in Chüy Region, Kyrgyzstan

Kaiyngdy Кайыңды (Kyrgyz)
- City
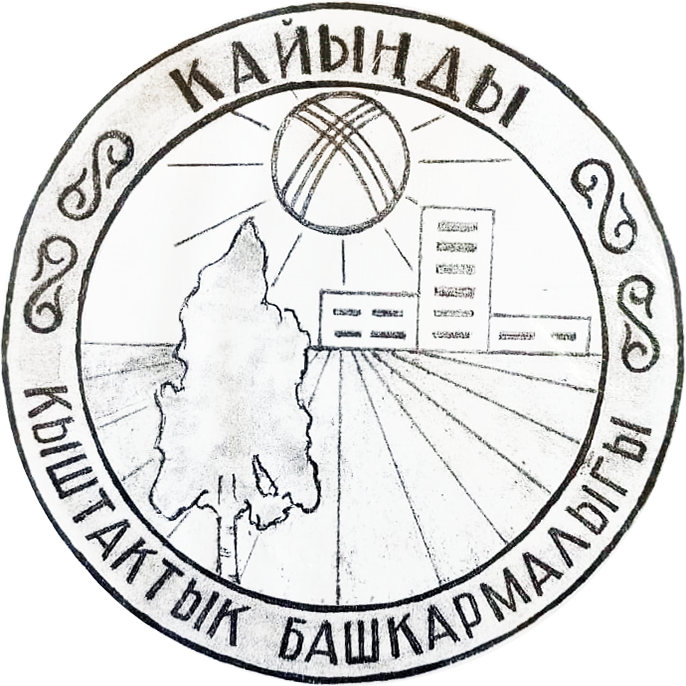
- Flag Coat of arms

- Location in Kyrgyzstan
- Coordinates: 42°49′48″N 73°40′48″E
- Country: Kyrgyzstan
- Region: Chüy
- District: Panfilov
- Founded: 1917

Government
  - Mayor: Rysbek Sheyshenov

Area
  - Total: 10.63 km^{2} (4.10 sq mi)
- Elevation: 860 m (2,820 ft)

Population (2021)
  - Total: 9,561
  - Density: 899.4/km^{2} (2,330/sq mi)
- Time zone: UTC+6
- Area code: +996 3137
- Website: kainda.gov.kg

Kaiyngdy (Kyrgyz: Кайыңды [qʰɑjɯŋtɯ́]), also known as Kainda (Russian: Каинда), is a city in the Chüy Region of northern Kyrgyzstan and the administrative centre of Panfilov District. It was granted city status in 2012. Its population was 9,561 in 2021.

== Etymology ==
According to local tradition recorded by the city administration, Kaiyngdy takes its name from the Chong Kaiyngdy River and gorge, whose names are associated with a birch forest that formerly grew in the area.

== Geography ==
Kaiyngdy is situated in the Chüy Valley, on the Chong Kaiyngdy River, at an elevation of 860 metres above sea level, 88 kilometres west of Bishkek. The Chaldybar–Bishkek–Balykchy railway passes through the city.

== History ==
Kaiyngdy was founded as a village in 1917. It became an urban-type settlement in September 1934.

During World War II, in 1942, the Tank Training Centre of the Polish Anders' Army was based in Kaiyngdy.

Until 1977, Kaiyngdy belonged to Kalinin District. Following the establishment of Panfilov District, it became the district's administrative centre. It was granted city status in 2012.

== Economy ==
Kaiyngdy developed as an industrial settlement. A sugar factory was commissioned in April 1963, followed by a meat-processing plant in December 1965. A brick factory was built in 1973, and woodworking and reinforced-concrete plants followed in 1976.

The Kaindy-Kant sugar factory, founded in 1963, processes sugar beet grown in the Chüy and Talas regions.

== Population ==
Historical population
Year	Pop.	±% p.a.
1970	7,914	—
1979	10,644	+3.35%
1989	11,716	+0.96%
1999	9,085	−2.51%
2009	7,526	−1.86%
2021	9,561	+2.01%
Resident population. Sources:
