= Chüy Valley =

Valley in Kyrgyzstan and Kazakhstan

Coordinates: 42.8333°N 75.2833°E

- Kyrgyz: Чүй өрөөнү Kazakh: Шу аңғары Russian: Чуйская долина
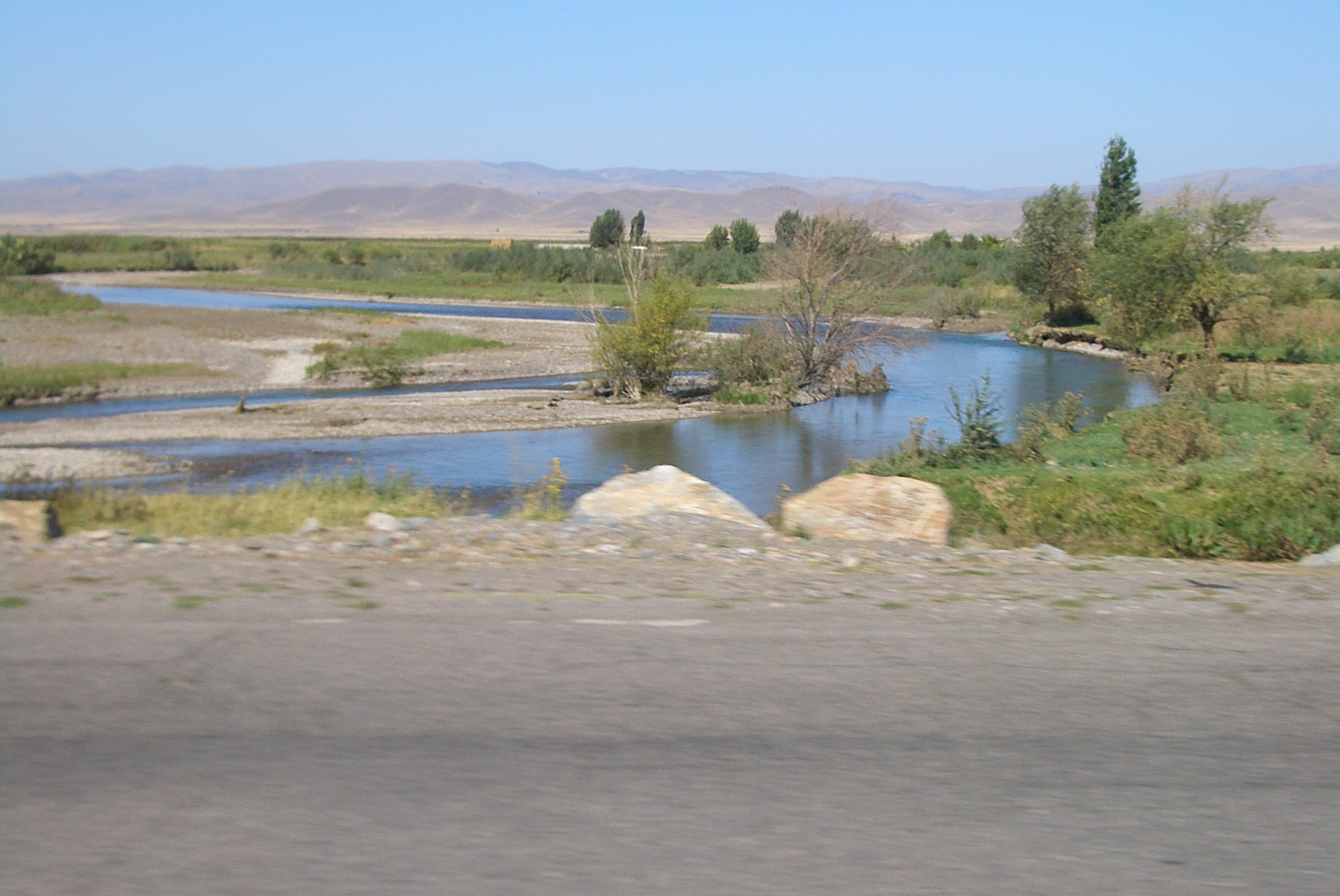
- The Chu River between Milyanfan and Tokmok
- Length: 250 km (160 mi)
- Area: 32,000 km^{2} (12,000 mi^{2})

Geography
- Countries: Kyrgyzstan; Kazakhstan
- State/Province: Chüy Region
- River: Chu
- Interactive map of Chüy Valley

The Chüy Valley (Kyrgyz: Чүй өрөөнү, romanized: Chüy Öröönü; Kazakh: Шу аңғары, romanized: Şu añğary; Russian: Чуйская долина) is a large valley in northern Kyrgyzstan and southern Kazakhstan, in the northern part of the Tian Shan. It extends for approximately 250 km (160 mi) from Boom Gorge in the east to the Muyunkum Desert in the west and is traversed by the Chu River. Its warm summers and water resources make it one of Kyrgyzstan's most fertile and densely populated regions.

== Geography ==
The valley covers approximately 32,000 km^{2} (12,000 sq mi). It is bounded by the Kyrgyz Ala-Too to the south and the Chu-Ili Range to the north. Its narrow eastern end connects with the Issyk-Kul Valley through Boom Gorge.

== Climate ==
The climate is sharply continental, with long, hot summers and relatively short, cold winters. The average temperature in July, the hottest month, is 24.4 °C (76 °F), with a maximum of 43 °C (109 °F). In January, the coldest month, the average is −5.0 °C (23.0 °F), with a minimum of −38 °C (−36 °F).

Annual precipitation ranges from 300 to 500 millimetres (12 to 20 in) across the valley's climatic zones and increases with altitude towards the Kyrgyz Ala-Too. Spring and autumn are the rainiest seasons.

== Hydrology ==
The Chu River is the valley's main watercourse. Its major tributaries within the valley include the Chong-Kemin, Ysyk-Ata, Alamüdün, Ala-Archa, Jylamysh, Ak-Suu and Kara-Balta. The valley also has abundant groundwater, which feeds numerous springs, wetlands and small lakes and is widely used for irrigation. An extensive irrigation network distributes water across the valley.

== Natural vegetation ==
The valley's natural landscapes have been extensively modified by agriculture and other economic activities. Semi-desert vegetation on grey soils is characteristic of the lower valley, up to approximately 900–950 m (2,950–3,120 ft), with wormwood and spring-flowering ephemeral plants. Dry steppe vegetation occurs in the foothills and upper valley, where grasses and wormwood predominate. Shrubs grow on stony ground and in ravines, while reed wetlands occur along spring-fed streams and the Chu River floodplain.

== Land use and natural resources ==
The availability of water for irrigation, together with warm summers, supports agriculture in the valley. Mineral resources include deposits of zinc, lead and gold, as well as construction materials.

The United Nations Office on Drugs and Crime's 2006 World Drug Report estimated that wild cannabis covered 400,000 hectares in the Chüy Valley.

== Settlements ==
Settlements in the Chüy Valley include:

- Bishkek
- Kara-Balta
- Kant
- Kemin
- Shopokov
- Tokmok
- Ivanovka

== Gallery ==
Irrigated fields south of Milyanfan

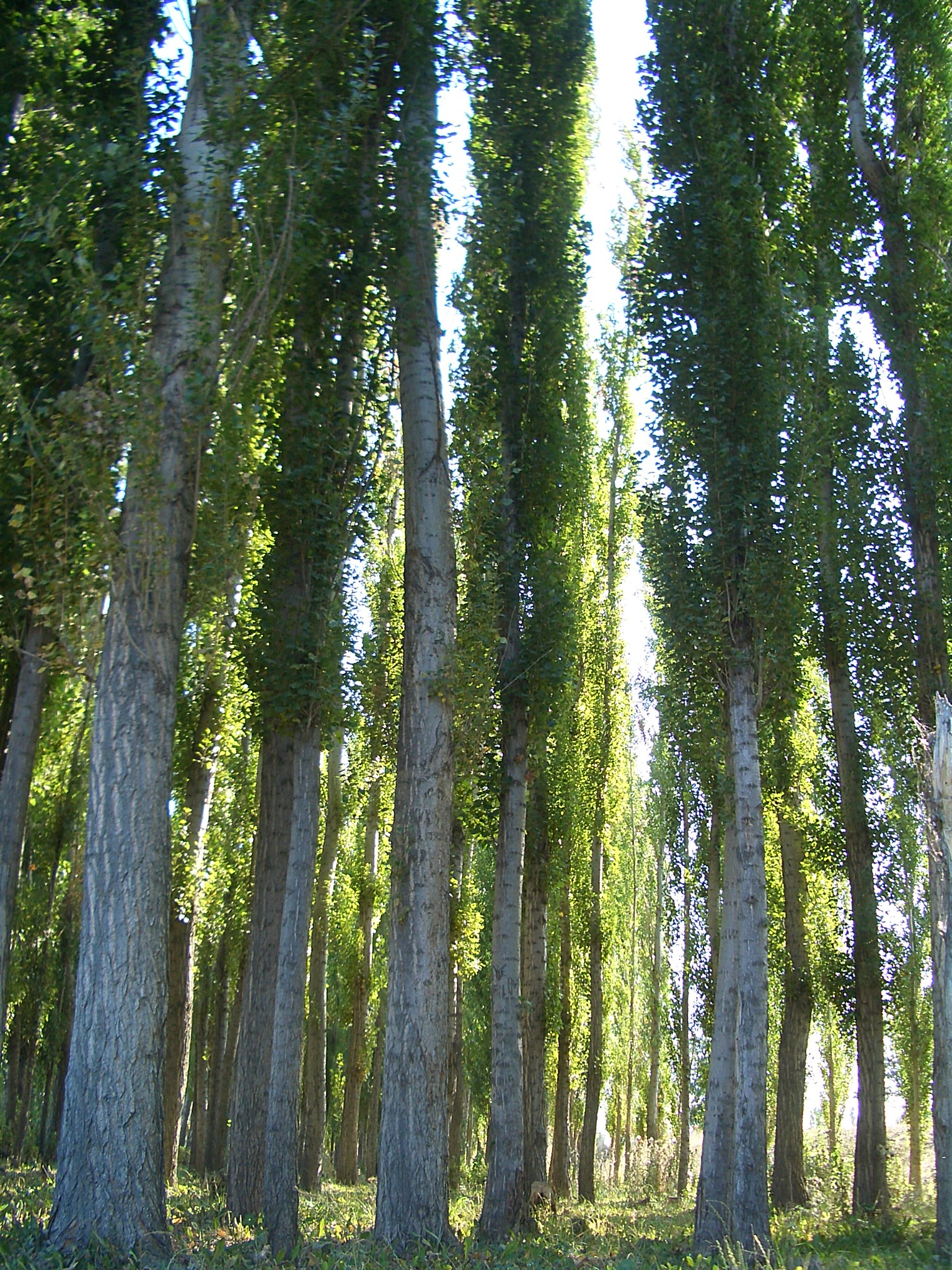
Poplars along an irrigation canal east of Milyanfan

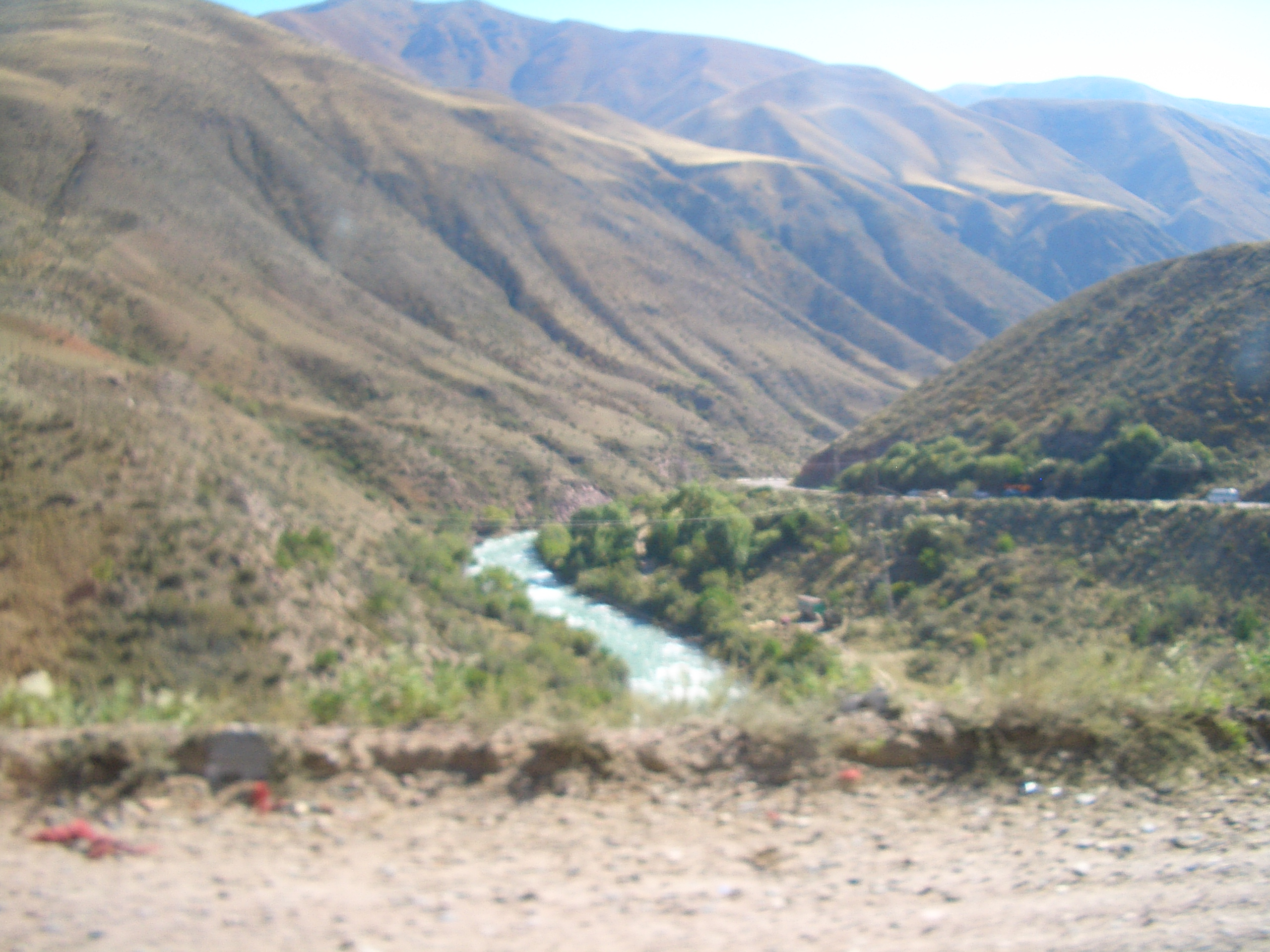
The Chu River near the entrance to the Chüy Valley from Boom Gorge
