= Chapayev (disambiguation) =

Chapayev, Chapaev, Chapayevo, Chapayevsk or Chapayevka may refer to:

- Vasily Chapayev, a Russian soldier and Red Army commander.

== Places ==
Places named after Vasily Chapayev:

- in Russia:
  - Chapayevsk, a city in Samara Oblast
  - Chapayevka (river) in Samara Oblast
  - Chapayevo, Republic of Dagestan, a village in Republic of Dagestan
  - Chapayevo, Olyokminsky District, Sakha Republic, a village in Sakha Republic
- Chapaev, Kazakhstan, a town in Akzhaik District, West Kazakhstan Region, Kazakhstan
- in Kyrgyzstan:
  - Chapaev, Osh, a village in Nookat District, Osh Region
  - Chapaev, Chüy, a village in Chüy District, Chüy Region
  - Chapaev, Batken, a village in Leylek District, Batken Region

== Other ==
- Chapayev (game), a board game
- Chapaev (film), a 1934 film
- Chapayev-class cruiser, a class of Soviet light cruisers
