= Karagul, Chüy =

Karagul Карагул
- Location within Kyrgyzstan
- Coordinates: 42°38′11″N 75°24′06″E
- Country: Kyrgyzstan
- Region: Chüy Region
- District: Chüy District

Population (2021)
  - Total: 76

Karagul (Kyrgyz: Карагул) is a village in the Chüy District of Chüy Region in Kyrgyzstan. The population of the village was 76 in 2021. It is located along the road of national significance М-034 (as per the national road classification) connecting Tokmok, Shamshy and Tuyuk. Karagul is in approximately 24km SSE from Tokmok.
