= Kegeti (river) =

Coordinates: 42°51′N 75°08′E

- Native name: Кегети (Kyrgyz)

Location
- Country: Kyrgyzstan
- Region: Chüy Region
- District: Chüy District

Physical characteristics
- Mouth: Chu
- Length: 55 km (34 mi)
- Basin size: 290 km^{2} (110 sq mi)
- Discharge
  - location: mouth
  - average: 2.34 m^{3}/s (83 cu ft/s)

Basin features
- Progression: Chu→ Betpak-Dala desert
- Tributaries
  - right: Költör

The Kegeti (Kyrgyz: Кегети) is a river in Chüy District of Chüy Region of Kyrgyzstan. It is a left tributary of the Chu. The river is 55 km (34 mi) long, and has a watershed area of 290 km^{2} (110 sq mi). The annual average flow rate is 2.34 m^{3}/s (83 cu ft/s), maximum and minimum flows are in July and in February respectively. The largest tributary of Kegeti is Költör (17 km (11 mi)). The river rises from the northern slopes of Kyrgyz Ala-Too, flows in upstream through a narrow stony gorge northward, and enters Chüy Valley where it branches off. The river is used for irrigation. Villages Kegeti and Ak-Beshim are located at the river.
