= Chong-Jar, Chüy =

Chong-Jar Чоң-Жар
- Location within Kyrgyzstan
- Coordinates: 42°39′47″N 75°23′20″E
- Country: Kyrgyzstan
- Region: Chüy Region
- District: Chüy District

Population (2021)
  - Total: 513

Chong-Jar (Kyrgyz: Чоң-Жар) is a village in the Chüy District of Chüy Region in Kyrgyzstan. The population of the village was 513 in 2021. It is located along the highway of national significance М-034 (as per the national road classification) connecting Tokmok, Shamshy and Tuyuk.
