= Koshoy =

Koshoy Кошой
- Location within Kyrgyzstan
- Coordinates: 42°41′18″N 75°21′13″E
- Country: Kyrgyzstan
- Region: Chüy Region
- District: Chüy District
- Established: 1927

Area
  - Total: 2 km^{2} (0.77 sq mi)

Population (2021)
  - Total: 2,005

Koshoy (Kyrgyz: Кошой, before 2002: Калиновка Kalinovka) is a village in the Chüy District, Chüy Region, Kyrgyzstan. Its population was 2,005 in 2021. It is the center of Ibraimov rural community (ayyl aymagy) that also include villages Kara-Oy, Kyzyl-Asker, Lenin, Lenin-Jol, Taldy-Bulak.
