= Kara-Döbö =

Kara-Döbö may refer to the following places in Kyrgyzstan:

- Kara-Döbö, Batken, a village in Kadamjay District, Batken Region
- Kara-Döbö, Chüy, a village in Chüy District, Chüy Region
- Kara-Döbö, Jayyl, a village in Jayyl District, Chüy Region
- Kara-Döbö, Jalal-Abad, a village in Aksy District, Jalal-Abad Region
- Kara-Döbö, Osh, a village in Kara-Suu District, Osh Region
