= Burana =

Burana may refer to:

- Burana, Kyrgyzstan, a village in Kyrgyzstan
  - Burana Tower, a tower near the village in Kyrgyzstan
- Burana (drug), a nonsteroidal anti-inflammatory drug (NSAID) by Orion Corporation

== See also ==
- Burana Codex, Carmina Burana
