= Sagynbek Ishenov =

Kyrgyz animator

- Born: April 5, 1933
- Died: June 27, 2024 (aged 91)
- Occupations: Filmmaker, Animator, Production Designer

Sagynbek Ishenov (Kyrgyz: Ише́нов Сагынбе́к; 5 April 1934 – 27 June 2024) is a Kyrgyz artist, filmmaker and animator, often known as the father of Kyrgyz animation for his work in the 70s and 80s.

He graduated from the Gerasimov Institute of Cinematography in 1961 after which he participated in many Soviet and international art exhibitions. He was also a member of the USSR Union of Cinematographers (1966) and the USSR Union of Artists (1967). He worked in feature films like Bakaj's Meadow (1966), Urkuya (1971), Phantoms Trapped In Stone (1974), Spy Story (1976), shot by the Kyrgyzfilm film studio. During this time he received accolades such as the first prize at the review of films of the Central Asian republics and Kazakhstan in 1968, an Honorary Diploma at the International Festival in Frankfurt am Main, and the Golden Alpine Branch in Trieste, Italy (1969).

Since 1970, a group of artists led by Ishenov at the Kyrgyzfilm film studio produced the first Kyrgyz animated film Numbers Quarrel. Ishenov's works in painting, which sharply depict revolutionary and civic themes, include: After the Great Battle (1968), Free Mountain (1969), A Lamp For A Distant Village (1971), A Long Way (1975), For A New Life (1977) and others. His painting Red Oxen, Blue Plow is considered one of his best paintings (Tretyakov Gallery, 1969). His paintings are kept in the Kyrgyz National Museum of Fine Arts named after G. Aitiev, the Tretyakov Gallery, and other museums in the CIS countries.

== Biography ==
Sagynbek Ishenov was born on April 5, 1934, in the village of Don-Aryk, CHuy district, near the Burana village, where the ancient city of Balasagyn was located. When he was young, he drew a picture of the Burana city hall and went to the Kyrgyz painter, Gapar Aitiev, who gave him a referral to the art school and immediately offered to enroll in the second year. Before the collapse of the Soviet Union, when he visited Tashkent in 1989, he had the opportunity to make a portrait of Yusuf Balasaguni.

In his youth, he greatly admired the poet Alykul Osmonov. He recalls this as follows: "Alykul Osmonov has been close to my world since childhood. That is why I turned to the topic of Alykul. My cartoon Tolubay Synchy, based on his work, in 1982, was awarded a diploma at an international festival in France. When the poet passed away, we were students at school No. 5 in our capital. I remember that they were escorting him from the building of the current Russian Drama Theater. We also participated in it..." He graduated from the S.A. Chuykov Kyrgyz State Art School in 1955. He graduated from the Gerasimov Institute of Cinematography 1961. He was then an artist at the Kyrgyzfilm film studio from 1961 to 1976). In 1977, he organized and led the first animation team in Kyrgyzstan.

Sagyn Ishenov thinks that "the first thing I want to see is the ordinary people of the village." Despite the famous paintings he has made and the recognition he has as a great artist, he is proud that the people in his village have known him only as an artist for the magazine Chalkan. He also a workshop at the Don-Aryk secondary school near his hometown.

== Personal life ==
He was married to a craftswoman, Asiya Ishenova on 30th October 1963 in Bishkek. They had 3 sons: Murat, Turat and Rat, along with one daughter, Ainura.

He died on June 27, 2024, at the age of 90.

== Filmography ==
Year	Name	Role	Notes
1963	Cosmonaut Street	Production Designer	
1965	The Most Obedient Girl	Production Designer	
1966	The Sky Of Our CHildhood	Production Designer	
1971	Bow To The Fire	Production Designer	
1972	Swans Fly Here	Production Designer	
1972	Phantoms Trapped In Stone	Production Designer	
1976	Sypaychi	Production Designer	TV Show
1977	Numbers Quarrel	Director	Animated Short Film
1978	Olokon	Director	Animated Short Film
1979	Old Man Meke and The Black Giant	Director	Animated Short Film
1980	Two Little Hares	Director	Animated Short Film
1982	The Portrait	Director	Animated Short Film
1983	Tolubay The Critic	Director	Animated Short Film
1988	Akyn Alykul Osmonov	Director	
1990	Berkutchi	Director	Documentary
1991	The Falconer	Director	Documentary

== Awards and honours ==
- Honored Worker of Arts of the Kyrgyz SSR (1974)
- People's Artist of Kyrgyzstan (1992)
- Laureate of the Alykul Osmonov Prize (1990)
