= Taldy-Bulak, Chüy =

Taldy-Bulak Талды-Булак
- Location within Kyrgyzstan
- Coordinates: 42°42′43″N 75°16′53.7″E
- Country: Kyrgyzstan
- Region: Chüy Region
- District: Chüy District

Population (2021)
  - Total: 758

Taldy-Bulak (Kyrgyz: Талды-Булак) is a village in the Chüy District, Chüy Region, Kyrgyzstan. Its population was 758 in 2021. It is subordinated to Ibraimov rural community (ayyl aymagy) that also include villages Koshoy (center), Kara-Oy, Kyzyl-Asker, Lenin, and Lenin-Jol.
