= Kayyrma =

Kayyrma may refer to the following places in Kyrgyzstan:

- Kayyrma, Alamüdün, a village in Alamüdün District, Chüy Region
- Kayyrma, Chüy, a village in Chüy District, Chüy Region
- Kayyrma, Jayyl, a village in Jayyl District, Chüy Region
- Kayyrma, Jalal-Abad, a village in Bazar-Korgon District, Jalal-Abad Region
