= Kurgan stelae =

Anthropomorphic stone stelae within the perimeter of a tumulus

Kurgan stelae

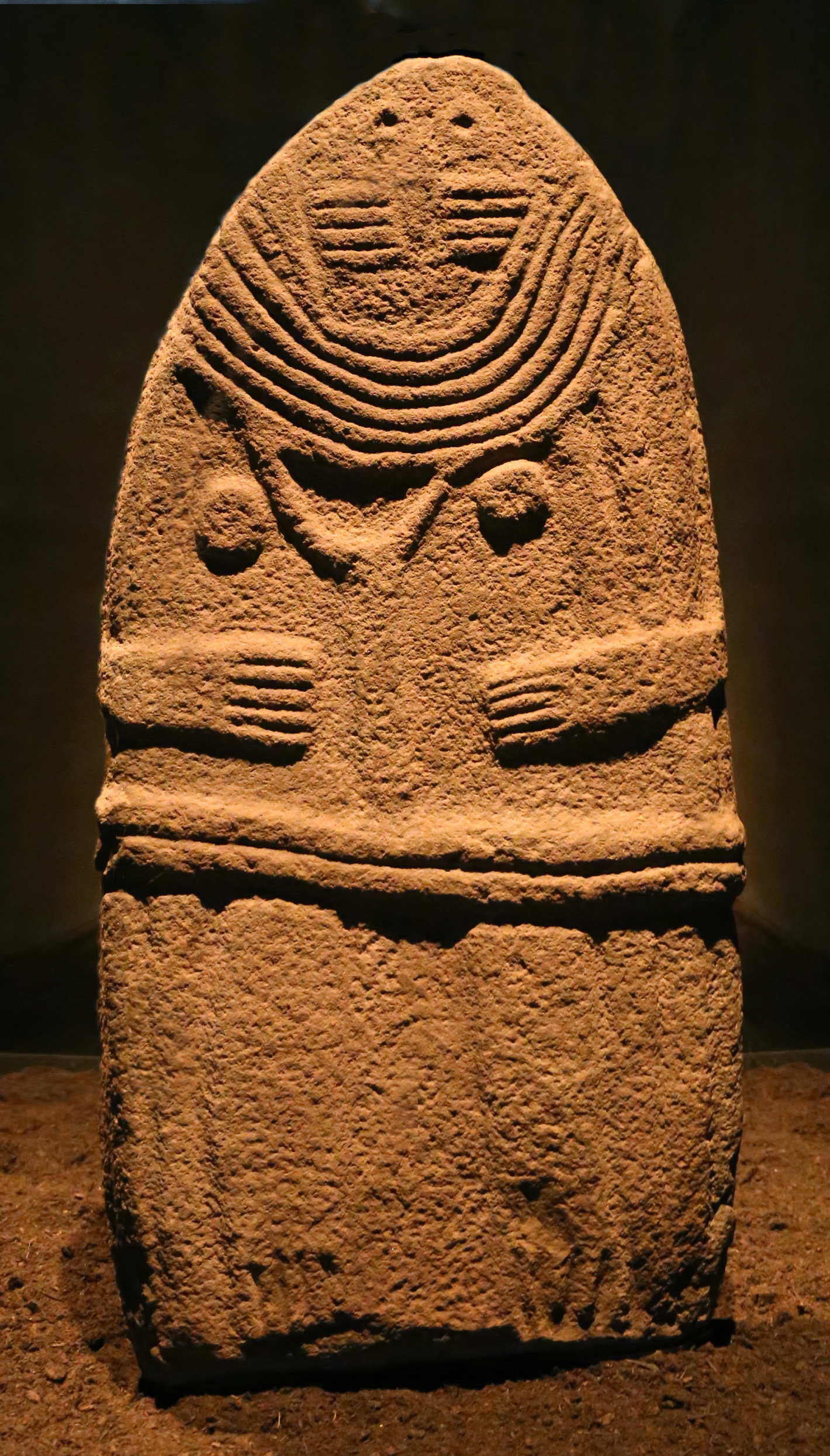
"La Dame de Saint-Sernin", southern France, 3100-2900 BC.

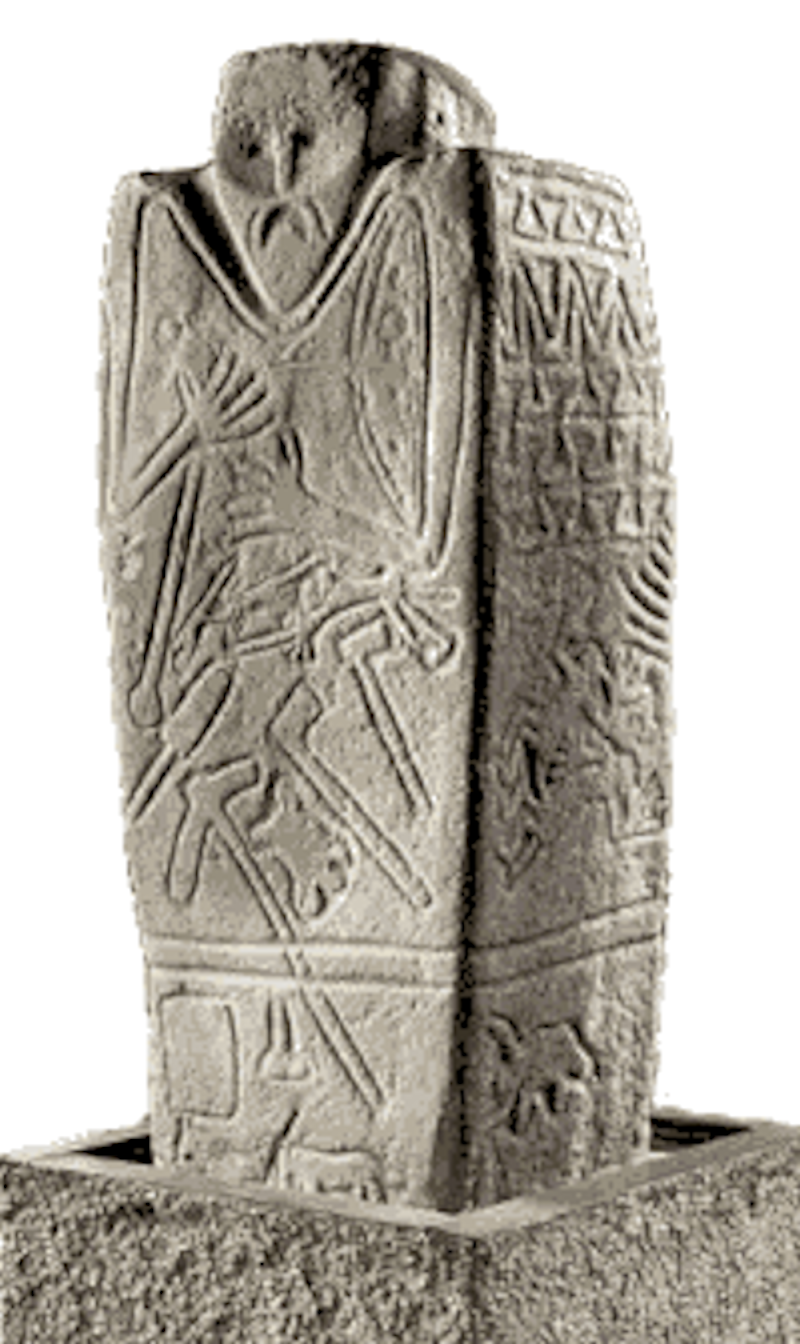
The Kernosivsky idol (Керносівський ідол), dated to the mid 3rd millennium BC and associated with the late Pit Grave (Yamna) culture. (Note: Discovered in 1973 in Kernosovka (Kernosivka), Novomoskovsk Raion, Dnipropetrovsk Oblast, Ukrainian SSR, kept in Yavornytsky Historical Museum, Dnipro.)

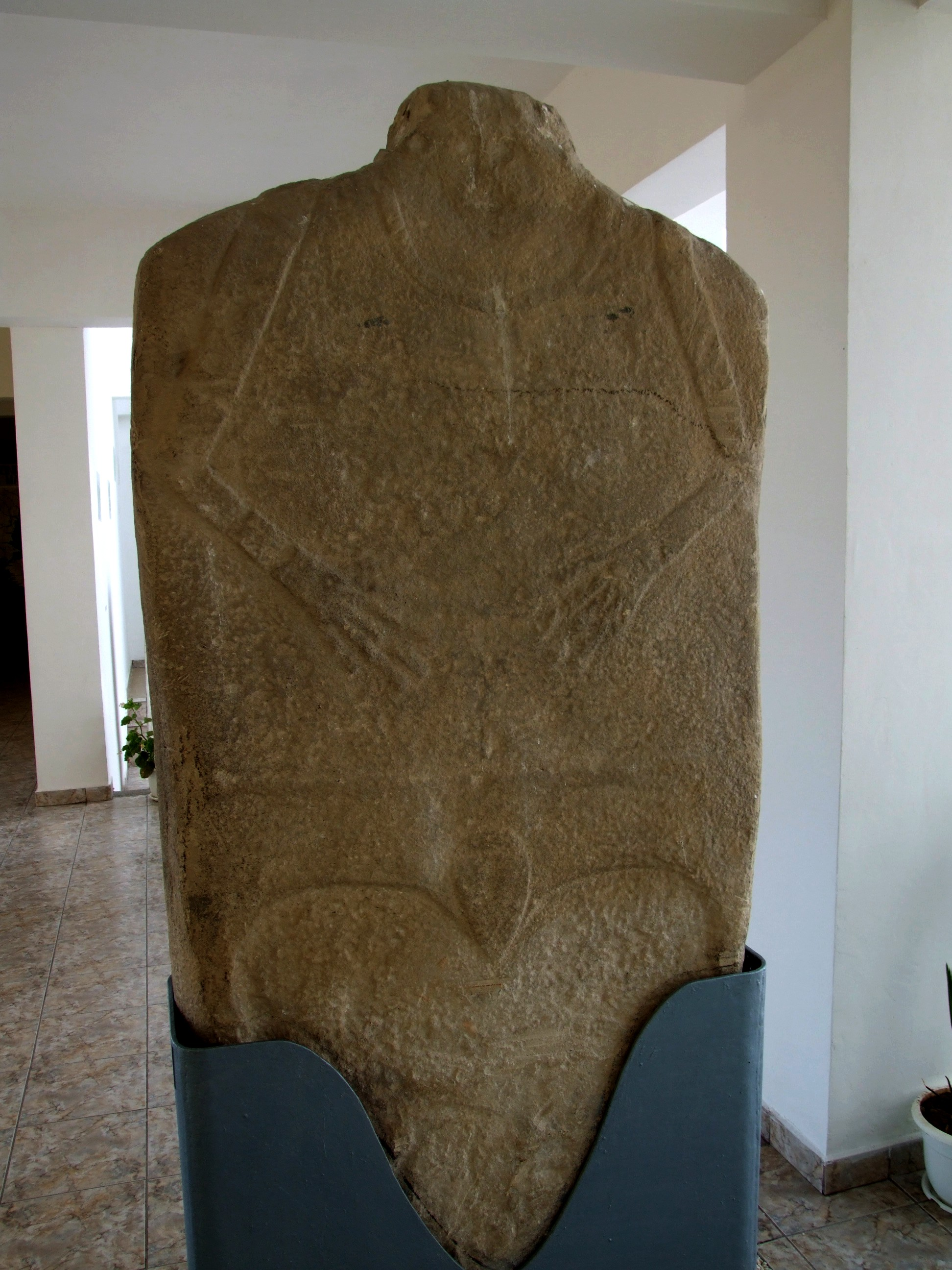
Anthropomorphic stele of the early type (Neolithic period) from Hamangia-Baia, Romania exhibited at Histria Museum

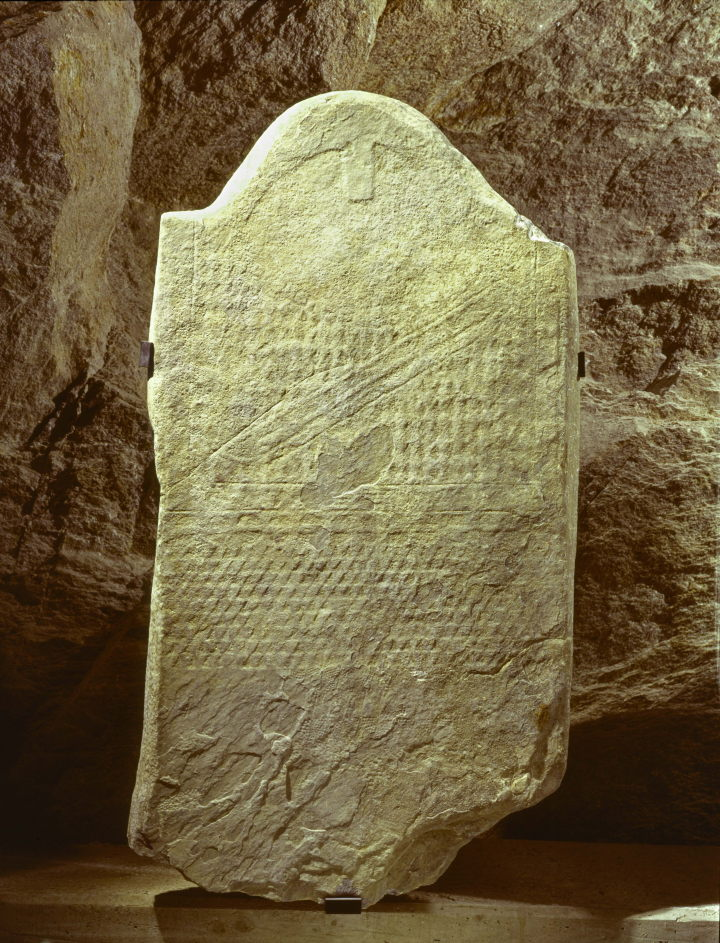
Stele #25 from the Petit Chasseur in Sion, Switzerland, dating from 2700–2150 BC

Kurgan stelae (Note: Mongolian: хүн чулуу, romanized: khün chuluu Russian: каменные бабы, romanized: kamennyye baby Ukrainian: Баби кам'яні, romanized: baby kamiani, lit. 'stone babas' Tuvan: Кижи-көжээ, romanized: kiji köjee) (sing. stele or stela) or balbals (Kyrgyz: балбал [bɑlbɑl]; from Turkic balbal meaning 'ancestor' or 'grandfather') are anthropomorphic stone stelae, images cut from stone, installed atop, within or around kurgans (i.e. tumuli), in kurgan cemeteries, or in a double line extending from a kurgan. The stelae are also described as "obelisks" or "statue menhirs".

Spanning more than three millennia, they are clearly the product of multiple different cultures. The earliest are associated with the Pit Grave culture of the Pontic–Caspian steppe (and therefore with the Proto-Indo-Europeans according to the mainstream Kurgan hypothesis). The Iron Age specimens are identified with the Scythians and medieval examples with Turkic peoples.

Such stelae are found in large numbers in Southern Russia, Ukraine, Prussia, southern Siberia, Central Asia, Turkey, and Mongolia.

== Purpose ==
Anthropomorphic stelae were probably memorials to the honoured dead. (Note: W. Radloff: "stone obelisk in honour of deceased.") (Note: Leonid Kyzlasov: "a vertically anchored stone near a memorial structure, symbolizing a killed enemy" Kyzlasov (1969), pp. 207–208) They are found in the context of burials and funeral sanctuaries from the Eneolithic through to the Middle Ages. Ivanovovsky reported that Tarbagatai Torgouts (Kalmyks) revered kurgan obelisks in their country as images of their ancestors, and that when a bowl was held by the statue, it was to deposit a part of the ashes after the cremation of the deceased, and another part was laid under the base of the statue.

When used architecturally, stelae could act as a system of stone fences, frequently surrounded by a moat, with sacrificial hearths, sometimes tiled on the inside.

== History and distribution ==
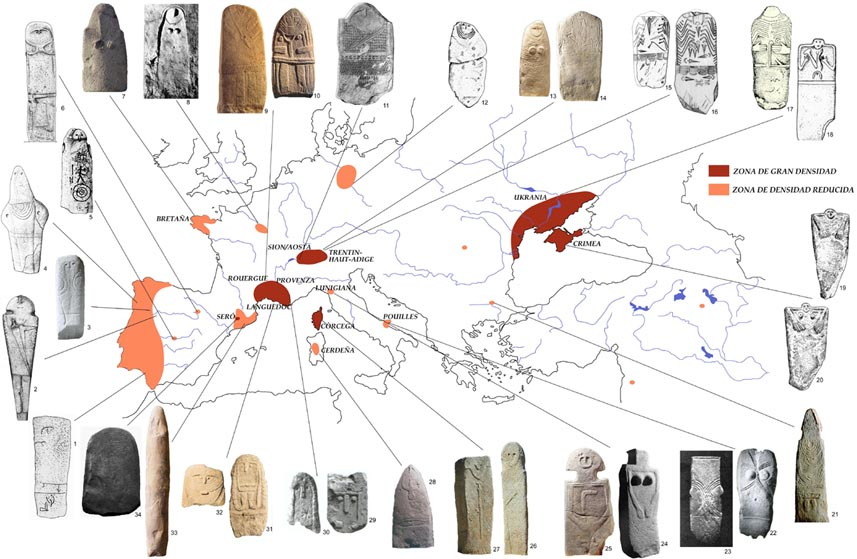
Megalithic stelae in Europe

The earliest anthropomorphic stelae date to the 4th millennium BC, and are associated with the early Bronze Age Yamna Horizon, in particular with the Kemi Oba culture of the Crimea and adjacent steppe region. Those in Ukraine number around three hundred, most of them very crude stone slabs with a simple schematic protruding head and a few features such as eyes or breasts carved into the stone. Some twenty specimens, known as statue menhirs, are more complex, featuring ornaments, weapons, human or animal figures.

The simple, early type of anthropomorphic stelae are also found in the Alpine region of Italy, southern France and Portugal. Examples have also been found in Bulgaria at Plachidol, Ezerovo, and Durankulak and at Hamangia-Baia, Romania.

The distribution of later stelae is limited in the west by the Odesa district, Podolsk province, Galicia, Kalisz province, Prussia; in the south by Kacha River, Crimea; in the south-east by Kuma River in the Stavropol province and Kuban region; in the north by Minsk province and Oboyan district of the Kursk province (in some opinions even the Ryazan province), Ahtyr district in the Kharkiv province, Voronezh province, Balash and Atkar districts in the Saratov province to the banks of Samara River in Buzuluk districts in the Samara province

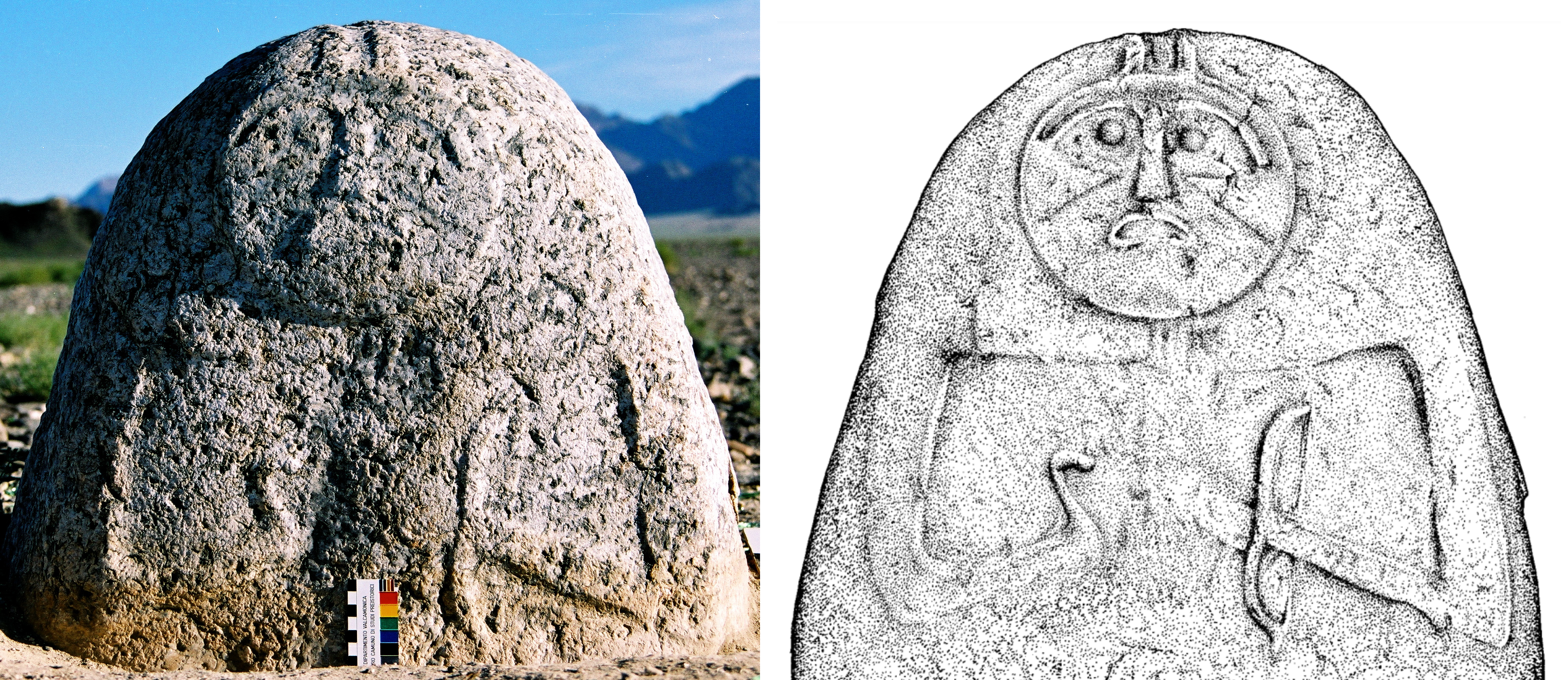
The "Oldest Kurgan stelae in Mongolia", circa 2500-2000 BCE: Chemurchek culture standing stone (Yagshiin khodoo 3). 46.1218°N 91.5718°E

In the east they are spread in the Kyrgyz (Kazakh) steppe to the banks of the Irtysh River and to Turkestan (near Issyk Kul, Tokmak district), then in upper courses of rivers Tom and Yenisei, in Sagai steppe in Mongolia (according to Potanin and Yadrintseva).

The Cimmerians of the early 1st millennium BC left a small number (about ten are known) of distinctive stone stelae. Another four or five "deer stones" dating to the same time are known from the northern Caucasus.

From the 7th century BC, Scythian tribes began to dominate the Pontic steppe. They were in turn displaced by the Sarmatians from the 2nd century BC, except in Crimea, where they persisted for a few centuries longer. These peoples left carefully crafted stone stelae, with all features cut in deep relief.

Early Slavic stelae are again more primitive. There are some thirty sites of the middle Dniestr region where such anthropomorphic figures were found. The most famous of these is the Zbruch Idol (c. 10th century), a post measuring about 3 meters, with four faces under a single pointed hat (cf. Svetovid). Boris Rybakov argued for identification of the faces with the gods Perun, Makosh, Lado and Veles.

== Anthropomorphic stelae of the Near East ==
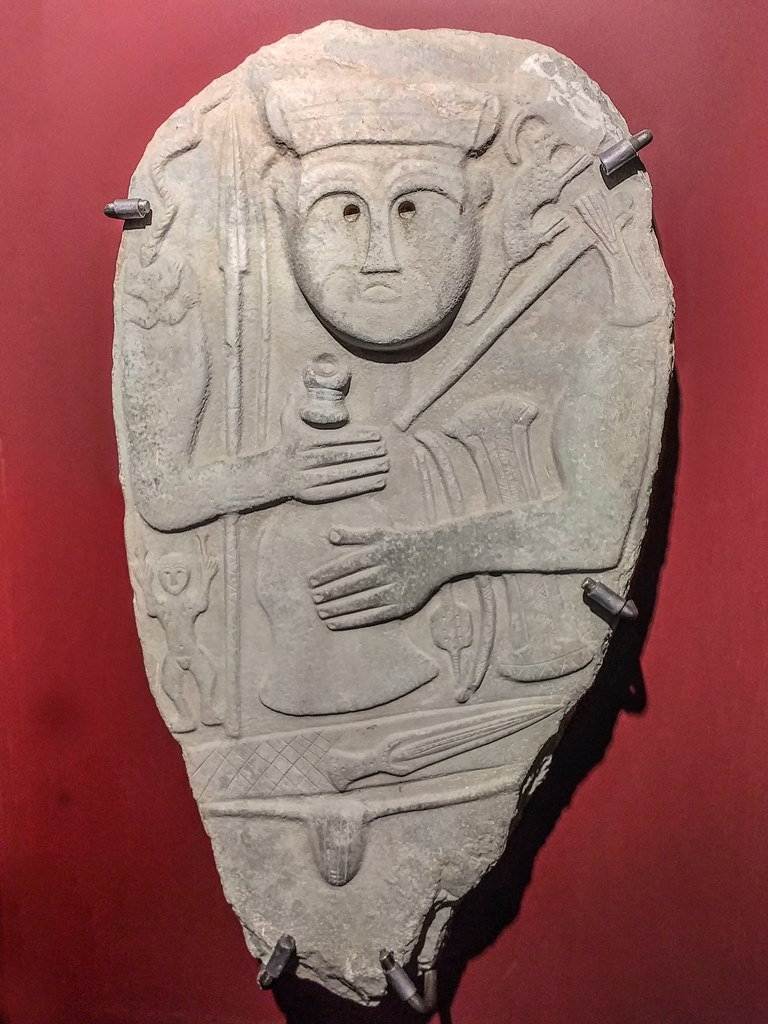
A Hakkari stele: An armed male warrior wearing a cap (1500-1000 BCE)

Bronze Age anthropomorphic funerary stelae have been found in Saudi Arabia. There are similarities to the Kurgan type in the handling of the slab-like body with incised detail, though the treatment of the head is rather more realistic.

The anthropomorphic stelae so far found in Anatolia appear to post-date those of the Kemi Oba culture on the steppe and are presumed to derive from steppe types. A fragment of one was found in the earliest layer of deposition at Troy, known as Troy I.

=== Hakkari Stelae ===
Thirteen stone stelae, of a type similar to those of the Eurasian steppes, were found in 1998 in their original location at the centre of Hakkâri, a city in the south eastern corner of Turkey, and are now on display in the Van Museum. The stelae were carved on upright flagstone-like slabs measuring between 0.7 m to 3.10 m in height. The stones contain only one cut surface, upon which human figures have been chiseled. The theme of each stelae reveals the fore view of an upper human body. Eleven of the stelae depict naked warriors with daggers, spears, and axes-masculine symbols of war. They always hold a drinking vessel made of skin in both hands. Two stelae contain female figures without arms. The earliest of these stelae are in the style of bas relief while the latest ones are in a linear style. They date from the 15th to the 11th century BC and may represent the rulers of the kingdom of Hubushkia, perhaps derived from a Scythian/Saka group that migrated into the region along with other Indo-European people from Eurasian steppe culture at the heydays of Indo-European, Aryan migration event.

== Recording ==
European traveler William of Rubruck mentioned them for the first time in the 13th century, seeing them on kurgans in the Cuman (Kipchak) country, he reported that Cumans installed these statues on tombs of their deceased. These statues are also mentioned in the 17th-century "Large Drawing Book", as markers for borders and roads, or orientation points. In the 18th century information about some kurgan stelae was collected by Pallas, Falk, Guldenshtedt, Zuev, Lepekhin, and in the first half of the 19th century by Klaprot, Duboa-de-Montpere and Spassky (Siberian obelisks). Count Aleksey Uvarov, in the 1869 Works of the 1st Archeological Congress in Moscow (vol. 2), assembled all available at that time data about kurgan obelisks, and illustrated them with drawings of 44 statues.

Later in the 19th century, data about these statues was gathered by A. I. Kelsiev, and in Siberia, Turkestan and Mongolia by Potanin, Pettsold, Poyarkov, Vasily Radlov, Ivanov, Adrianov and Yadrintsev, in Prussia by Lissauer and Gartman.

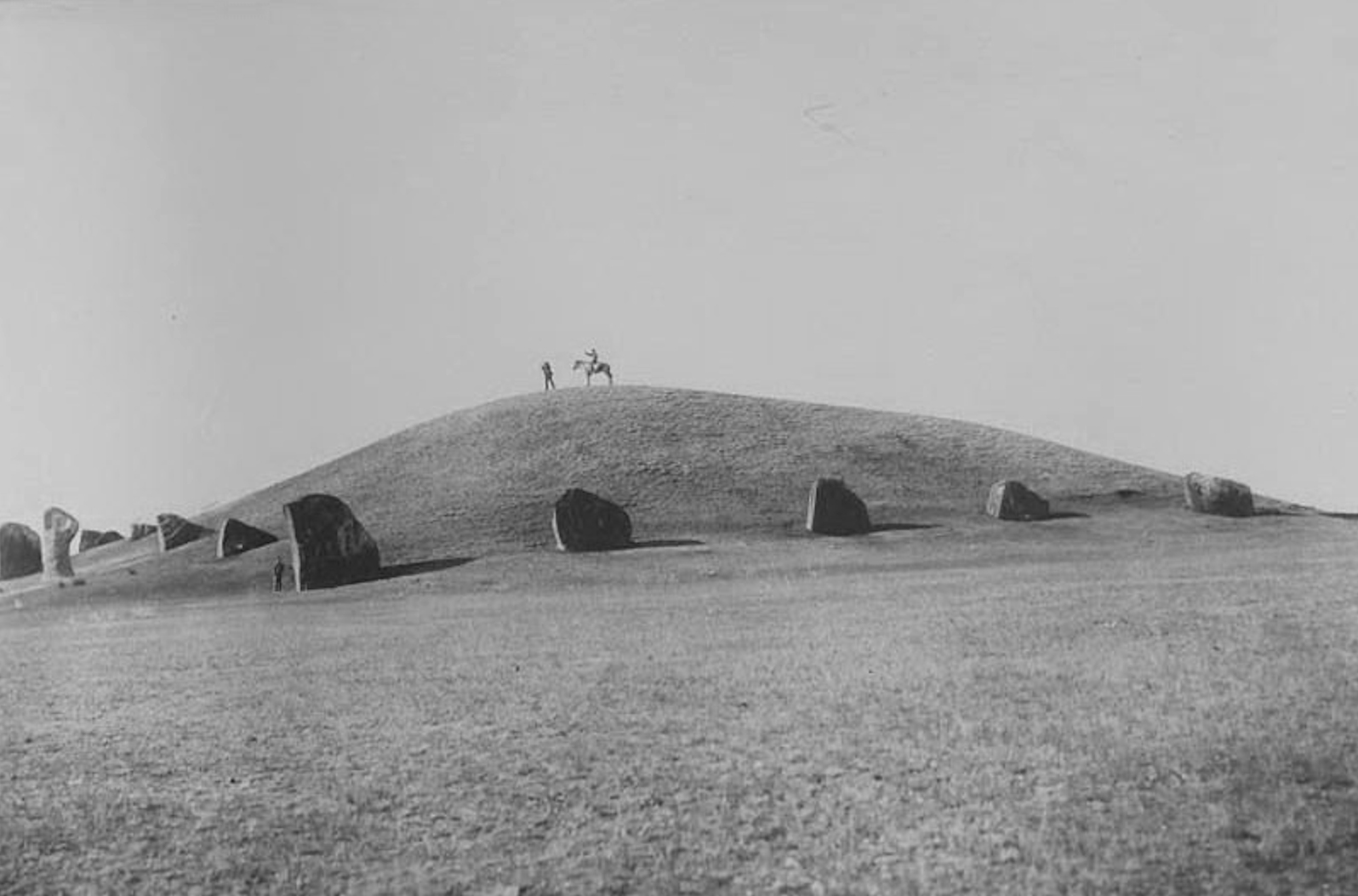
Salbyk kurgan, Tagar culture, 5th to 4th century BC. Photographed before excavation, early 20th-century, Minusinsk territory, Siberia

== Numbers ==
The State Historical Museum in Moscow has 30 specimens (in the halls and in the courtyard); others are in Kharkiv, Odesa, Novocherkassk, etc. These are only a small part of examples dispersed in various regions of Eastern Europe, of which multitudes were already destroyed and used as construction material for buildings, fences, etc.

In the 1850s Piskarev, summing all information about kurgan obelisks available in literature, counted 649 items, mostly in Ekaterinoslav province (428), in Taganrog (54), in Crimea province (44), in Kharkiv (43), in the Don Cossacks land (37), in Yenisei province, Siberia (12), in Poltava (5), in Stavropol (5), etc.; but many statues remained unknown to him.

== Appearance ==
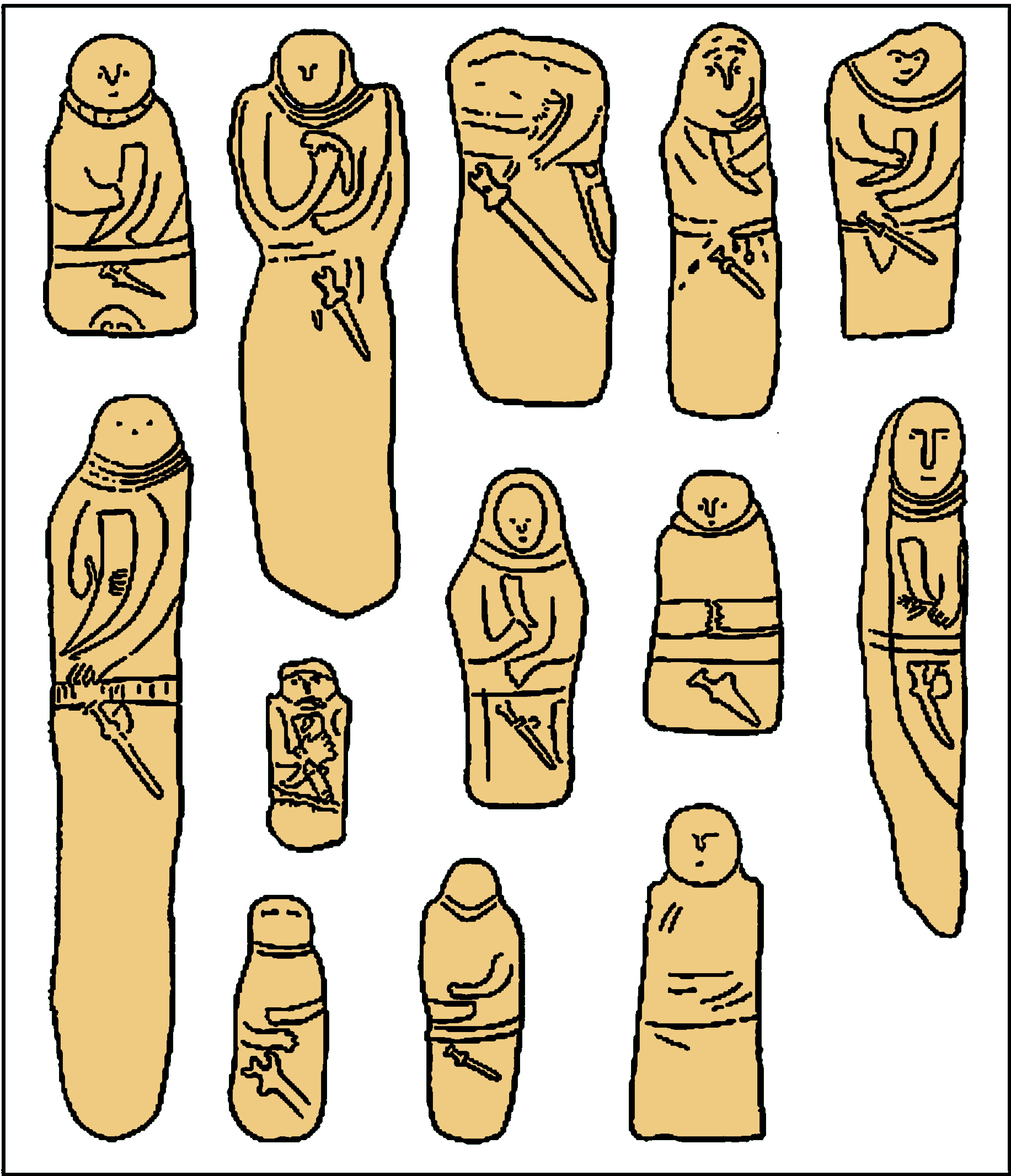
Collection of drawings of Scythian stelae of the 6th to 5th centuries BC.

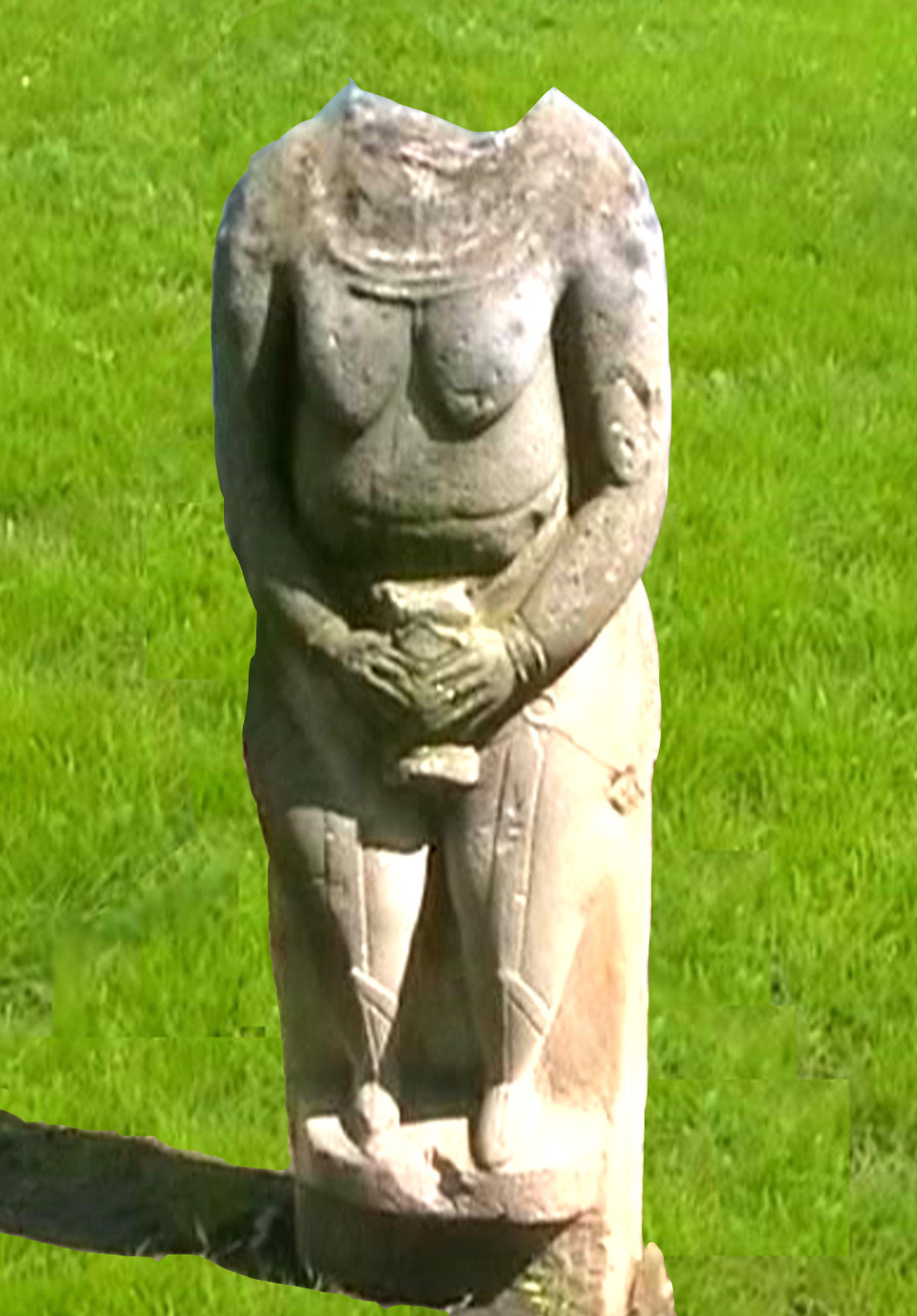
Turkic-style Kipchak balbal, near Luhansk.

Scythian balbals, later Cuman, commonly depict a warrior holding a drinking horn in their upraised right hand. (Note: 40 out of a total of 137 anthropomorphic stelae described by Ol'khovskiy & Evdokimov (1994), 67,69 table 14 include the depiction of a drinking horn.) Many also show a sword or dagger suspended on the warrior's belt.

Writing about Altai kurgans, L.N. Gumilev states: "To the east from the tombs are standing chains of balbals, crudely sculpted stones implanted in the ground. Number of balbals at the tombs I investigated varies from 0 to 51, but most often there are 3–4 balbals per tomb". Similar numbers are also given by Kyzlasov. They are memorials to the feats of the deceased, every balbal represents an enemy killed by him. Many tombs have no balbals. Apparently, there are buried ashes of women and children.

Balbals have two clearly distinct forms: conic and flat, with shaved top. Considering the evidence of Orkhon inscriptions that every balbal represented a certain person, such distinction cannot be by chance. Likely here is marked an important ethnographic attribute, a headdress. The steppe-dwellers up until present wear a conic malahai, and the Altaians wear flat round hats. The same forms of headdresses are recorded for the 8th century. (Note: (Gumilev L.N. Statuettes...)." "We can note that fight against steppe was more successful, as from 486 balbals we investigated, 329 were conical, and 157 flat." "Sudden raids on the steppe pastures were more successfully than endless struggle with moutaineers, who knew each tree in the forest and each rock in the gorges. Maybe this is a reason why the flat-headed balbals, as a rule, are more massive than conical") Another observation of Lev Gumilev: "From the Tsaidam salt lakes to the Kül-tegin monument leads a three-kilometer chain of balbals. To our time survived 169 balbals, apparently there were more. Some balbals are given a crude likeness with men, indicated are hands, a hint of a belt. Along the moat toward the east runs a second chain of balbals, which gave I. Lisi a cause to suggest that they circled the fence wall of the monument. However, it is likely that it is another chain belonging to another deceased buried earlier".

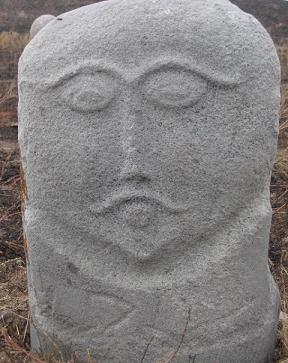
A Turkic balbal near Burana Tower in Kyrgyzstan, 6th-7th century CE

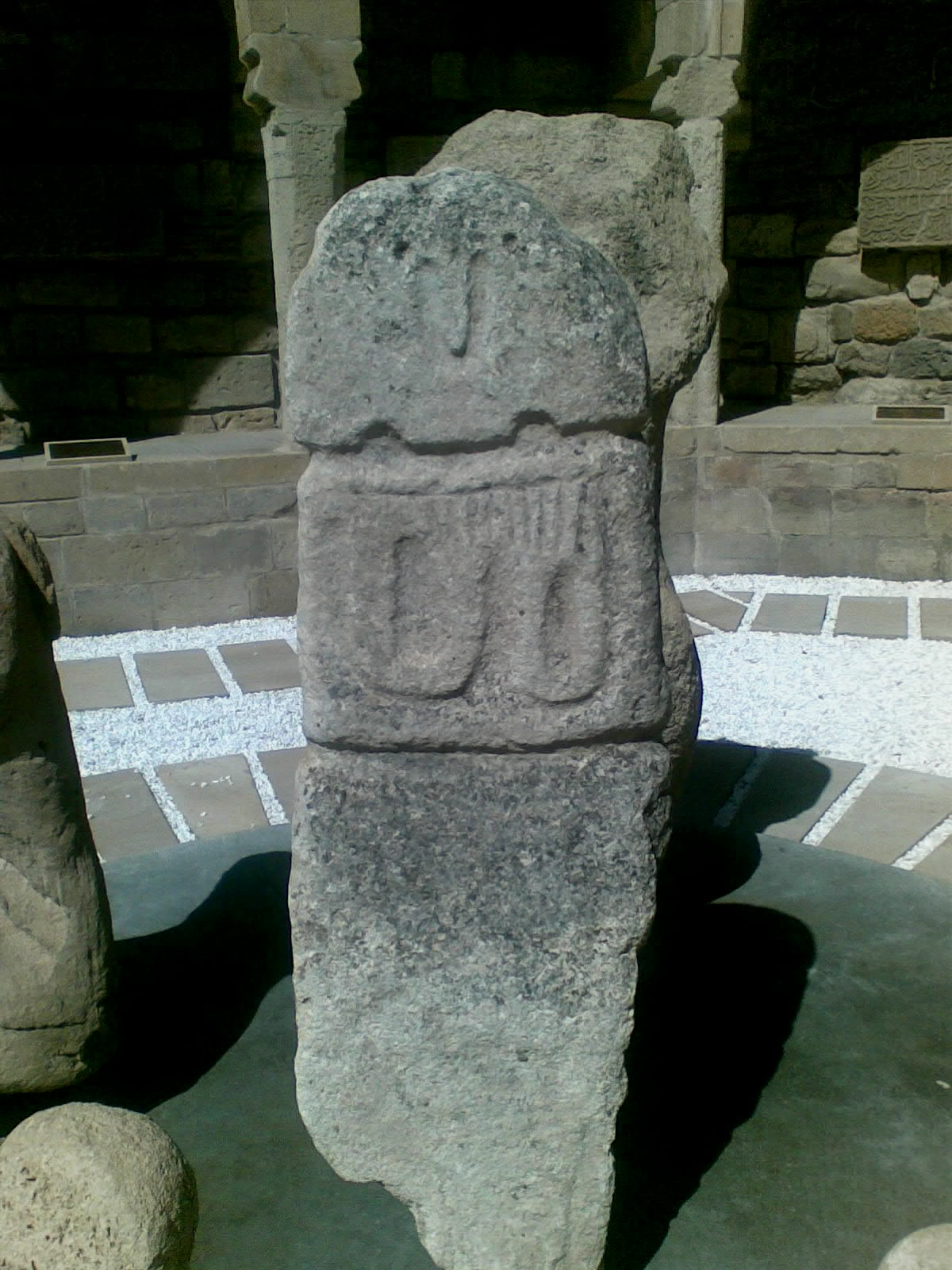
Stone stele found in Boyahmadli village of Ağdam region of Azerbaijan

Some kurgan obelisks are found still standing on kurgans, others were found buried in the slopes. Not always can be stated if they were contemporary with the kurgans on which they stand, existed earlier, or were carved later and lifted onto the kurgan. Kurgan obelisks are of sandstone, limestone, granite, etc. Their height is from 3.5 m to 0.7 m, but more often 1.5–2 m. Some of them are simple stone columns, with a rough image of a human face, on others the head (with the narrowed neck) is clearly depicted; in most cases not only the head is depicted, but also body, arms, and frequently both legs, and headdress, and dress. On more crude statues is impossible to discern sex, but mostly it is expressed clearly: men are with moustaches (sometimes with beard, one bearded kurgan obelisk is in the courtyard of the Historical Museum in Moscow), in a costume with metal breastplates and belts, sometimes with a sword, etc.; women are with bared breasts, wearing peculiar headdresses, with girdles or necklaces on the neck, etc.

Other obelisks show figures completely naked and usually only their head is covered, and legs are shod. Kurgan statues are sitting (frequently females), and standing (mostly males); in both cases the legs are not depicted. If the legs are depicted, they are either barefoot, or more often shoed, in high or low boots (bashmaks), sometimes with distinguishable trousers with ornaments. Many female kurgan obelisks (and some male) are naked above the belt, but below a belt and dress are visible, sometimes two dresses, one longer underneath, and another on the top, as a semi-'kaftan' or a short furcoat, with appliques and inserts (the ornaments of inserts consist of geometrical lines, double spirals, etc., or even cuirass). Others have stripes on the shoulders, many have two stripes (seldom three, or one wide across), plates (apparently, metal) on the breast attached to a belt or, more often, to two belts. On the belt sometimes is possible to distinguish a buckle in the middle or thongs hanging from it with sometimes attached bag, a round metal pocket mirror, knife, comb, sometimes also is shown (male statues) a dagger or a straight sword, a bow, a ‘kolchan’ (quiver), a hook, an axe. On the neck the men wear a metal band, women wear a necklace of beads or scales, sometimes even 2 or 3 are visible, some have a wide tape or a belt dropping from the necklace, ending with a 4-corner cloth. On the hands, wrists and shoulders (especially for nude figures) are bracelets (rings) and cuffs, in the ears, for women and men, are earrings, on the head (forehead) sometimes is an ornamental bandage or a diadem. The female braids can not always be distinguished from ribbons or bandages, they also are depicted for men. In some cases the male hat undoubtedly represents a small helmet (‘misyurka’), sometimes with crossing metal strips. The female headdress is more diverse, like a hat with curved brims, ‘bashlyk’, Kyrgyz (Kazakh) hat, etc.

The type of the face is not always depicted clearly. The vast majority of women join hands on the navel or at the bottom of the stomach, and hold a vessel, frequently cylindrical, like a cup or a glass. Sometimes it is so blurred that it can be taken for a folded scarf. One male figurine holds a bowl in the left hand, and a sword in the right; and another has hands simply joined, without a bowl, one female figurine holds a ring, some hold a rhyton (drinking horn).

== Destruction ==
Several Cuman kurgan stelae from the 9th to 13th centuries located at the Ukrainian site of Izium were destroyed by Russian forces in March and April 2022 when they occupied the area for six months during the 2022 Russian invasion of Ukraine.

== See also ==
- Urfa Man (9000 BCE)
- Dol hareubang
- Deer stone – Megaliths found largely in Siberia and Mongolia
- Scythian art
- Statue menhir
- Göbekli Tepe – Neolithic archaeological site in Turkey
- Arco stelae

== Bibliography ==
- "Catalogue of stone obelisks". Archeological Encyclopedia (in Russian). Archived from the original on 9 October 2006 – via Sati.archaeilogy.nsc.ru.
- Arslanova, F.Kh.; Charikov, A.A. (1974). "Stone obelisks of upper Irtysh". Soviet Archeology (in Russian) (3).
- Bayar, D. (1994). Stone obelisks of Mongolia (in Korean). Seoul, KO.
- Bayar, D. (1997). Stone statues in Central region of Mongolia (in Mongolian). Ulaanbaatar, Mongolia.
- Charikov, A.A. (1974). "Early middle age sculptures in eastern Kazakhstan". Soviet Archeology (in Russian) (4).
- Evtükhova, L.A. (1945). Stone obelisks of Northern Altai. Works of State Historical Museum (in Russian). Vol. 16. Moscow, RU.
- Evtükhova, L.A. (1952). Stone obelisks of Southern Siberia and Mongolia. MIA (in Russian). Vol. 24.
- Grach, A.D. (1961). Ancient Türkic obelisks in Tuva (in Russian). Moscow, RU.
- Harrison, R.; Heyd, V. (2007). "The transformation of Europe in the third millennium BC: The example of 'le petit-chasseur I + III' (Sion, Valais, Switzerland)". Praehistorische Zeitschrift. 82 (2): 129–214. doi:10.1515/PZ.2007.010.
- Ismagulov, O. (2006). Skulls from stone tiled kurgans (Central Kazakhstan). Nomads (in Russian). Vol. 1. Pavlodar EKO. ISBN 978-9965-635-21-2.
- Kazakevich, V.A. (1930). Grave statues in Darigang (in Russian). Leningrad, RU.
- Khalilov, M.Dj. (1988). Stone obelisks of Azerbaijan (2nd half of 1st millennium BC – 1st millennium AD) (in Azerbaijani). Moscow, RU.
- Kovalev, Alexey (2012). Ancient statue-menhirs in Chemurchek and surrounding territories 2012 (Древнейшие статуи Чемурчека и окружающих территорий 2012) (Naučn. izd ed.). Sankt-Peterburg: LDPrint. ISBN 978-5-905585-03-6.
- Kubarev, V.D. (1979). Ancient obelisks in Altai. Deer slabs (in Russian). Novosibirsk, RU.
- Kubarev, V.D. (1984). Ancient Türkic obelisks in Altai (in Russian). Novosibirsk, RU.
- Kyzlasov, L.R. (1969). History of Tuva in Middle Ages (in Russian). Moscow, RU: Moscow University Press.
- Novgorodova, E.; Pechersky, A. (1986). "Early Middle Age sculptures of Kipchaks". Bulletin of International Association for Study of Central Asian Cultures (in Russian). Moscow, RU.
- Ol'khovskiy, V.S.; Evdokimov, G.L. (1994). Scythian sculptures of the 7th – 3rd centuries BC. Skifskie izvayaniya VII–III vv. do n.e. (in Russian). Moscow, RU: MTO METEO Publ.
- Pletneva, S.A. (1974). "Kipchak stone obelisks". Coll. of Archeological Sources. SAI Science (in Russian). No. E 4–2. Moscow, RU.
- Pletneva, S.A. (1972). Antiques of Black Klobuks (Oguzes) (in Russian). Moscow, RU.
- Robb, J. (September 2009). "People of stone: Stelae, personhood, and society in prehistoric Europe". Journal of Archaeological Method and Theory. 16 (3): 162–183. doi:10.1007/s10816-009-9066-z.
- Sher, A.Ya. (1966). Stone obelisks of Jeti-su (in Russian). Moscow, RU.
- Telegin, D.Ya. (1994). The Anthropomorphic Stelae of the Ukraine (in Russian).
- Uvarov, Aleksey (1869). "Сведения о К. бабах" [Overview of Stone Babas]. ru:Трудах I Моск. арх. съезда. 1st Moscow Archaeological Congress (in Russian). with 2 tables)
- Veselovsky, N.I. (1915). Современное состояние вопроса о «каменных бабах» или «балбалах» [The current state of the question of the 'stone babas' or 'balbals']. Notes of the Odessa Society of History and Antiquities (in Ukrainian). 33. Odessa, UK.
- Yudin, A.I. (2007). Evolution of social organization of Timber-grave society in late cultural stage (example of Novopokrovka 2 kurgan burial). 16th Ural archeological conference (in Russian). Ekaterinburg, RU. ISBN 978-5-903594-04-7.

=== 19th-century publications ===
- Hartman (1892). "Becherstatuen in Ostpreussen und die Literatur der Becherstatuen" [Beaker statues in east Prussia and the literature of the cup statues]. Archiv für Anthropologie (in German). 21.
- "Brockhaus-Efron Small Encyclopaedic Dictionary (1890–1916)" – via Cultinfo.ru.
