= Jangy-Chek =

Jangy-Chek Жаңы-Чек
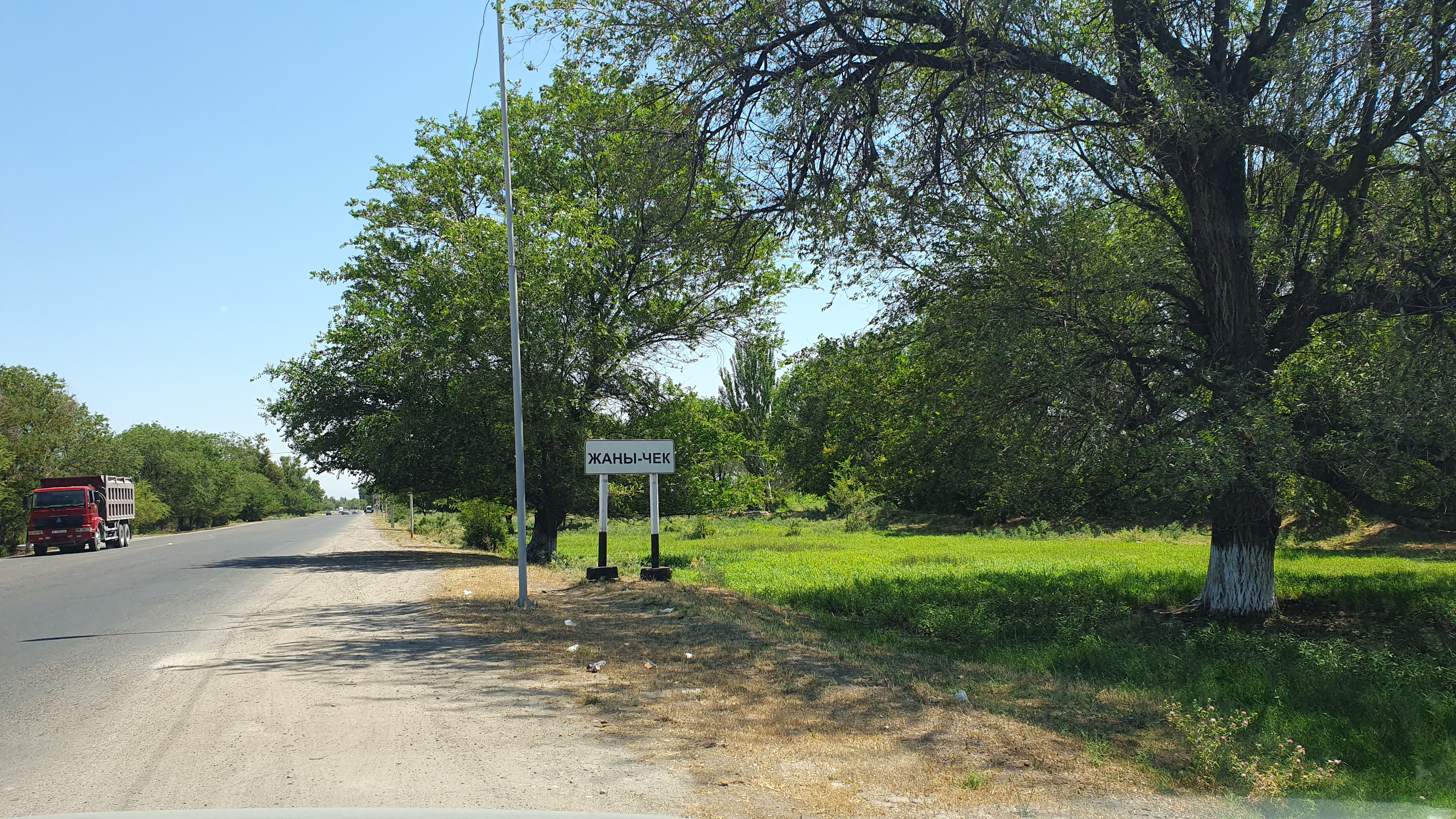

- Location within Kyrgyzstan
- Coordinates: 42°48′50″N 75°21′10″E
- Country: Kyrgyzstan
- Region: Chüy Region
- District: Chüy District
- Elevation: 860 m (2,820 ft)

Population (2021)
  - Total: 557

Jangy-Chek is a village in the Chüy Region of Kyrgyzstan. Its population was 557 in 2021.
