= Chüy, Kyrgyzstan =

Chüy Чүй
- Village
- Location within Kyrgyzstan
- Coordinates: 42°48′36″N 75°16′48″E
- Country: Kyrgyzstan
- Region: Chüy
- District: Chüy
- Established: 1928
- Elevation: 821 m (2,694 ft)

Population (2021)
  - Total: 12,688

Chüy (Kyrgyz: Чүй, Russian: Чуй) is a village in the Chüy Region of Kyrgyzstan. It is part of the Chüy District. Its population was 12,688 in 2021. It is adjacent to the former regional capital, the city of Tokmok.

Since Chüy is adjacent to Tokmok, the two settlements together are sometimes informally referred to as the "city of Chüy-Tokmok" (Чүй-Токмок; sometimes, Chuy-Tokmak, Чуй-Токмак).

== Population ==
Historical population
Year	Pop.	±% p.a.
2009	11,535	—
2021	12,688	+0.80%
Note: resident population; Sources:
