= Van Museum =

- Van müzesi
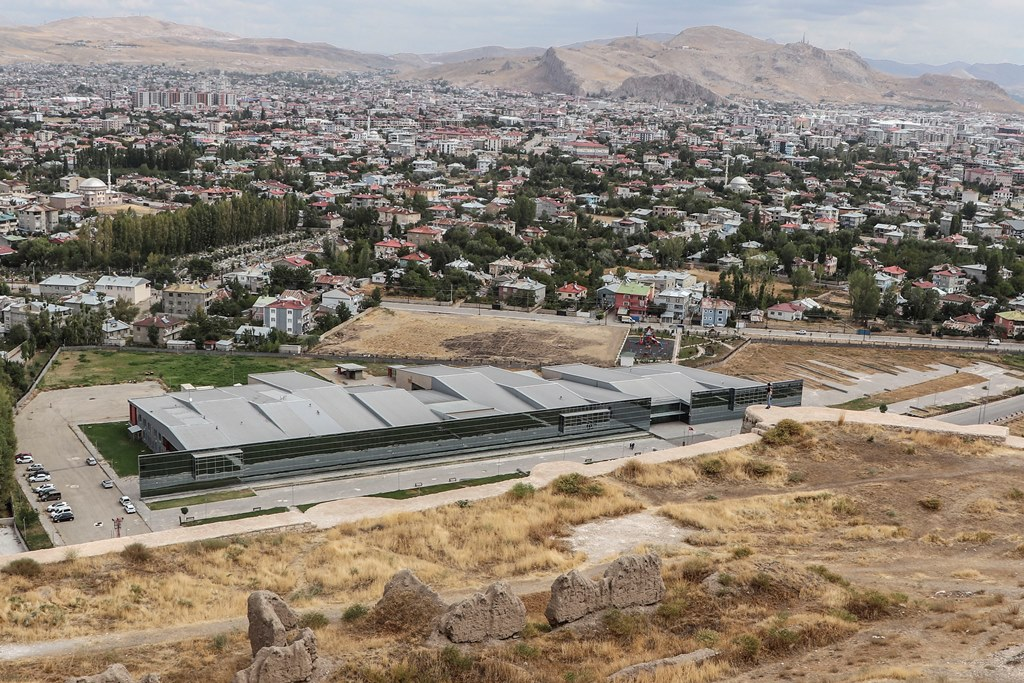

- Location of Van Museum
- Established: 1945
- Location: Van, Turkey
- Coordinates: 38.50472°N 43.34111°E
- Type: House museum, Archeological museum, Ethnographic museum
- Website: Van Museum

The Van Museum or Urartu Museum (Turkish: Van müzesi) is a museum located in the city of Van in eastern Turkey. It showcases on 13,000 m^{2} a large archaeological and ethnographic record of human life and cultural development in the lake Van region from eastern Anatolia’s Stone Age to the present. The main focus of the museum is on the Urartian period, about 2800-2600 years ago. Of particular interest are the Hakkari kurgan stelae.

== History ==
The museum was founded in 1945. In 2011 it was affected by two earthquakes and a new building was constructed, located near the Van Fortress. It was opened to the public in 2019.

== Collection ==
The oldest archaeological items of the museum are from the Palaeolithic, Neolithic and Chalcolithic periods, including obsidian and bone tools from the archaeological sites of Tilkitepe and Kızdami. Another series of finds are from the Karagündüz necropolis.

Among the artefacts from the Urartu kingdom, which originated in the 9th century BCE and became a civilisation that excelled in art, technology and metallurgy until its demise in the 6th century BCE, are weapons, everyday objects and stelae with sculptural decoration and cuneiform inscriptions. Other items belong to the Roman, Byzantine, Seljuk, Aq Qoyunlu, Qara Qoyunlu and Ottoman period. Among the pieces from the Seljuk period, tombs shaped as rams and sheep are particularly noteworthy.

There is a large ethnographic collection of kilims and rugs but without mentioning the rich local Kurdish tradition of this craft.

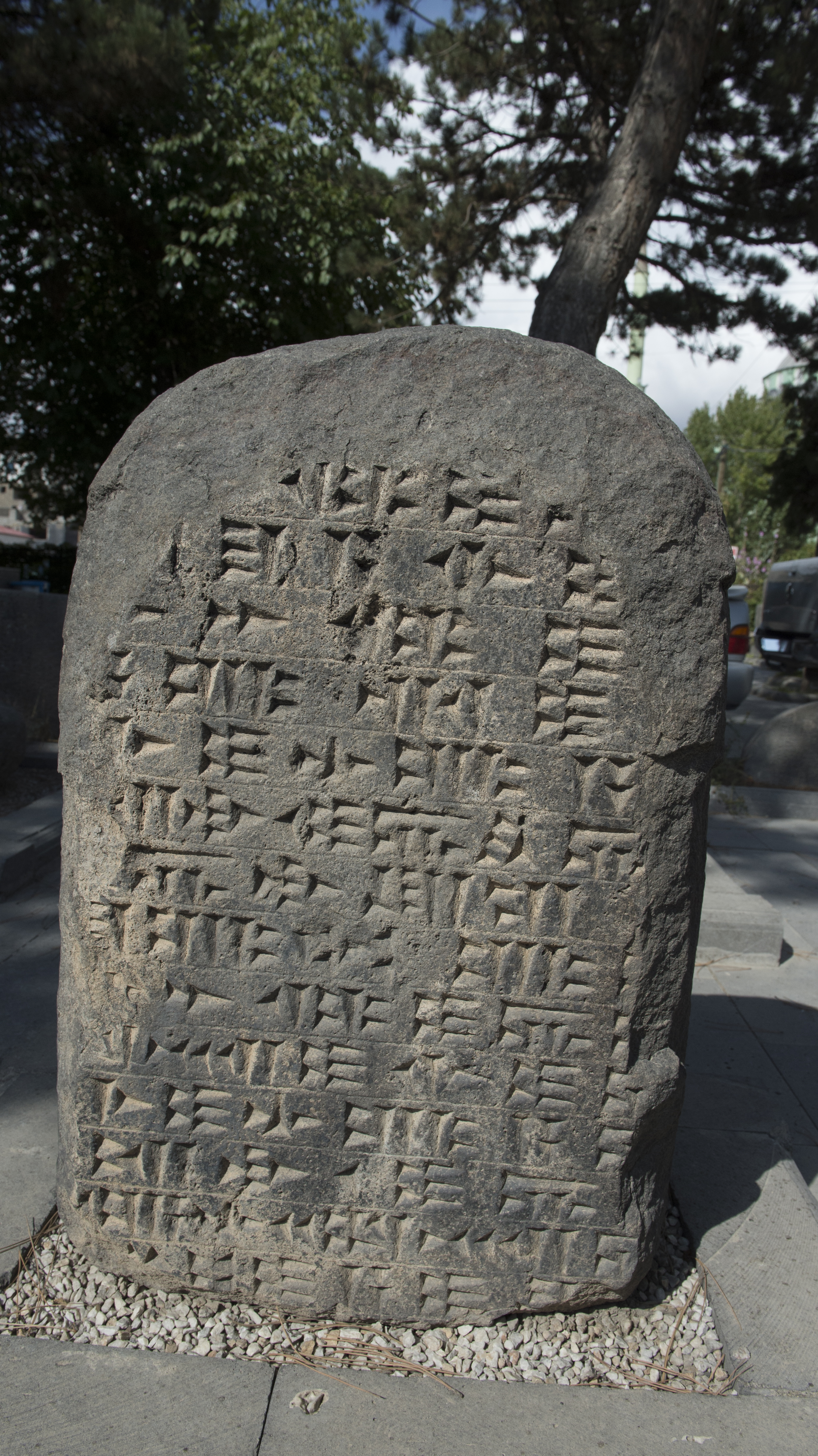
Urartian stone inscriptions

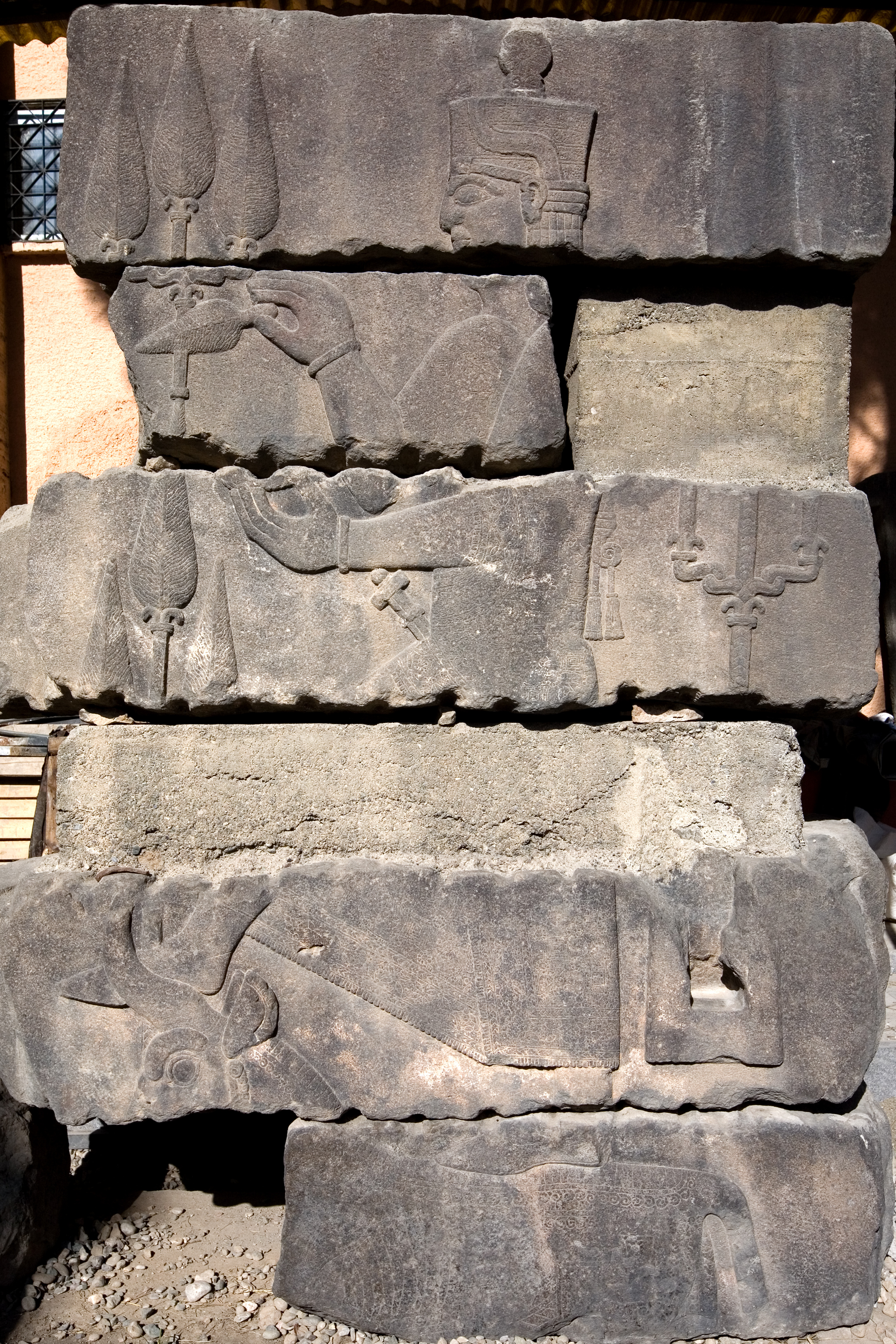
God Teisheba on the bull, relief

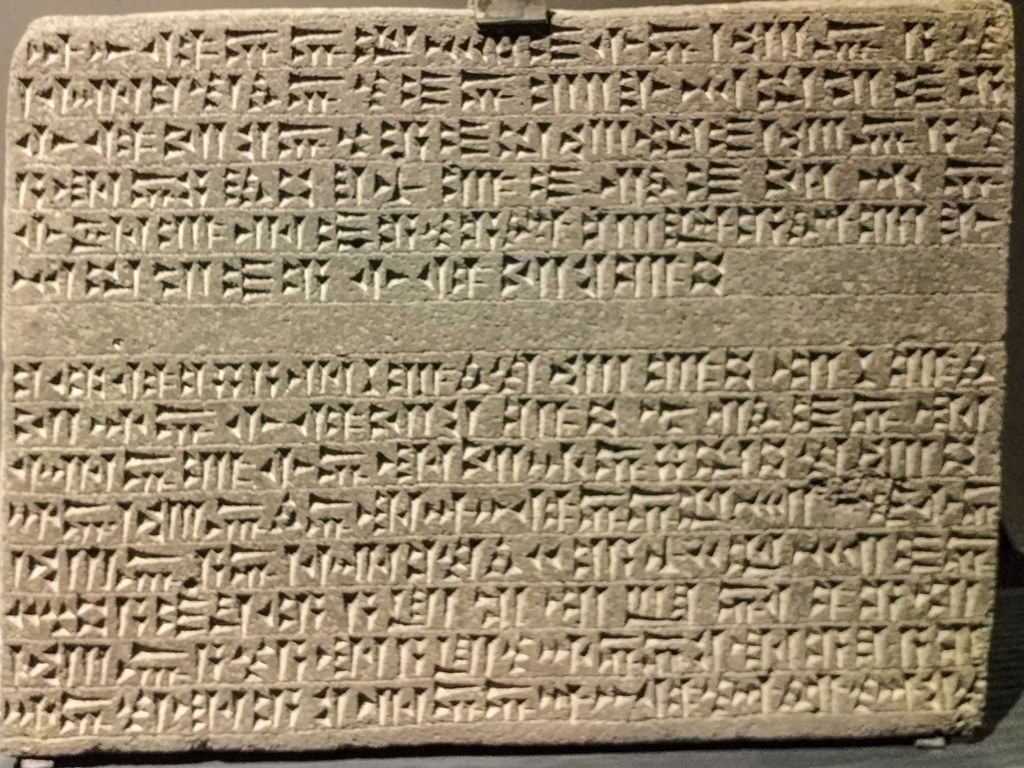
Inscription Ayanis Fortress

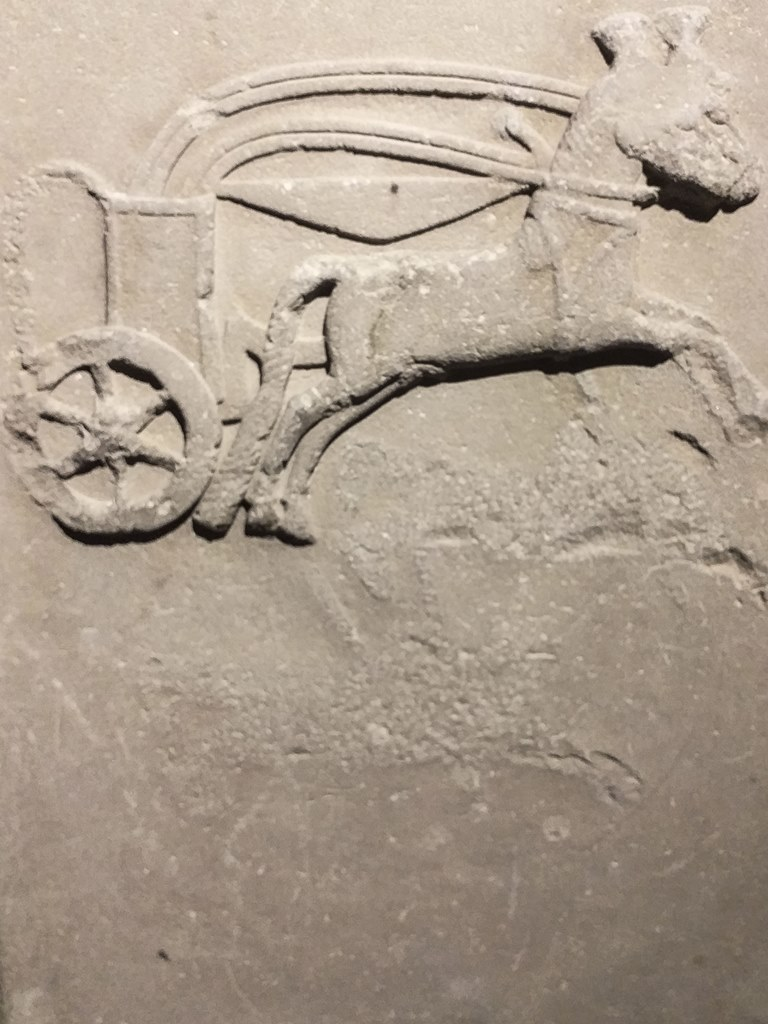
Urartian war chariot

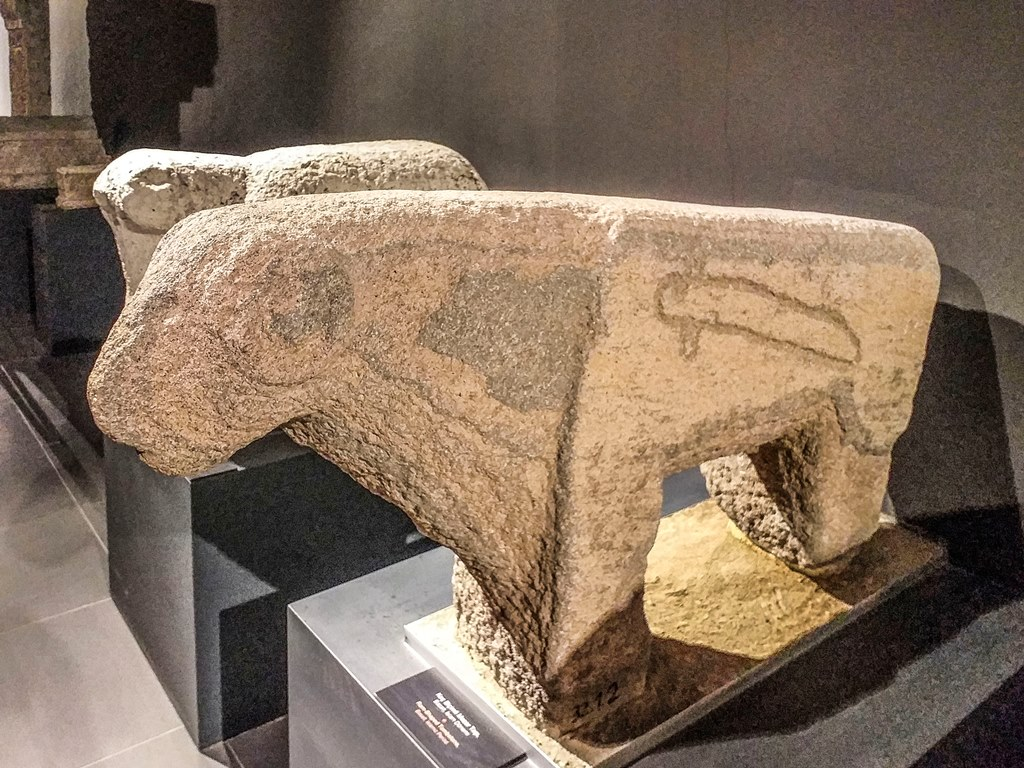
Seljuk tombs shaped as rams

== Hakkari Stelae ==
Thirteen Kurgan stelae were found in 1998 in their original location at the centre of Hakkari. Eleven stelae depict armed warrior-men and two represent women without arms. The stelae were carved on upright flagstone-like limestone slabs measuring between 0.7 m to 3.10 m in height. The stones contain only one cut surface. Each stele features the fore view of an upper human body. The legs are not depicted. The earliest stelae are in the style of bas relief while the latest ones are in a linear style. They were manufactured during a period from the 15th c. BCE to the 11th c. BCE in Hakkari.

The warrior-men, always holding a drinking vessel in their upraised right hand, are equipped with weapons and wear a dagger suspended on a belt. Remaining areas of the stelae are filled with small-sized animals or feature yurts of the Asian steppes thus indicating the nomadic or semi nomadic nature of a society that lived across this rugged landscape of Hakkari. Some stelae have both eyes inlaid.

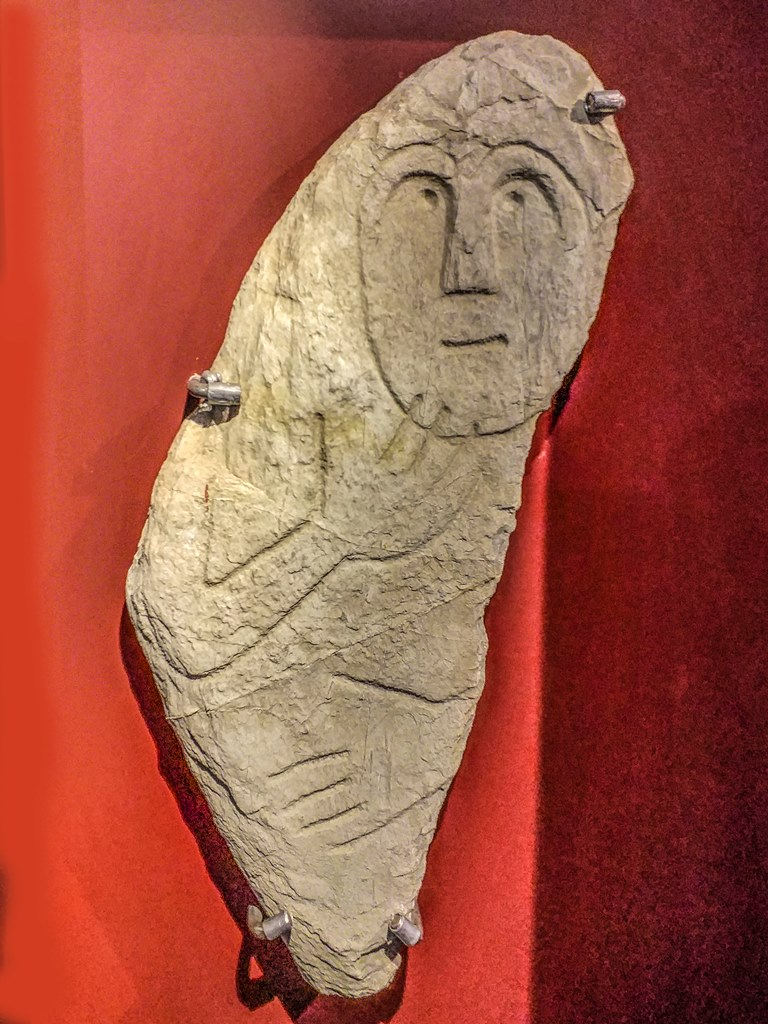
Unarmed woman

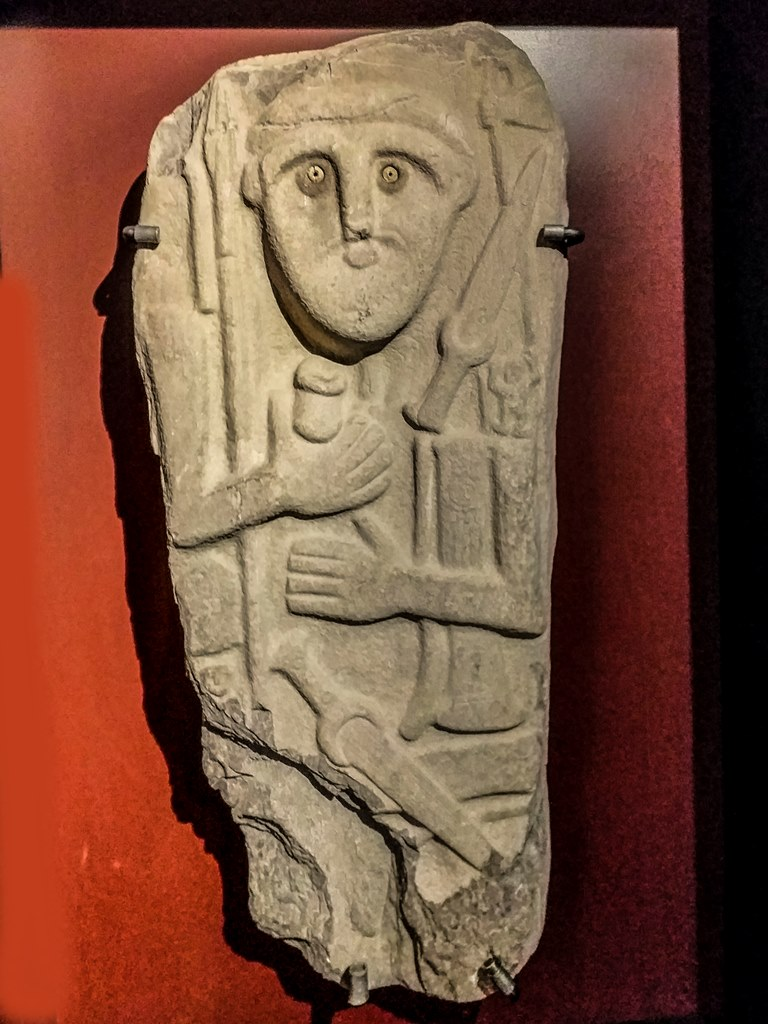
Warrior man equipped with weapons and tools. Both eyes are inlaid

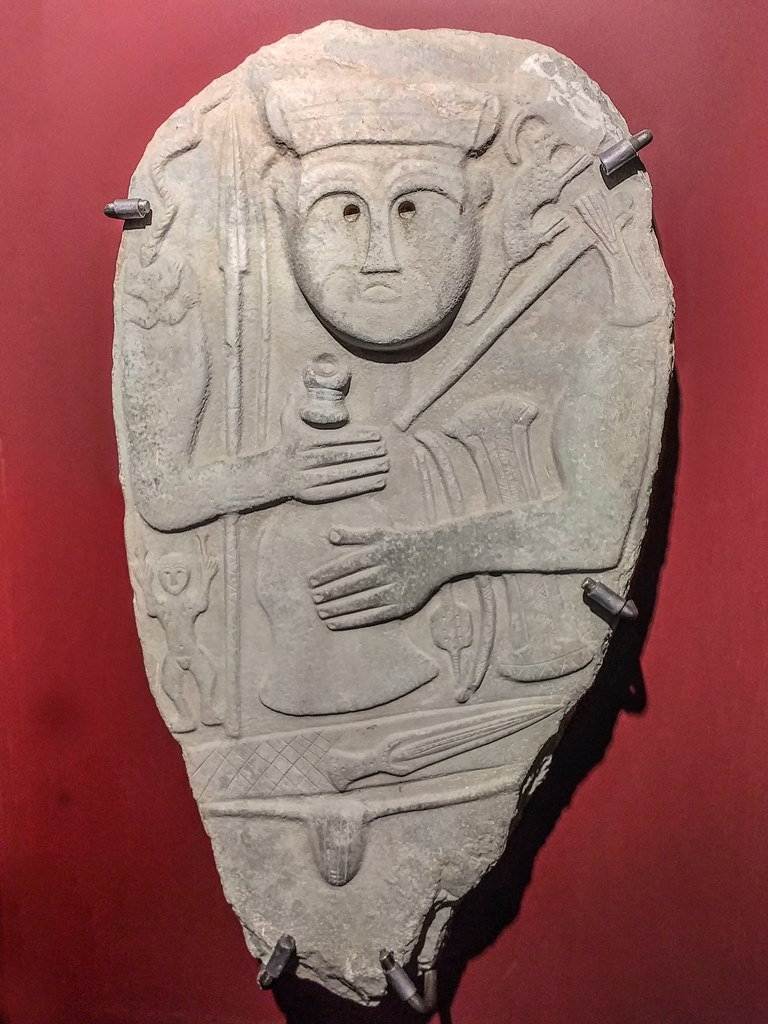
Armed warrior man wearing a cap

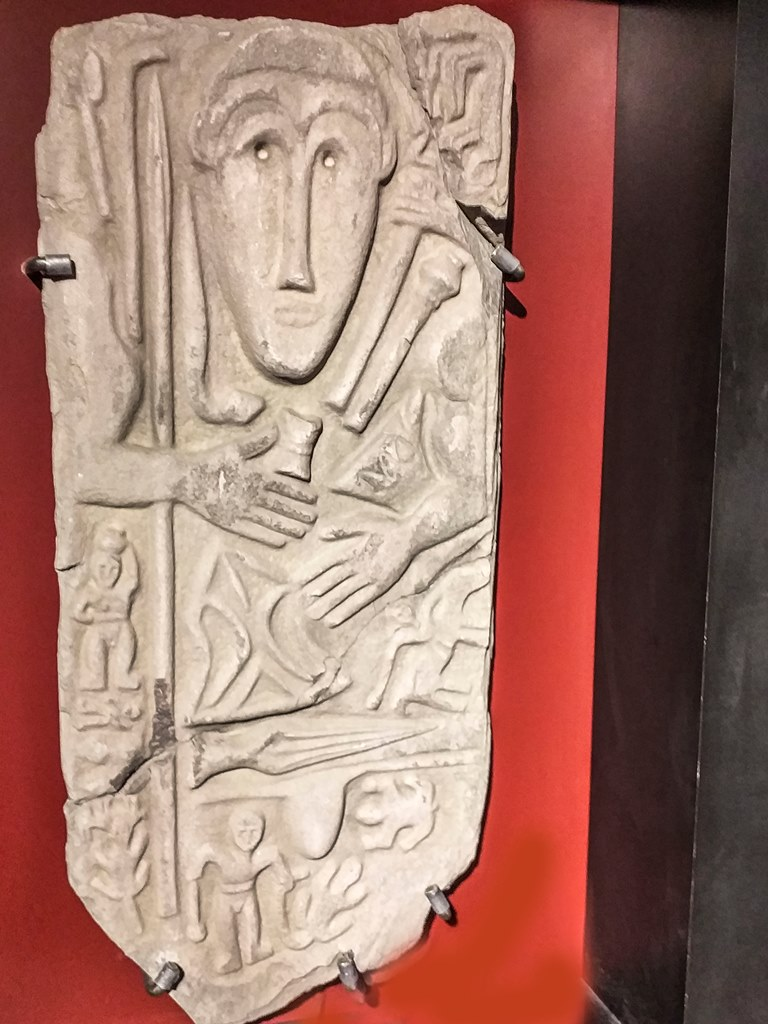
Armed warrior man. Below his right elbow a woman figure
