= Madaniyat, Chüy =

Madaniyat Маданият
- Location within Kyrgyzstan
- Coordinates: 42°42′27″N 75°26′55″E
- Country: Kyrgyzstan
- Region: Chüy Region
- District: Chüy District
- Elevation: 1,429 m (4,688 ft)

Population (2021)
  - Total: 667

Madaniyat is a village in the Chüy District of Chüy Region of Kyrgyzstan. Its population was 667 in 2021.
