= Shamshy (river) =

Coordinates: 42°45′N 75°19′E

- Native name: Шамшы (Kyrgyz)

Location
- Country: Kyrgyzstan
- Region: Chüy Region
- District: Chüy District

Physical characteristics
- Mouth: Chu
- Length: 58 km (36 mi)
- Basin size: 475 km^{2} (183 sq mi)
- Discharge
  - location: mouth
  - average: 5.08 m^{3}/s (179 cu ft/s)
  - minimum: 0.82 m^{3}/s (29 cu ft/s)
  - maximum: 48.1 m^{3}/s (1,700 cu ft/s)

Basin features
- Progression: Chu→ Betpak-Dala desert

The Shamshy (Kyrgyz: Шамшы) is a river in Chüy District of Chüy Region of Kyrgyzstan. It is a left tributary of the Chu. The river is 58 km (36 mi) long, and has a watershed area of 475 km^{2} (183 sq mi). The annual average flow rate in mid-stream is 5.08 m^{3}/s (179 cu ft/s), maximum flow rate 48.1 m^{3}/s (1,700 cu ft/s) - in August, and minimum flow rate 0.82 m^{3}/s (29 cu ft/s) - in February. The largest tributary of Shamshy is Tuyuk river (length 24 km (15 mi) km, and watershed area - 177 km^{2} (68 sq mi)). There are 23 glaciers in the river basin with area of 31 km (19 mi). The river rises from glaciers on the northern slopes of Kyrgyz Ala-Too, flows through a narrow gorge northward, and enters Chüy Valley. Shamshy is linked to the Great Chüy Canal. The river is used for irrigation.
