= Kosh-Kashat =

Kosh-Kashat Кош-Кашат
- Location within Kyrgyzstan
- Coordinates: 42°41′11″N 75°22′33″E
- Country: Kyrgyzstan
- Region: Chüy Region
- District: Chüy District

Population (2021)
  - Total: 500

Kosh-Kashat (Kyrgyz: Кош-Кашат) is a village in the Chüy District of Chüy Region in Kyrgyzstan. The population of the village was 500 in 2021.
