= Iskra, Chüy =

Iskra Искра
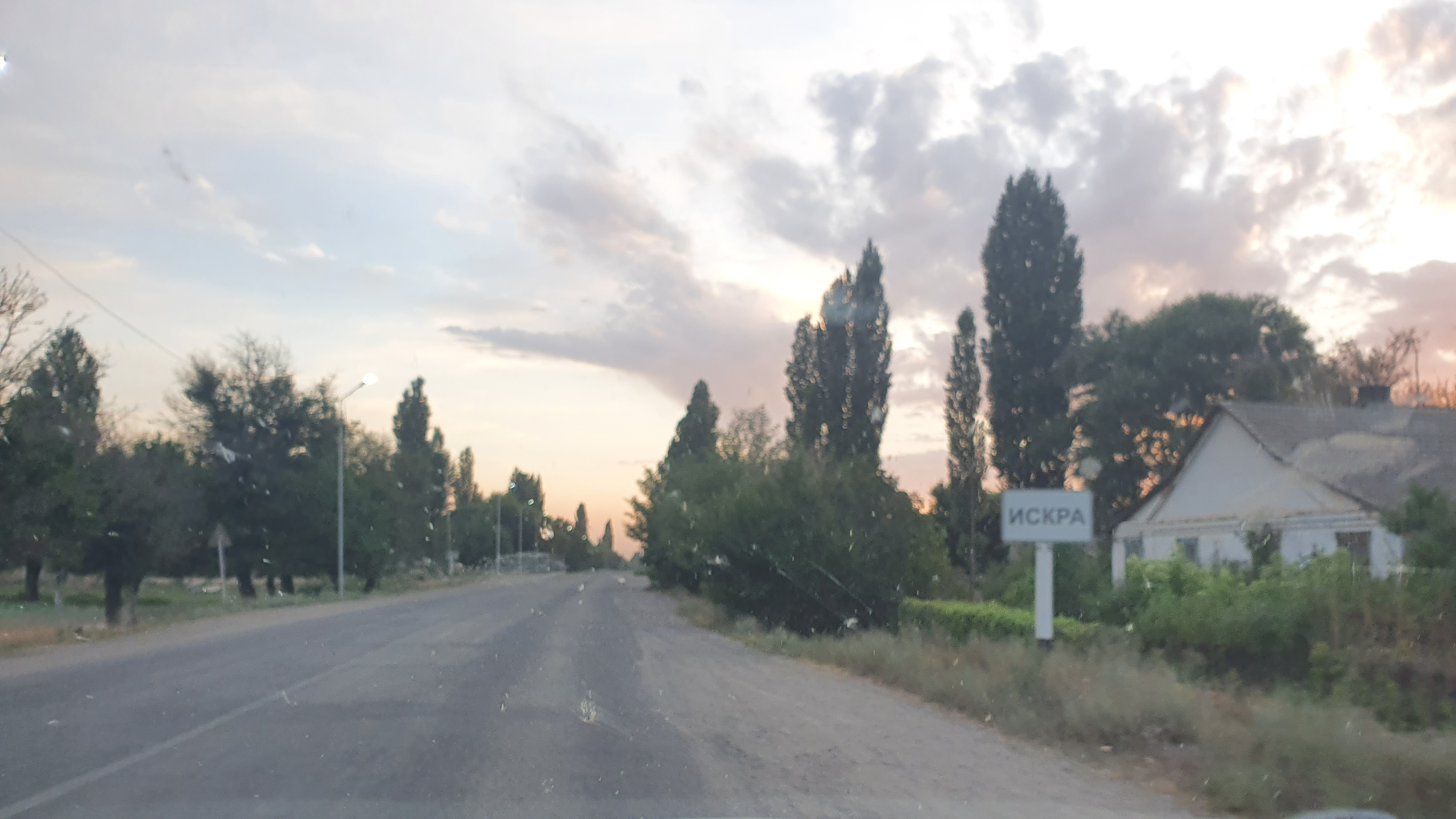

- Location within Kyrgyzstan
- Coordinates: 42°48′37″N 75°26′52″E
- Country: Kyrgyzstan
- Region: Chüy Region
- District: Chüy District

Area
  - Total: 0.5 km^{2} (0.19 sq mi)
- Elevation: 922 m (3,025 ft)

Population (2021)
  - Total: 3,065
- Time zone: UTC+6

Iskra (Kyrgyz: Искра) is a village in the Chüy District of Chüy Region of Kyrgyzstan. Its population was 3,065 in 2021. The population of Iskra village amounted to 2,353 in 2006, including 1,403 Dungans, 875 Kyrgyzs, and 73 - other nationalities. The inter-ethnic conflict between Dungans and Kyrgyzs took place in Iskra village in February 2006. The incident caused 6 people were injured and many houses damaged.
