= Ak-Beshim, Chüy =

Ak-Beshim Ак-Бешим
- Location within Kyrgyzstan
- Coordinates: 42°48′48″N 75°14′30″E
- Country: Kyrgyzstan
- Region: Chüy Region
- District: Chüy District
- Elevation: 814 m (2,671 ft)

Population (2021)
  - Total: 3,391

Ak-Beshim (Kyrgyz: Ак-Бешим) is a village in the Chüy District, Chüy Region, Kyrgyzstan. The population of the village was 3,391 in 2021. It is the center of Ak-Beshim rural community (ayyl aymagy).
