= Burana, Kyrgyzstan =

Burana
- Location within Kyrgyzstan Location within West and Central Asia
- Coordinates: 42°45′0″N 75°16′10″E
- Country: Kyrgyzstan
- Region: Chüy Region
- District: Chüy District
- Elevation: 940 m (3,080 ft)

Population (2021)
  - Total: 772

Burana is a village in the Chüy Region of Kyrgyzstan. Its population was 772 in 2021. It is most famous for the Burana Tower and the associated ruins of Balasagun located near it.

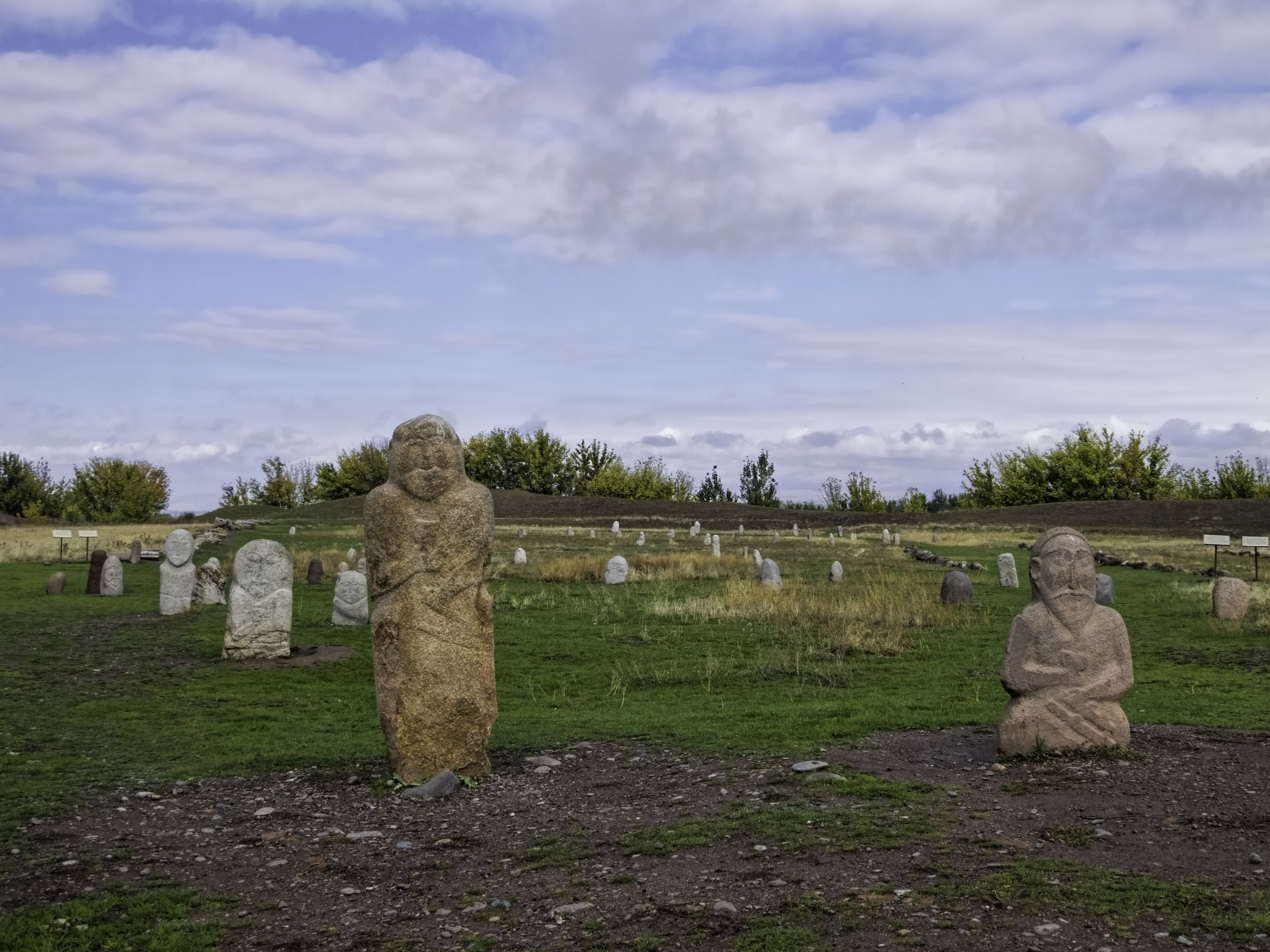
Turkic balbal tomstones, Burana, 6-10th century CE

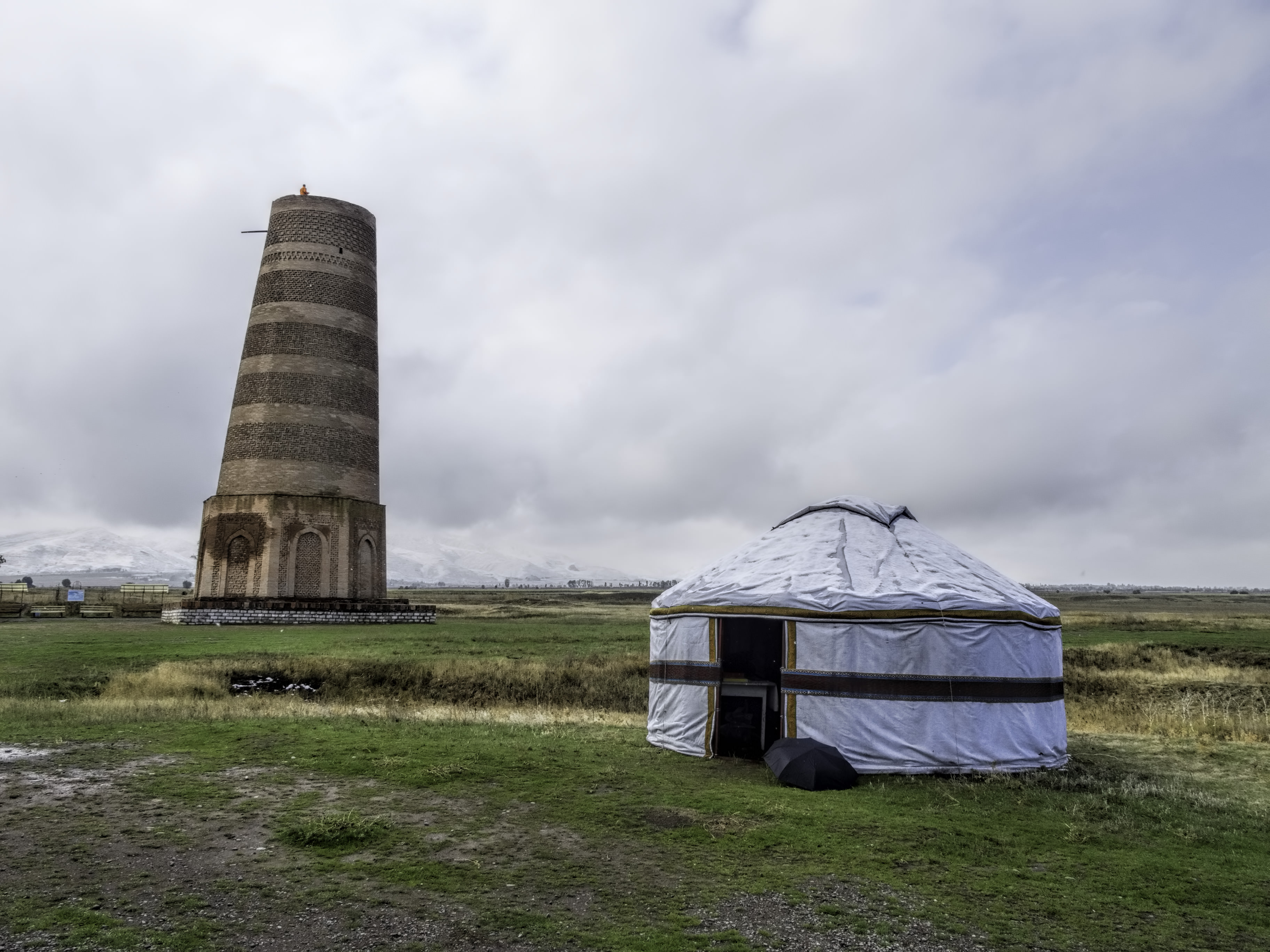
Burna tower, 11th century
