= Akmatbek, Chüy =

Akmatbek Акматбек Plokhotnikovo
- Location within Kyrgyzstan
- Coordinates: 42°43′08″N 75°11′37″E
- Country: Kyrgyzstan
- Region: Chüy Region
- District: Chüy District
- Elevation: 1,108 m (3,635 ft)

Population (2021)
  - Total: 202

Akmatbek (Kyrgyz: Акматбек) is a village in the Chüy District of Chüy Region, Kyrgyzstan. The village was known as Plokhotnikovo until 2002. Its population was 202 in 2021. The village belongs to Kegeti rural community (ayyl aymagy).
