= Saylyk =

Saylyk Сайлык
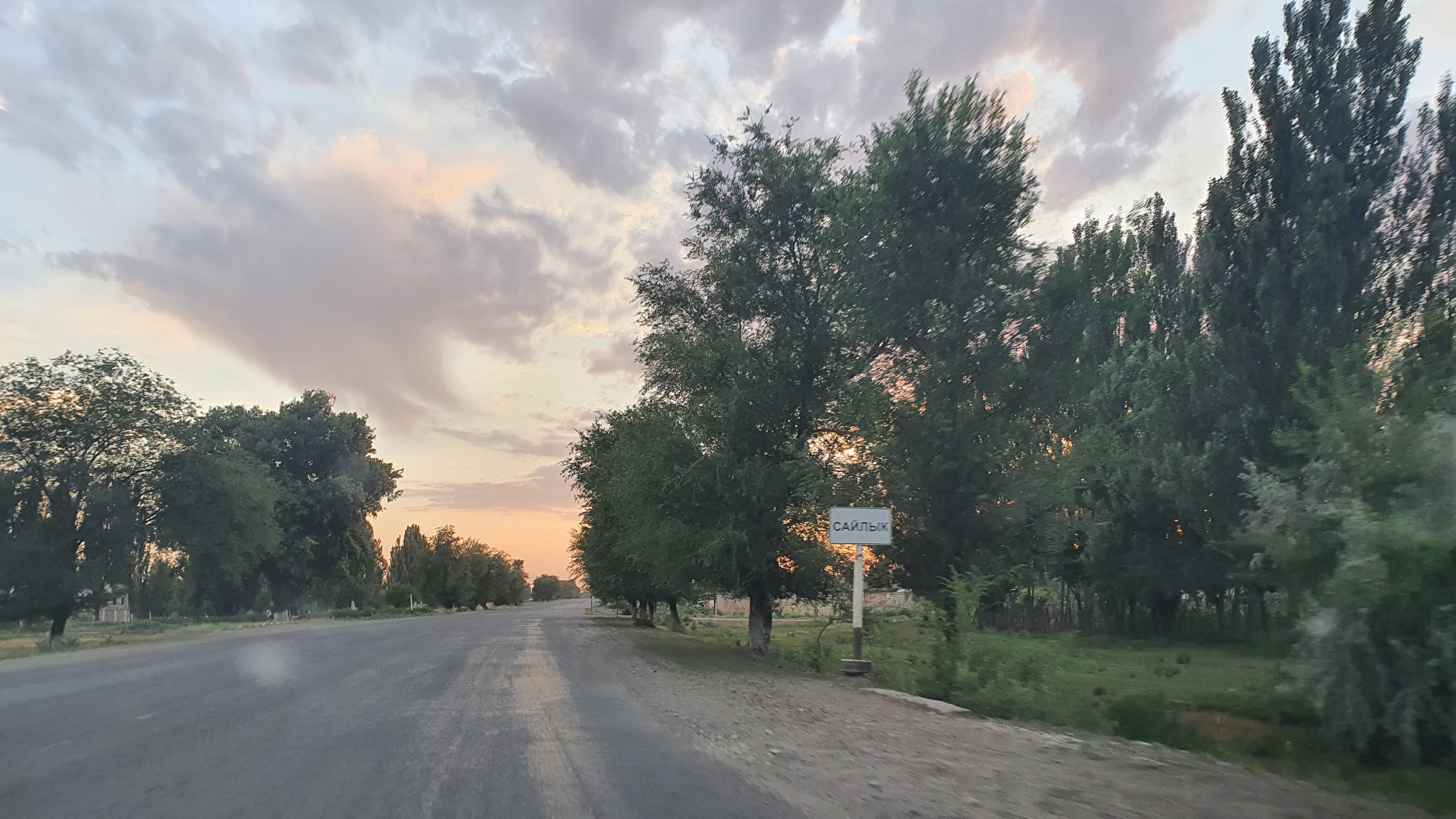

- Location within Kyrgyzstan
- Coordinates: 42°48′33″N 75°22′47″E
- Country: Kyrgyzstan
- Region: Chüy Region
- District: Chüy District
- Established: 1929

Area
  - Total: 0.5 km^{2} (0.19 sq mi)
- Elevation: 879 m (2,884 ft)

Population (2021)
  - Total: 1,384

Saylyk is a village in the Chüy District of Chüy Region of Kyrgyzstan. Its population was 1,384 in 2021. The village was established in 1929.
