= Arpa-Tektir, Chüy =

Arpa-Tektir Арпа-Тектир
- Location within Kyrgyzstan
- Coordinates: 42°37′44″N 75°09′48″E
- Country: Kyrgyzstan
- Region: Chüy Region
- District: Chüy District
- Elevation: 1,615 m (5,299 ft)

Population (2021)
  - Total: 843

Arpa-Tektir (Kyrgyz: Арпа-Тектир) is a village in the Chüy District of Chüy Region, Kyrgyzstan. Its population was 843 in 2021. The village is subordinated to Kegeti rural community (ayyl aymagy).
