= Progress, Chüy =

Progress Прогресс
- Location within Kyrgyzstan
- Coordinates: 42°43′28″N 75°23′27″E
- Country: Kyrgyzstan
- Region: Chüy Region
- District: Chüy District
- Elevation: 1,175 m (3,855 ft)

Population (2021)
  - Total: 2,591

Progress is a village in the Chüy District of Chüy Region of Kyrgyzstan. Its population was 2,591 in 2021.
