= Alga, Chüy =

Alga Алга
- Location within Kyrgyzstan
- Coordinates: 42°45′59″N 75°18′54″E
- Country: Kyrgyzstan
- Region: Chüy Region
- District: Chüy District

Area
  - Total: 1 km^{2} (0.39 sq mi)
- Elevation: 965 m (3,166 ft)

Population (2021)
  - Total: 979

Alga is a village in the Chüy District of Chüy Region of Kyrgyzstan. Its population was 979 in 2021.
