= Kosh-Korgon =

Kosh-Korgon Кош-Коргон
- Location within Kyrgyzstan
- Coordinates: 42°45′13″N 75°25′40″E
- Country: Kyrgyzstan
- Region: Chüy Region
- District: Chüy District
- Established: 1936

Area
  - Total: 0.8 km^{2} (0.31 sq mi)

Population (2021)
  - Total: 2,317

Kosh-Korgon (Kyrgyz: Кош-Коргон) is a village in the Chüy District, Chüy Region, Kyrgyzstan. Its population was 2,317 in 2021. It is the center and the only village in Koshkorgon rural community (ayyl aymagy).
