= Kayyrma, Chüy =

Kayyrma Кайырма
- Location within Kyrgyzstan
- Coordinates: 42°41′35″N 75°23′48″E
- Country: Kyrgyzstan
- Region: Chüy Region
- District: Chüy District
- Elevation: 1,280 m (4,200 ft)

Population (2021)
  - Total: 1,033

Kayyrma is a village in the Chüy District of Chüy Region of Kyrgyzstan. Its population was 1,033 in 2021.
