= Chapaev, Chüy =

Chapaev Чапаев
- Location within Kyrgyzstan
- Coordinates: 42°43′37″N 75°10′49″E
- Country: Kyrgyzstan
- Region: Chüy Region
- District: Chüy District
- Elevation: 1,085 m (3,560 ft)

Population (2021)
  - Total: 871

Chapaev (Kyrgyz: Чапаев) is a village in the Chüy District of the Chüy Region in Kyrgyzstan. Its population was 871 in 2021. The village belongs to Kegeti rural community (ayyl aymagy).
