= Döng-Aryk =

Döng-Aryk Дөң-Арык
- village
- Location within Kyrgyzstan
- Coordinates: 42°45′01″N 75°12′58″E
- Country: Kyrgyzstan
- Region: Chüy Region
- District: Chüy District
- Established: 1929
- Elevation: 965 m (3,166 ft)

Population (2021)
  - Total: 3,486
- Time zone: UTC+6

Döng-Aryk (also Don-Aryk or Den-Aryk) is a village in the Chüy District of Chüy Region of Kyrgyzstan. The village was established in 1929. Its population was 3,486 in 2021.
