= Kemi Oba culture =

Kemi-Oba culture
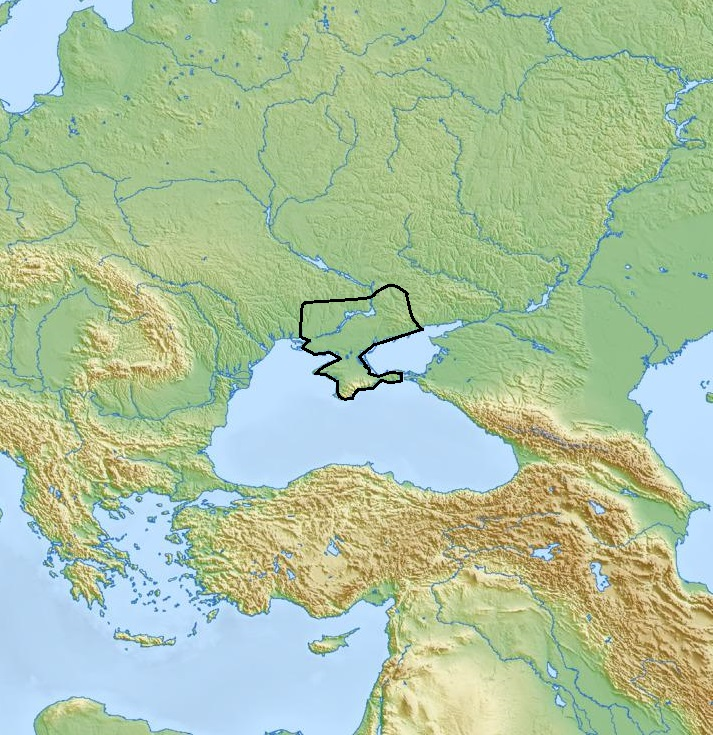
- Geographical range: Crimea
- Period: Early Bronze Age
- Dates: c. 3700–2200 BC

The Kemi Oba culture, c. 3700—2200 BC, an archaeological culture at the northwest face of the Sea of Azov, the lower Bug and Dnieper Rivers and the Crimea. The Kemi Oba culture is contemporaneous and partly overlapping with the Catacomb culture.

== Origins ==
According to Mallory, this was a component of the larger Yamnaya horizon, while Anthony regards it to be a separate culture, which was replaced by a late Yamnaya variant after 2800 BCE.

== Characteristics ==
The economy was based on both stockbreeding and agriculture. It had its own distinctive pottery, which is suggested to be more refined than that of its neighbors.

The inhumation practice was to lay the remains on its side, with the knees flexed, in pits, stone lined cists or timber-framed graves topped with a kurgan. Of particular interest are carved stone stelae or menhirs that also show up in secondary use in Yamnaya culture burials.

Metal objects were imported from the Maykop culture. Strong links have been suggested with the adjacent/overlapping Lower Mikhaylovka group.

== Sources ==
- Anthony, David W. (2007), The Horse, the Wheel, and Language: How Bronze-Age Riders from the Eurasian Steppes Shaped the Modern World, Princeton University Press, ISBN 978-0-691-14818-2
- Mallory, J.P. (1997). "Kemi Oba Culture". In Mallory, J.P.; Adams, Douglas Q. (eds.). Encyclopedia of Indo-European Culture. London: Fitzroy Dearborn Publishers. ISBN 978-1-884964-98-5.
