= Arco stelae =

Copper Age stele

The Arco Stelae consist of six Copper Age statue menhirs which were discovered in the vicinity of Arco, Trentino, in 1989. They are similar in style to other anthropomorphic stelae made across Europe between the 4th and 3rd millennium BC.

== Arco I ==
Arco I

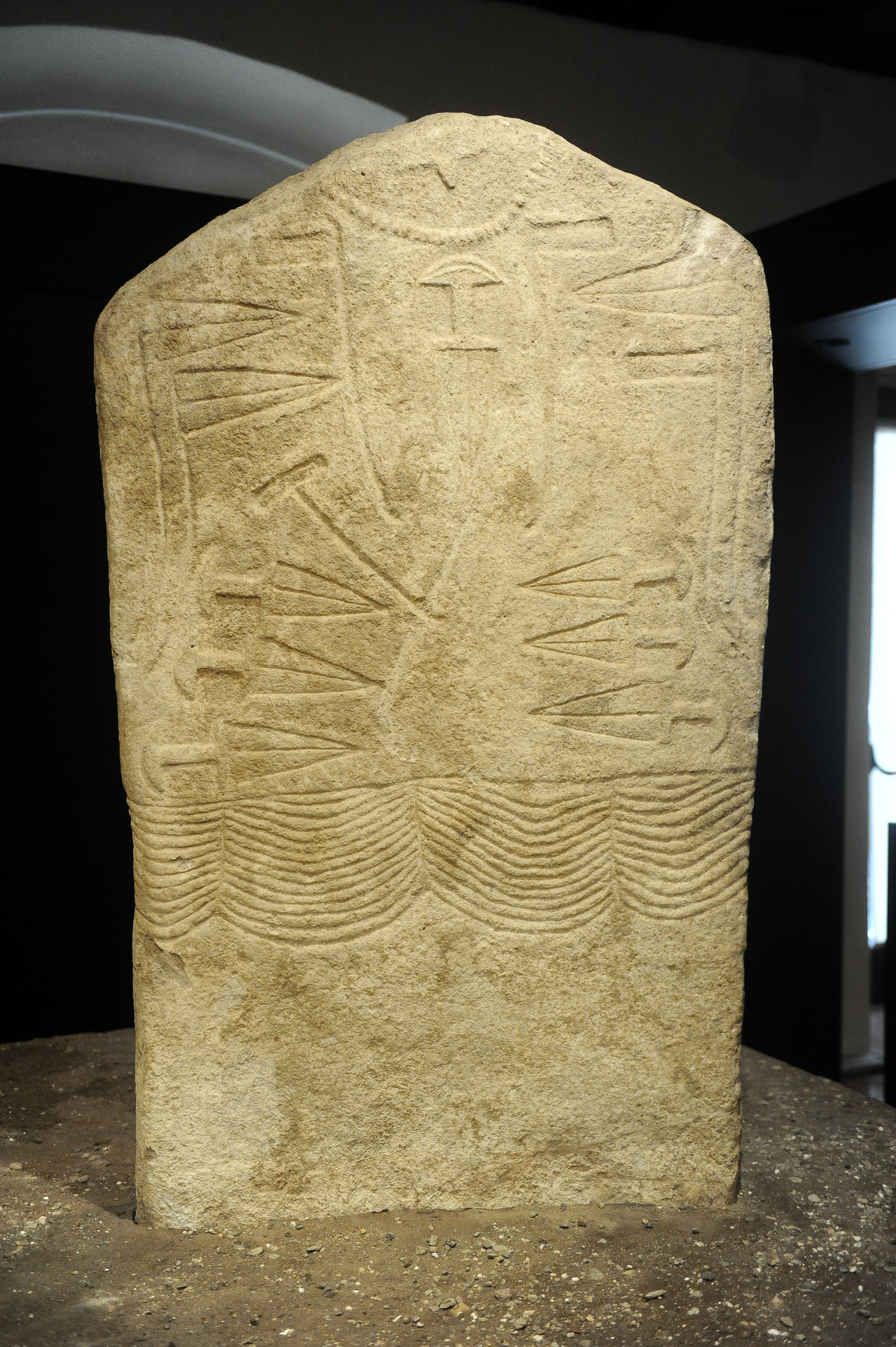
Front

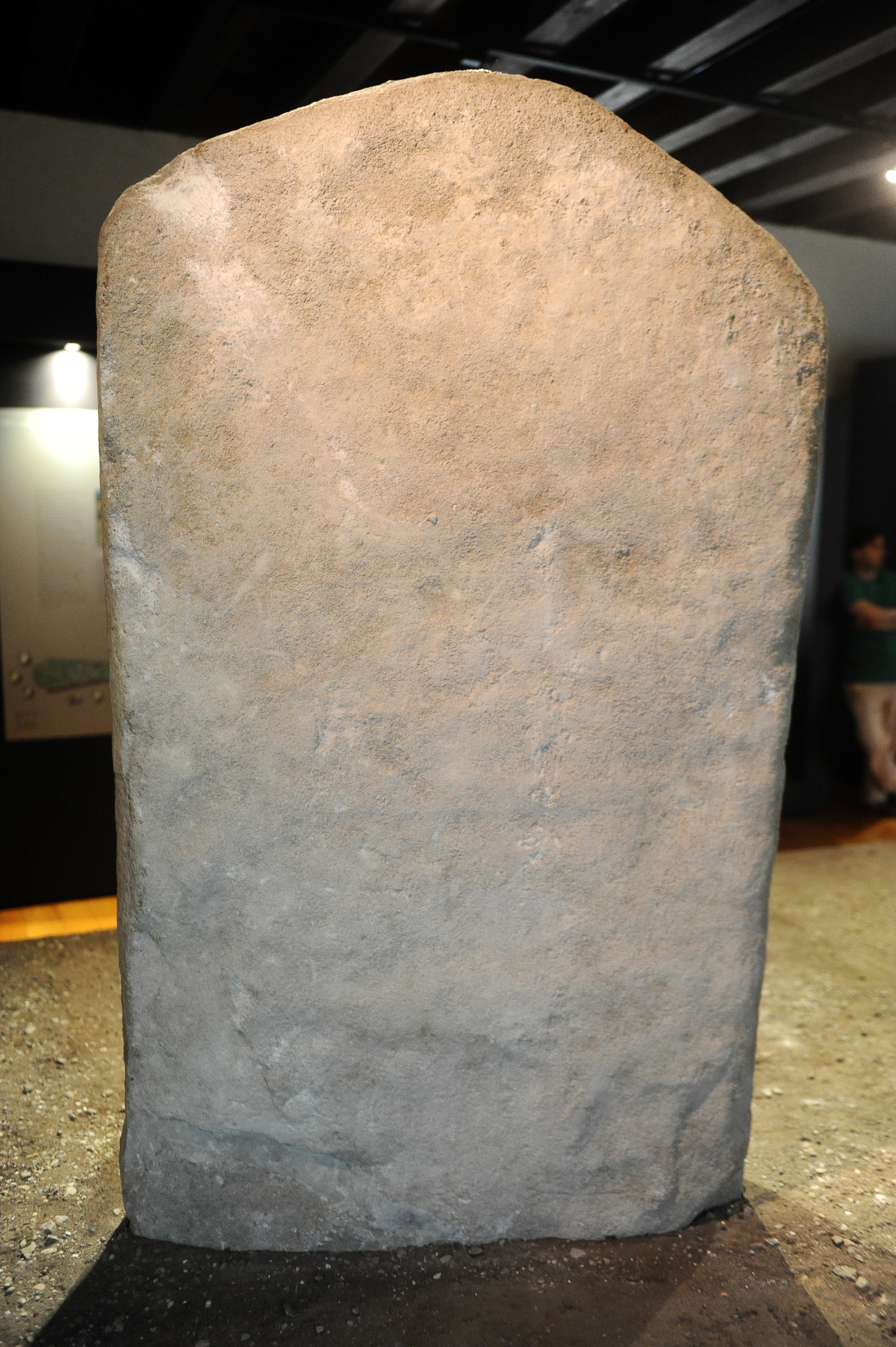
Back

Arco I, discovered in 1989, is 2.15 meter high limestone stela. It depicts a heavily armed, apparently male figure with seven daggers, three axes, three halberds, and an ornamental necklace.
