= Kegeti =

Kegeti Кегети Кегеты
- Location within Kyrgyzstan
- Coordinates: 42°41′24″N 75°10′12″E
- Country: Kyrgyzstan
- Region: Chüy Region
- District: Chüy District
- Elevation: 1,233 m (4,045 ft)

Population (2021)
  - Total: 3,004

Kegeti (Kyrgyz: Кегети Russian: Кегеты) is a village in the Chüy Region of Kyrgyzstan. It is part of the Chüy District. Its population was 3,004 in 2021.
