= Chüy District =

Coordinates: 42°50′N 75°17′E

Chüy Чүй району
- District
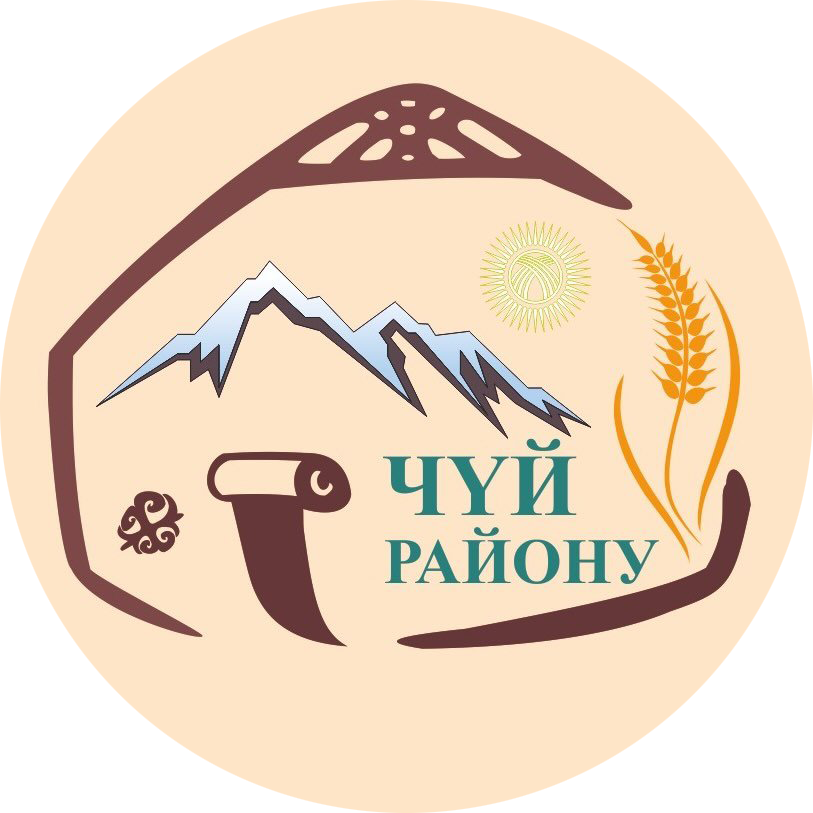
- Coat of arms

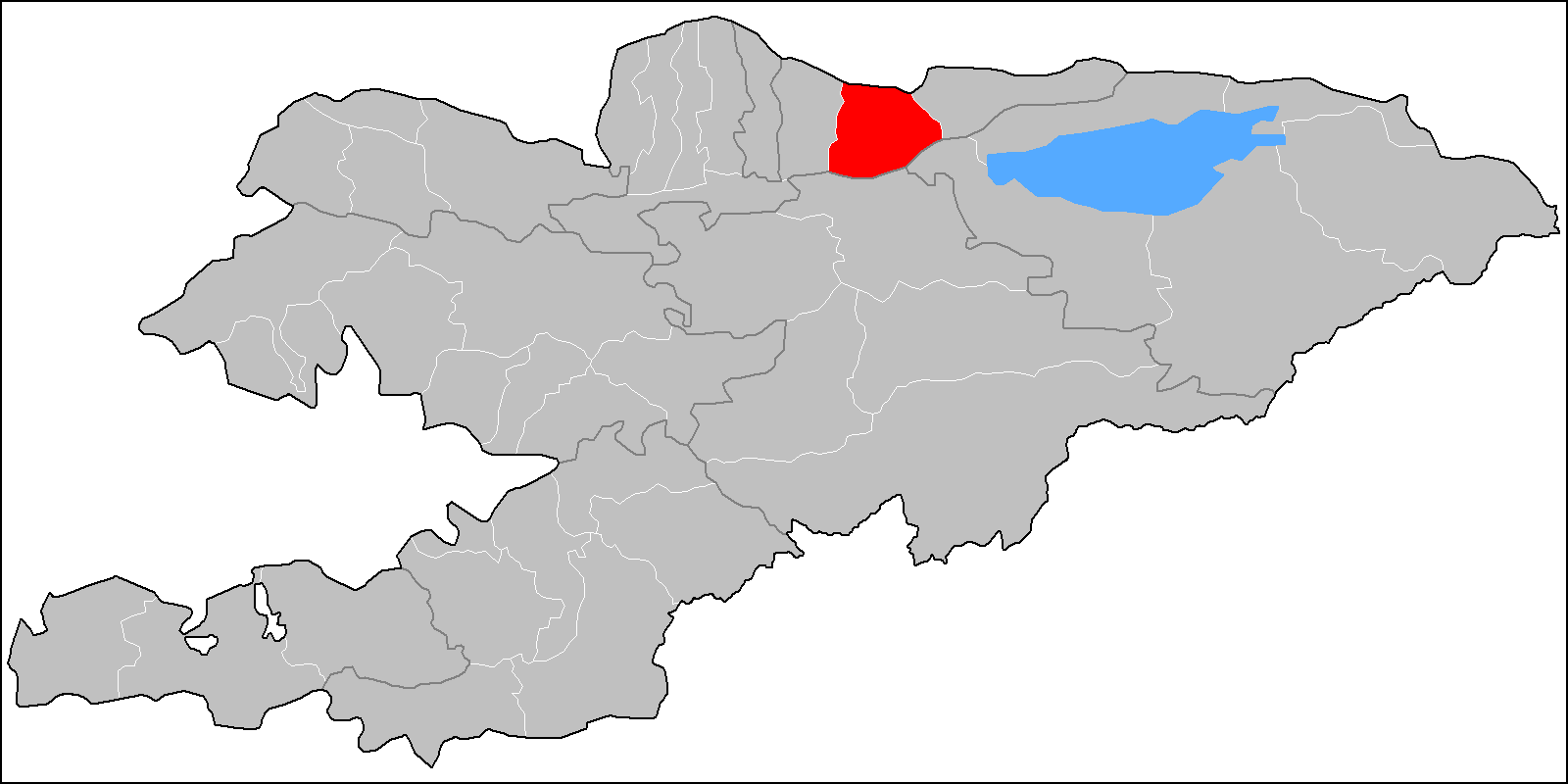
- Country: Kyrgyzstan
- Region: Chüy Region
- Established: 1927
- Seat: Tokmok

Area
  - Total: 1,756 km^{2} (678 sq mi)

Population (2021)
  - Total: 54,622
  - Density: 31.11/km^{2} (80.56/sq mi)
- Time zone: UTC+6

Chüy (Kyrgyz: Чүй району, romanized: Chüy rayonu) is a district of Chüy Region in northern Kyrgyzstan. Its area is 1,756 square kilometres (678 sq mi), and its resident population was 54,622 in 2021. The district surrounds the city of Tokmok, but does not include it. The administrative seat lies at Tokmok.

== Geography ==
Chüy District is located in the eastern part of Chüy Valley. Its southern part spreads into Kyrgyz Ala-Too mountains. The river Chu (Chüy) and its tributaries Shamshy, Kegeti, etc. dominate the hydrology. There are a number of glaciers feeding tributaries in Kyrgyz Ala-Too such as Shamshy Glacier, Kel-Ter, etc. The climate is continental.

== Demographics ==
As of 2009, Chüy District included 38 villages. Its population, according to the Population and Housing Census of 2009, was 47,017.

Historical populations in Chüy District
Year	Pop.	±%
1970	33,079	—
1979	37,668	+13.9%
1989	42,881	+13.8%
1999	45,071	+5.1%
2009	47,017	+4.3%
2021	54,622	+16.2%
Note: resident population; Sources:

=== Ethnic composition ===
According to the 2009 Census, the ethnic composition (de jure population) of the Chüy District was:

Ethnic group	Population	Proportion of Chüy District population
Kyrgyzs	39,116	83.2%
Russians	3,255	6.9%
Dungans	2,201	4.7%
Azerbaijanis	828	1.8%
Kazakhs	522	1.1%
Uzbeks	294	0.6%
Germans	152	0.3%
Tatars	130	0.3%
other groups	519	1.1%

== Rural communities and villages ==
In total, Chüy District include 38 settlements in 10 rural communities (ayyl aymagy). Each rural community can consist of one or several villages. The rural communities and settlements in the Chüy District are:

1. Ak-Beshim (seat: Ak-Beshim; incl. Jangy-Jol and Kalygul)
2. Burana (seat: Döng-Aryk; incl. Alga, Burana and Meenetkech)
3. Chüy (seat: Chüy; incl. Aral and Sadovy)
4. Ibraimov (seat: Koshoy; incl. Kara-Oy, Kyzyl-Asker, Lenin, Lenin-Jol and Taldy-Bulak)
5. Iskra (seat: Kara-Döbö; incl. Vostochny, Jangy-Turmush, Zheleznodorozhnoye and Iskra)
6. Kegeti (seat: Kegeti; incl. Arpa-Tektir, Akmatbek, Sovet and Chapaev)
7. Kosh-Korgon (seat: Kosh-Korgon)
8. On Bir-Jylga (seat: Progress; incl. Kayyrma, Madaniyat and Onbir-Jylga)
9. Saylyk (seat: Saylyk; incl. Vinogradnoye and Jangy-Chek)
10. Shamshy (seat: Shamshy; incl. Chong-Jar, Kosh-Kashat and Karagul)
Settlements of the Chüy District

== Famous people born in Chüy District ==
- Ashyraaly Botaliev, born in 1906, opera and drama artist
- Djamankul Djenchuraev, born in 1907, Kyrgyz and Soviet writer, border guard
- Asankan Djumakmatov, born in 1923, orchestral conductor
- Sultan Ibraimov, born in 1927, politician
- Kalmyrza Sarpek uulu, born in 1866, akyn

== See also ==
- Krasnyy Most
