= Kara-Döbö, Chüy =

Kara-Döbö Кара-Дөбө
- Location within Kyrgyzstan
- Coordinates: 42°47′06″N 75°26′40″E
- Country: Kyrgyzstan
- Region: Chüy Region
- District: Chüy District

Area
  - Total: 0.6 km^{2} (0.23 sq mi)
- Elevation: 948 m (3,110 ft)

Population (2021)
  - Total: 1,495

Kara-Döbö or Karadebe is a village in the Chüy District of Chüy Region of Kyrgyzstan. Its population was 1,495 in 2021.
