= Kyzyl-Asker =

Kyzyl-Asker Кызыл-Аскер
- Location within Kyrgyzstan
- Coordinates: 42°44′30″N 75°19′50″E
- Country: Kyrgyzstan
- Region: Chüy Region
- District: Chüy District

Population (2021)
  - Total: 536

Kyzyl-Asker (Kyrgyz: Кызыл-Аскер; "Red Army") is a village in the Chüy Region of Kyrgyzstan. Its population was 536 in 2021.
