= Shamshy, Chüy =

Shamshy Шамшы
- Location within Kyrgyzstan
- Coordinates: 42°42′0″N 75°21′50″E
- Country: Kyrgyzstan
- Region: Chüy Region
- District: Chüy District
- Elevation: 1,219 m (3,999 ft)

Population (2021)
  - Total: 1,010

Shamshy is a village in the Chüy Region of Kyrgyzstan. Its population was 1,010 in 2021.
