= Great Chüy Canal =

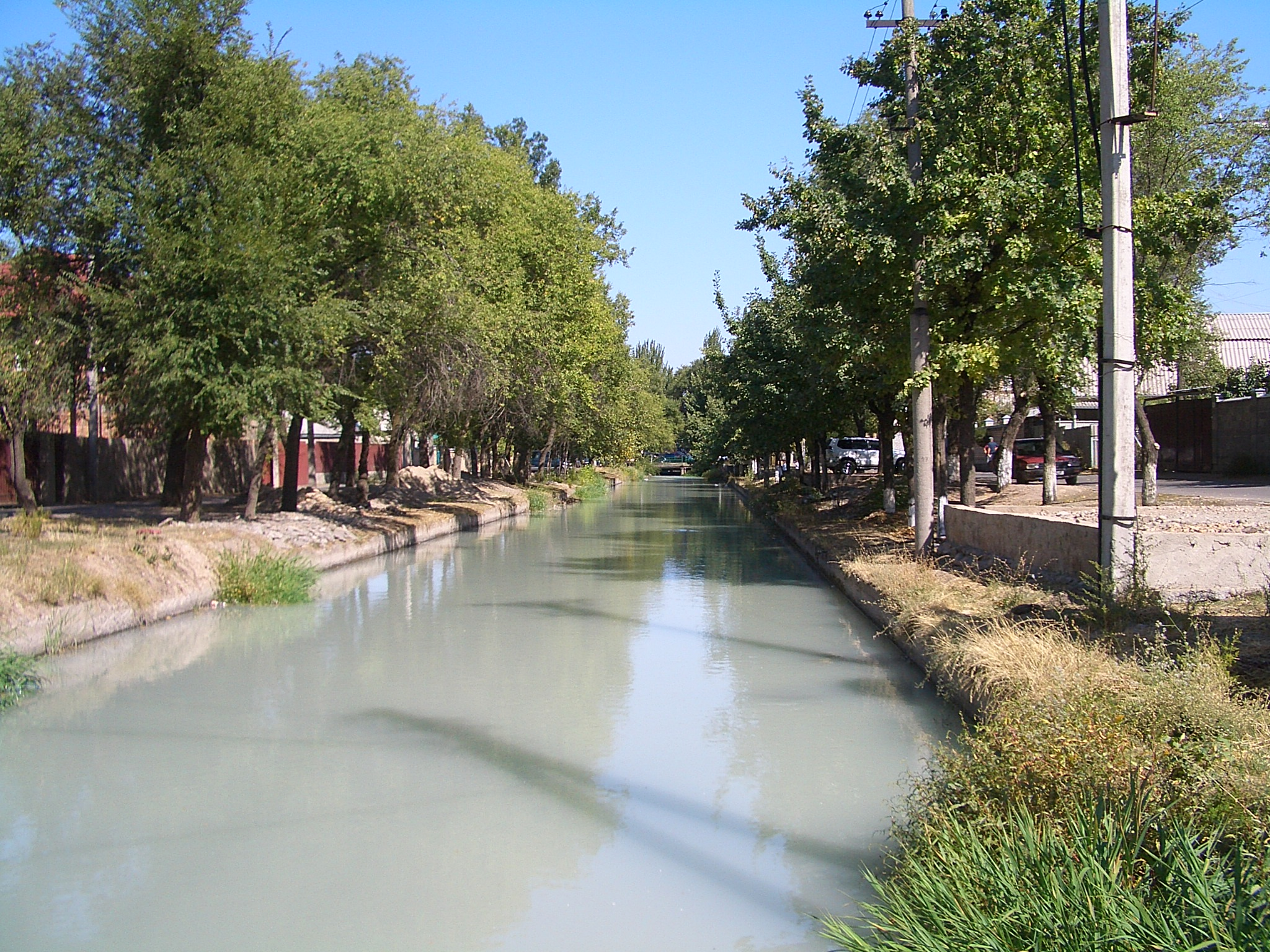
- The canal as it runs through Bishkek
- Interactive map of Great Chüy Canal

Specifications
- Status: open

History
- Original owner: Soviet Union
- Principal engineer: M. V. Patrushev
- Construction began: 1941-06
- Date of first use: 1958

Geography
- Start point: Chüy near Gidrostroitel
- End point: near Merki
- Beginning coordinates: 42°50′40″N 75°09′38″E
- Ending coordinates: 42°56′41″N 73°01′54″E

The Great Chüy Canal (Kyrgyz: Чоң Чүй каналы, [tʃɔɴ tʃyj kʰɑnɑɫɯ]; Russian: Большой Чуйский канал, often abbreviated БЧК) is one of an extensive complex of irrigation canals of the Chüy Valley in Kyrgyzstan and to some extent Kazakhstan, composed of three branches: the Western Great Chüy Canal, the Eastern Great Chüy Canal, and the Southern Great Chüy Canal. The Great Chüy Canal flows through the northern part of Bishkek, the capital of Kyrgyzstan, from east to west. It was built under the administration of the Soviet Union, with M. V. Patrushev as authoring engineer.

Thirty-three thousand individuals took part in building the canal, mainly using pickaxes and shovels (as opposed to heavy machinery), and it remains in collective consciousness in Kyrgyzstan as a major building project of the 20th century. A record was set in on June 16, 1941, as kolkhoz workers dug 90 cubic meters of dirt by hand.

== Western Great Chüy Canal ==
The Western Great Chüy Canal is the longest irrigation canal in Kyrgyzstan. It begins from the river Chüy naer the village Gidrostroitel, about 8 km east of Ivanovka. It flows from east to west across the entire Chüy Valley, passing along the cities Kant, Bishkek, Shopokov, Belovodskoye and Kara-Balta before entering Kazakhstan, where it ends near Merki. The entire length of the canal is 145 km, and it irrigates an area of 82 thousand hectares. The regular rate of water flow at the head of the canal is 43 cubic meters per second, and it can support an excess capacity of 55 meters per second. Construction of the canal began in 1940.

== Eastern Great Chüy Canal ==
The Eastern Great Chüy Canal was built in 1958. The canal flows along the Chüy Valley from east to west parallel to and south of the Western Great Chüy Canal. It starts from the upper river Chüy near the village of Chym-Korgon, about 40 km upriver of the headworks of the Western Great Chüy Canal. It flows south of Tokmok and Ivanovka, and discharges into the Ala-Archa in Bishkek. The headgates are rated for a water throughput of 350 cubic meters per second. Its entire length is 100 km, and irrigates an area of 41.5 thousand hectares.

== Southern Great Chüy Canal ==
Construction on the Southern Great Chüy Canal began in 1976. It begins from the river Ysyk-Ata (at the village of Yuryevka) and runs along the southern edge of Bishkek, intersecting the river Alamüdün, and ending in the Ala-Archa in Orto-Say, south of Bishkek. Its entire length stretches 158 km, and it is designed to irrigate 3000 hectares of land. Waterflow at the headgates is 90 cubic meters per second. Construction on the canal continues around Valeriy Kritsanov Village.
