= Telman, Ysyk-Ata =

Telman Тельман
- Village
- Location within Kyrgyzstan
- Coordinates: 42°43′29″N 75°04′02″E
- Country: Kyrgyzstan
- Region: Chüy Region
- District: Ysyk-Ata District
- Rural Community: Syn-Tash
- Elevation: 1,085 m (3,560 ft)

Population (2021)
  - Total: 1,198
- Time zone: UTC+6 (KGT)

Telman (Kyrgyz: Тельман) is a village in the Ysyk-Ata District of Chüy Region of Kyrgyzstan. Its population was 1,198 in 2021.

Telman is the administrative seat for the Syn-Tash rural community (ayyl aymagy), which includes the surrounding villages of Ak-Say, Jetigen, Kyzyl-Aryk, Ötögön, Rot-Front, Sovet and Syn-Tash.
