= Kara-Balta (river) =

- Native name: Карабалта (Kyrgyz)

Location
- Countries: Kyrgyzstan; Kazakhstan

Physical characteristics
- Mouth: Ak-Suu
  - coordinates: 43.2662°N 73.9961°E
- Length: 133 km (83 mi)
- Basin size: 577 km^{2} (223 sq mi)
- Discharge
  - average: 5.25 m^{3}/s (185 cu ft/s)

Basin features
- Progression: Ak-Suu→ Chu→ Betpak-Dala desert

The Kara-Balta (Kyrgyz: Карабалта, Russian: Кара-Балта) is a transboundary river in Jayyl District of Chüy Region in northern Kyrgyzstan and in Shu District of Jambyl Region in southern Kazakhstan. It rises on north slopes of Kyrgyz Ala-Too, passes through the Sosnovka Gorge, flowing through the Chüy Valley from south to north. The river discharge in Ak-Suu, itself a tributary of the Chu, in Kazakhstan. The Kara-Balta river is 133 kilometres (83 mi) long, and has a drainage basin of 577 square kilometres (223 sq mi). Its average annual discharge is 5.25 m^{3}/s (185 cu ft/s). The catchment area contains small glaciers covering an area of 8 square kilometres (3.1 sq mi) and small lakes with an area of 2.22 square kilometres (0.86 sq mi). It flows through the settlements Sosnovka, Kara-Balta and Stavropolovka.
