= Ak-Suu =

Ak-Suu may refer to the following places in Kyrgyzstan:

Populated places

- Ak-Suu, Chüy, a village in Moskva District, Chüy Region
- Ak-Suu, a rural community (ayyl aymagy) in Moskva District, Chüy Region, centered on the village Tömön-Suu
- Ak-Suu, Leylek, a village in Leylek District, Batken Region
- Ak-Suu District, a district in Issyk-Kul Region
- An alternative name of Teploklyuchenka, a village in Issyk-Kul Region
- Ak-Suu, Jalal-Abad, a village in Aksy District, Jalal-Abad Region

Rivers

- Aksu River (Xinjiang), a river originating in southeastern Issyk-Kul Region, flowing into the river Tarim
- Ak-Suu (Jyrgalang), a river in eastern Issyk-Kul Region, flowing into the Jyrgalang
- Ak-Suu (Chu), a river in Chüy Region, flowing into the Chu (Chüy)
- Ak-Suu (Syr Darya), a river in Batken Region, flowing into the Syr Darya
