= 2007–08 VfL Wolfsburg season =

VfL Wolfsburg
2007–08 season
- Manager: Felix Magath
- Bundesliga: 5th
- DFB-Pokal: Semi-finals
- Top goalscorer: League: Grafite (11); All: Grafite (12)
Home colours	Away colours	Third colours

VfL Wolfsburg had their best season yet in the Bundesliga under new coach Felix Magath. The double Bundesliga-winning coach from Bayern Munich improved the fortunes of Wolfsburg from a relegation-threatened side to a fifth place-finish. This was just the start of a sensational ascent to the top of German football, culminating in a shock title win the season afterwards. New signings Diego Benaglio, Josué, Grafite and Edin Džeko were all successful and played a big part in the resurgence.

== Players ==
=== First-team squad ===
Squad at end of season

Note: Flags indicate national team as defined under FIFA eligibility rules; some limited exceptions apply. Players may hold more than one non-FIFA nationality.

No.	Pos.	Nation	Player
1	GK	GER	Simon Jentzsch
2	DF	ARG	Facundo Quiroga
3	DF	BEL	Peter Van der Heyden
4	DF	GER	Marcel Schäfer
5	DF	POR	Ricardo Costa
6	DF	CZE	Jan Šimůnek
7	MF	BRA	Josué (captain)
8	MF	GER	Daniel Baier
9	FW	BIH	Edin Džeko
10	MF	POL	Jacek Krzynówek
11	MF	GER	Alexander Laas
12	GK	GER	André Lenz
13	MF	JPN	Makoto Hasebe
14	MF	PAR	Jonathan Santana (Note: Santana was born in Buenos Aires, Argentina, but also qualified to represent Paraguay internationally through his mother and made his international debut for Paraguay in 2007.)
16	GK	SUI	Diego Benaglio
17	DF	GER	Alexander Madlung
18	MF	COD	Cédric Makiadi
20	DF	GER	Sascha Riether

No.	Pos.	Nation	Player
22	MF	POR	Alex
23	FW	BRA	Grafite
24	MF	GER	Ashkan Dejagah (Note: Dejagah was born in Tehran, Iran, but was raised in Germany from the age of 1 and represented Germany at every youth level between U-17 and U-21 level. He was permitted to represent Iran internationally after a FIFA rule change in 2009 and made his international debut for Iran in February 2012.)
25	MF	GER	Christian Gentner (on loan from Stuttgart)
26	MF	GER	Sergej Evljuskin (Note: Evljuskin was born in Alekseyevka, Kirghizia, Soviet Union (now Kyrgyzstan) but was raised in Germany from the age of 2 and represented Germany at every youth level between U-16 and U-20 level before being called up by Kyrgyzstan in 2015.)
27	MF	GUI	Pablo Thiam
28	FW	USA	Kamani Hill
30	MF	KOS	Valdet Rama (Note: Rama was born in Mitrovica, Yugoslavia (now Kosovo), but also qualified to represent Albania internationally and made his international debut for Albania in March 2013. He would later declare internationally for Kosovo but has not represented them as of 2020.)
31	MF	GER	Emre Öztürk
32	MF	BRA	Marcelinho Paraíba
33	DF	GER	Daniel Reiche
34	GK	GER	Jonas Deumeland
36	FW	SEN	Mame Niang
37	DF	KAZ	Sergei Karimov
38	MF	GER	Philipp Kreuels
40	FW	SRB	Danijel Ljuboja (Note: Ljuboja was born in Vinkovci, Yugoslavia (now Croatia), but also qualified to represent Serbia internationally through his parents and made his international debut for Serbia in 2003.) (on loan from Stuttgart)
41	GK	GER	Marvin Karow

=== Left club during season ===
Note: Flags indicate national team as defined under FIFA eligibility rules; some limited exceptions apply. Players may hold more than one non-FIFA nationality.

No.	Pos.	Nation	Player
7	FW	ARG	Juan Carlos Menseguez (to San Lorenzo)
13	FW	GHA	Isaac Boakye (on loan to Mainz)
15	DF	GER	Christopher Lamprecht (on loan to Kaiserslautern)
16	DF	GER	Uwe Möhrle (to Augsburg)

No.	Pos.	Nation	Player
19	MF	ROU	Vlad Munteanu (on loan to Auxerre)
21	GK	GER	Patrick Platins (on loan to Augsburg)
29	FW	ROU	Sergiu Radu (on loan to Stuttgart)

== Results ==
=== Bundesliga ===
1	VfL Wolfsburg	1–3	Arminia Bielefeld
	Radu 84'		Wichniarek 38'; Eigler 52'; Kirch 80'

2	MSV Duisburg	1–3	VfL Wolfsburg
	Lavrič 88'		Marcelinho 41'; Madlung 51'; Radu 72'

3	VfL Wolfsburg	1–1	Schalke 04
	Krzynówek 36'		Halil Altıntop 86'

4	Hertha BSC	2–1	VfL Wolfsburg
	Pantelić 38'; Okoronkwo 88'		Dejagah 61'

5	VfL Wolfsburg	1–2	Karlsruher SC
	Krzynówek 22'		Eggimann 63'; Eichner 79'

6	Energie Cottbus	1–2	VfL Wolfsburg
	Sørensen 33'		Džeko 22'; Krzynówek 83'

7	VfL Wolfsburg	1–1	Werder Bremen
	Josué 66'		Diego 48'

8	Hamburger SV	2–2	VfL Wolfsburg
	Reinhardt 17'; Van der Vaart 70'		Grafite 57' (pen.); Dejagah 88'

9	VfL Wolfsburg	1–0	Hansa Rostock
	Džeko 89'

10	Hannover 96	2–2	VfL Wolfsburg
	Pinto 28'; Tarnat 35'		Marcelinho 21'; Dejagah 29'

11	VfL Wolfsburg	3–1	1. FC Nürnberg
	Charisteas 30' (o.g.); Grafite 35'; Dejagah 69'		Misimović 54'

12	VfL Bochum	5–3	VfL Wolfsburg
	Šesták 4', 44'; Maltritz 19'; Fuchs 42'; Epalle 63'		Schäfer 49'; Grafite 56', 73'

13	VfL Wolfsburg	1–2	Bayer Leverkusen
	M. Friedrich 70' (o.g.)		Barnetta 37'; Kießling 52'

14	Bayern Munich	2–1	VfL Wolfsburg
	Klose 34'; Ribéry 50'		Dejagah 71'

15	VfL Wolfsburg	2–2	Eintracht Frankfurt
	Gentner 7'; Džeko 49'		Maicon 35'; Fink 50'

16	VfB Stuttgart	3–1	VfL Wolfsburg
	Marica 26'; Cacau 48'; Hitzlsperger 86'		Džeko 51'

17	VfL Wolfsburg	4–0	Borussia Dortmund
	Schäfer 8'; Costa 11'; Gentner 60'; Džeko 78'

18	Arminia Bielefeld	0–1	VfL Wolfsburg
			Grafite 26'

19	VfL Wolfsburg	2–1	MSV Duisburg
	Schäfer 35'; Grafite 54'		Niculescu 26'

20	Schalke 04	1–2	VfL Wolfsburg
	Sánchez 65'		Grafite 73', 84' (pen.)

21	VfL Wolfsburg	0–0	Hertha BSC

22	Karlsruher SC	3–1	VfL Wolfsburg
	Eggimann 22'; Kennedy 73'; Iashvili 90'		Schäfer 28'

23	VfL Wolfsburg	3–0	Energie Cottbus
	Gentner 17'; Marcelinho 19', 76'

24	Werder Bremen	0–1	VfL Wolfsburg
			Grafite 50'

25	VfL Wolfsburg	1–1	Hamburger SV
	Ljuboja 52'		Reinhardt 14'

26	Hansa Rostock	0–1	VfL Wolfsburg
			Krzynówek 90'

27	VfL Wolfsburg	3–2	Hannover 96
	Ashkan Dejagah 20', 71'; Marcelinho 29'		Bruggink 27'; Štajner 79'

28	1. FC Nürnberg	1–0	VfL Wolfsburg
	Koller 78'

29	VfL Wolfsburg	0–1	VfL Bochum
			Šesták 88'

30	Bayer Leverkusen	2–2	VfL Wolfsburg
	Gekas 33'; Costa 73' (o.g.)		Džeko 13'; Hasebe 43'

31	VfL Wolfsburg	0–0	Bayern Munich

32	Eintracht Frankfurt	2–3	VfL Wolfsburg
	Amanatidis 22' (pen.); Weissenberger 63'		Grafite 4'; Schäfer 29'; Džeko 79'

33	VfL Wolfsburg	4–0	VfB Stuttgart
	Marcelinho 16'; Džeko 22', 76'; Costa 55'

34	Borussia Dortmund	2–4	VfL Wolfsburg
	Frei 25', 69'		Riether 3'; Marcelinho 6'; Schäfer 62'; Grafite 76'

=== Top Scorers ===
- (Brazil) Grafite 11 (2)
- (Bosnia and Herzegovina) Edin Džeko 8
- (Germany) Ashkan Dejagah 8
- (Brazil) Marcelinho 6
- (Poland) Jacek Krzynówek 4
- (Germany) Marcel Schäfer 4

== Sources ==
BetExploer - German Bundesliga 2007/2008
