= Sretensky =

Sretensky (masculine), Sretenskaya (feminine), or Sretenskoye (neuter) may refer to:

- Sretensky District, a district of Zabaykalsky Krai, Russia
- Sretenskoye Urban Settlement, a municipal formation which the town of Sretensk and one rural locality in Sretensky District of Zabaykalsky Krai, Russia are incorporated as
- Sretensky, Russia (Sretenskaya, Sretenskoye), several rural localities in Russia
- Sretenskoye, Kyrgyzstan, a village in Kyrgyzstan
