= Ötögön =

Ötögön Өтөгөн
- Location within Kyrgyzstan
- Coordinates: 42°42′10″N 75°8′50″E
- Country: Kyrgyzstan
- Region: Chüy
- District: Ysyk-Ata
- Elevation: 1,144 m (3,753 ft)

Population (2021)
  - Total: 982

Ötögön (Kyrgyz: Өтөгөн, formerly: Birikken) is a village in the Chüy Region of Kyrgyzstan. It is part of the Ysyk-Ata District. Its population was 982 in 2021. It lies at an elevation of 1,144 m (3,753 ft). Nearby villages include Döng-Aryk, Kegeti, Stambek, Syn-Tash, and Yuryevka.
