= Ak-Say =

Ak-Say may refer to the following places in Kyrgyzstan:

- Ak-Say, Chüy, a village in the Chüy Region
- Ak-Say, Issyk-Kul, a village in the Issyk-Kul Region
