= Ak-Suu Integrated Reserve =

Protected area in Kyrgyzstan

- IUCN category IV (habitat/species management area)
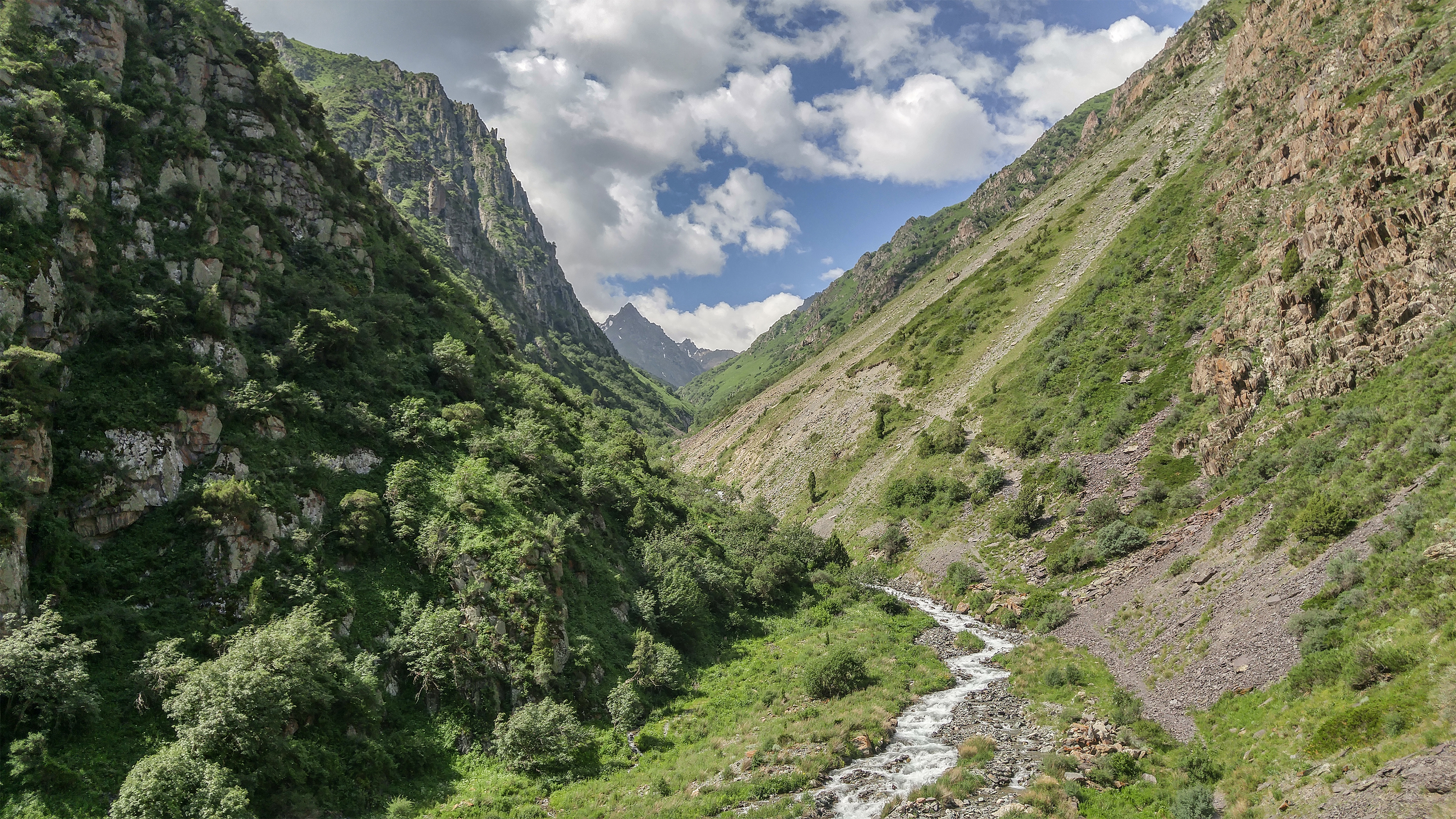

- Location within Kyrgyzstan
- Location: Moskva District, Chüy Region, Kyrgyzstan
- Coordinates: 42°25′32″N 74°3′36″E
- Area: 7,600 ha (19,000 acres)
- Established: 1971

Ak-Suu Integrated Reserve (Kyrgyz: Ак-Суу комплекстүү заказниги) is a nature and game reserve located in the Ak-Suu rural community, Moskva District, Chüy Region, Kyrgyzstan. Established in 1971, it covers 7600 hectares.
