= Karagay-Bulak =

- Location within Kyrgyzstan
- Coordinates: 42°38′40″N 74°57′00″E
- Country: Kyrgyzstan
- Region: Chüy Region
- District: Ysyk-Ata District
- Elevation: 1,560 m (5,120 ft)

Population (2021)
  - Total: 857

Karagay-Bulak is a village in the Ysyk-Ata District of Chüy Region of Kyrgyzstan. Its population was 857 in 2021.
