= Keng-Bulung =

Keng-Bulung Кең-Булуң
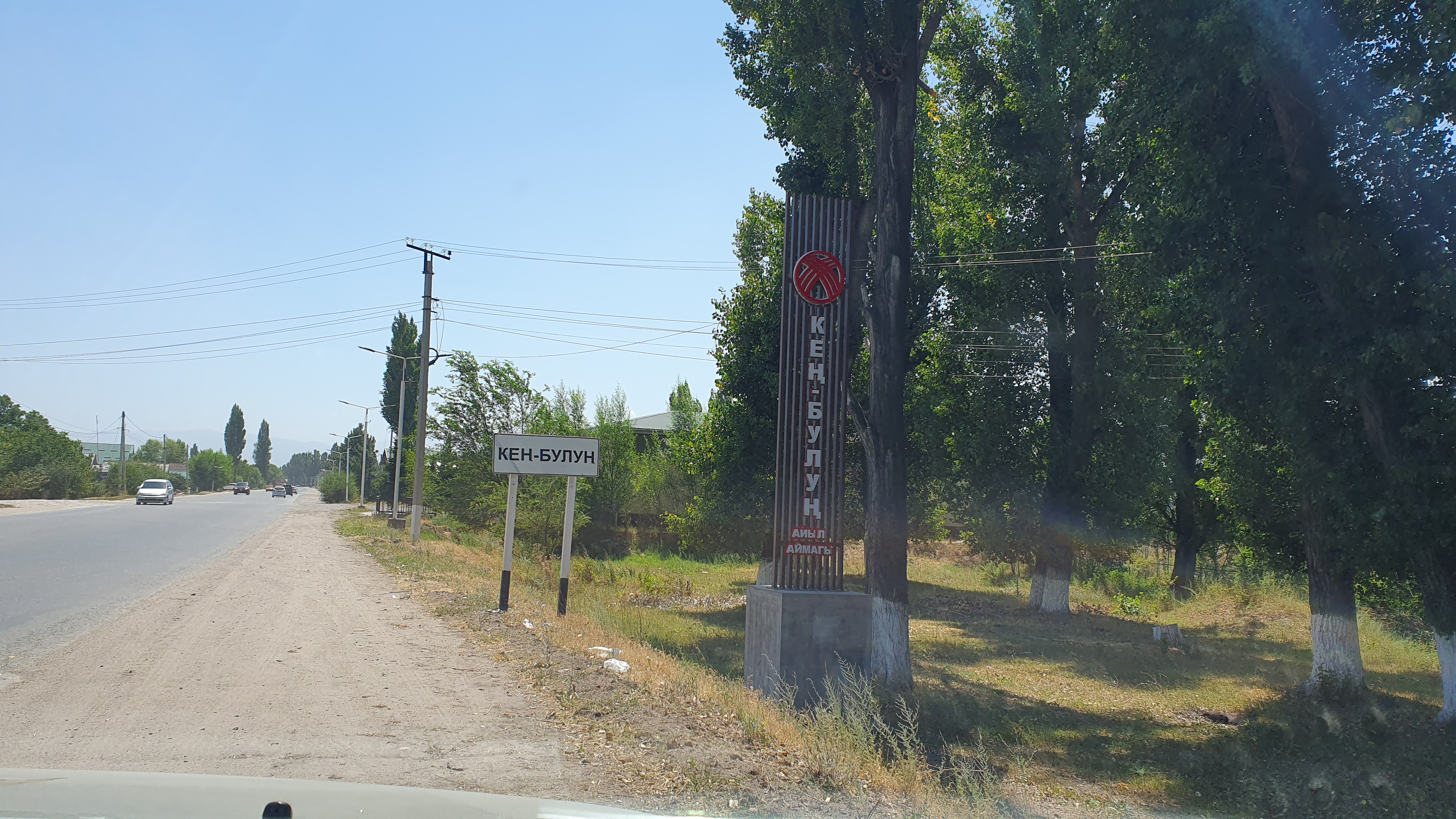

- Location within Kyrgyzstan
- Coordinates: 42°52′20″N 75°7′40″E
- Country: Kyrgyzstan
- Region: Chüy
- District: Ysyk-Ata
- Elevation: 750 m (2,460 ft)

Population (2021)
  - Total: 3,741

Keng-Bulung (Kyrgyz: Кең-Булуң) is a village in the Ysyk-Ata District of Chüy Region of Kyrgyzstan. Its population was 3,741 in 2021. It was established in 1921.
