= Ak-Kuduk, Chüy =

Ak-Kuduk Ак-Кудук (Kyrgyz)
- Location within Kyrgyzstan
- Coordinates: 42°58′12″N 74°52′20″E
- Country: Kyrgyzstan
- Region: Chüy Region
- District: Ysyk-Ata District
- Elevation: 667 m (2,188 ft)

Population (2021)
  - Total: 861

Ak-Kuduk (Kyrgyz: Ак-Кудук) is a village in the Ysyk-Ata District of Chüy Region of Kyrgyzstan. Its population was 861 in 2021.
