= Kalinin, Chuy =

Village in Jayyl District of Kyrgyzstan

Kalinin Калинин
- Village
- Location within Kyrgyzstan
- Coordinates: 42°49′44″N 73°51′05″E
- Country: Kyrgyzstan
- Region: Chüy
- District: Jayyl
- Rural district: Krasnovostochny
- Elevation: 746 m (2,448 ft)

Population (2021)
  - Total: 3,764
- Time zone: UTC+6 (KGT)

Kalinin (Kyrgyz: Калинин) is a village and administrative center of Krasnovostochny Rural District, Jayyl District, Chüy Region, Kyrgyzstan. As of 2021, it has a total population of 3,764.

== Geography ==
Kalinin is situated in the central part of Jayyl District, about 1 kilometer north of the district seat Kara-Balta. It is connected to the Highway ЭМ-03.

== Demographics ==
Historical population
Year	Pop.	±% p.a.
2009	3,740	—
2014	3,844	+0.55%
2021	3,764	−0.30%
