= Telmana =

Telmana may refer to:

- Imeni Telmana, a village in the Chuy Region of Kyrgyzstan
- Telmana, Leningrad Oblast, a logging depot settlement in the Leningrad Oblast in Russia
