= Sergej Evljuskin =

Footballer (born 1988)

Personal information
- Date of birth: 4 January 1988 (age 38)
- Place of birth: Alexeyevka, Kirghiz SSR, USSR
- Height: 1.78 m (5 ft 10 in)
- Position: Central midfielder

Youth career
- 1995–2003: Braunschweiger SC
- 2003–2006: VfL Wolfsburg

Senior career*
Years	Team	Apps	(Gls)
2006–2010	VfL Wolfsburg II	83	(4)
2006–2010	VfL Wolfsburg	0	(0)
2010–2011	Hansa Rostock	18	(0)
2011–2013	SV Babelsberg	65	(2)
2013–2014	Goslarer SC	27	(4)
2014–2021	Hessen Kassel	171	(7)
2021–2024	FSV Schöningen		
2024–2025	Hessen Kassel II		

International career
2003–2004	Germany U16	11	(0)
2004–2005	Germany U17	11	(2)
2005–2006	Germany U18	8	(3)
2006–2007	Germany U19	10	(2)
2007–2008	Germany U20	2	(0)
- * Club domestic league appearances and goals

Sergej Evljuskin (Russian: Сергей Евлюшкин, romanized: Sergey Yevlyushkin; born 4 January 1988) is a professional footballer who plays as a central midfielder. He represented Germany internationally at various youth levels. He was called up to the Kyrgyzstan senior national team in 2015 but did not make an appearance.

== Early life ==
Evljuskin was born in the village of Alekseyevka, Jayyl District, formerly known as Kalinin District, in the Kirghiz Soviet Socialist Republic, to a Russian-Kyrgyzstani father and an ethnic German mother from Kazakhstan. He and his family immigrated to Germany in 1990.

== Club career ==
Evljuskin spent six-and-a-half years at Hessen Kassel, mostly in the fourth-tier Regionalliga Südwest. He left the club and retired from playing in January 2021. He returned to playing on amateur level at the six-tier Landesliga Braunschweig in the 2021–22 season. He continued playing for FSV Schöningen as it was promoted to the fifth-tier Oberliga Niedersachsen for the 2022–23 season.

== International career ==
Evljuskin was called up in May 2015 by Aleksandr Krestinin to represent Kyrgyzstan national team in the 2018 FIFA World Cup Qualifiers against Bangladesh and Australia.
