= Dmitriyevka, Chüy =

Dmitriyevka Дмитриевка
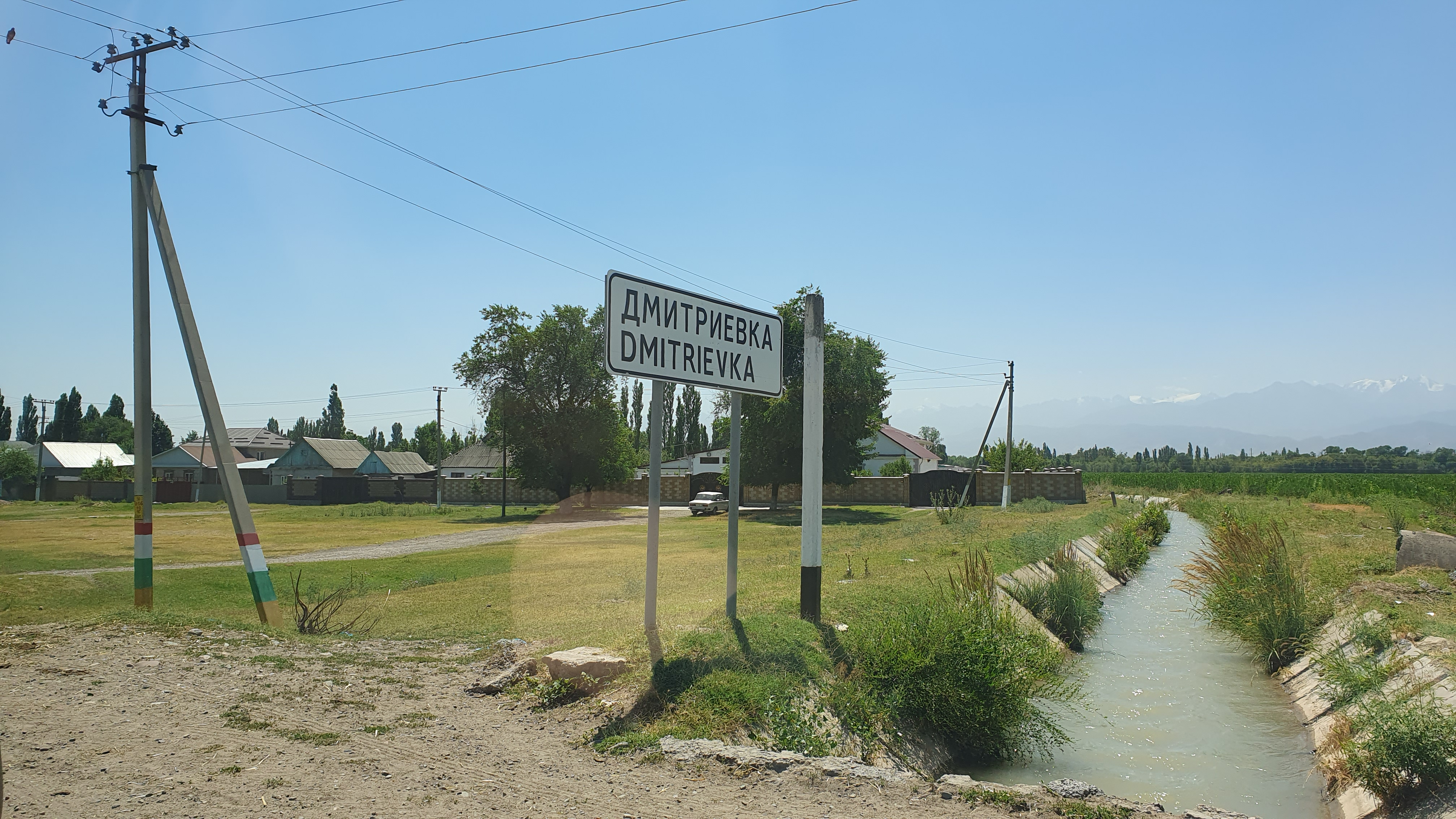

- Location within Kyrgyzstan
- Coordinates: 42°53′40″N 74°54′08″E
- Country: Kyrgyzstan
- Region: Chüy Region
- District: Ysyk-Ata District
- Elevation: 736 m (2,415 ft)

Population (2021)
  - Total: 3,602

Dmitriyevka is a village in the Ysyk-Ata District of Chüy Region of Kyrgyzstan. Its population was 3,602 in 2021.
