= Töö Ashuu =

Tөө Ashuu
- Kyrgyz: Төө-Ашуу, Russian: Тoo-Ашуу
- Location within Kyrgyzstan
- Elevation: 3,586 metres (11,765 ft)
- Traversed by: European route E010

Third Approach
- Location: Kyrgyzstan
- Range: Kyrgyz Ala-Too Range
- Coordinates: 42°20′37″N 73°48′24″E

Tөө Ashuu (Kyrgyz: Төө-Ашуу, romanised: Tөө-Ashuu, [tœː ɑʃuː]; Russian: Туя Ашуу), literally "camel mountain pass", is a mountain pass in Kyrgyzstan on the highway from Bishkek to Osh (European route E010) in Kyrgyzstan approximately 120 km from Bishkek. The pass goes over part of the Kyrgyz Alatau range of the Tien Shan mountains. Its elevation is 3,586 m (11,765 ft). In the 1960s a 2.8-kilometre-long (1.7 mi) road tunnel was built under the pass at 3,120 m (10,240 ft) elevation, bypassing the uppermost part of the pass road.

A ski resort is situated on the south slope of the Too Ashuu pass at 2960 m.a.s.l. The resort has one blue 1,500-metre-long (4,900 ft) ski slope operated by a chairlift with a height difference of 200 m. There is a possibility to ski a further 1500 m down to the highway. Shuttle marshrutkas then take the skiers back to the top section of the resort.

== Climate ==
Climate data for Töö Ashuu (1991–2020)
Month	Jan	Feb	Mar	Apr	May	Jun	Jul	Aug	Sep	Oct	Nov	Dec	Year
Daily mean °C (°F)	−14.5 (5.9)	−13.3 (8.1)	−8.8 (16.2)	−3.3 (26.1)	1.0 (33.8)	4.6 (40.3)	7.1 (44.8)	7.2 (45.0)	3.7 (38.7)	−2.6 (27.3)	−8.2 (17.2)	−12.4 (9.7)	−3.3 (26.1)
Source: NOAA
