= Tömönkü Norus =

Tömönkü Norus Төмөнкү Норус
- Location within Kyrgyzstan
- Coordinates: 42°55′12″N 74°44′24″E
- Country: Kyrgyzstan
- Region: Chüy
- District: Ysyk-Ata
- Elevation: 681 m (2,234 ft)

Population (2021)
  - Total: 1,191

Tömönkü Norus (Kyrgyz: Төмөнкү Норус, Russian: Нижний Норус, romanized: Nizhniy Norus) is a village in Ysyk-Ata District of the Chüy Region of Kyrgyzstan. Its population was 1,191 in 2021.
