= Sretensk (inhabited locality) =

Sretensk (Russian: Сретенск) is the name of several inhabited localities in Russia.

== Modern localities ==
Urban localities

- Sretensk, a town in Sretensky District of Zabaykalsky Krai

Rural localities

- Sretensk, Kirov Oblast, a selo in Perevozsky Rural Okrug of Nolinsky District in Kirov Oblast; 57°32′N 50°2′E

== Alternative names ==
- Sretensk, alternative name of Sretenskoye, a selo in Akhmanovsky Rural Okrug of Pizhansky District in Kirov Oblast; 57°21′N 48°39′E

== See also ==
- Sretensky, Russia (Sretenskoye, Sretenskaya), several rural localities in Russia
