= Aleksandrovka, Kyrgyzstan =

Aleksandrovka Александровка
- Location within Kyrgyzstan
- Coordinates: 42°51′10″N 74°13′10″E
- Country: Kyrgyzstan
- Region: Chüy
- District: Moskva

Population (2021)
  - Total: 14,577
- Time zone: UTC+6

Aleksandrovka (Kyrgyz: Александровка) is a village in Chüy Region of Kyrgyzstan. It is part of the Moskva District. The village was established in 1882. Its population was 14,577 in 2021. The village is located at Bishkek - Osh Road (European route E010) in Chüy Valley.

== Population ==
Historical population
Year	Pop.	±% p.a.
1993	11,803	—
2009	12,820	+0.52%
2021	14,577	+1.08%
Note: resident population; Sources:
