= Kyzyl-Aryk =

Kyzyl-Aryk Кызыл-Арык
- Location within Kyrgyzstan
- Coordinates: 42°42′N 75°04′E
- Country: Kyrgyzstan
- Region: Chüy Region
- District: Ysyk-Ata District
- Elevation: 1,160 m (3,810 ft)

Population (2021)
  - Total: 903

Kyzyl-Aryk is a village in the Ysyk-Ata District of Chüy Region of Kyrgyzstan. Its population was 903 in 2021.
