= Kyzylompol Range =

Kyzylompol
- Location within Kyrgyzstan

Highest point
- Elevation: 3,183 m (10,443 ft)
- Coordinates: 42°23′27.76″N 75°58′19.25″E

Dimensions
- Length: 20 km (12 mi) E–W
- Width: 13 km (8.1 mi) N–S

Naming
- Native name: Кызыломпол тоосу (Kyrgyz)

Geography
- Country: Kyrgyzstan
- Borders on: Kyrgyz Ala-Too Range, Issyk-Kul Basin

Geology
- Rock age: Paleozoic
- Rock type(s): Syenite, granite-syenite, granite

The Kyzylompol Range (Kyrgyz: Кызыломпол тоосу) is a mountain range in the Inner Tian Shan of Kyrgyzstan. It forms the eastern continuation of the Kyrgyz Ala-Too Range and lies west of the Issyk-Kul Basin. The range is 20 km (12 mi) long and 13 km (8.1 mi) wide. Its mean elevation is about 2,950 m, and its highest point reaches 3,183 m.

The range is composed mainly of Paleozoic syenite, granite-syenite, granite and other rocks. Remnants of ancient denudation surfaces occur along its crest. The slopes have gradients of 25–38° and are dissected by gullies and small valleys. To the west, the range gradually decreases in elevation and passes into Kubaky Pass, while to the east it descends into the Issyk-Kul Basin.

Dry-steppe landscapes predominate on the northern slopes, semi-desert landscapes on the southern slopes, and steppe landscapes in the western part.
