= Novonikolayevka, Kyrgyzstan =

Novonikolayevka Новониколаевка
- Location within Kyrgyzstan
- Coordinates: 42°49′50″N 73°53′20″E
- Country: Kyrgyzstan
- Region: Chüy
- District: Jayyl

Population (2021)
  - Total: 7,964
- Time zone: UTC+6

Novonikolayevka (Kyrgyz: Новониколаевка) is a village in Chüy Region of Kyrgyzstan. It is part of the Jayyl District. Its population was 7,964 in 2021.

== Population ==
Historical population
Year	Pop.	±% p.a.
2009	8,216	—
2021	7,964	−0.26%
Note: resident population; Sources:
