= Böksö-Jol =

Böksö-Jol Бөксө-Жол
- Location within Kyrgyzstan
- Coordinates: 42°42′40″N 73°53′25″E
- Country: Kyrgyzstan
- Region: Chüy
- District: Jayyl

Population (2021)
  - Total: 1,183
- Website: Official website

Böksö-Jol (Kyrgyz: Бөксө-Жол) is a village in the Jayyl District of Chüy Region of Kyrgyzstan. Its population was 1,183 in 2021. It is the seat of Taldy-Bulak rural community (ayyl aymagy). Bishkek - Osh road passes through the settlement.
