= Ak-Bashat, Jayyl =

Ak-Bashat Ак-Башат
- Location within Kyrgyzstan
- Coordinates: 42°53′03″N 73°54′49″E
- Country: Kyrgyzstan
- Region: Chüy Region
- District: Jayyl District
- Elevation: 700 m (2,300 ft)

Population (2021)
  - Total: 1,061
- Time zone: UTC+6

Ak-Bashat is a village in the Jayyl District of Chüy Region of Kyrgyzstan. Its population was 1,061 in 2021.
