= Ak-Suu, Chüy =

Ak-Suu
- Location within Kyrgyzstan
- Coordinates: 42°48′N 74°6′E
- Country: Kyrgyzstan
- Region: Chüy
- District: Moskva

Population (2021)
  - Total: 9,677

Ak-Suu is a village in the Chüy Region of Kyrgyzstan. Its population was 9,677 in 2021. It is the center of the Birinchi May rural community (ayyl aymagy) of the Moskva District. It is situated adjacent to the district center Belovodskoye.

== Population ==
Historical population
Year	Pop.	±% p.a.
1970	7,266	—
1979	8,739	+2.07%
1989	9,206	+0.52%
2009	8,281	−0.53%
2021	9,677	+1.31%
Note: resident population; Sources:
