= Tömön-Suu =

Tömön-Suu Төмөн-Суу
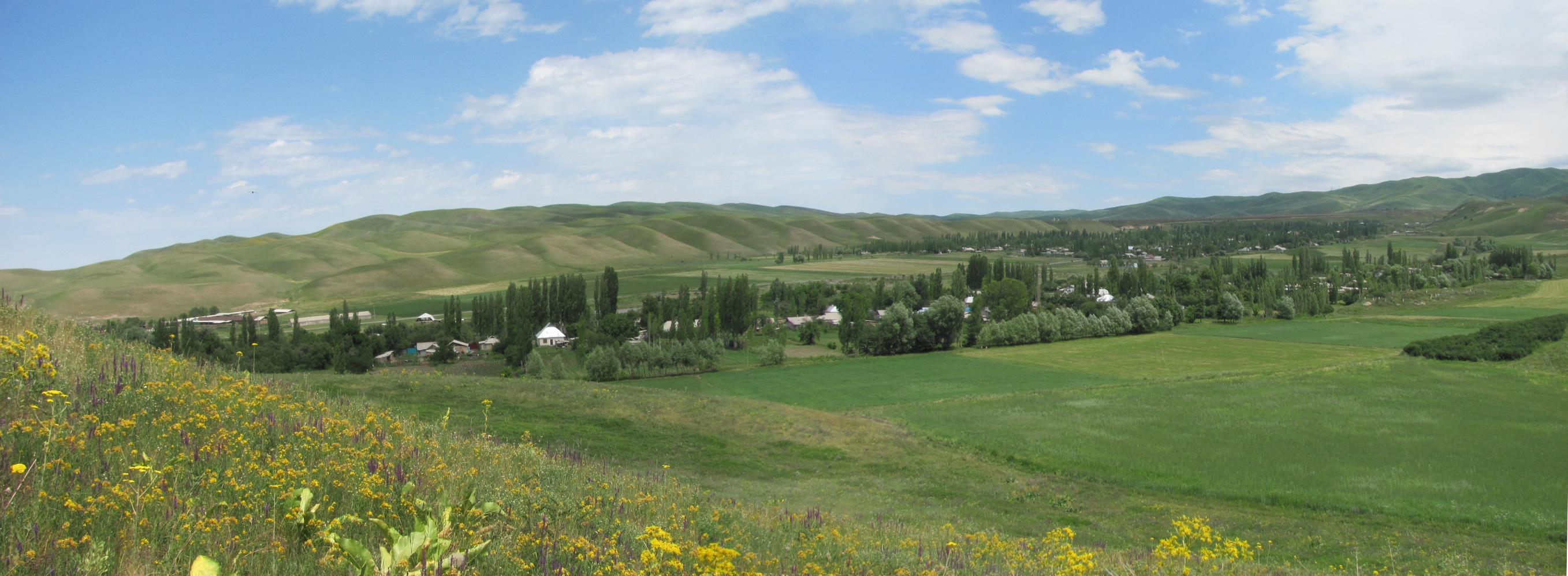
- The upper (southern) part of Tömön-Suu village as seen from the west

- Tömön-Suu and surrounding villages

- Location of Temen-Suu in Kyrgyzstan
- Coordinates: 42.697°N 74.022°E
- Country: Kyrgyzstan
- Region: Chüy
- District: Moskva
- Elevation: 732 m (2,402 ft)

Population (2021)
  - Total: 2,568

Tömön-Suu (Kyrgyz: Төмөн-Суу, Kyrgyz pronunciation: [tømønsúː], Russian: Темен-Суу, romanized: Temen-Suu) is a village in the Moskva district of Chüy Region in Kyrgyzstan. It is located 18 km south of Belovodskoye, the administrative center of Moskva district, and was part of the former Karl Marks Kolkhoz. While the village's historical Kyrgyz name and modern official name appearing in some government documents is Kyrgyz: Төмөн-Суу, romanized: Tömön-Suu, residents and most documents use the name Kyrgyz: Темен-Суу, romanized: Temen-Suu, even in Kyrgyz.

== Geography ==
Tömön-Suu is located 18 km south of Belovodskoye, situated among the foothills of the Kyrgyz Ala-Too range. The village is divided into 3 different regions: Artel (Kyrgyz: Артел) in the north, Ukraine (Kyrgyz: Уркаина) in the center, and Karl Marks (Kyrgyz: Карл Маркс) in the south.

Tömön-Suu is the administrative center for the Ak-Suu village council, which also includes the villages of Ak-Bashat, Ak-Torpok, Bala-Ayylchy, Keper-Aryk, Murake and Chong-Aryk.

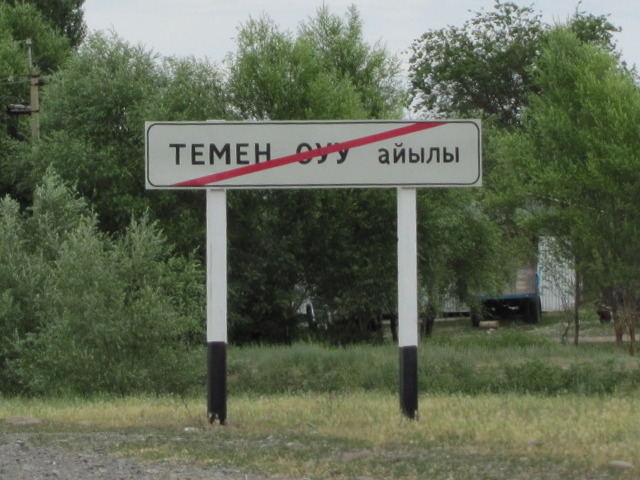
Leaving incorporated limits sign at north edge of village.

== Demographics ==
The population of Tömön-Suu was 2,568 in 2021. Tömön-Suu residents primarily earn their living from working the land and herding animals (especially cows).

== Sights ==
The village has a school, a hospital, a social hall ("club"), and a library. There is also a cheese factory, now privately owned. The village is also home to a memorial for fallen soldiers of World War II, as well as a statue of Karl Marx.
