= Gidrostroitel =

Gidrostroitel Гидростроитель
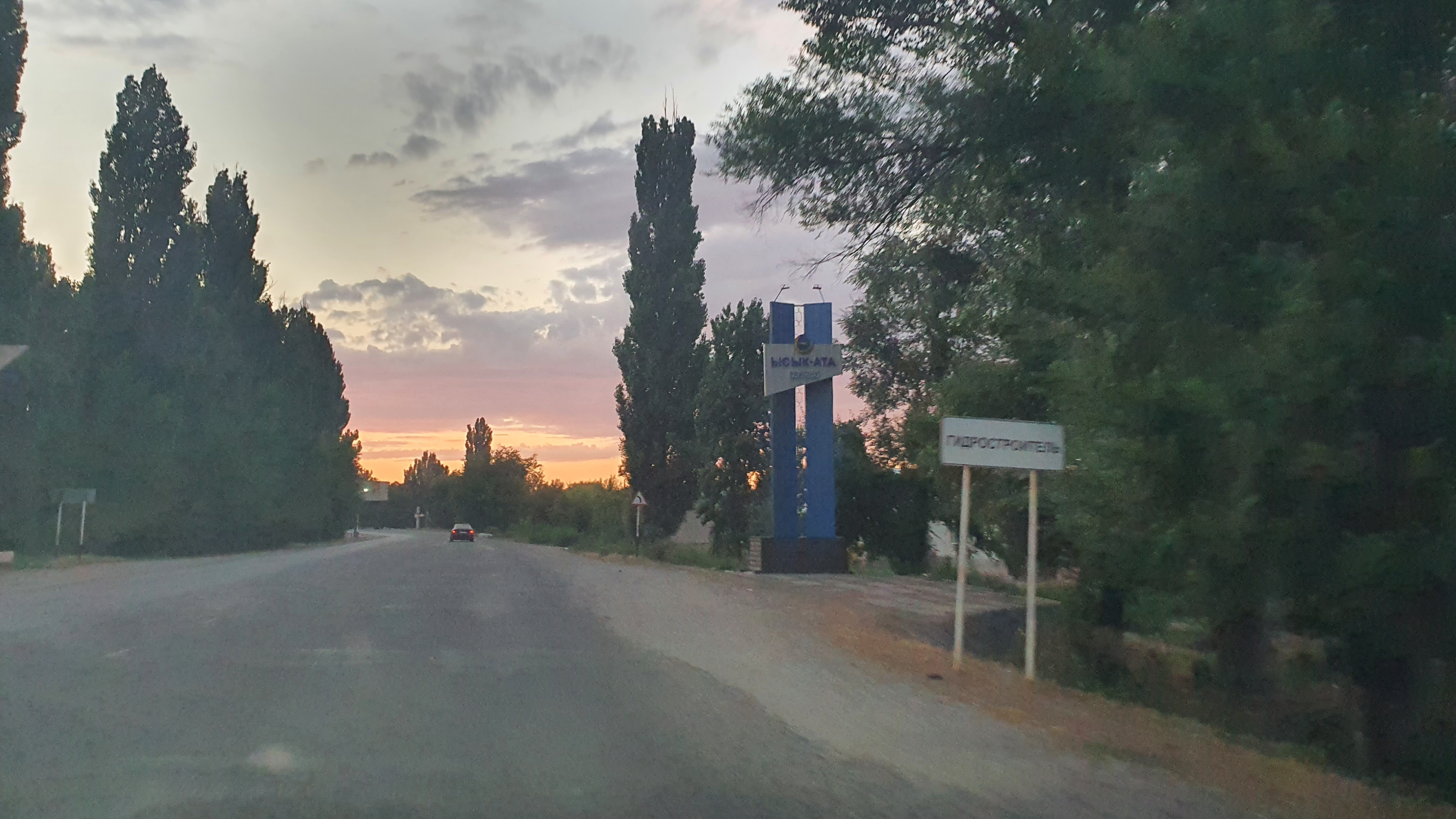

- Location within Kyrgyzstan
- Coordinates: 42°52′43″N 75°8′50″E
- Country: Kyrgyzstan
- Region: Chüy Region
- District: Ysyk-Ata District
- Elevation: 752 m (2,467 ft)

Population (2021)
  - Total: 988

Gidrostroitel is a village in the Ysyk-Ata District of Chüy Region of Kyrgyzstan. Its population was 988 in 2021.
