= Ysyk-Ata =

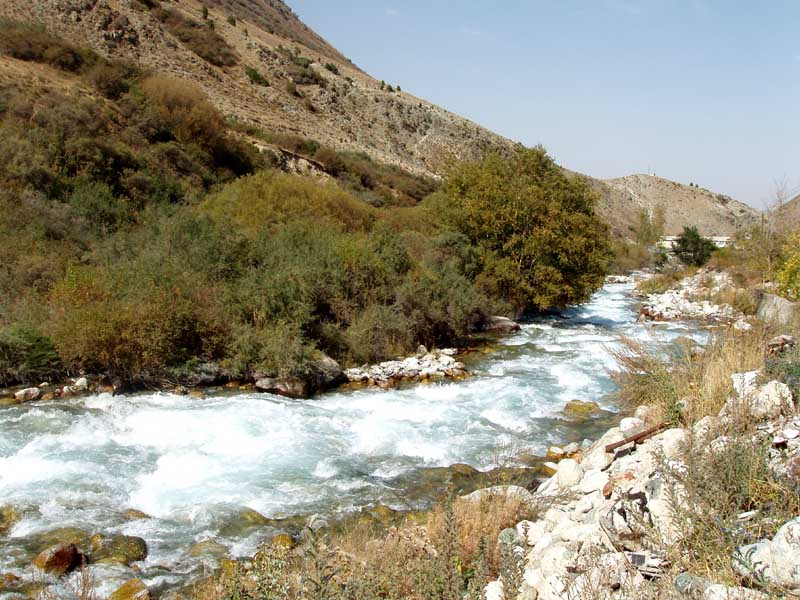
- Native name: Ысык-Ата (Kyrgyz)

Location
- Country: Kyrgyzstan
- Region: Chüy Region
- District: Ysyk-Ata District

Physical characteristics
- Source: Kyrgyz Ala-Too Range
- Mouth: Chu
  - coordinates: 42°58′22″N 74°54′10″E
- Length: 81 km (50 mi)
- Basin size: 558 km^{2} (215 sq mi)
- Discharge
  - minimum: 1.6 m^{3}/s (57 cu ft/s)
  - maximum: 45.8 m^{3}/s (1,620 cu ft/s)

Basin features
- Progression: Chu→ Betpak-Dala desert
- Tributaries
  - right: Tuyuk, Byty

The Ysyk-Ata (Kyrgyz: Ысык-Ата) is a river in Ysyk-Ata District of Chüy Region of Kyrgyzstan. The river rises on the north slopes of Kyrgyz Ala-Too and flows in north-north-east and north-east directions until confluence with its right tributary Tuyuk. Then the river flows northward entering the Chüy Valley. Ysyk-Ata is a left tributary of the Chu, the major watercourse of the valley. Four lakes with an area of 0.5 square kilometres (0.19 sq mi) and some 70 glaciers with a total area of 71.8 square kilometres (27.7 sq mi) are located in the river basin. Ysyk-Ata - a balneoclimatic resort is located at the river. Ysyk-Ata is 81 kilometres (50 mi) long, and has a drainage basin of 58 square kilometres (22 sq mi). The river's annual average flow rate is 7.06 m^{3}/s (249 cu ft/s) (near Yuryevka village) and weighted average elevation - 3030 m.
