= Predtechenka =

Predtechenka Предтеченка
- Location within Kyrgyzstan
- Coordinates: 42°57′09″N 74°03′23″E
- Country: Kyrgyzstan
- Region: Chüy Region
- District: Moskva District
- Predtechenka: 1914
- Elevation: 634 m (2,080 ft)

Population (2021)
  - Total: 1,665

Predtechenka (Russian: Предтеченка) is a village in the Moskva District of Chüy Region of Kyrgyzstan. Its population was 1,665 in 2021.
