= Poltavka, Kyrgyzstan =

Poltavka Полтавка
- Location within Kyrgyzstan
- Coordinates: 42°50′37″N 73°57′20″E
- Country: Kyrgyzstan
- Region: Chüy
- District: Jayyl
- Established: 1908

Population (2021)
  - Total: 4,700
- Time zone: UTC+6
- Website: Official website

Poltavka (Russian: Полтавка) is a village in the Jayyl District of Chüy Region of Kyrgyzstan established by migrants from Poltavshchyna of Ukraine in 1908. Its population was 4,700 in 2021. It is the center of Poltavka rural community (ayyl aymagy). Bishkek - Osh road passes through the settlement. Population is mostly Kyrgyz, Russian, and Ukrainian.
