= Sadovoye, Kyrgyzstan =

Sadovoye Садовое
- Location within Kyrgyzstan
- Coordinates: 42°51′10″N 74°10′20″E
- Country: Kyrgyzstan
- Region: Chüy
- District: Moskva

Population (2021)
  - Total: 10,545
- Time zone: UTC+6

Sadovoye (Kyrgyz: Садовое) is a village in Chüy Region of Kyrgyzstan established in 1908 It is part of the Moskva District. Its population was 10,545 in 2021.

== Population ==
Historical population
Year	Pop.	±% p.a.
1993	8,695	—
2009	9,988	+0.87%
2021	10,545	+0.45%
Note: resident population; Sources:
