= Spartak, Kyrgyzstan =

Spartak Спартак
- Location within Kyrgyzstan
- Coordinates: 43°2′N 74°8′E
- Country: Kyrgyzstan
- Region: Chüy
- District: Moskva
- Elevation: 615 m (2,018 ft)

Population (2021)
  - Total: 1,321

Spartak is a village in the Chüy Region of Kyrgyzstan. Its population was 1,321 in 2021. It is the center of the Chapayev rural community (ayyl aymagy) of the Moskva District. Other villages in the same ayyl aymagy are Ak-Söök and Malovodnoye.
