= Aydarbek, Jayyl =

Aydarbek Айдарбек
- Location within Kyrgyzstan
- Coordinates: 42°54′37″N 73°54′57″E
- Country: Kyrgyzstan
- Region: Chüy Region
- District: Jayyl District
- Elevation: 673 m (2,208 ft)

Population (2021)
  - Total: 731

Aydarbek is a village in the Jayyl District of Chüy Region of Kyrgyzstan. Its population was 731 in 2021.
