= Philipp Kreuels =

German footballer

Personal information
- Date of birth: 11 January 1985 (age 41)
- Place of birth: Düsseldorf, West Germany
- Position: Attacking midfielder

Youth career
- PSV Düsseldorf
- –2003: Fortuna Düsseldorf
- 2003–2004: Rot-Weiss Essen

Senior career*
Years	Team	Apps	(Gls)
2004–2005	Rot-Weiss Essen	0	(0)
2005–2012	VfL Wolfsburg II	156	(41)
2012–2013	SV Babelsberg 03	31	(7)
2013–2014	1. FC Saarbrücken	9	(0)
2014–2015	Rot-Weiß Oberhausen	6	(1)
Total		202	(49)
- * Club domestic league appearances and goals

Philipp Kreuels (born 11 January 1985) is a German former professional footballer who played for SV Babelsberg 03 and VfL Wolfsburg II, as well as 1. FC Saarbrücken. Over the course of his career, he had more than 100 appearances in the regional league and over 40 in the 3. Liga.
