= Sosnovka, Kyrgyzstan =

Sosnovka Сосновка
- Location within Kyrgyzstan
- Coordinates: 42°40′32″N 73°54′22″E
- Country: Kyrgyzstan
- Region: Chüy
- District: Jayyl
- Established: 1912

Area
  - Total: 4 km^{2} (1.5 sq mi)

Population (2021)
  - Total: 5,972
- Website: Official website

Sosnovka (Russian: Сосновка) is a village in the Jayyl District of Chüy Region of Kyrgyzstan. Its population was 5,972 in 2021. It is the center and the only village in Sosnovka rural community (ayyl aymagy). Bishkek - Osh road passes through Sosnovka.

== History and Etymology ==
The village of Sosnovka was founded in 1908 on the site of a winter camp (kyshtoo) of the Kyrgyz Solto tribe, in the locality historically known as Tash-Aryk (Kyrgyz: Таш-Арык, “Stone irrigation canal”). The origin of the name Sosnovka is attributed either to Nikolai Petrovich Sosnovsky, a land surveyor involved in the distribution of land among settlers, or to the local coniferous tree archa (a Tien Shan juniper species), which is sometimes rendered into Russian as “pine”.

During the Stolypin agrarian reforms (1908–1912), peasants and Cossacks from the southern and central provinces of the Russian Empire began to resettle en masse in Turkestan. Most of the migration to the lands of the Solto tribe came from Little Russia (present-day Ukraine), the Orenburg Governorate, and Stavropol. In 1914, a special redistribution of land was carried out for the new European settlers.

== Population ==
Historical population
Year	Pop.	±% p.a.
2009	5,568	—
2021	5,972	+0.59%
Note: resident population; Sources:
