= Ivanovka, Kyrgyzstan =

Ivanovka Ивановка
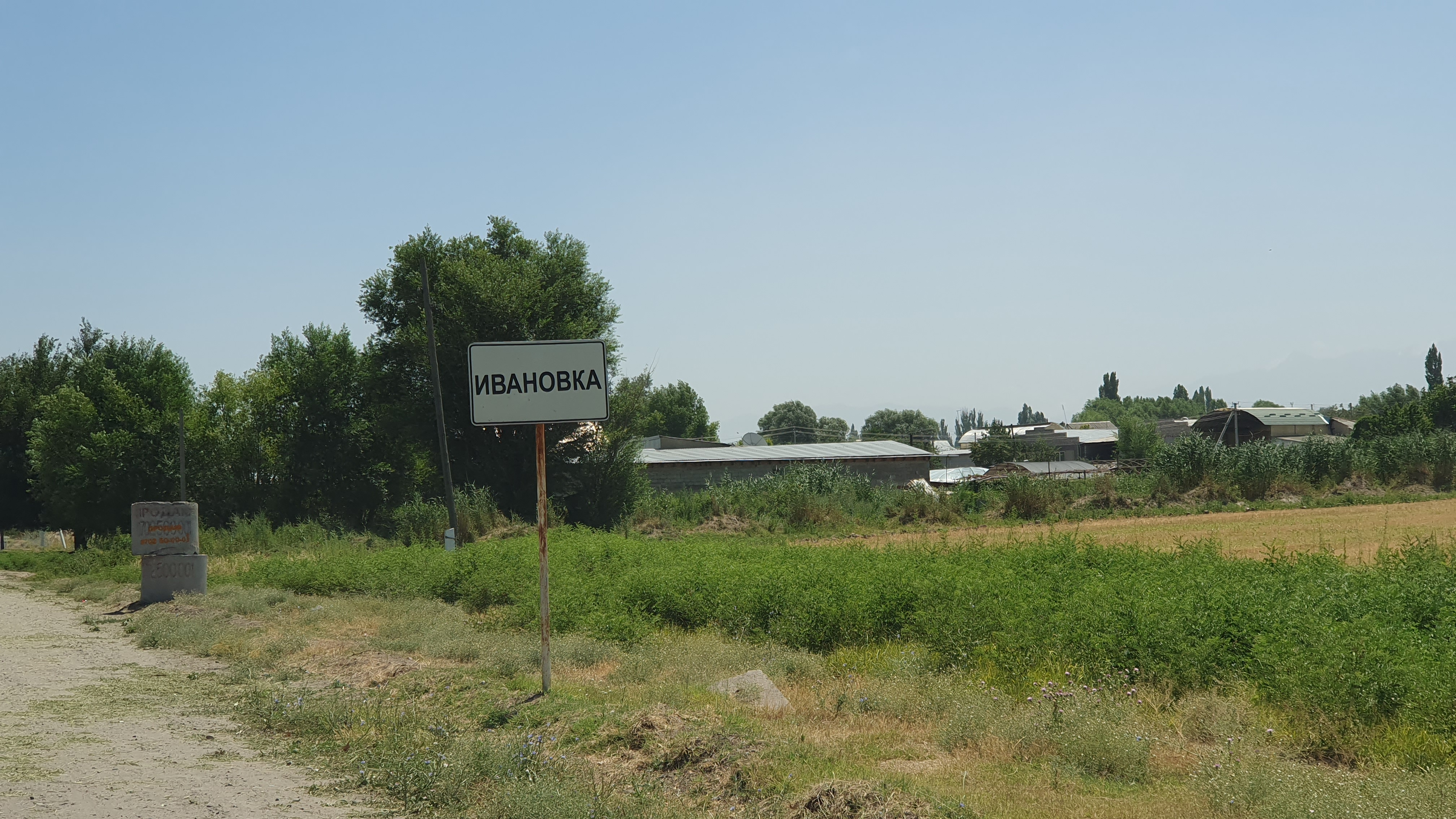

- Location within Kyrgyzstan
- Coordinates: 42°53′11″N 75°04′56″E
- Country: Kyrgyzstan
- Region: Chüy Region
- District: Ysyk-Ata District
- Established: 1888

Population (2021)
  - Total: 17,513

Ivanovka (Russian: Ивановка) is a village in the Ysyk-Ata District of the Chüy Region, of Kyrgyzstan, approximately midway between Tokmok and Kant. Its population was 17,513 in 2021. It is known for its multi-ethnic composition, including Kyrgyz, Russians and Dungans. Its economy focuses on agriculture in the Chüy Valley, Kyrgyzstan's largest northern agricultural area.

== Population ==
Historical population
Year	Pop.	±% p.a.
1970	9,962	—
1979	11,647	+1.75%
1989	14,360	+2.12%
2009	16,052	+0.56%
2021	17,513	+0.73%
Note: resident population; Sources:
