= Yuryevka, Kyrgyzstan =

Yuryevka Юрьевка (Russian)
- Location within Kyrgyzstan
- Coordinates: 42°42′55″N 75°02′04″E
- Country: Kyrgyzstan
- Region: Chüy Region
- District: Ysyk-Ata District
- Established: 1909
- Elevation: 1,095 m (3,593 ft)

Population (2021)
  - Total: 4,205

Yuryevka (Russian: Юрьевка) is a village in the Ysyk-Ata District of Chüy Region of Kyrgyzstan located on the right bank of Ysyk-Ata. The village officially recognised in 1909. Its population was 4,205 in 2021.

Yuryevka is known for its significant German population, constituting just under 10% of the village's residents. Many of these Germans settled in areas around Yuryevka during the reign of Catherine the Great, Queen of the Russian Empire from 1762 to 1796, who introduced reforms encouraging the migration of Germans to Russia, to farm arable lands along the Volga and Chu rivers. Many of these Germans, however, were displaced during the First and Second World Wars, leading to the ethnic cleansing of the Germans living in Yuryevka.

A popular Youtube video was posted on the 8 of September, 2016, titled "Kyrgyzstan's Germans: Ethnic minority fading away in central Asia state"
