= Ak-Say, Chüy =

Ak-Say Ак-Сай
- Location within Kyrgyzstan
- Coordinates: 42°44′46″N 75°03′34″E
- Country: Kyrgyzstan
- Region: Chüy Region
- District: Ysyk-Ata District
- Elevation: 1,020 m (3,350 ft)

Population (2021)
  - Total: 950
- Time zone: UTC+6

Ak-Say (Kyrgyz: Ак-Сай) is a village in the Ysyk-Ata District of Chüy Region of Kyrgyzstan. Its population was 950 in 2021.
