= Stavropolovka =

- Location within Kyrgyzstan
- Coordinates: 43°0′50″N 73°51′20″E
- Country: Kyrgyzstan
- Region: Chüy Region
- District: Jayyl District
- Elevation: 615 m (2,018 ft)

Population (2021)
  - Total: 1,285

Stavropolovka is a village in Jayyl District of the Chüy Region of Kyrgyzstan. It was established in 1912. Its population was 1,285 in 2021.
