= Ak-Suu (Chu) =

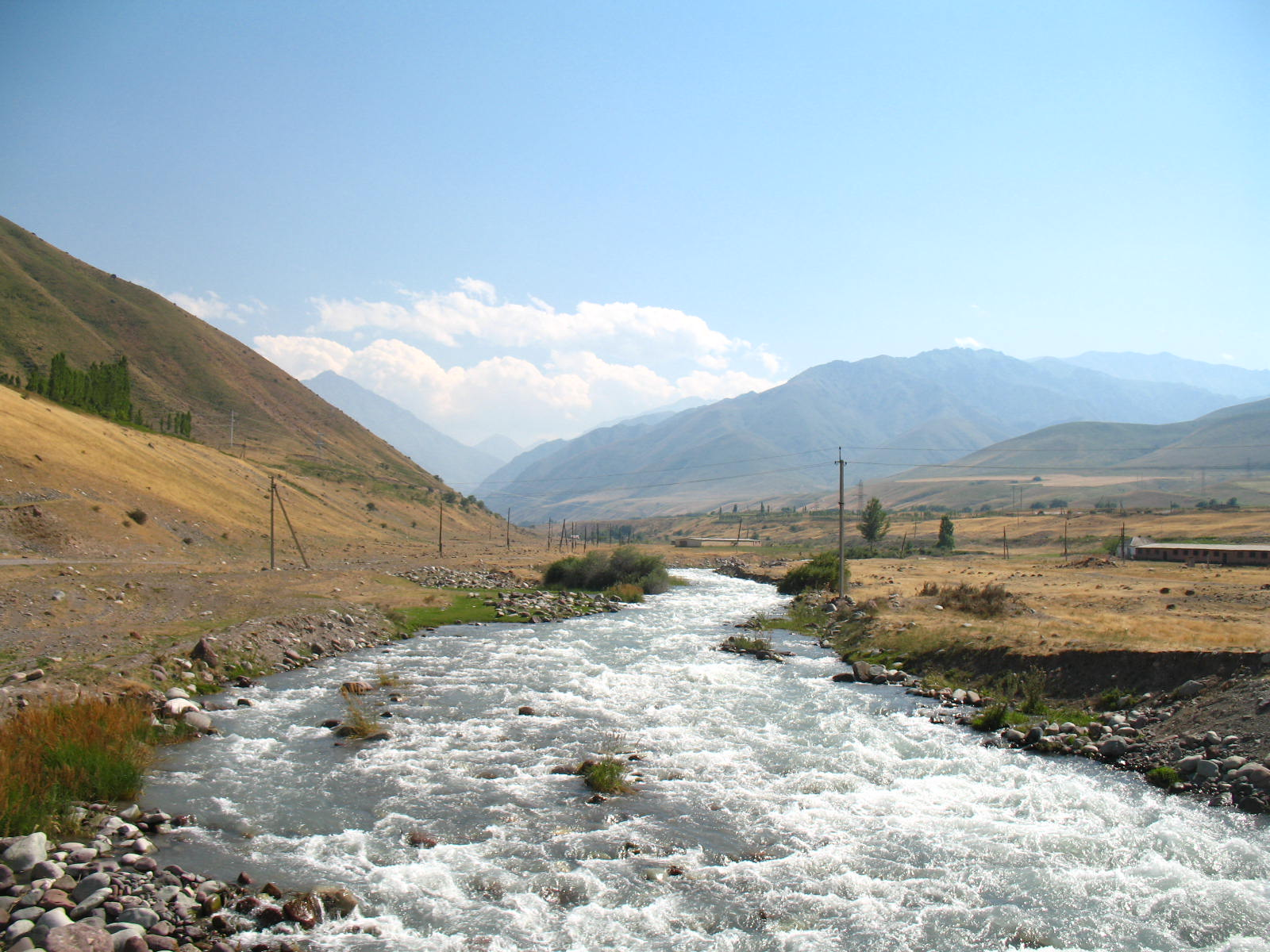
- The Ak-Suu flowing from the Narzan Valley past the village of Jardy-Suu
- Native name: Ак-Суу (Kyrgyz)

Location
- Country: Kyrgyzstan, Kazakhstan
- Region: Chüy Region, Jambyl Region

Physical characteristics
- Source
  - location: Chüy Region, Kyrgyzstan
- Mouth: Chu
  - location: Kazakhstan
  - coordinates: 43°20′17″N 73°58′12″E
  - elevation: 515 m (1,690 ft)
- Length: 155 km (96 mi)
- Basin size: 483 km^{2} (186 sq mi)

Basin features
- Progression: Chu→ Betpak-Dala desert
- Tributaries
  - right: Temen-Suu

The Ak-Suu or Aqsu (Kyrgyz: Ак-Суу [ɑq suː], Kazakh: Ақсу Aqsū, both meaning "white water") is a river running through mostly Moskva District, Chüy Region, Kyrgyzstan and Shu District, Jambyl Region, Kazakhstan. It is 155 kilometres (96 mi) long, and has a drainage basin of 483 square kilometres (186 sq mi). It takes its rise on the northern slope of the Kyrgyz Ala-Too, and it runs through the Narzan Valley north into the Chüy Valley and through the city of Belovodskoye, which is named after it. It flows into the Chu (left tributary) in southern Kazakhstan.
