= Moskva District, Kyrgyzstan =

Coordinates: 42.829006°N 74.123346°E

Moskva District Москва району
- District
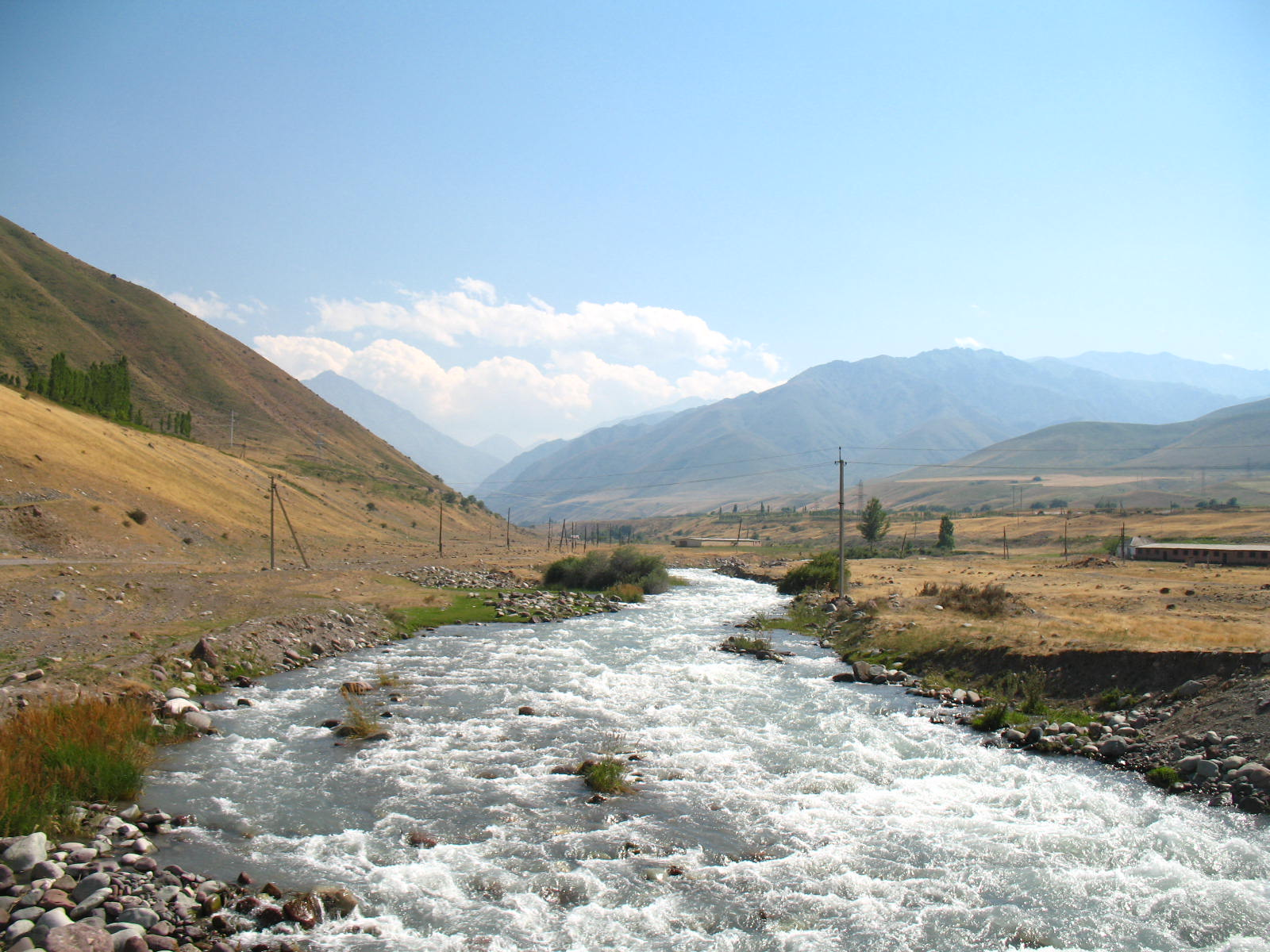
- The river Ak-Suu flowing from the Narzan valley into the south end of Jardy-Suu village.

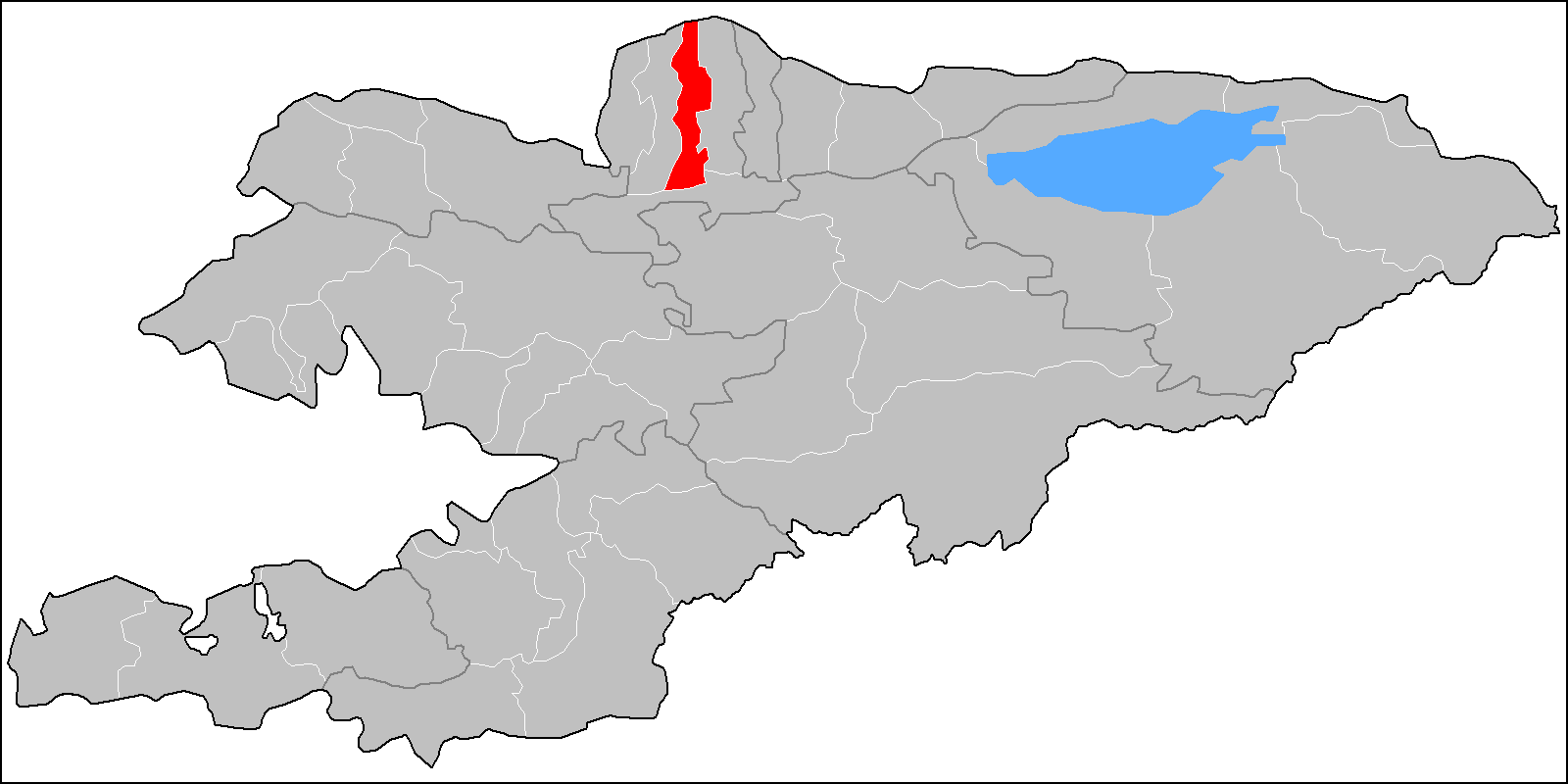
- Country: Kyrgyzstan
- Region: Chüy Region
- Stalin District: 1930

Area
  - Total: 2,056 km^{2} (794 sq mi)

Population (2021)
  - Total: 103,007
  - Density: 50.10/km^{2} (129.8/sq mi)
- Time zone: UTC+6

Moskva District (Kyrgyz: Москва району) is a district of Chüy Region in northern Kyrgyzstan. Its area is 2,056 square kilometres (794 sq mi), and its resident population was 103,007 in 2021. The administrative seat lies at Belovodskoye.

== History ==
Moskva District was established as Stalin District on July 23, 1930. In 1961, as part of de-Stalinization, it was renamed into Moskva District, after the city of Moscow.

== Population ==
Moskva District is ethnically diverse. A plurality of the population (46.1%) are ethnic Kyrgyz. Large minority of Russians (23.3%) and Dungans inhabit in the district as well. Smaller population of Uzbeks, Ukrainians, and Kurds also inhabit in the district.

Historical population
Year	Pop.	±% p.a.
1970	65,403	—
1979	72,895	+1.21%
1989	83,802	+1.40%
1999	83,608	−0.02%
2009	84,443	+0.10%
2021	103,007	+1.67%
Note: resident population; Sources:

The proportion of ethnicities in Moskva District
Ethnicity	Percentage
Kyrgyz	46.1%
Russians	23.3%
Dungans	18.7%
Uzbeks	2.5%
Ukrainians	2.5%
Kurds	1.4%
Uyghurs	1.1%
Kazakhs	0.9%
Note: resident population; Sources:

== Rural communities and villages ==
In total, Moskva District includes 28 settlements in 12 rural communities (ayyl aymagy). Each rural community can include one or several villages. The rural communities and settlements in the Moskva District are:

1. Ak-Suu (seat: Tömön-Suu; and also villages Ak-Bashat, Ak-Torpok, Bala-Ayylchi, Keper-Aryk, Murake and Chong-Aryk)
2. Aleksandrovka (seat: Aleksandrovka; incl. Besh-Örük and Krupskaya)
3. Belovodskoye (seat: Belovodskoye; incl. Kosh-Döbö)
4. Besh-Terek (seat: Besh-Terek)
5. Birinchi May (seat: Ak-Suu)
6. Chapaev (seat: Spartak; incl. Ak-Söök and Malovodnoye)
7. Petrovka (seat: Petrovka; incl. Zavodskoye and Kyzyl-Tuu)
8. Predtechenka (seat: Predtechenka; incl. Ang-Aryk)
9. Sadovy (seat: Sadovoye)
10. Sretenka (seat: Sretenka; incl. Bolshevik and Zarya)
11. Tölök (seat: Tölök)
12. Tselinny (seat: Kyz-Molo)
Map of the inhabited part of the Moskva District
