= Sretenka =

Sretenka Сретенка
- Location within Kyrgyzstan
- Coordinates: 42°55′48″N 74°7′48″E
- Country: Kyrgyzstan
- Region: Chüy Region
- District: Moskva District
- Established: 1891
- Elevation: 629 m (2,064 ft)

Population (2021)
  - Total: 4,226

Sretenka (Kyrgyz: Сретенка, also: Ak-Kyrcho) is a village in the Moskva District of Chüy Region of Kyrgyzstan. Its population was 4,226 in 2021.
