= Syn-Tash =

Syn-Tash Сын-Таш
- Location within Kyrgyzstan
- Coordinates: 42°42′11″N 75°03′36″E
- Country: Kyrgyzstan
- Region: Chüy Region
- District: Ysyk-Ata District
- Elevation: 1,150 m (3,770 ft)

Population (2021)
  - Total: 1,023

Syn-Tash (or Syntash) is a village in the Ysyk-Ata District of Chüy Region of Kyrgyzstan. Its population was 1,023 in 2021.
