= Alekseyevka, Chüy =

Alekseyevka
- Location within Kyrgyzstan
- Coordinates: 42°49′N 73°49′E
- Country: Kyrgyzstan
- Region: Chüy Region
- District: Jayyl District

Population (2021)
  - Total: 7,991

Alekseyevka is a village in Chüy Region of Kyrgyzstan. Its population was 7,991 in 2021. Alekseyevka is situated approximately 40 mi (64 km) west of the nation’s capital, Bishkek.

== Population ==
Historical population
Year	Pop.	±% p.a.
2009	5,730	—
2021	7,991	+2.81%
Note: resident population; Sources:
