= Kyrgyz Ala-Too Range =

Mountain range in northern Kyrgyzstan and Kazakhstan

Kyrgyz Ala-Too
- Alexander Range (until 1933)
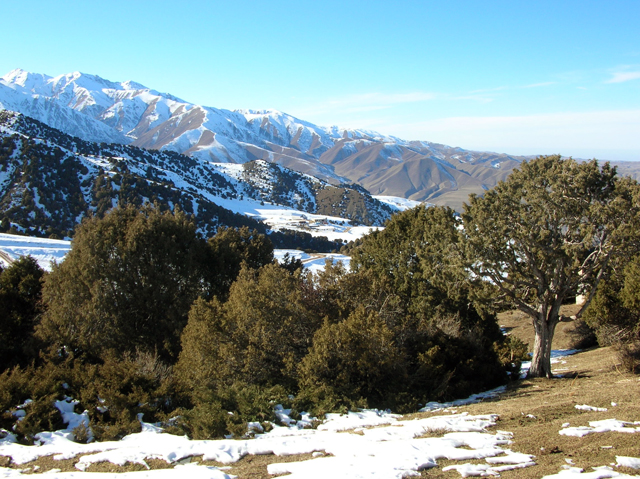

Highest point
- Peak: Semenov-Tian-Shansky Peak
- Elevation: 4,895 m (16,060 ft)

Dimensions
- Length: 454 km (282 mi) E-W
- Width: 40 km (25 mi) N-S

Naming
- Native name: Кыргыз Ала-Тоосу (Kyrgyz)

Geography
- Location within Kyrgyzstan
- Countries: Kyrgyzstan and Kazakhstan
- Region: Chüy Region
- Range coordinates: 42°30′N 74°35′E

The Kyrgyz Ala-Too (Note: Kyrgyz: Кыргыз Ала-Тоосу, romanized: Kyrgyz Ala-Toosu, IPA: [qɯɾʁɯ́s ɑɫɑ́‿tʰoːsʊ́]; Kazakh: Қырғыз Алатауы, romanized: Qyrğyz Alatauy, IPA: [qɤɾʁɤ́s ɑɫɑ́‿tʰɑʊ̯ə́]), also known as the Kyrgyz Alatau and Kyrgyz Range, and historically as the Alexander Range, is a large mountain range in the northern Tian Shan. It extends roughly east–west for 454 km (282 mi) from the Kyzylompol Range, west of Issyk-Kul, to Taraz in Kazakhstan, and is up to 40 km (25 mi) wide. It separates the Chüy Valley from the Talas, Suusamyr and Kochkor Valley. Its mean elevation is about 3,700 m (12,100 ft), and its highest point reaches 4,895 m (16,060 ft). In the eastern part of the range, many summits exceed 4,000 m (13,000 ft).

The Talas Ala-Too Range branches from the southern side of the Kyrgyz Ala-Too near Töö Ashuu, while the western section of the range forms part of the natural border between Kyrgyzstan and Kazakhstan.

Several protected areas are located on the Kyrgyz Ala-Too, mainly on its northern slopes, including Ala Archa National Park, and the Ak-Suu Integrated Reserve

== History of the name ==
On early Russian maps, the range was known as Kirgiznin Alatau (Russian: Киргизнин Алатау). In 1860, Gustav Khristianovich Gasfort, Governor-General of Western Siberia, proposed naming it the Alexander Range (Russian: Александровский хребет). According to geographer Vladimir Petrov, Gasfort associated the proposed name with both Emperor Alexander II of Russia and Alexander the Great, as he believed that Russian expansion under Alexander II had reached a mountain range that marked the northern limit of Alexander the Great's conquests.

On 21 October 1860, Russian Minister of War Nikolay Sukhozanet informed the Governor-General that Emperor Alexander II had approved the name, and Alexander Range subsequently appeared on Russian military maps.

The name was officially changed on 1 April 1933, when the All-Russian Central Executive Committee adopted a resolution renaming the Alexander Range the Kyrgyz Range (Russian: Киргизский хребет).

== Relief ==
The Kyrgyz Ala-Too forms a large and complex anticlinorium. On its southern side, the Talas Ala-Too Range branches off near Töö Ashuu, while the Karamoynok Range branches off near Issyk-Ata Pass. The watershed ridge is rocky, with sharp, pyramid-shaped peaks and characteristic alpine-type relief.

The slopes are asymmetric. The southern slopes are relatively short, whereas the northern slopes are broad, with some spurs extending for as much as 30 km (19 mi). In the eastern part of the northern slope there are foothills and isolated uplands reaching elevations of up to 2,000 m (6,600 ft), while denudation surfaces occur in the western part.

Numerous gorges and valleys dissect both slopes. The largest include Ashmara, Chon-Kayyndy, Kara-Balta, Ak-Suu, Sokuluk, Ala-Archa, Alamedin, Issyk-Ata, Kegeti, Shamshy, and the West and East Karakol valleys.

According to relief type, the Kyrgyz Ala-Too is divided into high mountains, middle-altitude mountains, low mountains and foothills. The high-mountain zone, above 2,500 m (8,200 ft), is characterized by traces of former glaciation and by modern glaciers, cirques, glacial valley heads, trough-shaped valleys and rocky cliffs. The middle-altitude mountains, at elevations of about 2,000 to 3,000 m (6,600 to 9,800 ft), are characterized by broad gorges and narrow ridges. The low mountains have levelled denudation ridges and broad-bottomed valleys filled with sediment.

Small tectonic valleys, including Jelargy, Oktorkoy and Kokjarsuu, occur in the eastern part of the range. The foothills are dissected by gullies and small valleys, while their broad ridges are divided into separate massifs by the valleys of major rivers.

== Geology ==
Structurally, the Kyrgyz Ala-Too is a mega-anticline. It is separated by tectonic faults from the Chüy megasyncline to the north and from the synclinal structures of the Talas, Suusamyr and Kochkor valleys to the south.

The oldest rocks are Precambrian metamorphosed crystalline schist, quartzite and gneiss, which form the basement of the range. They are overlain with an angular unconformity by thick sequences of volcanic and sedimentary rocks belonging to the Caledonian structural stage.

The Epicaledonian structural stage, of Devonian–Permian age, consists of porphyritic tuffs and sedimentary rocks, predominantly red-coloured continental and continental-marine formations. Granitoid intrusions of Precambrian and Early Paleozoic age are widespread, while gabbroic rocks occur locally. Syenite and granite-syenite formed during the Late Paleozoic occur in considerably smaller massifs.

On the northern side of the range, Cenozoic unconsolidated continental sediments occur in nearly horizontal strata. Paleogene–Neogene deposits form a belt of foothills.

=== Mineral resources ===
Lead ore was mined for a long period within the range at the Bordu deposit. Deposits of ceramic raw materials at Aksuu and ornamental stone at Kyzylompol are of industrial importance. Other known mineral resources include pyrite at the Achyktash deposit, rock salt at the Jeldisuu deposit, natural construction materials, and polymetallic and copper ores.

Health resorts operate on the basis of the Issyk-Ata and Alamedin mineral thermal springs. Mineral water from Aksuu (Jartash) is commercially bottled for drinking.

== Climate ==
The climate is moderately continental and varies considerably with elevation. Mean January temperatures range from −5 to −4 °C (23 to 25 °F) in the foothills to −25 to −20 °C (−13 to −4 °F) at elevations of 4,000 to 4,500 m (13,100 to 14,800 ft). Mean July temperatures range from 20 to 23 °C (68 to 73 °F) in the foothills to 0 to 5 °C (32 to 41 °F) along the crest.

Annual precipitation ranges from 300 to 400 mm (12 to 16 in) at the foot of the mountains to 800 to 1,000 mm (31 to 39 in) near the main ridge.

== Glaciers ==
The Kyrgyz Ala-Too contains 582 glaciers with a total area of about 520 km^{2} (200 sq mi). Of these, 483 glaciers, covering 471 km^{2} (182 sq mi), are located on the northern slopes, while 99 glaciers, covering 49 km^{2} (19 sq mi), are on the southern slopes.

Most glaciers are concentrated in the central part of the range. Between Kara-Balta and Shamshy alone, glaciers cover about 300 km^{2} (120 sq mi). The largest glaciers include Topkaragay (6.4 km^{2} (2.5 sq mi)), Keng-Tor (10.0 km^{2} (3.9 sq mi)), Golubin (9.4 km^{2} (3.6 sq mi)), Tuyuk (8.5 km^{2} (3.3 sq mi)) and Chong-Tor (6.1 km^{2} (2.4 sq mi)). The snow line lies at elevations of approximately 3,750 to 4,100 m (12,300 to 13,450 ft).

== Hydrology ==
The rivers of the Kyrgyz Ala-Too belong to the drainage basins of the Chu, Naryn and Talas.

Major rivers on the northern slope include the Ysyk-Ata, with a mean annual discharge of 7.2 m^{3}/s (250 cu ft/s), Alamüdün (6.3 m^{3}/s (220 cu ft/s)), Kara-Balta (5.3 m^{3}/s (190 cu ft/s)) and Sokuluk (5.2 m^{3}/s (180 cu ft/s)). On the southern slope are the East Karakol, with a mean annual discharge of 4.8 m^{3}/s (170 cu ft/s), as well as tributaries of the Kökömeren, Suusamyr and Karakol rivers in the Talas basin.

The rivers are fed mainly by snow and glacier melt. Their high-water period begins in April–May, and discharge starts to decline in August–September.

== Protected areas ==
Several protected areas are located on the Kyrgyz Ala-Too, principally on its northern slopes. The largest is Ala-Archa Nature Park, which protects the high-mountain landscapes of the central part of the range. The Ak-Suu Integrated Reserve protects natural ecosystems on the northern slopes in the basin of the Ak-Suu River. Smaller protected areas include the Chong-Kuurchak Botanical Reserve and the natural monuments of Kögüchkön-Sugat and Ysyk-Ata waterfalls. The Chong-Aryk Botanical Reserve is situated in the northern foothills of the range.

== Soils and vegetation ==
The soils and vegetation of the Kyrgyz Ala-Too show pronounced altitudinal zonation. On the northern slope, dry steppe and steppe landscapes occur at elevations of about 700 to 1,000 m (2,300 to 3,300 ft) on light chestnut soils. The vegetation includes wormwood, salt-tolerant herbs, feather grasses and other xerophytic species.

At 1,000 to 1,600 m (3,300 to 5,200 ft), steppe vegetation occurs on dark chestnut soils and includes fescue, wormwood, wheatgrass, Caragana and other species. At elevations of about 1,600 to 1,900 m (5,200 to 6,200 ft), meadow-steppe vegetation occurs on chernozem soils.

The forest-steppe and meadow belt, between approximately 1,900 to 2,700 m (6,200 to 8,900 ft), occurs on dark mountain-forest and mountain-meadow soils. Tien Shan spruce grows mainly on shaded slopes and juniper on sunny slopes, accompanied by meadow vegetation, rowan, birch, willow and various shrubs.

Above this are the subalpine belt at approximately 2,700 to 3,100 m (8,900 to 10,200 ft), alpine meadows at 3,100 to 3,500 m (10,200 to 11,500 ft), and the glacial-nival zone above about 3,500 m (11,500 ft).

Tree vegetation is absent from the southern slopes. Mountain-steppe landscapes predominate there at elevations of about 2,300 to 2,900 m (7,500 to 9,500 ft), while stony semi-desert occurs in the foothills at about 1,700 to 2,300 m (5,600 to 7,500 ft). The other altitudinal landscape belts resemble those on the northern slope, but are drier and occur approximately 300 to 400 m (980 to 1,310 ft) higher.

== Fauna ==
The fauna includes brown bear, snow leopard, Eurasian lynx, wolf, roe deer, Siberian ibex, marten, red fox, golden eagle, saker falcon, snowcock, chukar partridge, marmot, polecat and other mountain species.

== Land use and transport ==
The Kyrgyz Ala-Too is used mainly for grazing. Well-known summer pastures include Saralasaz and Suusamyr. Most of the flat and gently sloping land in the foothills and intermontane valleys is cultivated.

Areas north of the range are connected with valleys and summer pastures on its southern side by the Shamshy, Issyk-Ata, Ala-Archa and Sokuluk passes. The European route E010, commonly known as Bishkek–Osh road crosses the range through a tunnel at Töö Ashuu.

== Notable peaks ==
- Semenov-Tian-Shansky Peak (4895 m)
- Korona Peak (4860 m)
- Free Korea Peak (4740 m)
- Vladimir Putin Peak (4446 m)

== See also ==
- Ysyk-Ata Resort
