= Sretensky, Russia =

Name of several Russian rural localities

Sretensky (Russian: Сретенский; masculine), Sretenskaya (Сретенская; feminine), or Sretenskoye (Сретенское; neuter) is the name of several rural localities in Russia:

- Sretenskoye, Kirov Oblast, a selo in Akhmanovsky Rural Okrug of Pizhansky District of Kirov Oblast
- Sretenskoye, Perm Krai, a selo in Ilyinsky District of Perm Krai
