= Belovodskoye =

Belovodskoye Беловодское
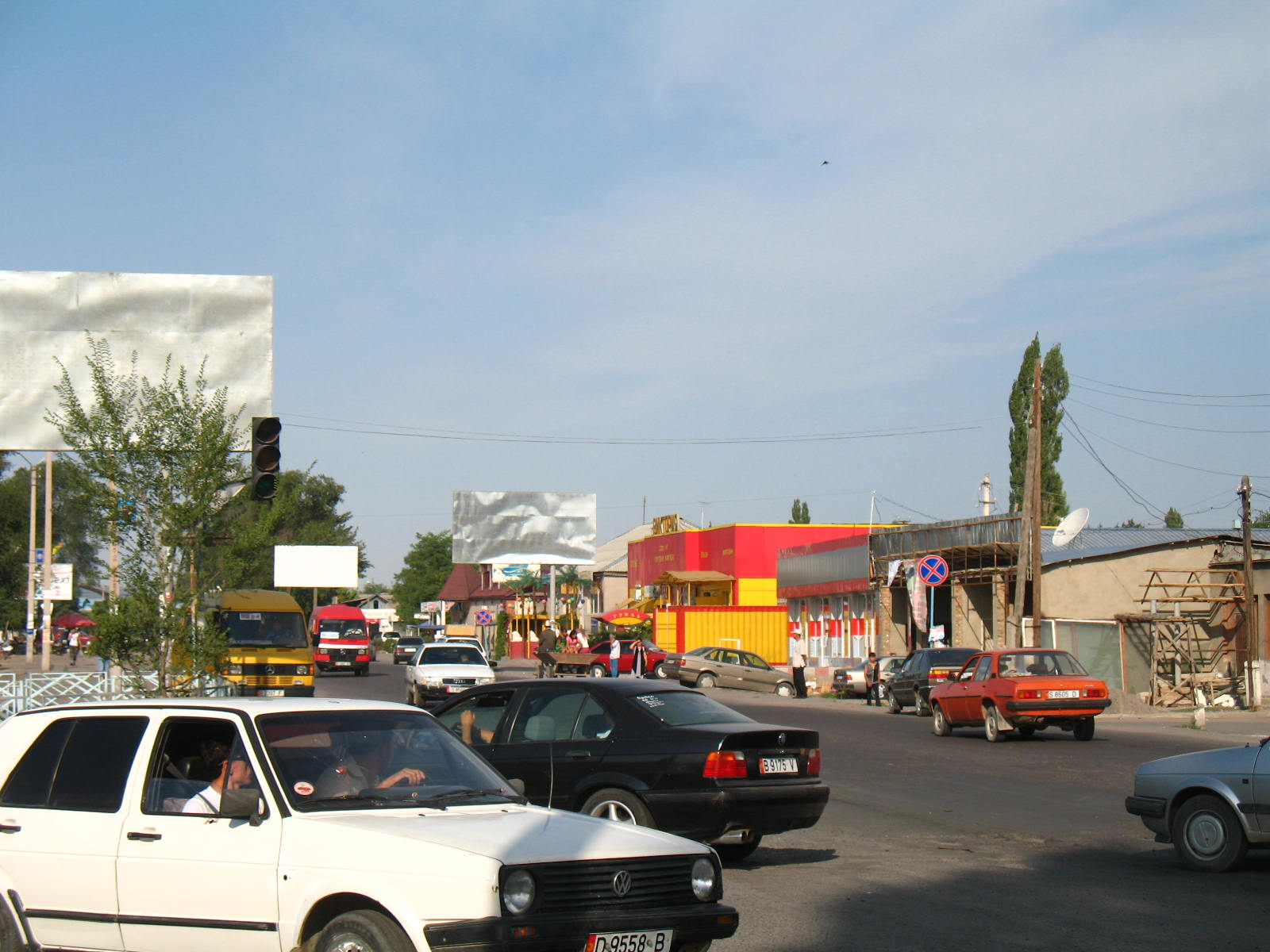
- The main road through Belovodsk, looking west towards Kara-Balta.

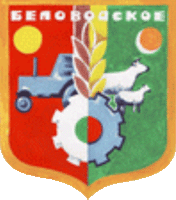
- Coat of arms

- Location within Kyrgyzstan
- Coordinates: 42°49′48″N 74°6′0″E
- Country: Kyrgyzstan
- Region: Chüy Region
- District: Moskva District
- Established: 1868
- Elevation: 732 m (2,402 ft)

Population (2021)
  - Total: 23,046

Belovodskoye (Kyrgyz and Russian: Беловодское) is a large village in the Chüy Region of Kyrgyzstan. Its population was 23,046 in 2021. It is the administrative seat of Moskva District, and is located on the European route E40 (M39) Bishkek to Chimkent highway.

== Population ==
Historical population
Year	Pop.	±% p.a.
2009	21,275	—
2021	23,046	+0.67%
Note: resident population; Sources:

== History ==
Belovodskoye was established by 12 families of back settlers from Astrakhan Governorate of Russian Empire in spring 1868. The settlement was called Belovodskoye ("white water" in Russian) by the name of the river Ak-Suu ("white water" in Kyrgyz) close to which it was laid. The first street in the village was named Astrakhan. Later the settlers from other areas of the empire mostly from Voronezh Governorate and Orel Governorate joined them. They were followed by more peasants from Poltava Governorate, Kharkov Governorate, and Saratov Governorate. The language used by settlers was a mixture of Russian language and Ukrainian language.

The Ukrainian politician and former boxing champion of the world Vitali Klitschko was born in Belovodskoye.
