= Jayyl District =

Coordinates: 42°49′N 73°51′E

Jayyl Жайыл району (Kyrgyz)
- District
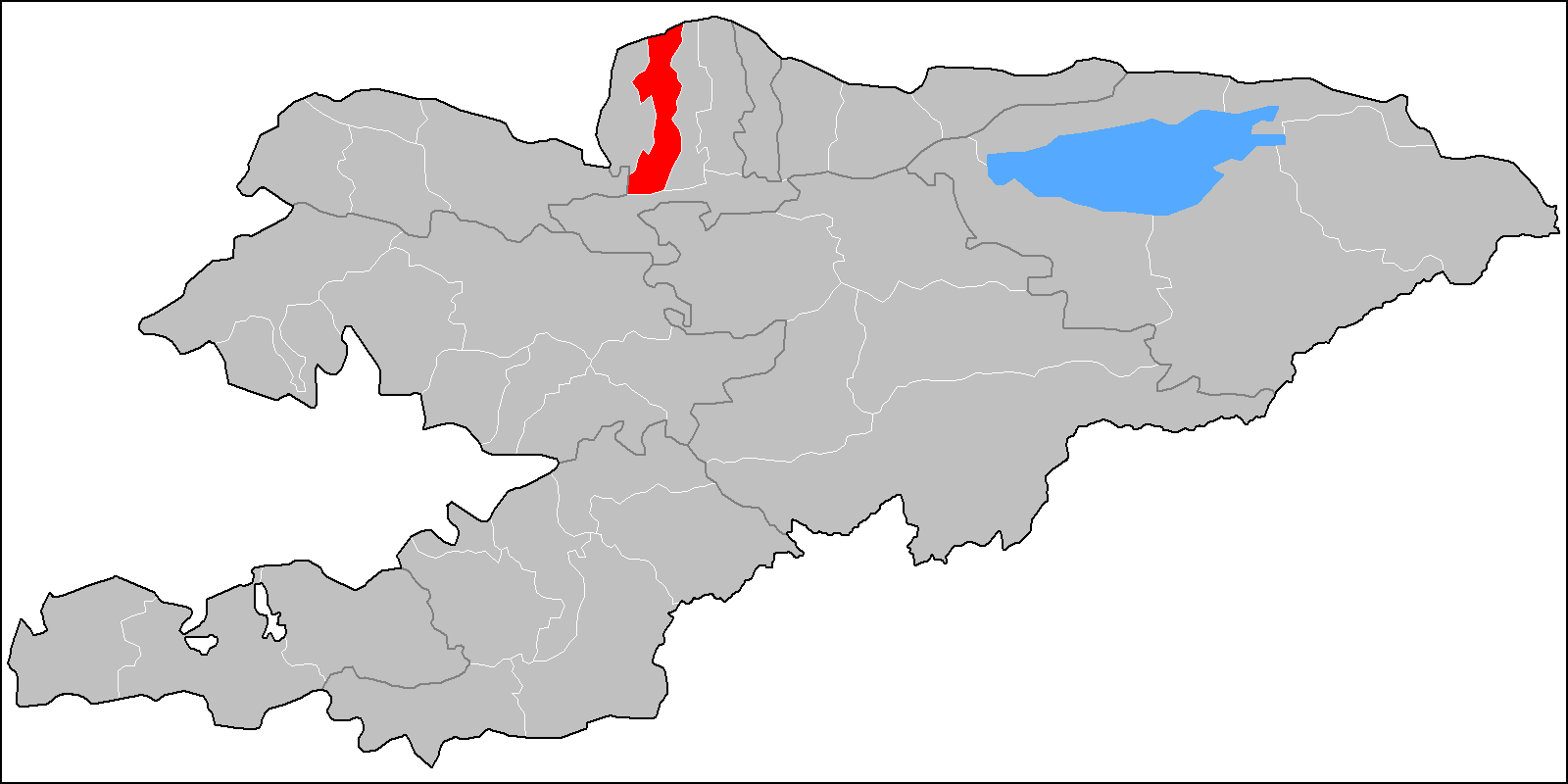
- Country: Kyrgyzstan
- Region: Chüy Region

Area
  - Total: 3,435 km^{2} (1,326 sq mi)

Population (2021)
  - Total: 112,211
  - Density: 32.67/km^{2} (84.61/sq mi)
- Time zone: UTC+6
- Website: http://www.jaiyl.kg/

Jaiyl District (Kyrgyz: Жайыл району, romanized: Jaiyl raionu), formerly called Kalinin District until May 1993, is a district of Chüy Region in northern Kyrgyzstan. Its area is 3,453 square kilometres (1,333 sq mi), and its resident population was 112,211 in 2021. The administrative seat lies at Kara-Balta. It also administers an exclave in the southwestern heel of Chüy Region (the Suusamyr Valley, not on map at right), separated from the rest of the Jayyl District by the Panfilov District.

== Demographics ==
=== Historical population ===
The resident population of Jayyl District declined from 108,834 in 1989 to 92,645 in 2009, before increasing to 114,852 at the 2022 census.

Historical population
| Year | Pop. | ±% p.a. |
|---|---|---|
| 1970 | 89,647 | — |
| 1979 | 96,025 | +0.77% |
| 1989 | 108,834 | +1.26% |
| 1999 | 100,307 | −0.81% |
| 2009 | 92,645 | −0.79% |
| 2021 | 112,211 | +1.61% |
| 2022 | 114,852 | +2.35% |
Resident population; 1970–2009 and 2022 census figures. The 2021 figure is a population estimate.

=== 2009 and 2022 censuses ===
According to the 2009 and 2022 censuses, the resident (de jure) population of Jayyl District increased by 22,207 people, or 24.0%. The urban population increased from 37,834 to 52,499, while the rural population increased from 54,811 to 62,353.

Population by sex and place of residence
| Population | 2009 | 2022 |
|---|---|---|
| Total | 92,645 | 114,852 |
| Male | 44,059 | 56,184 |
| Female | 48,586 | 58,668 |
| Urban | 37,834 | 52,499 |
| Rural | 54,811 | 62,353 |

=== Ethnic composition ===
The ethnic composition of Jayyl District changed between the 2009 and 2022 censuses. The proportion of ethnic Kyrgyz increased from 61.0% to 76.2%, while that of ethnic Russians decreased from 24.9% to 16.2%.

Ethnic composition of Jayyl District
| Ethnic group | 2009 | | 2022 | |
| Ethnic group | Population | % | Population | % |
|---|---|---|---|---|
| Kyrgyz | 56,542 | 61.0 | 87,524 | 76.2 |
| Russians | 23,100 | 24.9 | 18,612 | 16.2 |
| Ukrainians | 2,441 | 2.6 | 369 | 0.3 |
| Uyghurs | 1,646 | 1.8 | 887 | 0.8 |
| Uzbeks | 1,602 | 1.7 | 2,232 | 1.9 |
| Kazakhs | 1,409 | 1.5 | 1,273 | 1.1 |
| Azerbaijanis | 1,208 | 1.3 | 892 | 0.8 |
| Koreans | 1,164 | 1.3 | 426 | 0.4 |
| Tatars | 781 | 0.8 | 353 | 0.3 |
| Germans | 666 | 0.7 | 133 | 0.1 |
| Tajiks | 518 | 0.6 | 1,067 | 0.9 |
| Turks | 440 | 0.5 | 468 | 0.4 |
| Dungans | 223 | 0.2 | 152 | 0.1 |
| Others | 905 | 1.0 | 464 | 0.4 |
| Total | 92,645 | 100.0 | 114,852 | 100.0 |

Note: The 2009 "Others" category combines 113 Kurds, 111 Chechens and 681 people of other ethnic groups, which are not separately listed in the 2022 district table. Percentages are rounded and may not sum exactly to 100%.

== Populated places ==
In total, Jayyl District include 1 town and 36 settlements in 12 rural communities (ayyl aymagy). Each rural community can consist of one or several villages. The rural communities and settlements in the Jayyl District are:

1. town Kara-Balta (town of district significance)
2. Ak-Bashat (seat: Novonikolayevka; incl. Aydarbek, Ak-Bashat and Aral)
3. Jayyl (seat: Alekseyevka; incl. Jayyl)
4. Kara-Suu (seat: Stavropolovka; incl. Kara-Suu)
5. Krasnovostochny (seat: Kalinin; incl. Kaldyk and Kara-Döbö)
6. Kyzyl-Dyykan (seat: Petropavlovka; incl. Kyzyl-Dyykan)
7. Poltavka (seat: Poltavka; incl. Orto-Suu and Mal-Tabar)
8. Sary-Bulak (seat: Sary-Bulak; incl. Mongoldor)
9. Sary-Koo (seat: Eriktuu; incl. Altyn, Jeken, Jon-Aryk, Iyri-Suu and Fedorovka)
10. Sosnovka (seat: Sosnovka)
11. Stepnoye (seat: Stepnoye)
12. Suusamyr (seat: Suusamyr; incl. Kaysar, Birinchi May, Tunuk, Kojomkul, Karakol and Kyzyl-Oy)
13. Taldy-Bulak (seat: Böksö-Jol; incl. Kayyrma and Bekitay)
Settlements of the Jayyl District, northern part
Settlements of the Jayyl District, Suusamyr villages' community
