= Ysyk-Ata Resort =

Coordinates: 42.8178°N 74.9285°E

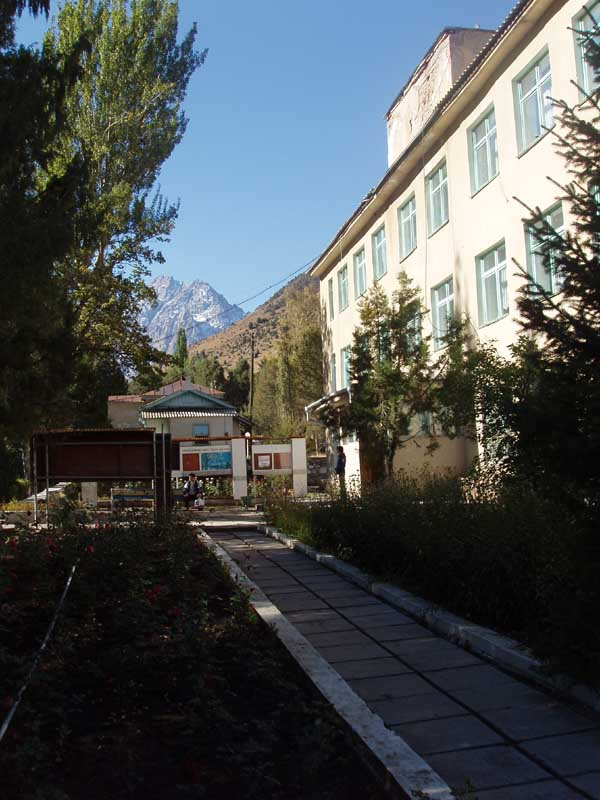
Hospital building at the resort.

Ysyk-Ata Resort (Kyrgyz: Ысык-Ата курорту) is a balneoclimatic resort located at the north slope of Kyrgyz Ala-Too Range, at the altitude of 1,775 m (5,823 ft) above sea level. The resort features a relief of a Tibetan medicinal Buddha and Tibetan inscriptions dated from the eighth to tenth century CE, with a much later carving of Lenin added to the side.
