= European route E010 =

Road in trans-European E-road network

E010

Route information
- Length: 685 km (426 mi)

Major junctions
- From: Bishkek
- To: Osh

Location
- Countries: Kyrgyzstan

Highway system
- International E-road network; A Class; B Class

E 010, commonly known as the Bishkek-Osh Road, is a European B class road in Kyrgyzstan, connecting the cities Bishkek and Osh.

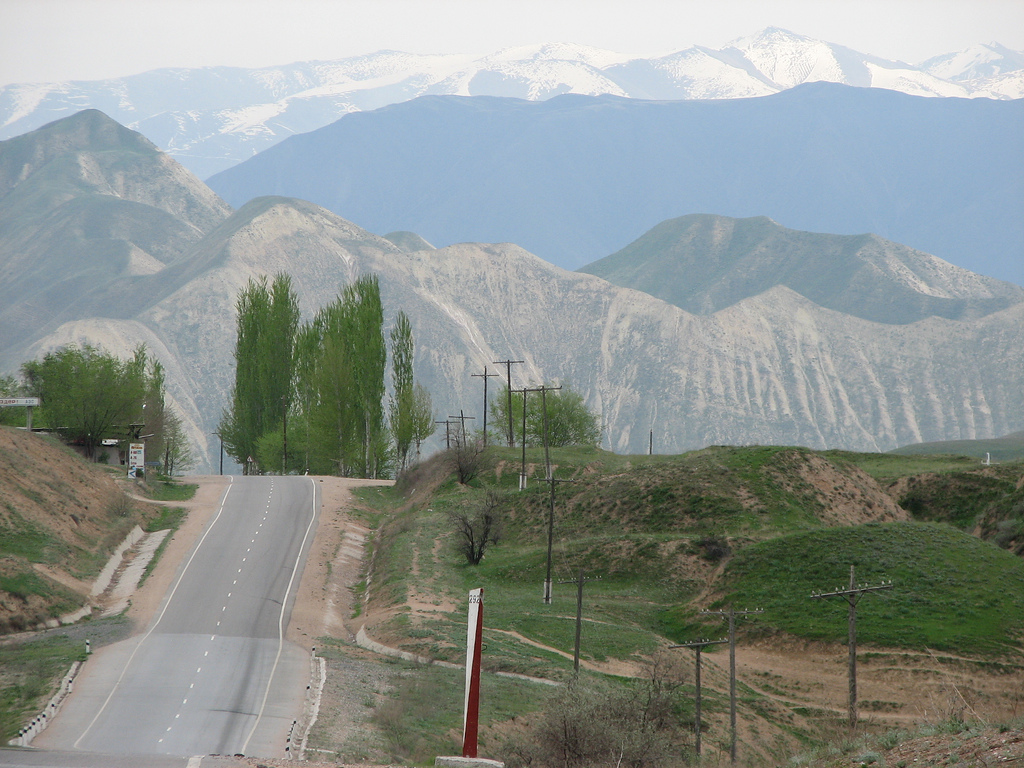
Bishkek-Osh road

== Route ==
- Kyrgyzstan
  - ЭМ-04 ЭМ-04 Road: Bishkek - Kara-Balta - Jalal-Abad - Osh
