= Kara-Balta =

Kara-Balta Кара-Балта
- Flag Seal

- Location in Kyrgyzstan
- Coordinates: 42°50′N 73°51′E
- Country: Kyrgyzstan
- Region: Chüy Region
- District: Jayyl District
- Elevation: 789 m (2,588 ft)

Population (2021)
  - Total: 48,278
- Time zone: UTC+6
- Website: www.kara-balta.kg

Kara-Balta (/ˌkærəˈbɔːltə/; Dungan, Russian and Kyrgyz: Кара-Балта; lit. 'Black Ax') is a city and municipality on the Kara-Balta River, in Chüy Region, in northern Kyrgyzstan, the capital of Jayyl District. Its population was 48,278 in 2021.

Kara-Balta is located on the northern slopes of the Kyrgyz Ala-Too, in the western part of Chüy Region, 62 km (39 mi) west of the capital of Bishkek. The road continues west through Kaindy toward Taraz, Kazakhstan. Another road goes south through the Töö-Ashuu Pass and then splits, one branch going west to Talas Province and the other south and then east through the Suusamyr valley to Balykchy on Lake Issyk Kul. It has a temperate climate. The terrain is flat, with a slight slope downwards from the south to the north. As one drives from Bishkek and enters Kara-Balta by the main road, a large monument of Jayil Baatir - one of the city's main attractions - greets the driver on the right-hand side.

== History ==
The Chüy Valley has been settled since the 5th century, but after an invasion by Genghis Khan the area was inhabited mostly by nomads and pastoralists. However, the settlement became a town and flourished under the Khanate of Kokand. It was founded in 1825 under the Khanate of Kokand, and received city status in 1975 under the Soviets.

During World War II, in 1942, the automobile battalions of the Polish Anders' Army were stationed and organized in Kara-Balta, before their evacuation from Kyrgyzstan to fight against Nazi Germany.

== Population ==
Historical population
Year	Pop.	±% p.a.
1970	24,730	—
1979	46,970	+7.39%
1989	53,887	+1.38%
1999	47,159	−1.32%
2009	37,834	−2.18%
2021	48,278	+2.05%
Note: resident population; Sources:

== Geography ==
=== Climate ===
Kara-Balta has a hot, dry-summer continental climate (Köppen climate classification Dsa). The average annual temperature is 9.7 °C (49.5 °F). The warmest month is July with an average temperature of 23.3 °C (73.9 °F) and the coolest month is January with an average temperature of -4.8 °C (23.4 °F). The average annual precipitation is 414.1mm (16.3") and has an average of 99.2 days with precipitation. The wettest month is April with an average of 60.9mm (2.4") of precipitation and the driest month is August with an average of 12.2mm (0.5") of precipitation.

Climate data for Kara-Balta
Month	Jan	Feb	Mar	Apr	May	Jun	Jul	Aug	Sep	Oct	Nov	Dec	Year
Daily mean °C (°F)	−4.8 (23.4)	−3.6 (25.5)	3.6 (38.5)	11.4 (52.5)	16.2 (61.2)	20.8 (69.4)	23.3 (73.9)	21.6 (70.9)	16.5 (61.7)	9.7 (49.5)	3.2 (37.8)	−1.8 (28.8)	9.7 (49.5)
Average precipitation mm (inches)	25.9 (1.02)	28.7 (1.13)	47.9 (1.89)	60.9 (2.40)	58.2 (2.29)	37.5 (1.48)	19.8 (0.78)	12.2 (0.48)	12.5 (0.49)	37 (1.5)	39.2 (1.54)	34.3 (1.35)	414.1 (16.30)
Average precipitation days (≥ 0.1 mm)	9.1	9	11.3	11.1	11	8.5	6.2	4.5	4.1	7.1	8.8	8.5	99.2
Average relative humidity (%)	74.3	75.6	69.4	57.4	53.8	46.1	44.2	45.2	47.8	57.5	68	75.8	59.6
Source: "The Climate of Kara-Balta". Weatherbase.

== Economy ==
The major industry in Kara-Balta was the processing plant of the mining combine, Kara-Balta Ore Mining Combine (KBMP), the largest in Central Asia. During Soviet times, it processed uranium ore from deposits in Kyrgyzstan and Kazakhstan. After independence, the mines in Kyrgyzstan closed quickly;however, KBMP continued to process uranium concentrate from Kazakhstan until 2005 when this activity was stopped due to a lack of raw material. The massive uranium tailings remain a problem. KBMP still processes gold and molybdenum ores.

In February 2007, the Russian Renova Group won a tender to purchase the Kyrgyz government's 72.28% stake in the Kara-Balta uranium-production facility.

== Transport ==
=== Highways ===
Kara-Balta is located along M41 on the route from Bishkek to Osh. It is also connected by highway to Taraz, Kazakhstan.

=== Rail ===
Kara-Balta is connected by rail to Bishkek, Kyrgyzstan and Taraz, Kazakhstan.

== Sports ==
During the Soviet period, the city had a good sport infrastructure.

The city has a bandy club. There is a football club Kara-Balta founded in 1952 that plays in Kyrgyzstan's premier league.

== Military ==
In the city the Russian military has a capacity.
