= Ysyk-Ata District =

District in Chüy Region, Kyrgyzstan

Ysyk-Ata Ысык-Ата району
- District
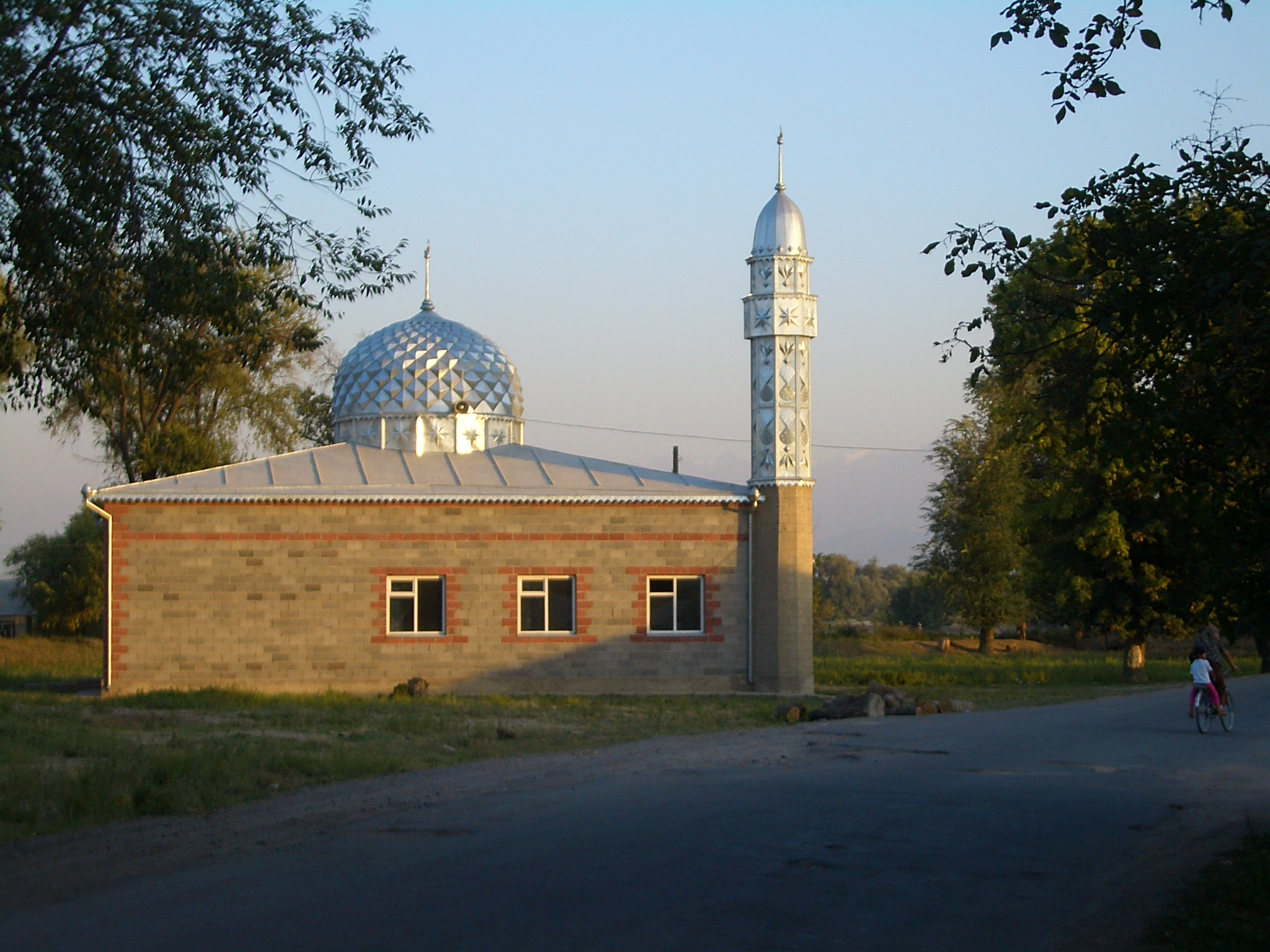
- Mosque in Pervomayskoe village

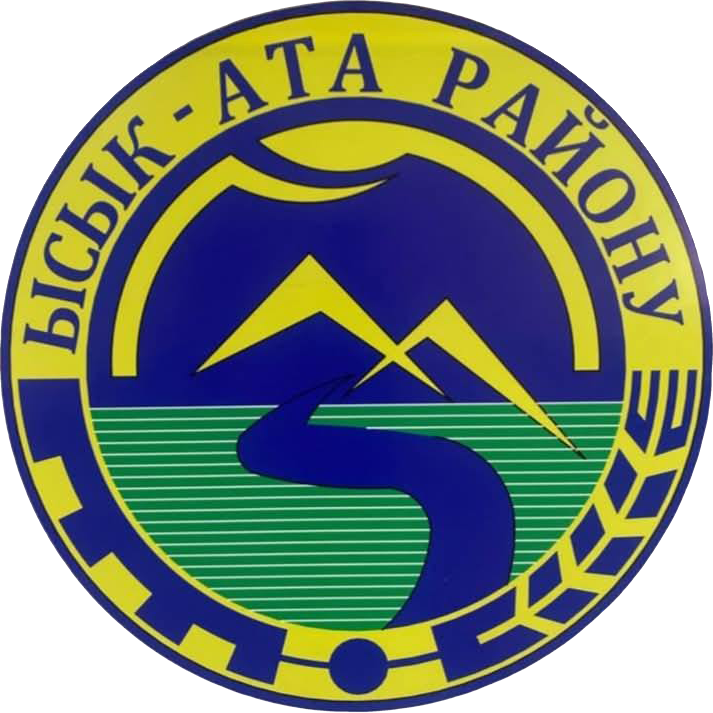
- Coat of arms

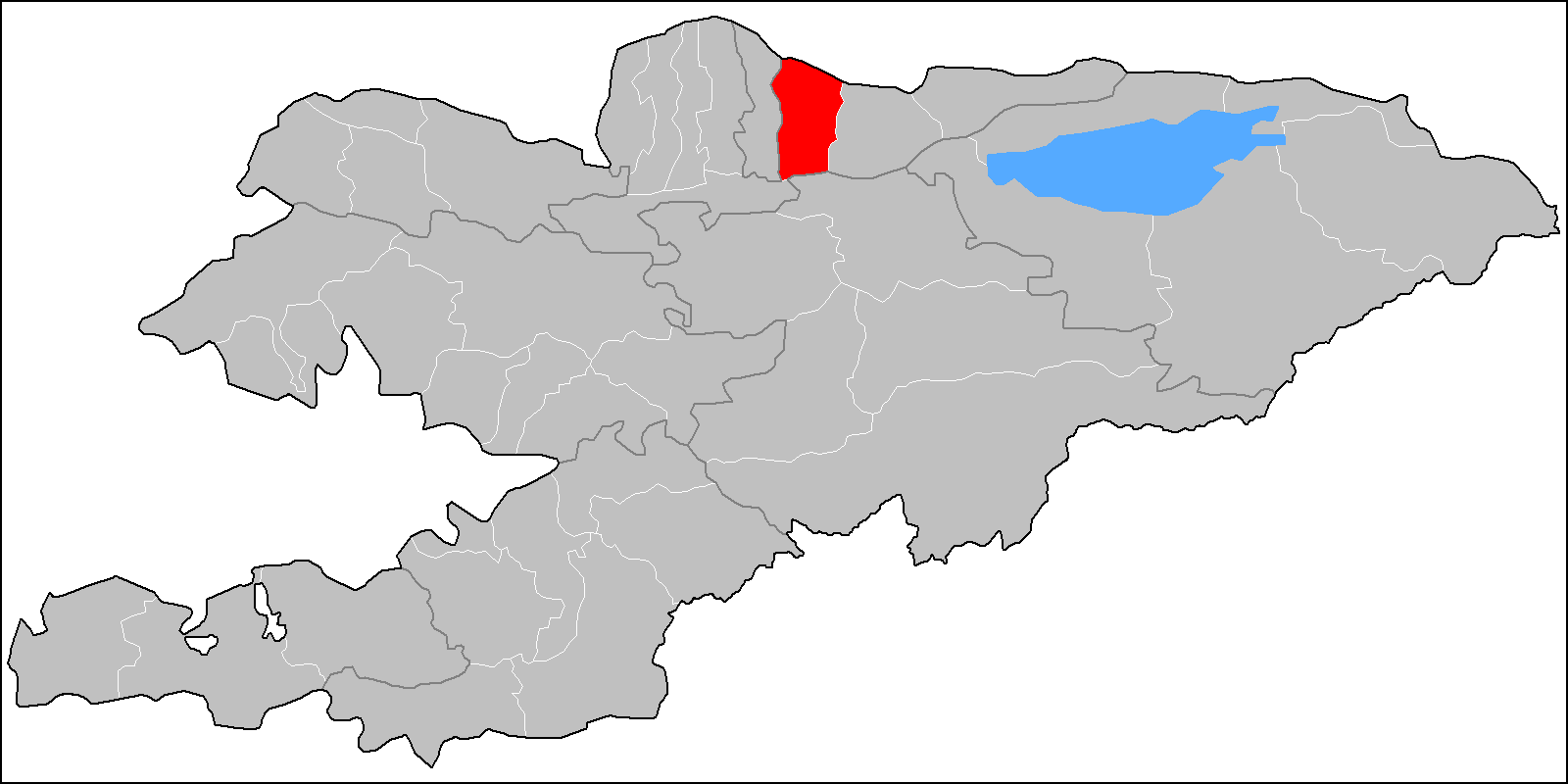
- Location of Ysyk-Ata District in Kyrgyzstan
- Coordinates: 42°53′N 74°51′E
- Country: Kyrgyzstan
- Region: Chüy Region
- Established: 19 April 1977
- Administrative centre: Kant

Area
  - Total: 2,415 km^{2} (932 sq mi)

Population (2022)
  - Total: 156,816
  - Density: 64.93/km^{2} (168.2/sq mi)
- Time zone: UTC+6

Ysyk-Ata District (Kyrgyz: Ысык-Ата району; Russian: Ысык-Атинский район) is one of the eight districts of Chüy Region in northern Kyrgyzstan. It covers an area of 2,415 square kilometres (932 sq mi), extending from the Chüy Valley in the north to the northern slopes of the Kyrgyz Ala-Too Range in the south. Its administrative centre is the city of Kant. Established in 1977, the district was merged with the former Kant District in 1998. Its resident population was 156,816 at the 2022 census.

== History ==
Ysyk-Ata District was established on 19 April 1977, with Ivanovka as its administrative centre. On 30 September 1998, it was merged with Kant District under Law No. 128 of the Kyrgyz Republic. The enlarged district retained the name Ysyk-Ata, and its administrative centre was transferred to Kant.

=== Military aviation ===
A Soviet military aviation school was relocated to the Kant area during World War II. During the war, the school trained 1,507 military pilots. From 1956, it also trained foreign pilots, including future Egyptian president Hosni Mubarak and Syrian president Hafez al-Assad.

Following the dissolution of the Soviet Union, control of the air base was transferred to Kyrgyzstan in 1992. Since 2003, the base has hosted Russian military aviation units.

== Geography ==
Ysyk-Ata District is situated in the central part of the Chüy Valley, east of Bishkek. It extends approximately 65 km from north to south and 44 km from west to east. The district borders Kazakhstan to the north, Kochkor District of Naryn Region to the south, Alamüdün District to the west, and Chüy District to the east.

The northern part of the district occupies the Chüy Valley, while the southern part extends into the foothills and northern slopes of the Kyrgyz Ala-Too Range. Much of the terrain consists of plains and foothills, with mountainous areas rising to elevations of 1,000–2,000 m and higher. Mountain pastures are used for livestock grazing, while the foothills are cultivated.

The Ysyk-Ata Gorge, on the northern slopes of the Kyrgyz Ala-Too, extends for approximately 50 km. Its upper reaches rise to about 4,500 m above sea level, while its lower section lies at approximately 1,000 m. The gorge contains thermal mineral springs associated with the Ysyk-Ata Resort. The district also has deposits of polymetallic ores, construction materials, and rock salt.

The upper reaches of the Ysyk-Ata River contain the Eastern and Western Ysyk-Ata glaciers. According to the 1994 Chüy Region Encyclopedia, the Eastern Ysyk-Ata Glacier was 3.8 km long and covered 4.8 km², while the Western Ysyk-Ata Glacier was 3.0 km long and covered 3.6 km².

=== Climate ===
The climate is continental, with average January temperatures ranging from −10 to −6 °C and July temperatures from 18 to 20 °C. Annual precipitation ranges from 300 to 600 mm.

=== Rivers ===
The district lies within the drainage basin of the Chu River. Its principal rivers include the Ysyk-Ata, Kyzyl-Suu, and Norus.

Bank erosion along the left (southern) bank of the Chu River affects parts of Ysyk-Ata District, threatening agricultural land and infrastructure. In 2026, the Ministry of Emergency Situations included a 500 m section of the district's riverbank in its bank protection programme.

=== Soils and vegetation ===
The district's soils consist mainly of grey soils, dark chestnut soils, and chernozems. Most of the lowland areas have been converted to agricultural land. Vegetation on the mountain slopes includes mountain meadows, shrubs, and juniper woodlands. The 1994 encyclopedia also describes open woodlands and blackcurrant bushes in the mountainous areas.

== Demographics ==
=== Historical population ===
The resident population of Ysyk-Ata District declined from 127,512 in 1989 to 124,983 in 1999, before increasing to 132,759 in 2009 and 156,816 at the 2022 census.

Historical population
Year	Pop.	±% p.a.
1970	99,706	—
1979	109,975	+1.10%
1989	127,512	+1.49%
1999	124,983	−0.20%
2009	132,759	+0.61%
2021	154,340	+1.26%
2022	156,816	+1.60%
Resident population; 1970–2009 and 2022 census figures. The 2021 figure is a population estimate.

=== 2009 and 2022 censuses ===
According to the 2009 and 2022 population censuses, the resident (de jure) population of Ysyk-Ata District increased by 24,057 people, or 18.1%. The urban population increased from 21,589 to 23,249, while the rural population increased from 111,170 to 133,567.

Population by sex and place of residence
Population	2009	2022
Total	132,759	156,816
Male	65,278	77,764
Female	67,481	79,052
Urban	21,589	23,249
Rural	111,170	133,567

=== Ethnic composition ===
The ethnic composition of Ysyk-Ata District changed between the 2009 and 2022 censuses. The proportion of ethnic Kyrgyz increased from 47.2% to 57.4%, while that of ethnic Russians decreased from 21.1% to 14.8%. The proportion of Dungans increased slightly, from 14.5% to 15.3%.

Ethnic composition of Ysyk-Ata District
Ethnic group	2009		2022	
Ethnic group	Population	%	Population	%
Kyrgyz	62,620	47.2	90,020	57.4
Russians	28,000	21.1	23,131	14.8
Dungans	19,223	14.5	23,975	15.3
Turks	4,699	3.5	2,454	1.6
Uyghurs	4,091	3.1	3,854	2.5
Azerbaijanis	3,486	2.6	4,589	2.9
Uzbeks	2,207	1.7	2,541	1.6
Germans	1,524	1.1	609	0.4
Ukrainians	1,343	1.0	316	0.2
Kazakhs	1,317	1.0	1,255	0.8
Tatars	1,078	0.8	674	0.4
Balkars	611	0.5	545	0.3
Koreans	588	0.4	188	0.1
Tajiks	383	0.3	898	0.6
Kurds	349	0.3	308	0.2
Karachays	182	0.1	113	0.1
Others	1,058	0.8	1,346	0.9
Total	132,759	100.0	156,816	100.0

Note: "Others" includes smaller ethnic groups combined for comparison. Percentages are calculated from population counts and rounded to one decimal place.

== Notable people ==
- Kakish Ryskulova – the first Central Asian woman to become a surgeon.
