= Uzun-Akmat =

Coordinates: 41°52′N 72°41′E

- Native name: Kyrgyz: Узун-Акмат

Location
- Country: Kyrgyzstan
- Region: Jalal-Abad Region
- District: Toktogul District,

Physical characteristics
- Source: Springs on the northern slopes of the Talas Alatau
- Mouth: Toktogul Reservoir
- Length: 90 km (56 mi)
- Basin size: 2,210 km^{2} (850 mi^{2})
- Discharge
  - average: 29.5 m^{3}/s (1,040 cu ft/s)

Basin features
- Progression: Toktogul Reservoir → Naryn River → Syr Darya → Aral Sea
- Main tributaries: Right: Karakulja, Ustasai; Left: Karaküngöy, Beshtash, Tereksai

The Uzun-Akmat (Kyrgyz: Узун-Акмат) or (Kyrgyz: Узунакмат) is a river in the Ketmen-Töbö Valley of the Jalal-Abad Region, Kyrgyzstan. It originates from springs on the northern slopes of the Talas Alatau and flows into the Toktogul Reservoir. The river is an important watercourse of western Kyrgyzstan and is widely used for irrigation.

== Geography ==
The Uzunakmat rises from numerous springs on the northern flank of the Talas Alatau. In its upper reaches, the river flows through a narrow valley with steep slopes. Downstream, the valley gradually widens, forming a broader floodplain before the river enters the Toktogul Reservoir.

Several rural settlements are located along its banks, including Kara-Künggöy, Chong-Aryk, Ak-Tektir, and others.

== Hydrology ==
The Uzunakmat River is 90 km (56 mi) long and drains a basin of 2,210 km^{2} (850 mi^{2}). The long-term average discharge measured near the confluence with the Ustasai River is approximately 29.5 m^{3}/s (1,040 cu ft/s).

The highest discharge occurs in June, reaching up to 129 m^{3}/s (4,600 cu ft/s), while the lowest flow is observed in March, at about 3.8 m^{3}/s (130 cu ft/s). The river begins to rise in April and recedes in September. Its flow is mainly fed by snowmelt, springs, and rainfall.

== Tributaries ==
Major tributaries of the Uzunakmat include:

- Right: Karakulja, Ustasai
- Left: Karaküngöy, Beshtash, Tereksai

== Use ==
The Uzunakmat is primarily used for irrigation.

== See also ==
- List of rivers of Kyrgyzstan
- Naryn River
- Toktogul Reservoir
