= Chychkan =

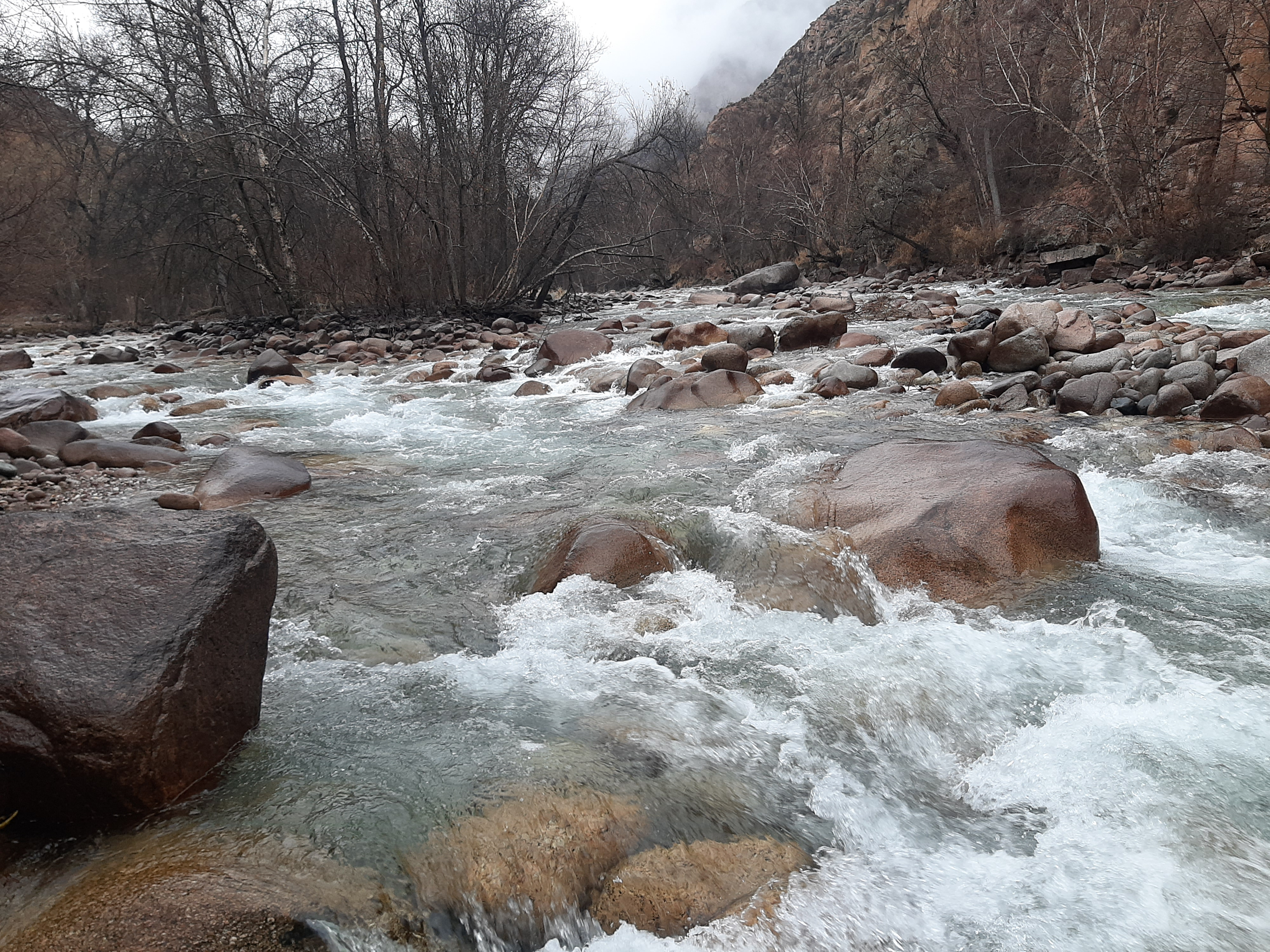
- Native name: Чычкан (Kyrgyz)

Location
- Country: Kyrgyzstan
- Region: Jalal-Abad
- District: Toktogul District

Physical characteristics
- Source
  - location: Tüz-Ashuu (pass), southern slope of the Talas Ala-Too Range
  - coordinates: 42°17′17″N 72°57′03″E
  - elevation: 3,446 m (11,306 ft)
- Mouth: Toktogul Reservoir
  - location: near Toktogul
  - coordinates: 41°51′13″N 72°53′29″E
  - elevation: 871 m (2,858 ft)
- Length: 78 km (48 mi)
- Basin size: 1,290 km²
- Discharge
  - average: 19 m³/s
  - minimum: 0.80 m³/s (March)
  - maximum: 72.7 m³/s (June)

Chychkan (Kyrgyz: Чычкан) is a river in Kyrgyzstan. It rises from small springs near the Tüz-Ashuu Pass on the southern slope of the Talas Ala-Too Range, where its upper course is known as Tuyuktor. The river traverses the Ketmen-Töbö Valley and discharges into the Toktogul Reservoir near the town of Toktogul.

== Course ==
In its upper reaches, the river flows through a wide valley, while in the middle and lower sections it passes through a narrow gorge. The valley is forested and considered one of the most scenic areas in Kyrgyzstan.

== Hydrology ==
- Length: 78 km
- Basin area: 1,290 km²
- Average annual discharge: 19 m³/s
- Maximum discharge: June (72.7 m³/s)
- Minimum discharge: March (0.80 m³/s)

The river experiences seasonal variation, with water levels rising in April due to snowmelt and declining by September.

== Tributaries ==
Right bank:

- Itagar
- Arym

Left bank:

- Bala-Chychkan
- Terisay

== Valley and Environment ==
The Chychkan Valley is characterized by forested landscapes and diverse natural features. It is regarded as one of the most picturesque regions in Kyrgyzstan. Hydrometeorological and avalanche monitoring stations have been established in the valley.

== Settlements ==
Near its mouth, the river flows close to the town of Toktogul.

== Economic Use ==
The river is used for irrigation and supports local agriculture.

== See also ==
- Toktogul Reservoir
- Talas Ala-Too Range
- Kyrgyzstan
