= Akchii =

Akchii may refer to:

- Akchikarasu, a village in the Jalal-Abad Province of Kyrgyzstan
- Akchi, Pavlodar Province, Kazakhstan
