= Ak-Chiy =

Ak-Chiy may refer to:

- Akchikarasu in Kyrgyzstan
- Akchi in Kazakhstan
