= Almalu =

Almalu (Persian: المالو) or (Kyrgyz: Алмалуу) may refer to:

== Iran ==
- Almalu, Ajab Shir, a village in Ajab Shir County, East Azerbaijan province
- Almalu, Bostanabad, a village in Bostanabad County, East Azerbaijan province
- Almalu Rural District, an administrative division in East Azerbaijan province
- Almalu, West Azerbaijan, a village in Khoy County, West Azerbaijan province
- Almalu, Mahneshan, a village in Mahneshan County, Zanjan province
- Almalu, Zanjan, a village in Zanjan County, Zanjan province

== Kyrgyzstan ==
- Almaluu, Kemin, a village in Chüy Region
- Almaluu, a village in Jalal-Abad Region
