= Afaq Khoja Mausoleum =

Holiest Muslim site in Xinjiang, China

Coordinates: 39°29′26″N 76°01′23″E

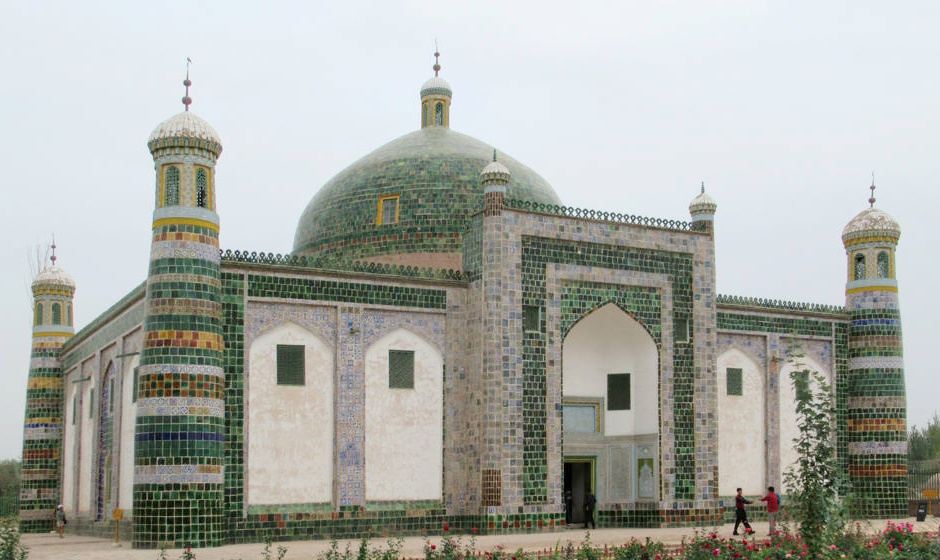

Uyghur name
- Uyghur: ئاپاق خوجا مازار
Transcriptions
- Latin Yëziqi: Apaq Xoja Mazar

Chinese name
- Chinese: 阿巴和加麻札
Transcriptions
Standard Mandarin
- Hanyu Pinyin: Ābā Héjiā mázhá

Persian name
- Persian: مزار آفاق خواجه

The Afaq Khoja Mausoleum is a mausoleum in Xinjiang, China; it is the holiest Muslim site in the region. It is located some 5 km northeast from the centre of Kashgar, in Haohan Village (浩罕村; Ayziret in Uyghur), which is also known as Yaghdu. The shrine is visited by sightseers and has been designated as a tourist attraction by Chinese officials.

== History ==
The mazar (mausoleum) was initially built in ca. 1640 as the tomb of Muhammad Yūsuf, a Central Asian Naqshbandi Sufi master who had come to the Altishahr region (present-day Southern Xinjiang) in the early 17th century and possibly was also active in spreading Sufism in China proper. Later, Muhammad Yūsuf's more famous son and successor, Afāq Khoja, was buried there as well in 1694. As believed, the tiled mausoleum contains the tombs of five generations of the Afāqi family, providing resting places for 72 of its members.

== Description ==
The mausoleum is perhaps the finest example of Islamic architecture in Xinjiang. A large dome of 17 m is at the center surrounded by four corner minarets with stripes and arabesque floral patterns. Each of the windows of the minarets are in a different geometric pattern while the tops have turrets with an inverted lotus dome and scalloped edges. The entrance to the mausoleum features a large facade and a tiled iwan-niche style typical of Central Asian mosques.

The tombs are decorated with blue glazed tiles and draped in colorful silks. Inside the tomb hall is the Casket of Iparhan which supposedly carried her from Beijing.

There is a mausoleum, four prayer halls which are supported by wooden beams with muqarnas on the capitals, a lecture hall and a cemetery which is still in use by the Ugyhur population and has distinctive mud and brick tombs. A gateway also has blue glazed tiles and there is a pond in the courtyard for people to cleanse before entering.

== Gallery ==
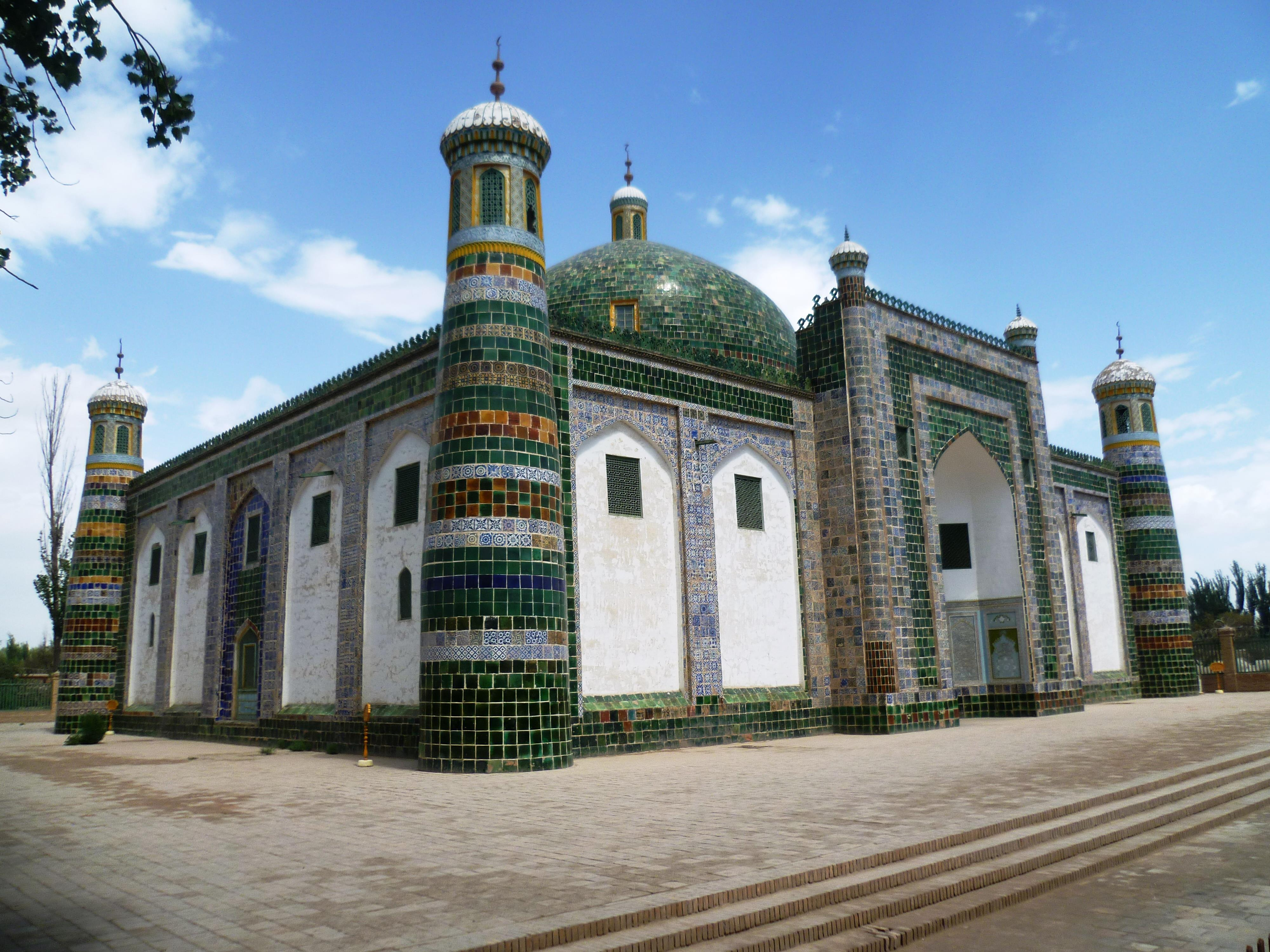
Closer view of the mausoleum

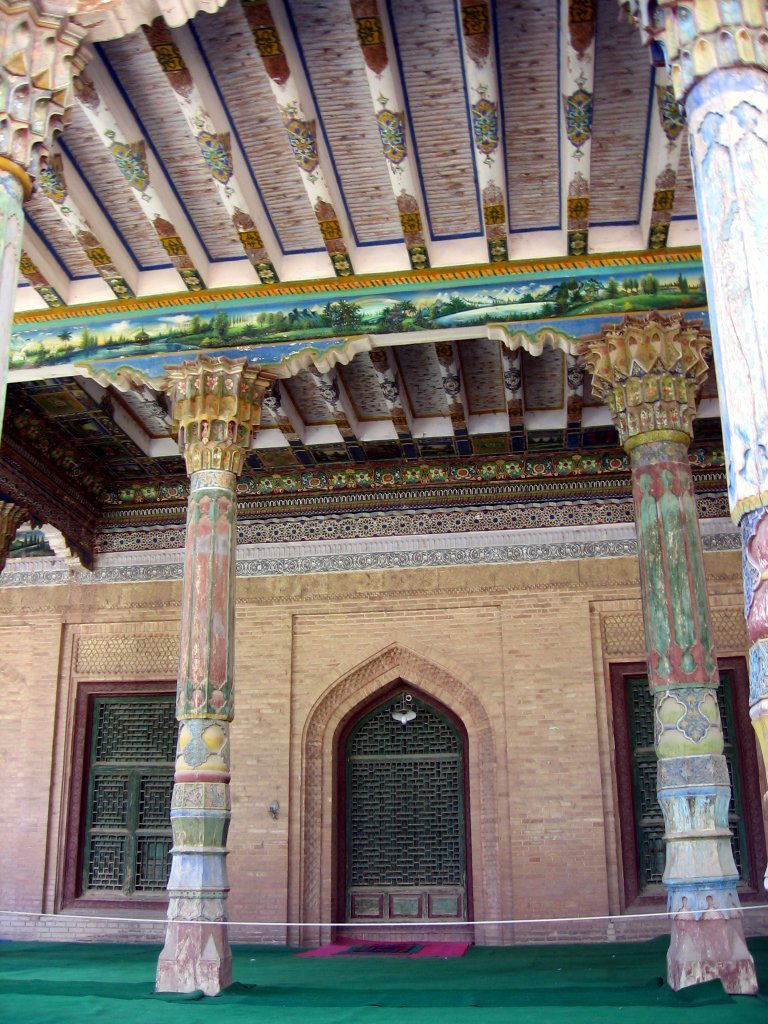
Entrance of the mausoleum

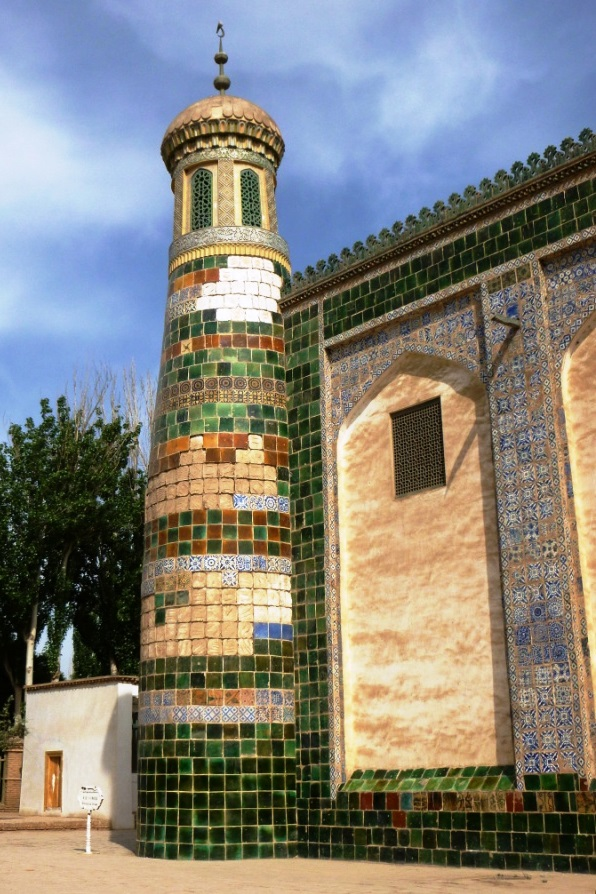
One of the mausoleum's tiled minarets

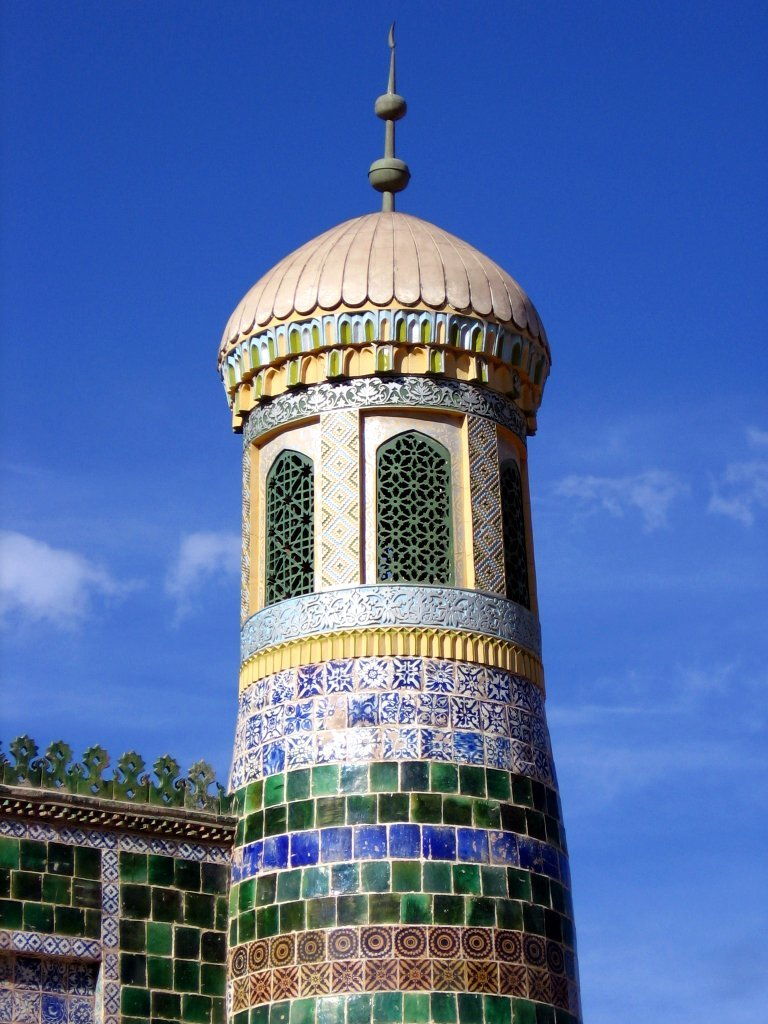
Detail of the tiled minaret

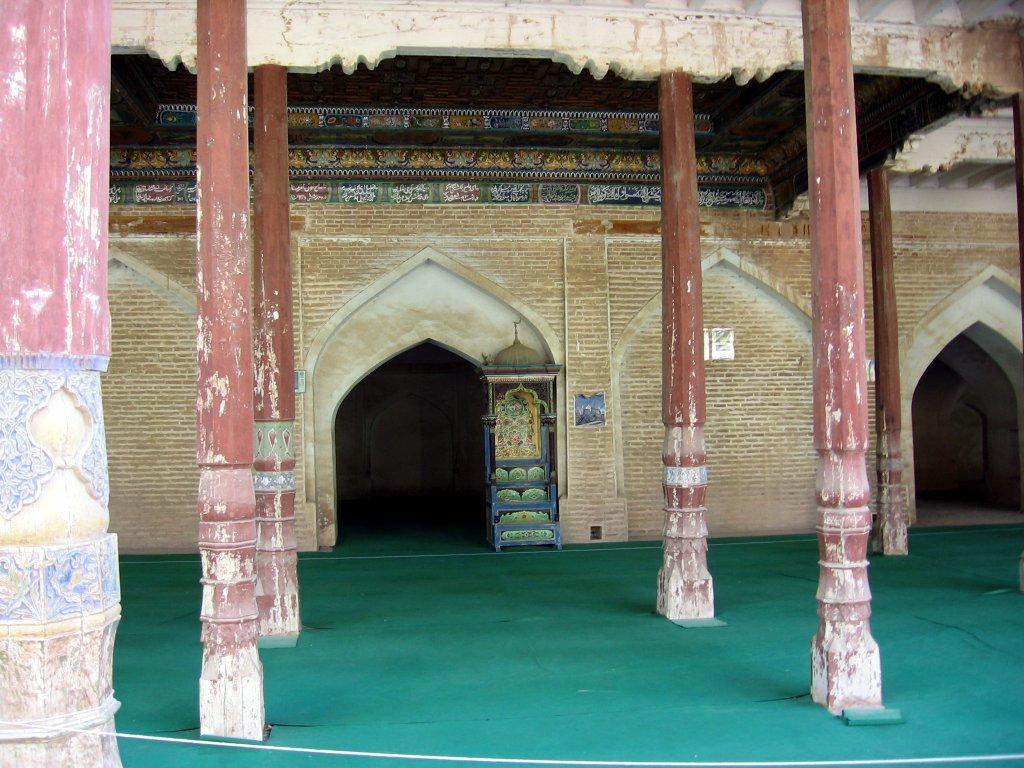
Wooden beams in the mausoleum's interior

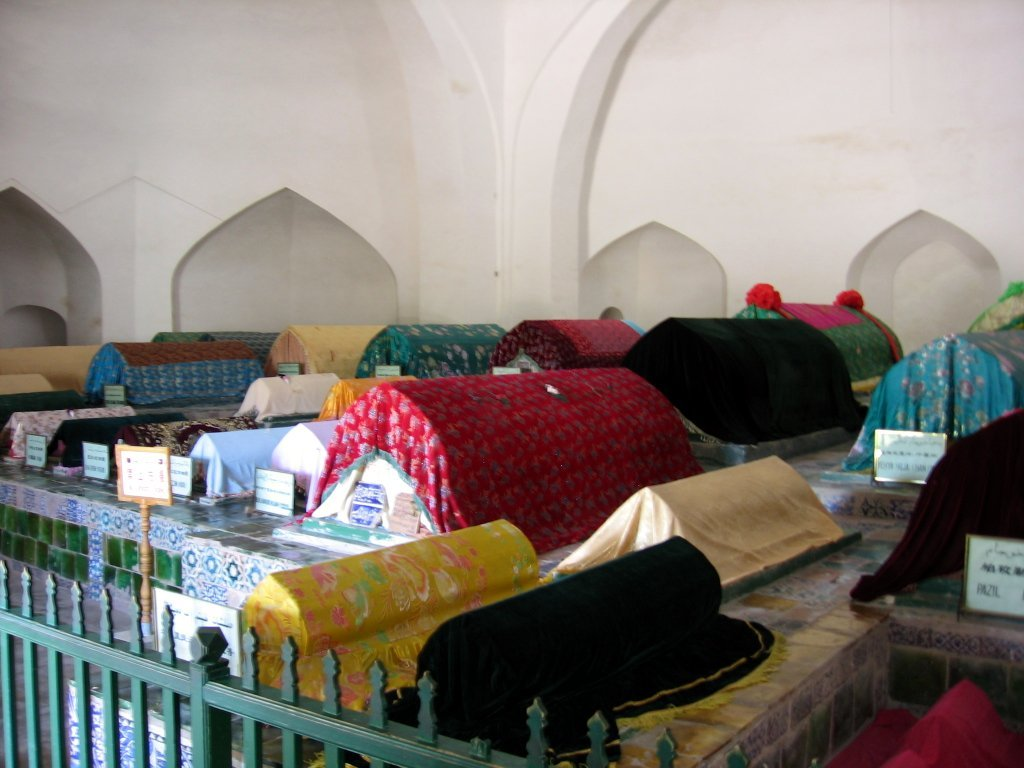
Tombs are decorated with blue glazed tiles and draped in colorful silks.

== Chinese tourism ==
In 2015, officials opened a tourist park named Xiang Fei Garden near the mausoleum. The shrine is visited by pilgrims and sightseers especially China's ethnic-Han majority, and has been designated as a tourist attraction by Chinese officials.
