= Vladimir Kornilov =

Vladimir Kornilov may refer to:

- Vladimir Alexeyevich Kornilov (1806–1854), Russian naval officer
- Vladimir Grigoryevich Kornilov (1923–2002), Russian Soviet writer, publicist and public figure
- Vladimir Kornilov (footballer)(1923–1983), Soviet footballer
