= Zinaida Krutikhovskaia =

Zinaida Aleksandrovna Krutikhovskaia
- Born: 16 October 1916; Kargopol, Kurgan Oblast, Russian Empire
- Died: 28 December 1986 (aged 70)
- Education: Sverdlovsk Mining Institute; Ukrainian Institute of Geophysics (Ph.D)
- Awards: State Prize of the Ukrainian S.S.R. (1972)
- Scientific career
- Fields: Geophysics
- Institutions: Institute of Geology; Institute of Geophysics of the Ukrainian Academy of Sciences; Kiev Geological Prospecting Technical Institute

Zinaida Krutikhovskaia (16 October 1916 – 28 December 1986) was a Soviet geophysicist who specialized in geomagnetism.

== Life and work ==
Zinaida Alexandrovna Krutikhovskaia was born on 16 October 1916 in the village of Kargopol in Kurgan Province in the Russian Empire. She graduated from the Sverdlovsk Mining Institute in 1938 and began working for the Institute of Geology prospecting for coal and iron ore in the Ural Mountains and Ukraine. In the latter area, she participated in the discovery of major iron ore deposits near Kremenchuk, Ukraine. Krutikhovskaia began working at the Institute of Geophysics of the Ukrainian Academy of Sciences and founded the magnetic prospecting laboratory there in 1961. She was the head of the laboratory until her retirement in 1981 and remained a consultant afterwards. She received her Ph.D. in 1981 from the Ukrainian Institute of Geophysics.

Krutikhovskaia wrote nine monographs and over 160 published articles in her career. She also supervised graduate students at the Kiev Geological Prospecting Technical Institute for a decade. In 1972, she was awarded the State Prize of the Ukrainian S.S.R. "for her work on the development and introduction of a procedure for geologic mapping, prospecting, and study of the structure of the deep-seated deposits of the Ukrainian iron ore province."
