= Toktogul District =

Coordinates: 41.869711°N 72.945194°E

Toktogul Токтогул району
- District
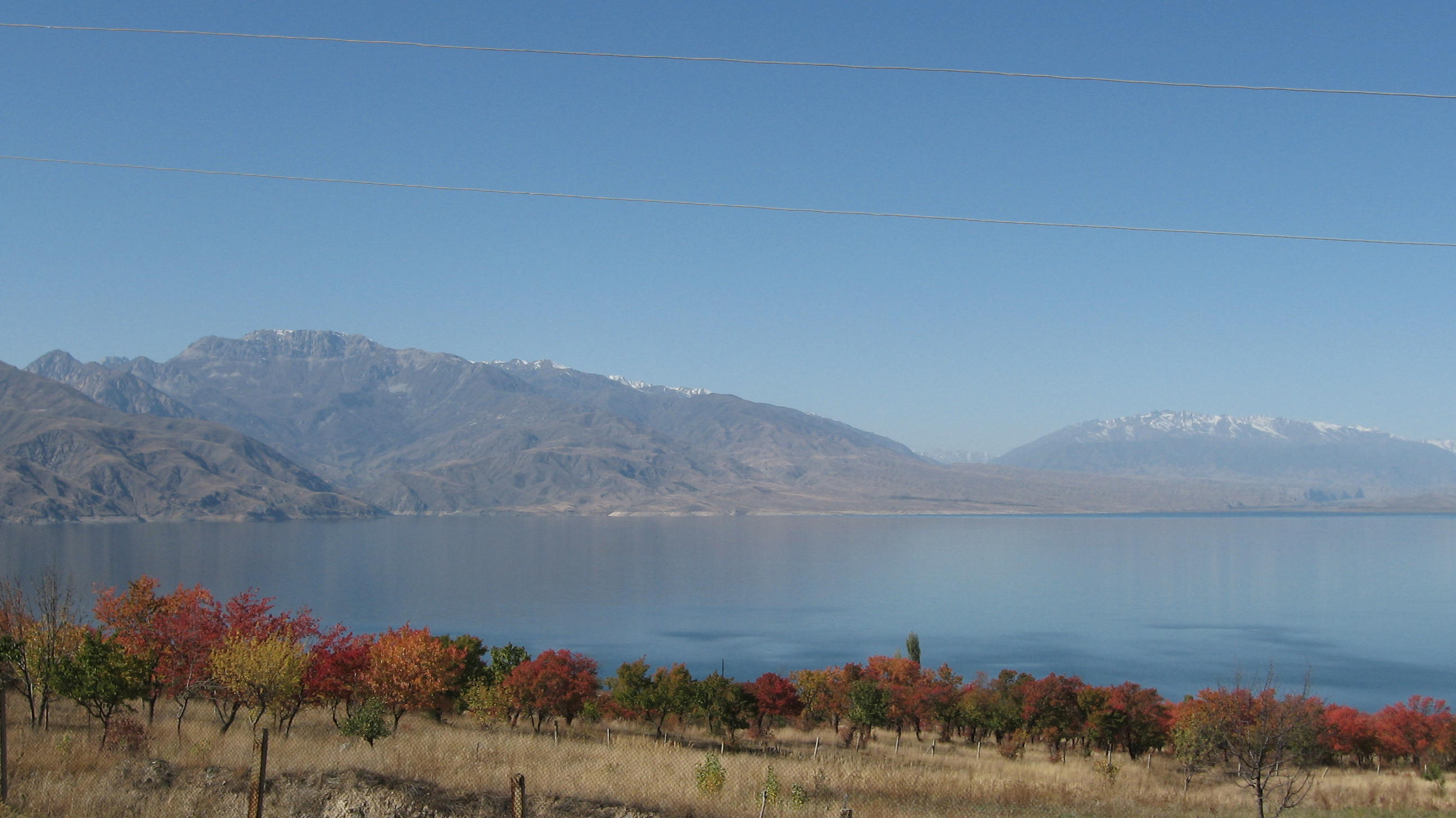

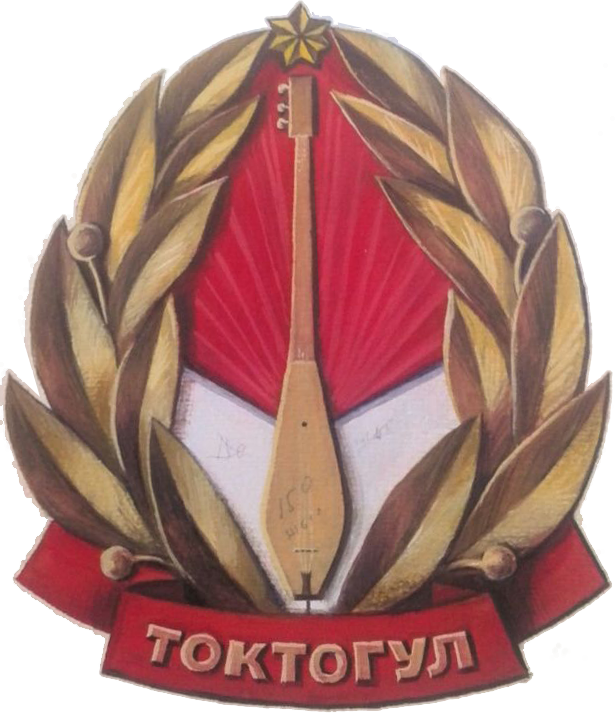
- Flag Coat of arms

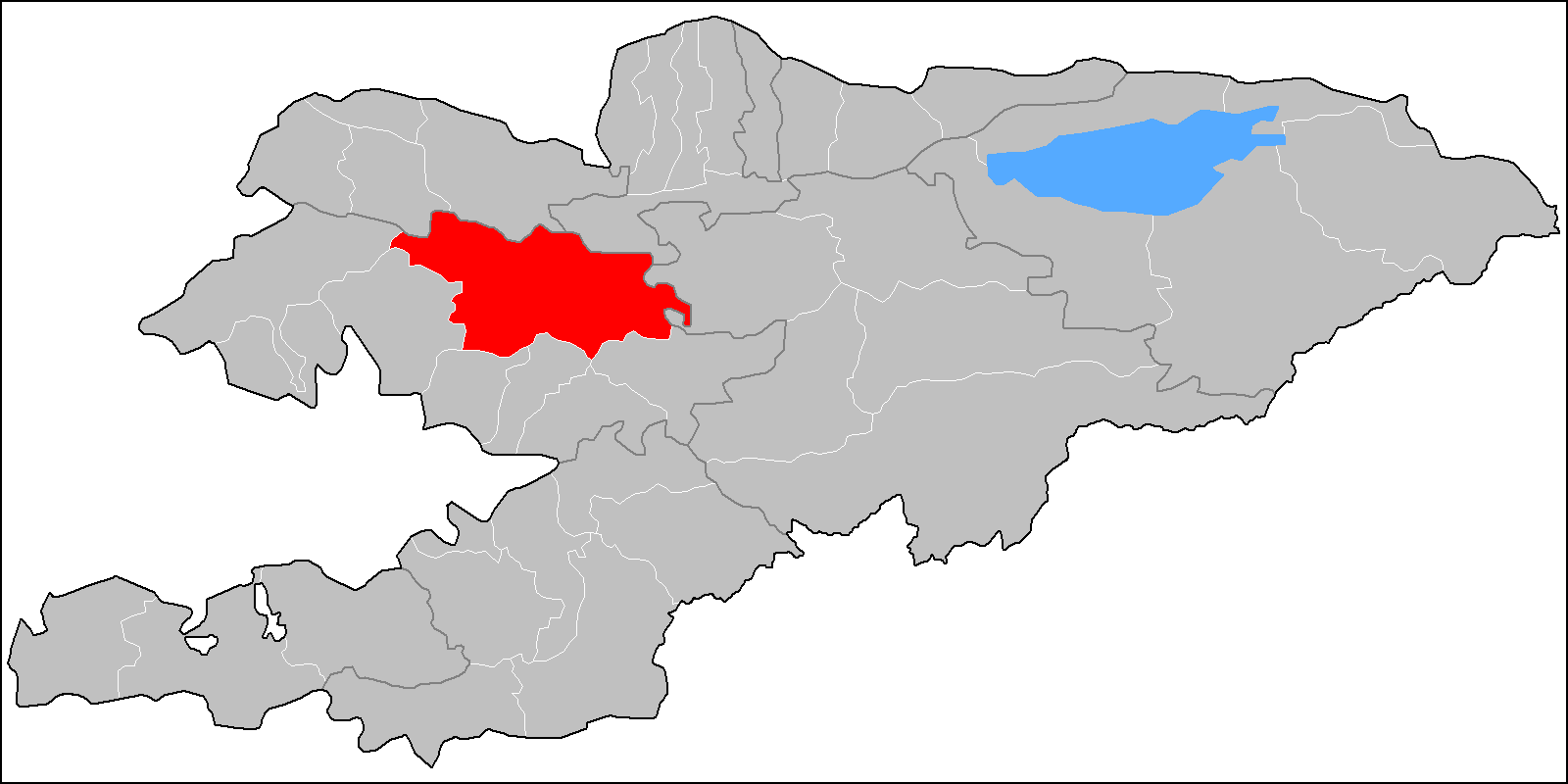
- Country: Kyrgyzstan
- Region: Jalal-Abad Region

Area
  - Total: 7,815 km^{2} (3,017 sq mi)

Population (2021)
  - Total: 103,310
  - Density: 13.22/km^{2} (34.24/sq mi)
- Time zone: UTC+6

Toktogul (Kyrgyz: Токтогул району) is a district of Jalal-Abad Region in western Kyrgyzstan. The administrative seat lies at Toktogul. Its area is 7,815 square kilometres (3,017 sq mi), and its resident population was 103,310 in 2021.

The town and district are named after its most famous son - the musician Toktogul Satylganov. The Toktogul reservoir is a geographical feature of the district and the capital lies on the north shore.

== Geography ==
The district is located in the southern part of the region within the Naryn river valley. It is bordered by Talas Alatau and Suusamyr Too on the north, At-Oynok Range on the west, and by complex system of mountains: Babash-Ata, Fergana Range and Kekirim-Too on the south. Mountain areas are characterized by highly dissected topography. Absolute elevations of ranges reach 4,165m (Uzun-Akhmat mountains) and 4351 m (Kekirim-Too). The valley is at 650–850 m above sea level. Mountains occupy 93%, and valley - 7% of the district. The hydrology is dominated by Naryn river, Torkent river, Uzun-Akmat river, and Kara-Suu river. The Toktogul reservoir and partially Kurpsai reservoir are respectively in the center and south-west part of the district.

== Climate ==
An average temperature in January is -8 °C in valleys, and -12 °C in mountains. In July, an average temperature varies from +26 °C in valleys, to +8 °C in mountains. An absolute recorded temperature minimum was -38° and maximum - +38°. Average yearly precipitation is 400 mm in valleys, and 400–600 mm in mountains. Daily maximum of precipitation can reach 40 mm in valleys and 70 mm in mountains.

== Population ==
Historical population
Year	Pop.	±% p.a.
1970	47,024	—
1979	55,711	+1.90%
1989	69,323	+2.21%
1999	77,202	+1.08%
2009	86,306	+1.12%
2021	103,310	+1.51%
Note: resident population; Sources:

== Cities, rural communities and villages ==
In total, Toktogul District includes 1 city and 49 settlements in 10 rural communities (ayyl aymagy). Each rural community can consist of one or several villages. The rural communities and settlements in the Toktogul District are:

1. city Toktogul
2. Abdy Süyörkulov (seat: Torkent; incl. Kötörmö and Kara-Jygach)
3. Aralbaev (seat: Toluk; incl. Almaluu, Noot and Char-Tash)
4. Bel-Aldy (seat: Sary-Sögöt; incl. Bel-Aldy and Korgon)
5. Cholpon-Ata (seat: Cholpon-Ata; incl. Ak-Tektir, Balykty, Kara-Künggöy, Kushchu-Suu and Mazar-Suu)
6. Jangy-Jol (seat: Jangy-Jol; incl. Aral, Kara-Suu, Komsomol, Kuybyshev and Kyzyl-Tuu)
7. Ketmen-Döbö (seat: Terek-Suu; incl. Beke-Chal, Chong-Aryk, Eshsay, Jangy-Aryk and Kyrk-Kazyk)
8. Kyzyl-Özgörüsh (seat: Kyzyl-Özgörüsh; incl. Ang-Aryk, Bel-Kara-Suu, Buurakan, Jar-Tash, Kamysh-Bashy, Kongur-Ögüz, Kosh-Tash, Orto-Jon, Chech-Döbö, Shayyk and Ak-Jar)
9. Nichke-Say (seat: Nichke-Say; incl. Chorgochu)
10. Sary-Kamysh (seat: Birlik; incl. Kötörmö)
11. Üch-Terek (seat: Üch-Terek; incl. Jetigen, Kyzyl-Uraan, Sargata and Taktalyk)

Note: Kara-Köl is a town of regional significance of Jalal-Abad Region, and is not part of the Toktogul District.

Settlements of the Toktogul District.
