= Andijan uprising of 1898 =

1898 rebellion in the Russian Empire

- Part of the Russian conquest of Central Asia
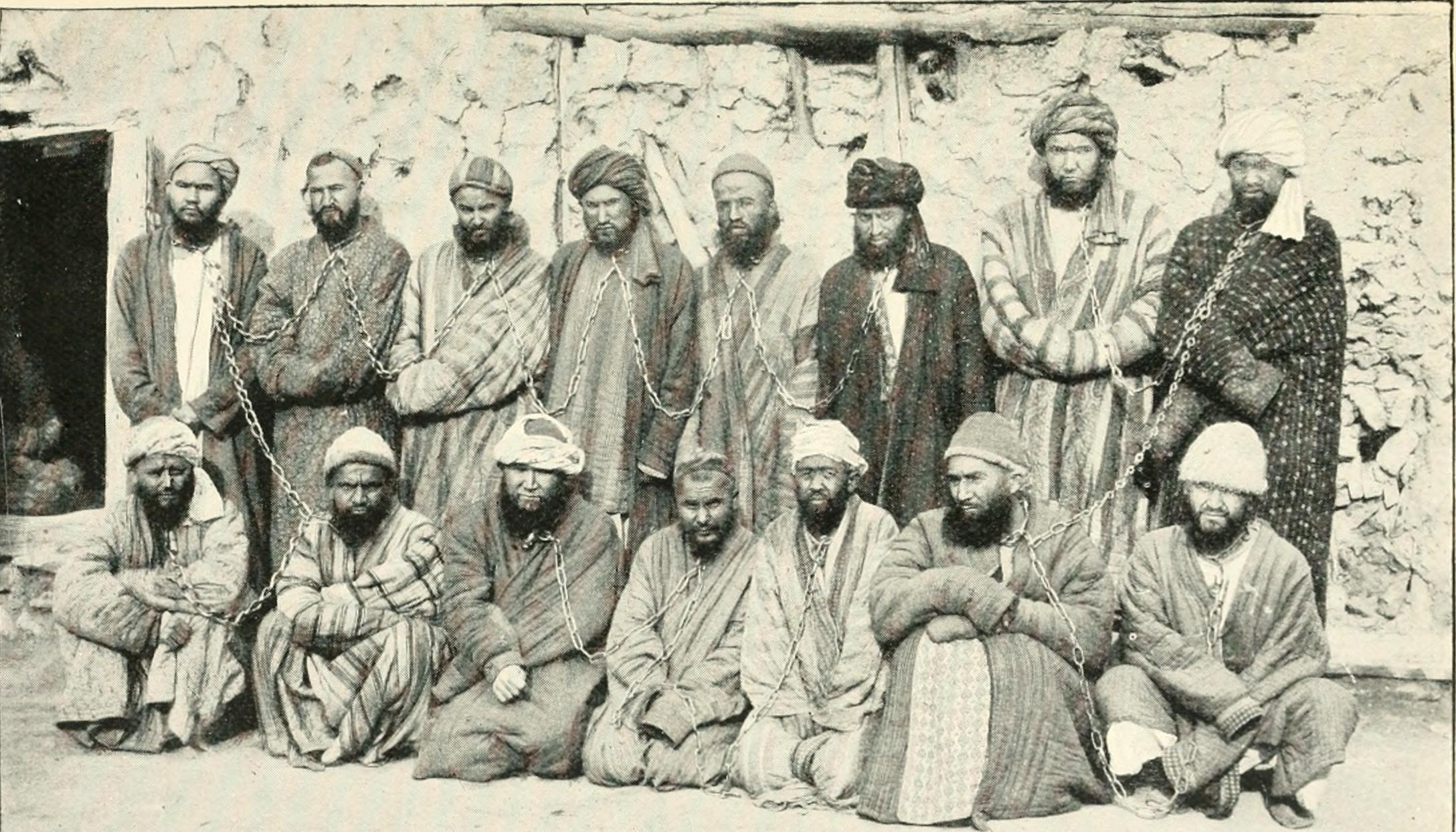
- Insurgents under arrest, 1899
| Date | 29 May [O.S. 17 May] 1898 |
| Location | Andijan, Fergana Oblast, Russian Empire (now Uzbekistan) 40°47′N 72°20′E |
| Result | Russian victory |

Belligerents
| Russian Empire | Kyrgyz rebels; Uzbek rebels |

Commanders and leaders
| Aleksandr Povalo-Shveykovsky | Muhammad Ali Madali (executed); Omurbek Datka |

Strength
| | 1,500 |

Casualties and losses
| 22 dead; 16 wounded | 18 executed; 546 arrested; 356 exiled or sent to forced labour |

The Andijan uprising of 1898 (Note: Uzbek: Андижон қўзғолони, romanized: Andijon qoʻzgʻoloni, IPA: [ˌændɪˈdʒɒn ˌqozʁɒlɒˈnɪ]; Kyrgyz: Анжиян көтөрүлүшү, romanized: Anjiyan kötörülüshü; Kazakh: Әндіжан көтерілісі, romanized: Ändıjan köterılısı; Russian: Андижанское восстание, romanized: Andižanskoje vosstanije) was a nationalist rebellion which occurred on 29 May [O.S. 17 May] 1898. Around 1,500 armed men attacked the Russian forces at Andijan (formerly part of the Khanate of Kokand), under the direction of the Naqshbandi Sufi sheikh "Dukchi Ishan" (Muhammad Ali Madali) (1856–1898). The attack saw the rebels surround the camp, taking the soldiers of the 20th Russian battalion by complete surprise. However, the Russian troops quickly regrouped and managed to rout the rebels. The uprising lasted about 15 minutes.

Twenty-two Russian soldiers died, and 16 were wounded. Other attacks were staged simultaneously at Margilan and Ush. Eighteen participants were executed, including the leader. 546 rebels were arrested, and 356 condemned to forced labour or exile to Siberia (163 were set free). The rebel leader was thought to be representative of the Ottoman Empire (but the credentials proved false), and he was declared khan the day before the revolt.

The majority of the rebels were Kyrgyz, who in 1875 had rebelled against Muhammad Khudayar Khan (who reigned 1845–1858, 1862–1863, and 1867–1875).

Count Konstantin Pahlen, who conducted an inspection tour of Russian Turkestan in 1908–1909, wrote in his memoirs that the rebellion caused considerable alarm within the Tsarist government. Edward Dennis Sokol points out that while this affair might seem insignificant at first glance, it actually revealed widespread dissatisfaction with Tsarist rule in Central asia.

== Motives ==
When the leader of the revolt was asked why he had revolted, he replied:

- That after the conquest by the Russians there took place a strong deterioration in the morals of the people
- Russian non-compliance with Sharia
- That the Russian government, though lenient in their relations with the natives, forbade pilgrimages to Mecca
- The abolition of zakat or religious tax
- Tampering with waqf laws
- That they did not trouble about the support of morality and family life

== Bibliography ==
- Hisao Komatsu, The Andijan Uprising Reconsidered a: Symbiosis and Conflict in Muslim Societies: Historical and Comparative Perspectives, ed. by Tsugitaka Sato, Londres, 2004.
- Erkinov A.S. The Andijan Uprising of 1898 and its leader Dukchi-ishan described by contemporary Poets. TIAS Central Eurasian Research Series No.3. Tokyo, 2009, 118 p.
- Richard A. Pierce, Russian Central Asia 1867–1917 – A study in colonial rule, Berkeley/Los Angeles, 1960
