= Vladimir Grigoryevich Kornilov =

Soviet writer (1923–2002)

- Владимир Григорьевич Корнилов
- Born: March 22, 1923; Saint Petersburg
- Died: July 19, 2002 (aged 79); Kostroma
- Occupation: writer
- Writing career
- Language: Russian
- Years active: 1954—2002
- Notable awards: Maxim Gorky RSFSR State Prize

Vladimir Grigorievich Kornilov (Russian: Владимир Григорьевич Корни́лов; March 22, 1923 – July 19, 2002) was a Russian Soviet writer, publicist and public figure.

He founded the Kostroma organization of the Writers' Union and led the organization for more than 27 years. Through this organization, Kornilov supported a generation of Kostroma prose writers and poets. He was an honorary citizen of the city of Kostroma. Author of 24 separate literary publications and reprints, as well as more than 100 publications in the media. Member of the Council of Elders of the Union of Writers of Russia. For his active participation in public affairs and principled positions, he received the honorary nickname “Conscience of the City” from the residents of Kostroma.

== Biography ==
Vladimir Grigorievich Kornilov was born on March 22, 1923, in Petrograd. His father was Kornilov Grigory Petrovich (11/3/1893 - 7/24/1980) - a convinced Bolshevik, who always put public interests above personal ones. Being a responsible employee of the People's Commissariat of Forestry, he was forced to often change the place of residence of the entire family due to his duties. His mother was Kornilova (Belova) Lidia Vasilievna (03/26/1903 - 02/03/1969) - a housewife who had an excellent education and upbringing, as well as many abilities (for example: literature, organizing and running public theaters, social activities, showed herself to be a skilled draftsman, artist, etc.) From early childhood, Kornilov, thanks to his father's work, his business trips and assignments, traveled all over the country: Leningrad and Moscow, the Far East and Crimea, the Urals, Kirov, which greatly contributed to his observations of life in all its manifestations. He graduated from high school in the city of Sovetsk, Kirov Oblast, in June 1941. His first steps into adulthood coincided with the beginning of the World War II.

Despite severe myopia, Vladimir Grigorievich achieved assignment to the active army. After graduating from the Kyiv Military Medical School, evacuated to Sverdlovsk (now Yekaterinburg), he was sent to the front. And even having the opportunity to choose, he asked to join a regular infantry unit. From September 1942 - on the Western Front, in a separate rifle battalion of the 142nd separate rifle brigade, as a military paramedic, and then from July 1943 - commander of a medical platoon of the battalion of the 633rd rifle regiment of the 157th division. He fought through the Moscow region, the Rzhev direction, the Smolensk region, Belarus, and was wounded three times. In January 1944 (he was not yet 20 years old), near the city of Vitebsk he was seriously wounded (with high amputation of both legs). He was treated in various hospitals until October 1945.

Kornilov found the courage and strength to overcome the severity of his disability. He is learning to walk again, without crutches, only with the help of a cane and prostheses for both legs. In 1946-1952 he studied at the Maxim Gorky Literature Institute in Moscow, graduated with honors and was sent to creative work in the city of Kuibyshev as the executive secretary of the regional writers' organization (1952-1960). Here he publishes the story “The Forest Master” (1954), a book of essays “About Good and Different People” (1956), the story “March Stars” (1957), and edits the literary almanac “Volga”. In Kuibyshev he lived at the address: Mayakovskogo str., no. 20, apt. 3.

In 1960, Vladimir Grigorievich SP of the RSFSR went to Kostroma, created and headed the Kostroma Writers' Organization. For 27 years (1961-1988) he headed it, holding the post of executive secretary, devoting his strength and talent to helping young authors, working to improve the level of professional skills of Kostroma writers, multiplying the ranks of writers. In addition, Kornilov takes an active social position, participating in the public life of the city and region. Here, in Kostroma, his writing talent develops in full force: he creates his main work - the novel trilogy “Semigorye” (1974), “Godins” (1984), “Idealist” (1999), devoting 35 years of his creative life to it, as well as a series of essays about the people of the Kostroma land and the romantic story “Spark” (1995). After his death, a collection of wonderful stories, lyrical in form, but imbued with deep philosophical reflections, “My Brides” (2003) was published.

Despite his disability, Vladimir Grigorievich Kornilov tried to lead a full life and remained socially active until his last days. He walked independently on prosthetics only with the help of a cane, drove a car, skied, and was a passionate and skilled hunter and fisherman. He was married three times (he has a son from his second marriage).

He died on July 19, 2002, in Kostroma from heart disease.

== Awards ==
- Maxim Gorky RSFSR State Prize (1985) - for the novels “Semigorye” and “Godiny” (the Prize was donated to the needs of the library of the village of B. Sandogora, Kostroma district, Kostroma region, now bearing his name).
- Three Orders of the Patriotic War, 1st degree (02/01/1944, 05/17/1944, 04/06/1985).
- Order of Friendship of Peoples (1983).
- Order of the Badge of Honor (1973).
- Medals and certificates of honor (more than 16 awards in total).
- Honorary citizen of Kostroma (1998)
- Regional award "Recognition".
- Member of the Council of Elders of the Writers' Union of Russia
- Member of the Supreme Creative Council of the Russian Federation.

== Works ==
The work of V. G. Kornilov is considered of literary value for his unique handling of the Russian language, word-creation, and close attention to the origins of Russian literature. The characters of the heroes and characters of his works are always revealed not only through their actions, but through the precise nuances of their vocabulary. The plots, compositions and precision of the narrative are popular due to them being generally accessible to a wide audience. Much of Kornilov's work is about deep philosophical ideas regarding the role of man in Nature and the surrounding world and his characters interactions with them.

== Recognition ==
More than 75 lifetime and more than one and a half dozen posthumous publications in Russian and regional media were devoted to V. G. Kornilov.

In accordance with the current legislation of the Kostroma region, the name of V. G. Kornilov was given to:

- Sandogorsk Rural Library named after V. G. Kornilov - branch No. 19 of the municipal cultural institution "Centralized Library System of the Kostroma District", located at the address: Kostroma region, Kostroma district, village. B. Sandogora, st. Central, 4
- Library No. 5 named after V. G. Kornilov of the municipal cultural institution "Centralized library system of the city of Kostroma", located at the address: Kostroma, Yakimanikha microdistrict, 18.

In 2009, in the online voting “The Name of the Land of Kostroma”, conducted by the Youth Affairs Committee of the Kostroma Region, on the eve of the 65th anniversary of the creation of the Kostroma Region, the name of the writer V. G. Kornilov won a convincing victory, ahead of the nearest applicant (Ivan Susanin) by 35 votes.

The works of V. G. Kornilov are recommended for study in educational institutions of the Kostroma region.

== Foundation ==
In May 2010, the son of V. G. Kornilov, together with people who were not indifferent to his life and work, created the NGO “Humanitarian Foundation “LIGHT” named after the writer V. G. Kornilov”, which is engaged in preserving the memory of the writer, disseminating his work, contributes to the study of his philosophical heritage. On a voluntary basis, a memorial residential complex for the writer is being created in a house in the Zaozerye farmstead (Kostroma region, Kostroma district).
