= Ahmad Kasani =

16th-century Muslim saint from central Asia

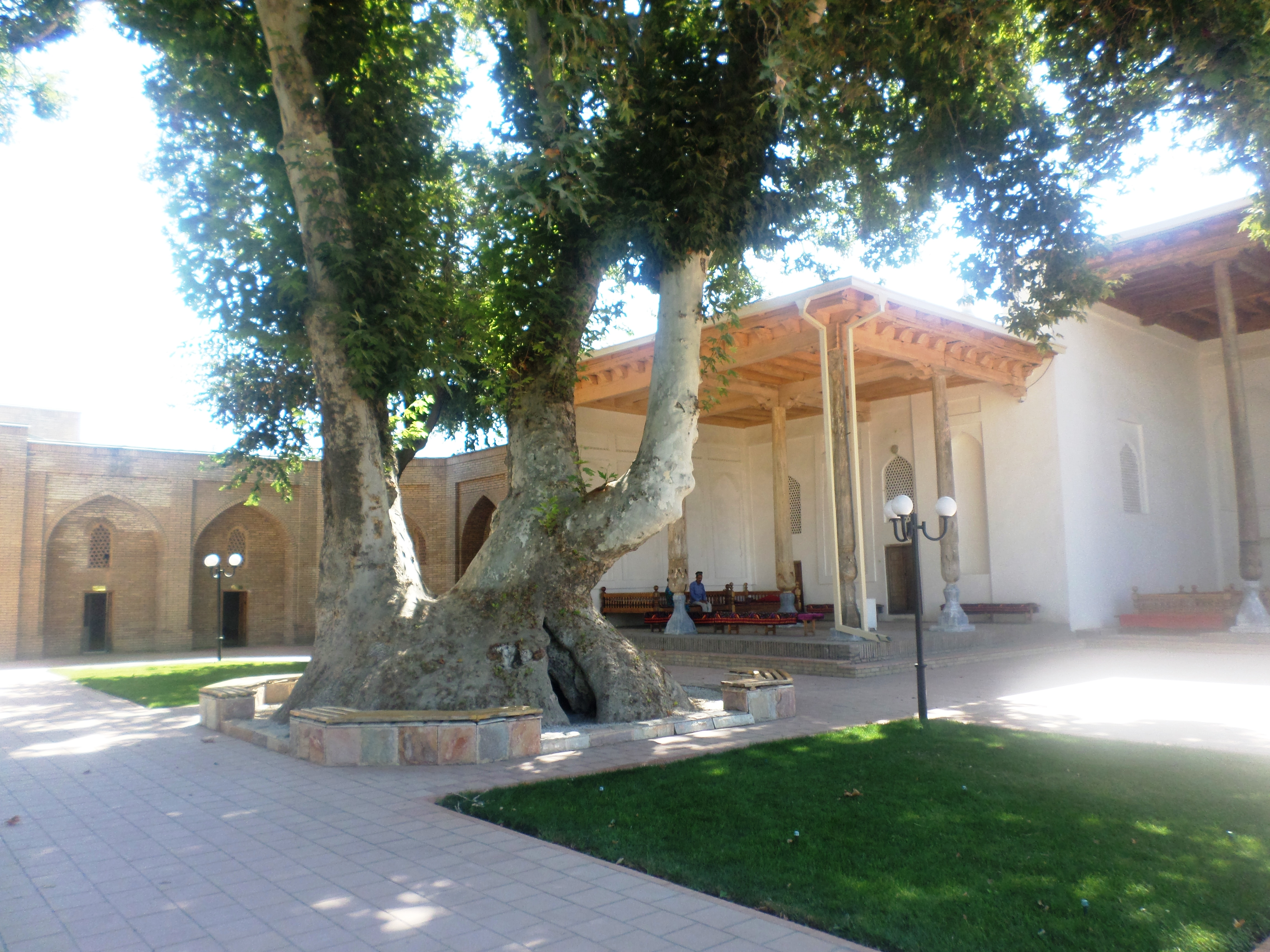
The mausoleum of Aḥmad al-Kāsānī in Dahbīd

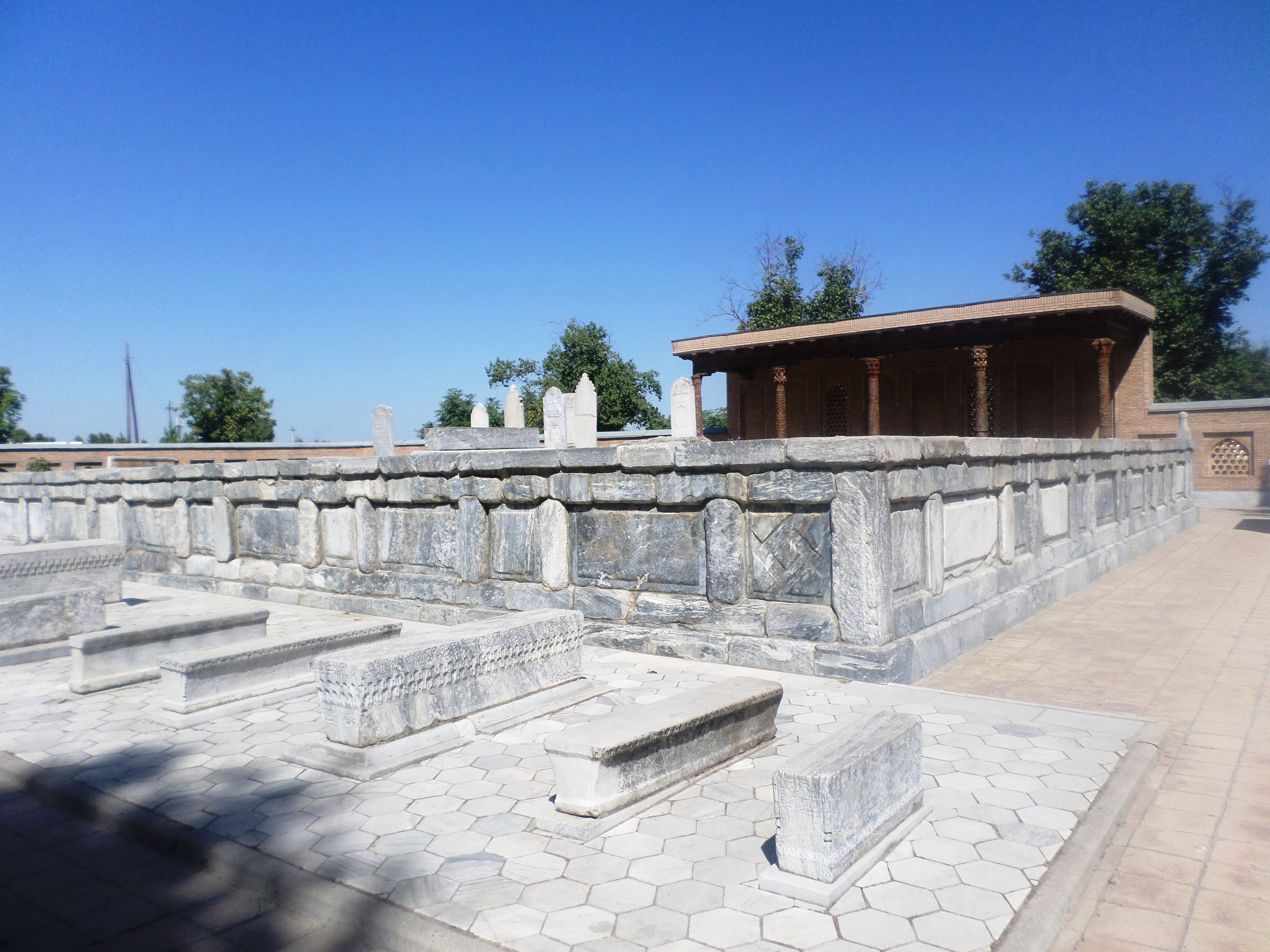
His tomb

Aḥmad Khwājagī b. Jalāl ad-Dīn al-Kāsānī (Persian: احمد خواجگی بن جلال‌الدین کاسانی; Uzbek: Ahmad Xojagi b. Jaloliddin Kosoniy; died 1542–43), revered as the Makhdūm-i Aʿẓam (Persian: مخدوم اعظم; Uzbek: Maxdumi Aʼzam, 'Greatest Teacher'), was a Ṣūfī saint of the Naqshbandiyya. He was born in a sayyed family of the Farghāna valley and became a disciple of Khwāja Aḥrār in Tāshkand. He created a Ṣūfī hostel in Bukhārā and died in his estate in Dahbīd. His descendants dominated the history of Eastern Turkistān in the 17th–18th centuries. Among them was Āfāq Khwāja, who preached in Kāshghar.
