= Ketmen-Töbö Valley =

- Kyrgyz: Кетментөбө өрөөнү
- Location within Kyrgyzstan
- Floor elevation: 800–1,200 m (2,600–3,900 ft)
- Length: 50 km (31 mi)
- Width: 22 km (14 mi)
- Area: 8,170 km^{2} (3,150 mi^{2})

Geology
- Type: Tectonic valley (asymmetric graben-megasynecline)
- Age: Paleogene, Neogene and Quaternary sedimentary deposits over Paleozoic bedrock

Geography
- Country: Kyrgyzstan
- State/Province: Jalal-Abad Region
- Borders on: List: Talas Ala-Too; Suusamyr Too; Uzun-Akmat Range; Atoynok Range; Fergana Range; Kögürümtoo Range
- Coordinates: 41°50′N 72°55′E
- Traversed by: European route E010
- Rivers: Karasuu; Chychkan; Uzuun-Akhmat; Torken
- Interactive map of Ketmen-Töbö Valley

Ketmen-Töbö Valley (Kyrgyz: Кетмен-Төбө өрөөнү or Кетментөбө өрөөнү) is a tectonic valley in the Inner Tian Shan of Kyrgyzstan. It is bounded by the Talas Ala-Too and Suusamyr Too to the north, the Uzun-Akmat Range and At-Oynok Range to the west and southwest, the Fergana Range to the south, and the Kögürüm-Тоо Range to the southeast.

== Geography ==
The valley covers an area of 8,170 square kilometres (3,150 sq mi). Its prevailing elevations range from 800 to 1,200 metres (2,600 to 3,900 ft) above sea level. The valley floor is about 50 kilometres (31 mi) long and 22 kilometres (14 mi) wide. It generally slopes slightly westward and consists of alluvial fan deposits, proluvial and deluvial plains, and river terraces. The valley is dissected by numerous small streams, gullies, ravines and dry channels, usually 5 to 10 metres (16 to 33 ft) deep. Irrigation canals are widespread.

== Geology and tectonics ==
The valley contains Paleogene, Neogene and Quaternary sedimentary deposits up to 2 kilometres (1.2 mi) thick, which overlie Paleozoic bedrock. Structurally, it is an east–west-trending asymmetric graben-megasynecline. The valley formed during Neogene mountain-building processes as a result of increased compression along the Talas–Fergana Fault.

== Mineral resources ==
The principal mineral resource of the valley is rock salt, occurring in Neogene lacustrine deposits. The main occurrence is the Ketmen-Töbö salt deposit.

== Climate ==
The climate is sharply continental. The average temperature is about 24 °C (75 °F) in July and −14 °C (7 °F) in January. Mean annual precipitation is approximately 376 millimetres (14.8 in).

== Hydrology ==
Major rivers include the Karasuu, Chychkan, Uzun-Akmat and Torken. The largest lake is Karasuu, with an area of 3.88 square kilometres (1.50 sq mi). The Toktogul Reservoir occupies about 284 square kilometres (110 sq mi) of the valley and is one of its dominant geographical features.

== Landscapes ==
The valley is characterized by several altitudinal landscape belts:

- ephemeral-wormwood semi-desert on grey soils at 800 to 1,300 metres (2,600 to 4,300 ft);
- wormwood-feather grass dry steppe on light chestnut soils at 1,300 to 2,000 metres (4,300 to 6,600 ft);
- feather-grass and mixed-herb steppe, and forest-meadow steppe on dark chestnut soils at 2,000 to 2,800 metres (6,600 to 9,200 ft);
- subalpine and alpine meadows at 3,200 to 3,500 metres (10,500 to 11,500 ft);
- glacial-nival landscapes with scree, permanent snow and glaciers above 3,500 metres (11,500 ft).

== Transportation ==
The Bishkek–Osh Highway (M41 or ЭМ-04), (European route E010), traverses the Ketmen-Töbö Valley. Entering the valley through the Chychkan Gorge, the highway follows the northeastern and southern shores of the Toktogul Reservoir and provides the principal road connection between northern and southern Kyrgyzstan.
