= Üch-Terek =

Üch-Terek Үч-Терек
- Location within Kyrgyzstan
- Coordinates: 41°45′50″N 73°11′40″E
- Country: Kyrgyzstan
- Region: Jalal-Abad
- District: Toktogul

Population (2021)
  - Total: 3,717
- Time zone: UTC+6

Üch-Terek (Kyrgyz: Үч-Терек) is a village in Jalal-Abad Region of Kyrgyzstan. It is part of the Toktogul District. Its population was 3,717 in 2021.
