= Mazar-Suu =

Mazar-Suu Мазар-Суу
- Location within Kyrgyzstan
- Coordinates: 41°54′36″N 72°39′36″E
- Country: Kyrgyzstan
- Region: Jalal-Abad
- District: Toktogul
- Elevation: 1,143 m (3,750 ft)

Population (2021)
  - Total: 1,968
- Time zone: UTC+6

Mazar-Suu (Kyrgyz: Мазар-Суу) is a village in Jalal-Abad Region of Kyrgyzstan. It is part of the Toktogul District. Its population was 1,968 in 2021.
