= Sargata =

Sargata Саргата
- Location within Kyrgyzstan
- Coordinates: 41°43′48″N 73°12′0″E
- Country: Kyrgyzstan
- Region: Jalal-Abad Region
- District: Toktogul District
- Elevation: 1,057 m (3,468 ft)

Population (2021)
  - Total: 2,962
- Time zone: UTC+6

Sargata is a village in Jalal-Abad Region of Kyrgyzstan. It is part of the Toktogul District. Its population was 2,962 in 2021.
