= Chong-Aryk =

Chong-Aryk Чоң-Арык
- Location within Kyrgyzstan
- Coordinates: 41°53′30″N 72°38′40″E
- Country: Kyrgyzstan
- Region: Jalal-Abad
- District: Toktogul
- Elevation: 1,014 m (3,327 ft)

Population (2021)
  - Total: 3,523
- Time zone: UTC+6

Chong-Aryk (Kyrgyz: Чоң-Арык) is a village in Jalal-Abad Region of Kyrgyzstan. It is part of the Toktogul District. Its population was 3,523 in 2021. It lies near the northwestern end of the Toktogul Reservoir.
