= Kyzyl-Özgörüsh =

Kyzyl-Özgörüsh Кызыл-Өзгөрүш
- Location within Kyrgyzstan
- Coordinates: 41°37′48″N 73°24′36″E
- Country: Kyrgyzstan
- Region: Jalal-Abad Region
- District: Toktogul District
- Elevation: 1,914 m (6,280 ft)

Population (2021)
  - Total: 2,368
- Time zone: UTC+6

Kyzyl-Özgörüsh is a village in Jalal-Abad Region of Kyrgyzstan. It is part of the Toktogul District. Its population was 2,368 in 2021.
