= Kyzyl-Tuu, Toktogul =

Kyzyl-Tuu Кызыл-Туу
- Location within Kyrgyzstan
- Coordinates: 41°53′10″N 72°56′30″E
- Country: Kyrgyzstan
- Region: Jalal-Abad
- District: Toktogul

Population (2021)
  - Total: 4,031
- Time zone: UTC+6

Kyzyl-Tuu is a village in the Jalal-Abad Region of Kyrgyzstan. It is part of the Toktogul District. Its population was 4,031 in 2021.
