= Īshān =

Honorific title given to Sufi leaders in Central Asia

Īshān (from Persian ایشان 'they'; Chagatay: ایشان; Kazakh: ишан; Kyrgyz: эшен; Tajik: эшон; Tatar: ишан; Turkmen: işan; Uyghur: ئىشان; Uzbek: eshon; Chinese: 依禪; pinyin: yīchán) is an honorific title given to Sufi leaders in Central Asia. According to Jianping Wang, "In the Sufi doctrine found in E[ast] Turkestan, the ishan has a serene nature, acting as an intermediary between Muslims and Allah. An ishan has leadership over his group, and can nominate his khalifa and hafiz as well as initiating maulid and buwi into the sub-order. Usually, an ishan will have inherited his position from within his family and pass it on to his descendants."

== List of īshāns ==
- Afaq Khoja
- Muhammad Ali Madali
- Hazrat Ishaan

== See also ==
- Shaykh
