= Nichke-Say =

Nichke-Say Ничке-Сай
- Location within Kyrgyzstan
- Coordinates: 41°42′36″N 73°24′36″E
- Country: Kyrgyzstan
- Region: Jalal-Abad Region
- District: Toktogul District
- Elevation: 1,464 m (4,803 ft)

Population (2021)
  - Total: 2,279
- Time zone: UTC+6

Nichke-Say is a village in Jalal-Abad Region of the country Kyrgyzstan. It is part of the Toktogul District. Its population was 2,279 in 2021.
