= Noot, Toktogul =

Noot Ноот
- Location within Kyrgyzstan
- Coordinates: 41°53′58″N 73°35′45″E
- Country: Kyrgyzstan
- Region: Jalal-Abad Region
- District: Toktogul District
- Elevation: 1,400 m (4,600 ft)

Population (2021)
  - Total: 832
- Time zone: UTC+6

Noot is a village in Jalal-Abad Region of Kyrgyzstan. It is part of the Toktogul District. Its population was 832 in 2021.
