= Mayramkan Abylkasymova =

Kyrgyz poet (1936–2021)

Mayramkan Abylkasymova (November 7, 1936 – October 16, 2021; Kyrgyz: Майрамкан Абылкасымова) was a Kyrgyz poet and editor, designated a "People's Poet of Kyrgyzstan."

== Early life and education ==
Mayramkan Abylkasymova was born on November 7, 1936, in the village of Almaluu, Kemin, Kyrgyzstan.

She attended a seven-year rural school, graduating in 1950. She then began studying to become a teacher, eventually graduating in 1958 from the Kyrgyz Women's Pedagogical Institute named for Vladimir Mayakovsky, a precursor to Kyrgyz State University of Arabaev. From 1960 to 1962, she worked as a teacher at the Osh Pedagogical Institute, a forerunner of Osh State University.

== Writing ==
Abylkasymova is best known as a poet, having begun to publish poetry in 1952. In 1961, she published her debut collection, Маленьким друзьям ("Little Friends"). In her work, she drew inspiration from fellow Kyrgyz writers Alykul Osmonov and Aaly Tokombaev. She was also a member of the Communist Party of the Soviet Union and wrote patriotic poetry about the Kyrgyz people and about war in socialist countries.

In 1970, she won the all-union Lenin Komsomol Prize for her poem "Эстелик сүйлөйт" ("The Monument Speaks") and her collection Ишеним дайым жүрөктө ("Faith Is Always in My Heart"). A decade later, in 1980, she was designated as a "People's Poet of Kyrgyzstan." Her collection Гүлдөр суу сурайт ("Flowers Ask for Water") was awarded the Kyrgyz State Prize in 1984. Her work has been translated into various languages, including English in the 1976 anthology The Tender Muse.

Abylkasymova also worked at various publications throughout her career, beginning at a local newspaper in the Osh Region from 1958 to 1960. Then, from 1962 to 1970 she worked for the literary and art magazine Ala-Too. She left for two years to consult for the Writers' Union in the Issyk-Kul Region before returning to Ala-Too in 1972, where she worked for another 20 years, including as head of the magazine's poetry department. Later on, she edited the weekly newspaper Asylzat.

She was a member of the Union of Writers of the Kyrgyz Republic since 1964.

== Personal life and death ==
Abylkasymova was married to Sagyn Namatbayev, a translator. Their daughter is the journalist Tolkun Namatbaeva. The poet died in October 2021 at age 85.
