= Torkent =

- Location within Kyrgyzstan
- Coordinates: 41°50′30″N 73°9′0″E
- Country: Kyrgyzstan
- Region: Jalal-Abad Region
- District: Toktogul District
- Established: 1936

Population (2021)
  - Total: 6,198
- Time zone: UTC+6

Torkent is a village in Jalal-Abad Region of Kyrgyzstan established in 1936. It is part of the Toktogul District. Its population was 6.198 in 2021.

== Population ==
Historical population
Year	Pop.	±% p.a.
2002	4,500	—
2009	4,326	−0.56%
2021	6,198	+3.04%
Note: resident population; Sources:
