= Aral, Toktogul District =

Aral
- Location within Kyrgyzstan
- Coordinates: 41°54′50″N 72°54′10″E
- Country: Kyrgyzstan
- Region: Jalal-Abad Region
- District: Toktogul District
- Elevation: 860 m (2,820 ft)

Population (2021)
  - Total: 1,466
- Time zone: UTC+6

Aral is a village in Toktogul District, Jalal-Abad Region of Kyrgyzstan. Its population was 1,466 in 2021.
