= Afaq Khoja =

Religious and political leader (1626–1694)

- ئاپاق خوجا
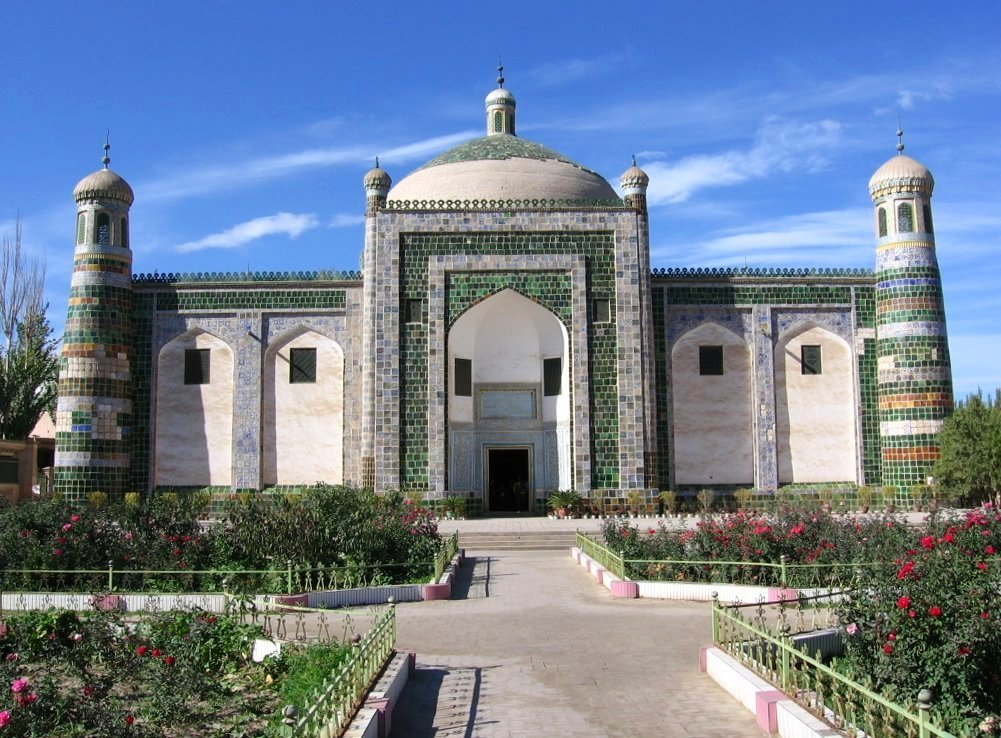
- The mausoleum of Afaq Khoja near Kashgar, East Turkestan
- Title: Khwāja, Īshān

Personal life
- Born: 1626 Kumul, present-day Hami, East Turkestan
- Died: 1693 or 1694 Kashgar, Yarkent Khanate
- Children: Yahiya Khoja
- Parent(s): Muhammad Yusuf Khoja (father), Zuleiha Begum (mother)
- Era: 17th century
- Region: Kashgaria, Eastern Turkistan
- Known for: Naqshbandi Sufi master, leader of the Afaqi Khojas, and political ruler in Kashgaria under Dzungar suzerainty
- Other names: Āfāq Khwāja (آفاق خواجه), Apaq Xoja, Khwāja Hidāyat Allāh (خواجه هدایت‌الله), Yīdáyǎ Túlēilā (伊達雅圖勒拉), Āpàkè Huòjiā (阿帕克霍加), Āpàkè Hézhuō (阿帕克和卓)
- Occupation: Sufi shaykh, religious leader, political ruler

Religious life
- Religion: Islam
- Denomination: Sunni
- Order: Naqshbandiyya
- School: Aq Taghlik (Afaqi Khoja, White Mountain tradition)
- Movement: Afaqi Khojas (Āfāqiyya)

Muslim leader
- Teacher: Muhammad Yusuf Khoja (father and religious mentor)
- Influenced by: Muhammad Yusuf Khoja, Makhdum-i Azam (through the ancestral Naqshbandi spiritual lineage)
- Influenced: Ma Laichi, Ma Shouzhen, Ma Zongsheng, the Afaqi Khoja lineage, and Naqshbandi Muslim communities among the Hui and Salar of Gansu and Qinghai

Afaq Khoja (Uyghur: ئاپاق خوجا), born Hidayat Allah (Uyghur: ھىدايەت ئاللاھ;, also known as Apaq Xoja or more properly (Note: Khwāja Āfāq or Khoja Afaq, are spellings preferred by modern scholars, e.g. Kim (2004) or Gladney (1999).) Āfāq Khwāja (Persian: آفاق خواجه), was a Naqshbandi īshān and political leader with the title of Khwaja in Kashgaria (in present-day Southern Xinjiang, China). He was also known as Khwāja Hidāyat Allāh (خواجه هدایت‌الله).

== Spelling variants ==
In Chinese, Afaq Khoja is known as 伊達雅圖勒拉; Yīdáyǎ Túlēilā. His name is also written as 阿帕克霍加 (Āpàkè Huòjiā) or 阿帕克和卓 (Āpàkè Hézhuō) and occasionally just 阿帕霍加 (Āpà Huòjiā); Khoja may also appear as 和卓 (Hézhuō). In the Uyghur Latin alphabet, it is written as Apaq Xoja and in Modern Uyghur script as ئاپاق خوجا.

== Biography ==
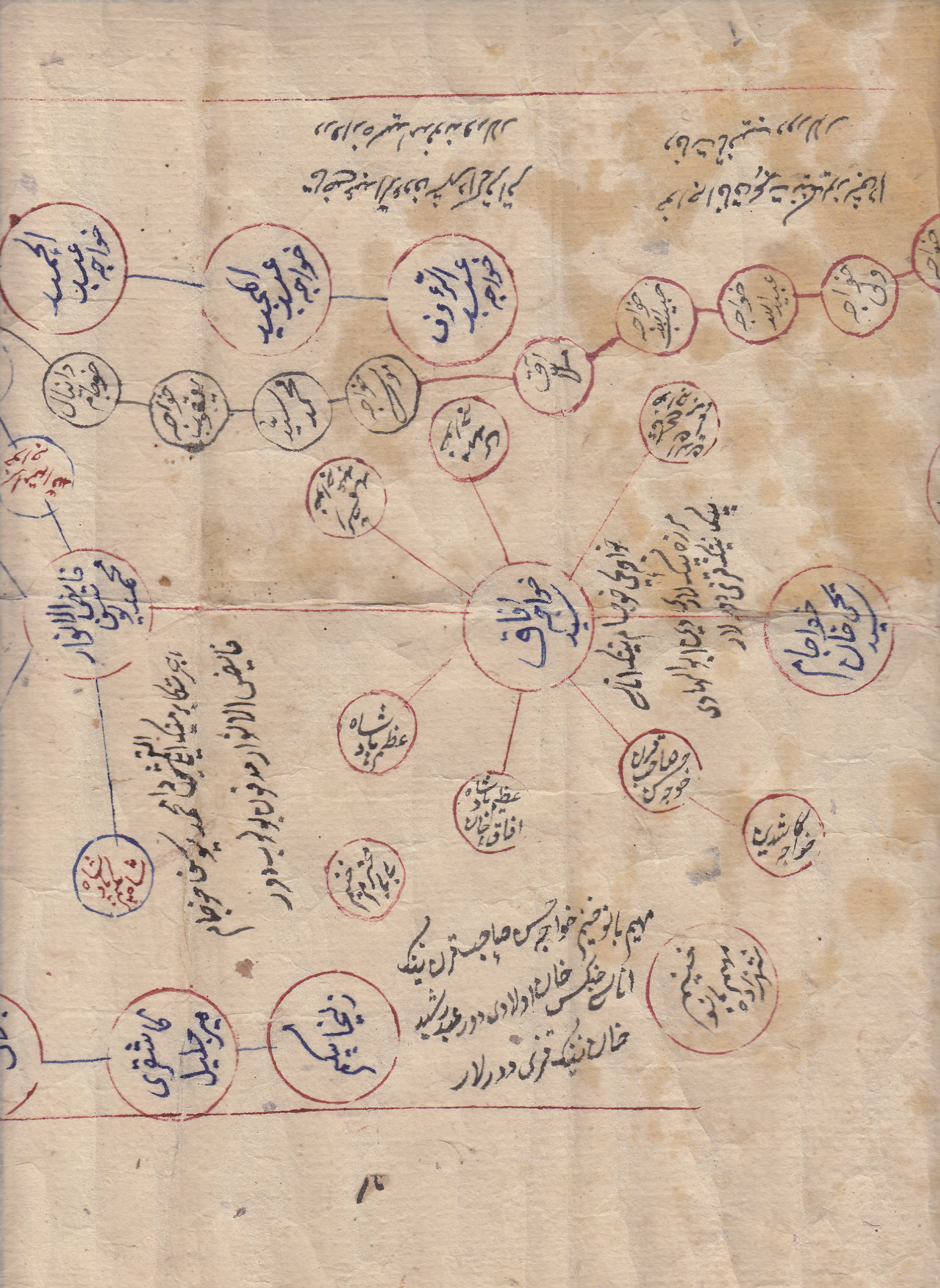
Genealogy book showing Afaq Khoja as a sayid, a descendant of Muhammad

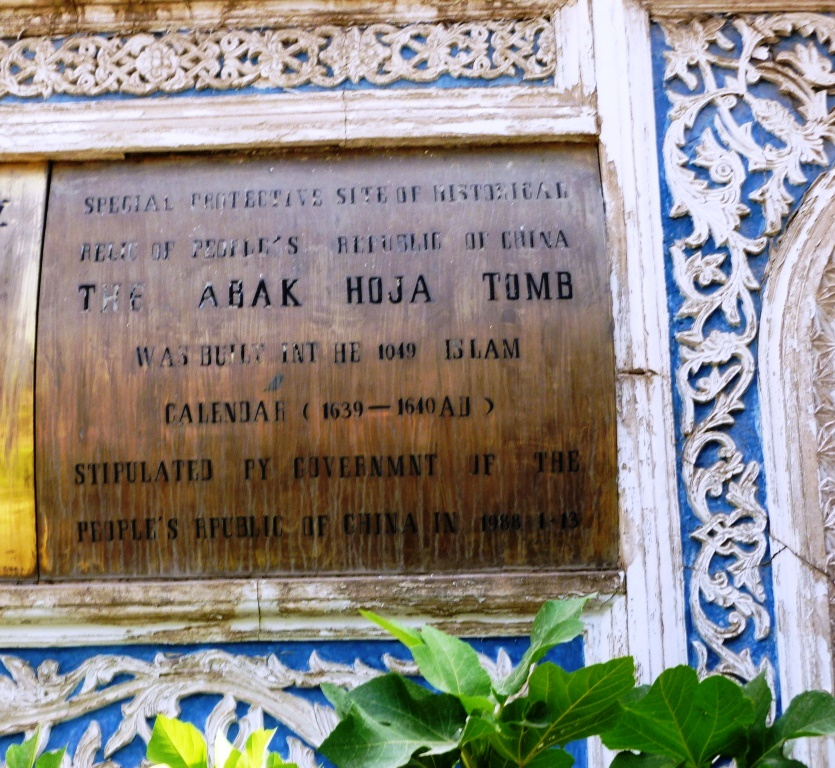
Sign for Afaq Khoja's tomb, Kashgar

Under the later Chagatai Khans, Islam recovered from the set-back it had received from the invasions of Chengiz Khan and his immediate successors, thanks mainly to the influence of Bokhara and Samarcand, which had become important centres of Moslem learning. During the reign of Rashid Khan, the celebrated saint Sayyid Khoja Hasan, more generally known as Makhdum-i-Azam (مخدومِ اعظم) or "The Great Master", visited Kashgar from Samarkand and was received with extraordinary honours. The saint's sons settled at Kashgar, where their father had married a wife and had received rich estates, and gradually established a theocracy, laying upon the necks of the submissive, apathetic people a heavy yoke which they still bear. In course of time two parties were formed whose influence on the subsequent history of the country has been profound. The supporters of the elder son were termed Ak Taulin or "White Mountaineers", from the name of the range behind Artush, their headquarters, whereas the supporters of the younger were known as Kara Taulin or "Black Mountaineers", from the hills near Khan Arik. Both parties of Khojas. as they were termed, aimed at political supremacy and intrigued with any external power that appeared likely to favour their ambitions.

— Sir Percy Sykes and Ella Sykes.

Afaq Khoja was a great-grandson of the noted Naqshbandi Sufi teacher, Ahmad Kasani (احمد کاسانی) (1461–1542) (also known as Makhdūm-i`Azam, مخدومِ اعظم, "the Great Master") and was revered as a Sufi teacher in his own right. Afaq was born in 1626 in Kumul, where his father Muhammad Yusuf Khoja preached. His mother Zuleiha Begum was the daughter of Mir Sayyid Jalil Kashgari, a rich bek from the village of Bashkerim in the Kashgar Region, who settled in Kumul after fleeing from Kashgar several years previously. In 1638, at the age of 12, he came with his father to Kashgar and settled there. Yarkent Khanate ruler Abdullah Khan (1638–1669) granted his father Bashkerim village and many inhabitants of Kashgar Region became disciples of the Ishkiyya Sufi order, a branch of the Nakshbandi Khojas founded by Muhammad Yusuf Khoja's father Khoja Kalan and whose followers were known as Ak Taghliks or White Mountain Khojas.

Among some Uyghur Muslims, Khoja Appak was considered a sayyid or descendant of Muhammad. As a highly respected religious figure, he was in a clash with ruling elite of the Chagatai (Moghul) dynasty and this conflict had both a religious and secular nature. For the religious part he was an advocator of implementing Islamic Sharia law against Mongol Yassa law which was in force at that time while for the secular part he heavily criticized the luxurious lifestyle which the ruling elites enjoyed. This clash proved serious due to the fact that Chagatai Khan (c. 1185–1241 or 1242) had been appointed by Genghis Khan to see if the Yassa was observed so it eventually resulted in expelling of Afaq Khoja by Ismail Khan (1669, 1670–1678), the later ruler of the Yarkent Khanate. Since the Ishaki Khojas were another offshoot of the Naqshbandi Sufis, Ismail Khan purposefully approached the Ishaki khojas (also known as the Kara Taghliks, i.e. Black Mountain Khojas) to balance Afaq Khoja influences and prevent dangerous propaganda against him by followers of Afaq Khoja. This clash between religious sects worked to Ismail Khan's advantage. However, the exiled Afaq Khoja had accomplished a diplomatic mission that had led to the collapse of Chagatai (Moghul) dynasty in 1678. In this diplomatic mission Tibet Muslims played a crucial role by convincing the 5th Dalai Lama to write a letter of introduction to the Dzungar Khanate. Using this recommendation letter Afaq Khoja allied with the Dzungars and formed a strong coalition force which included some Chagatai (Moghul) royal family members such as Abdirishit Khan II, Muhammad Imin Khan and Muhammad Momin Akbash, who were against Ismail Khan. Moreover, there were a significant numbers of followers of Afaq Khoja inside the Khanate so that the profile of the Afaq Khoja increased considerably. The Dzungar leader Galdan Boshugtu Khan then launched the Dzungar conquest of Altishahr, conquered the Yarkent Khanate and then installed Afaqi Khoja as one of their puppet rulers.

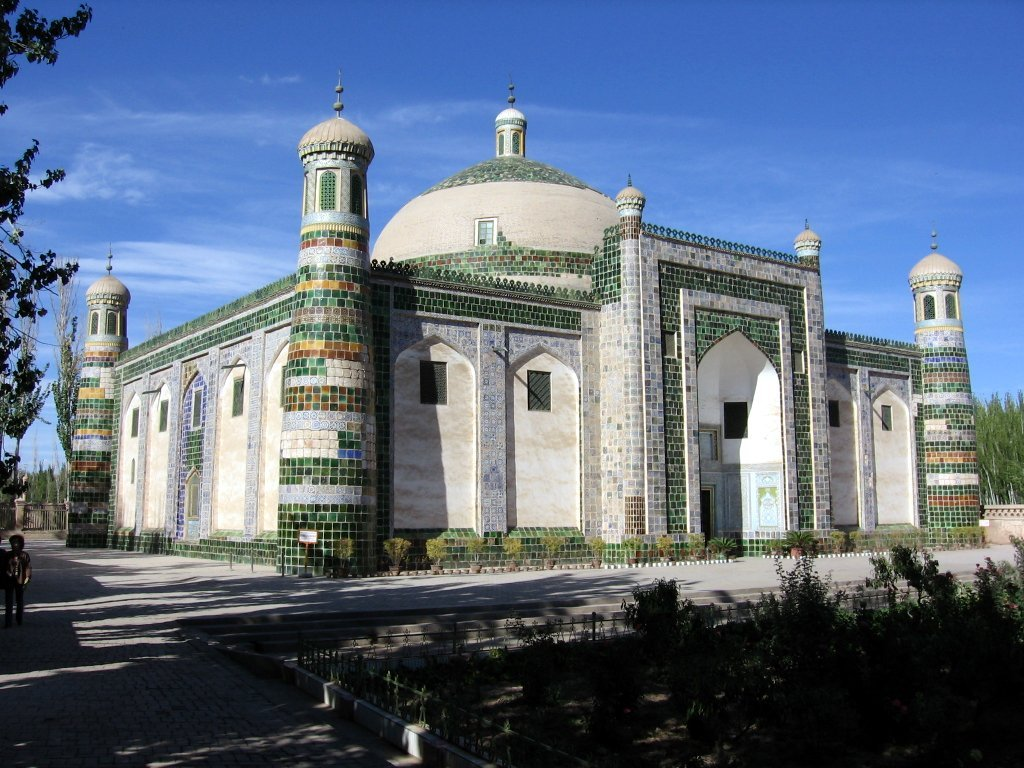
The entrance of Afaq Khoja Mausoleum

In 1691 a temporary alliance between Muhammad Imin Khan, son of Sultan Said Baba Khan, who was previously recalled from Turpan and elected as a Khan of the Yarkent Khanate on Kurultai of Kashgar and Yarkent Beks and who was a strong enemy of the Dzungars and Afak Khoja came to an end. Muhammad Imin Khan expelled Khoja from Yarkent and prohibited all inhabitants of Yarkand Khanate to keep any relations with Khoja. In response, Khoja swore to "exterminate all descendants of Chengiz Khan", called his son Yahiya Khoja from Kashgar with troops and attacked Yarkand. Muhammad Imin Khan retreated to Kargalik and from here to the place named Kulagan where a decisive battle took place in 1692 between armies of Khoja and Muhammad Imin Khan. During the battle many supporters of Muhammad Imin Khan deserted him and came to Khoja, that resulted in Khan's defeat. Muhammad Imin Khan fled to the Mountains where he was captured and killed.

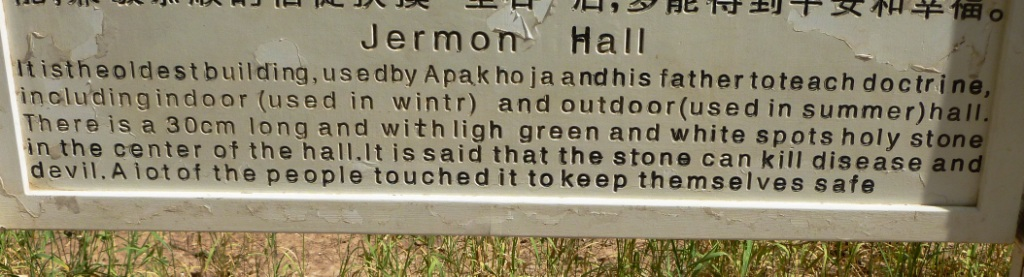
Jermon Hall sign in Kasghar

After this victory Afak Khoja declared his son Yahiya Khoja a Khan with the title Khan Khoja and made himself a powerful ruler controlling several cities around the Tarim Basin, including Khotan, Yarkand, Korla, Kucha and Aksu as well as Kashgar. According to sources from Ishaki khojas Afaq Khoja initially paid 100,000 tangas (silver coins) to the Dzungars for their military assistance and accepted the mandate of the Dzungars, led by Galdan Boshughtu Khan (1670–1697). Later the Dzungars demanded they pay them 100,000 tangas every year as tribute and this request was accepted by Afak Khoja.

Afak Khoja died in 1694 and left his son Yahiya Khoja as actual ruler of the Yarkand Khanate (r. 1694–1695). After Yahiya Khoja's death (he was killed by Apak Khoja's wife Khanam Padshah, who was a daughter of Sultan Said Baba Khan, ruler of Turpan and Chalish), Muhammad Mumin Sultan (Akbash Khan, r. 1695–1706) restored the Chagatay (Moghul) dynasty of Yarkand, attempting to get rid of the Dzungar mandate, but finally he fled to India. Kashgaria was soon reconquered by Dzungar Khan Tsewang Rabtan in 1713.

== Influence on Islam in China ==
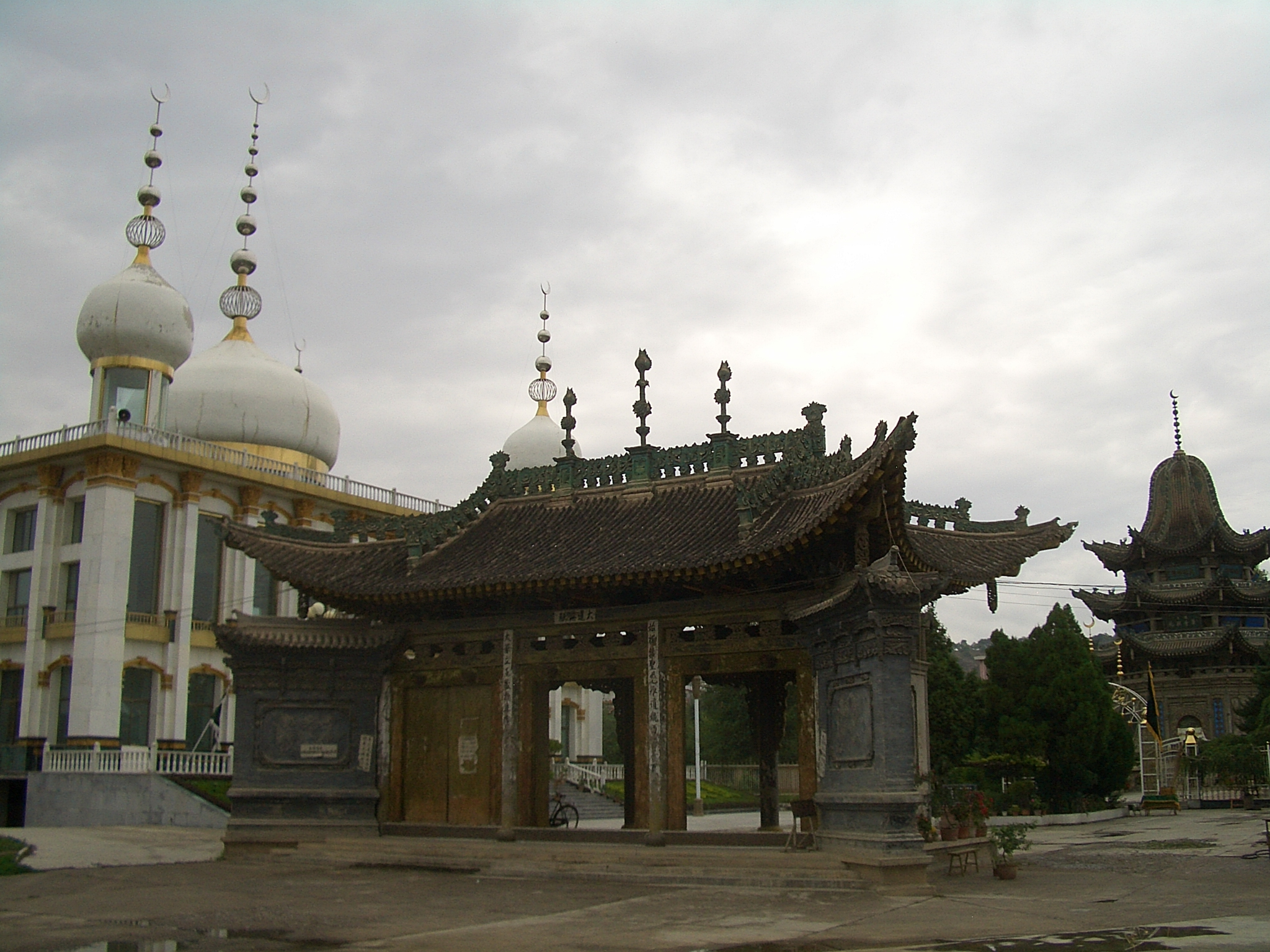
The shrine complex (gongbei) around the grave of Ma Laichi in Linxia City

Afaq Khoja's influence spread far outside of Xinjiang. From 1671-72, he was preaching in Gansu (which then included parts of modern Qinghai province), where his father Muhammad Yusuf had preached before. On that tour, he visited Xining (today's Qinghai province), Lintao, and Hezhou (now Linxia), and was said to convert some Hui and many Salars there to Naqshbandi Sufism.

According to the Chinese (Hui) followers of the Qadiriyya Sufi school, when Afāq Khoja was in Xining in 1672, he gave his blessing to 16-year-old Qi Jingyi (later also known as Hilal al-Din, or Qi Daozu (1656–1719)), who was then to introduce Qadiriyya into China proper. His two other spiritual descendants, Ma Laichi and Ma Mingxin, went to study in Central Asia and Arabia, and upon return to China founded two other Naqshbandi menhuans (brotherhoods) there: the Khufiyya and the Jahriyya, respectively.

== The Afaqis ==
Khoja Afaq's descendants, known as the Āfāqi khojas, or the Aq Taghliqs, i.e. 'White Mountaineers', played an important part in the local politics south of the Tian Shan range for almost two centuries after Afāq's death. They first ruled Kashgaria as Dzungars' vassals, but after the death of Dzungars' Galdan Khan managed to gain independence for a while.

The next strong Dzungar ruler, Tsewang Rabtan (1697–1727), subjugated Kashgaria again; to stay on the safe side, Dzungars this time were now to keep the Afaqi Khojas as hostages in the Ili region, and rule Kashgarian cities through Afaqis' rivals, the Ishaqi khojas -Karataghliks, i.e. 'Black Mountaineers'.

In the 1750s, two Afaqi Khoja descendants, the brothers Burhān al-Dīn (خواجہ برہان الدین) and Khwāja-i Jahān (خواجہ جهان ), had been held by Dzungars as hostages in Ili. They aided the Qianlong Emperor of the Manchu-led Qing Empire in campaign for annihilating the Dzungars: From spring 1755 till summer 1757, around 300,000 Dzungars, regardless of gender and age, were massacred by the invading 300,000-strong Qing army, which executed an official orders given to General Zhaohui by the Qianlong Emperor first to quell Dzungar's Rebellion in the spring of 1756 and then ( on a military council in Beijing on March 23, 1757) to liquidate the whole Dzungar nation till the last baby. Those who survived were killed by a smallpox epidemic. The total loss of the population in Dzungaria reached 1,000,000, transforming it eventually into the land without people. At the same time, Khoja Jahan, executing Khoja Burhan ad-Din's order, razed to ground in 1755 both Dzungar temples, Golden and Silver, in Ghulja and Kainuk cities of Ili River Valley, that were built by Galdan Boshugtu Khan and represented the sacred symbols of Dzungar Power. Establishing Qing hegemony over Dzungaria and the Tarim Basin they waged in 1755-1756 a bloody war against their old rivals, the Karataghliks, who previously took total control of Kashgaria since 1752 after successful anti-Dzungar revolt of Khoja Yusup (1752-1755), having terminated annual tribute payments to Dzungars. However, as the two eventually victorious khojas began to seek more independence for themselves, they soon (in autumn 1757) came into conflict with the Qing Empire. Having lost Yarkand and Kashgar to the Qing armies in 1759, they fled to Badakhshan, where they were promptly killed by the local ruler, Sultān Shāh, who sent their heads to the Qianlong Emperor.

According to a legend, Iparhan, granddaughter of Apak Khoja was given to the Qianlong Emperor as a concubine. Under Qing auspice, Khojijan rulers of city states often fell out of favor of the hegemonic power and had to flee to Uzbek protection in the Khanate of Kokand.

By the 19th century, prominent Afaqi Khojas (Khojijans) in exile in Kokand sought to influence their former domains through preaching or allying with new imperialist powers of Russia and Great Britain. It was during the 1800s that two major attempts were launched from Kokand to claim the "Six City State of Tarim Basin" ( Altı Shahr ) from Qing domination. These were the British-supported Jihangir Rebellion (1826–1828) and the usurpation of Kashgaria by Kokand retainer Yaqub Beg (1864–1877) who recognized Ottoman suzerainty.

Well into 20th century, there were still local princely families of Khojijan descent. The Chinese warlord and Military Governor (Duban) of Sinkiang general Sheng Shicai (April 12, 1933- August 29, 1944) restored the status of several of these local rulers to facilitate his rule.

The Qarataghliks (Black Mountaineers) propagated anti-Afaq Khoja literature. For his action of inviting Dzungar invasion and rule, Afaq Khoja is viewed as a perfidious betrayer collaborator by some Uyghur nationalists while he and his grave was still honored and revered as a saint by other Uyghurs. The power of miracles and the equivalent status of Jesus (Isa) in Islam have been attributed, according by some Uyghurs, to Appak Khoja.

== Afāq Khoja Mausoleum ==
"This was the famous shrine, and we were invited to step inside, where we saw a crowded mass of bluetiled tombs, that of the Saint-King being draped with red and white cloths. There were numbers of flags and banners before the tombs, and on one side was a palanquin in which a great-grandson of Apak had travelled to and from Peking. While there he had married his daughter to a Chinaman, and at the date of our visit a Celestial had arrived in Kashgar accompanied by a band of relatives, to demand his share of the great wealth of the shrine. His credentials were unexceptionable, and during a century and a half his ancestors had been given pensions by the Chinese Government; but owing to the revolution these subsidies had been stopped. Hence his appearance, which was causing much perturbation among the managers of the shrine funds." - Sir Percy Sykes and Ella Sykes. Sykes, Ella and Percy Sykes. pages 69-70 Through deserts and oases of Central Asia. London. Macmillan and Co. Limited, 1920.

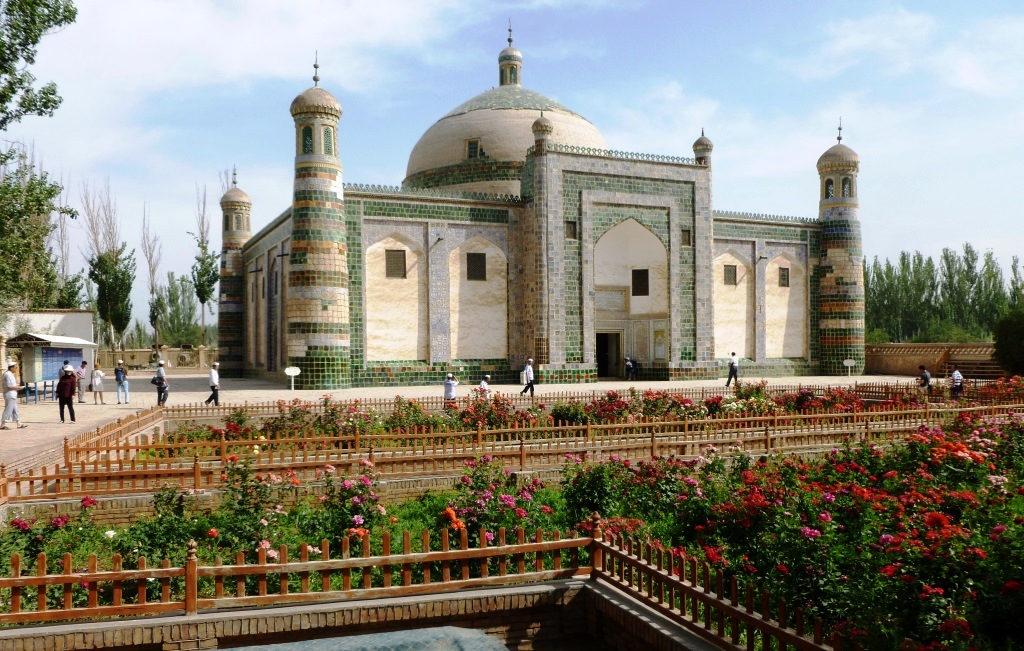
Afaq Khoja's tomb, Kashgar. Built 1639-1640

Afāq Khoja's mausoleum is considered the holiest Muslim site in Xinjiang. It is located at 39°29′26″N 76°1′23″E in Haohan Village (浩罕村), a northeastern suburb some 5 km from the city centre of Kashgar. First built ca. 1640, initially as Muhammad Yusuf tomb, the beautiful tiled mausoleum contains the tombs of five generations of the Afāqi family, providing resting places for its 72 members, both men and women.

== Literature ==
- Kim Hodong, "Holy War in China: The Muslim Rebellion and State in Chinese Central Asia, 1864-1877". Stanford University Press (March 2004). ISBN 0-8047-4884-5. (Searchable text available on Amazon.com)
- Gladney, Dru (1999). "The Salafiyya Movement in Northwest China: Islamic Fundamentalism among the Muslim Chinese?" Originally published in "Muslim Diversity: Local Islam in Global Contexts". Leif Manger, Ed. Surrey: Curzon Press. Nordic Institute of Asian Studies, No 26. Pp. 102–149
- Rian Thum, "Beyond resistance and nationalism: local history and the case of Afaq Khoja". Central Asian Survey, 31:3, 293-310 (October 2012).
