= Toluk, Kyrgyzstan =

Toluk
- Location within Kyrgyzstan
- Coordinates: 41°54′0″N 73°34′30″E
- Country: Kyrgyzstan
- Region: Jalal-Abad Region
- District: Toktogul District
- Elevation: 1,686 m (5,531 ft)

Population (2021)
  - Total: 1,304
- Time zone: UTC+6

Toluk is a village in Jalal-Abad Region of Kyrgyzstan. It is part of the Toktogul District. Its population was 1,304 in 2021.
