= Muhammad Ali Madali =

Uzbek revolutionary

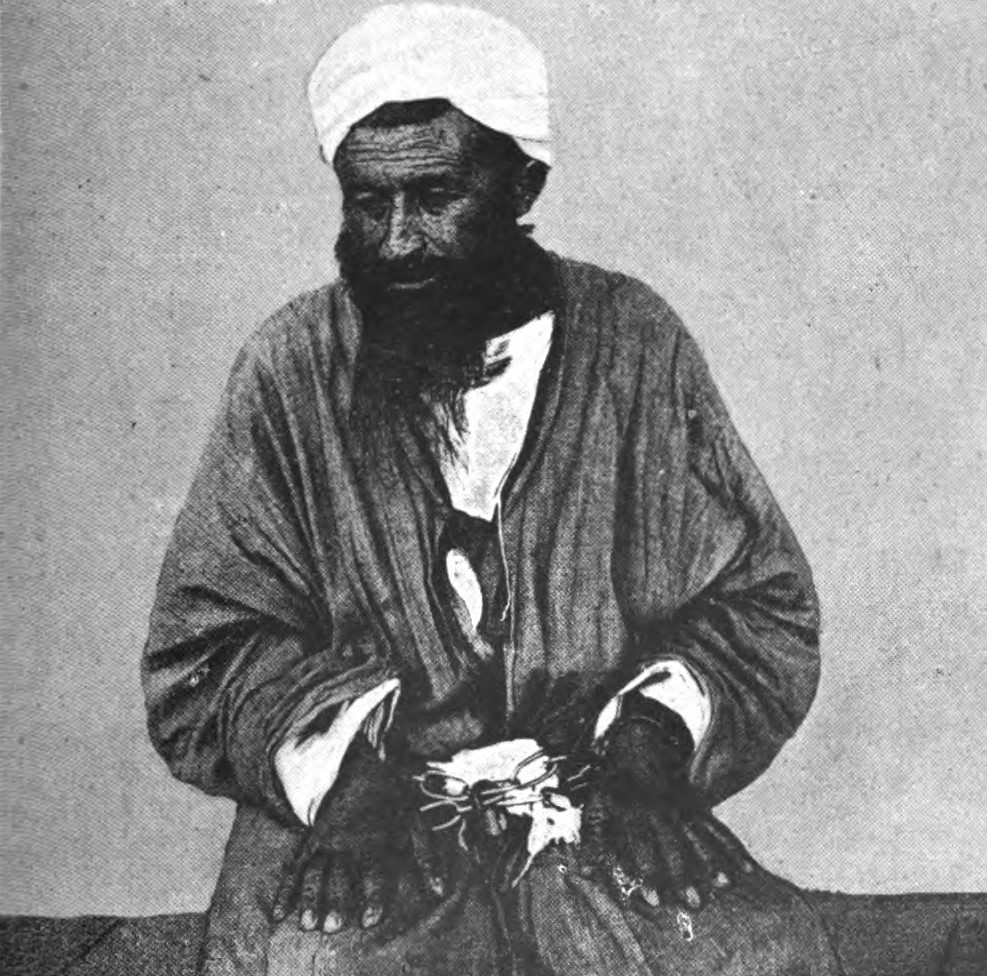
Dūkchī-Īshān

Muhammad Ali Madali (also known as Dukchi Eshon in Uzbek language or Iyikchi Eshen in Kyrgyz) was an īshān of the Naqshbandi Sufi order, who led an 1898 revolt against Russian domination, centred in the town of Andijan (in modern Uzbekistan).

Madali, seeking to rid the area of the Russians and restore the formerly independent khanate of Khokand, called for "holy war", and led 2,000 men against the Tsarist Russia. However, his force was blocked outside the city on Andijan by the Russian 20th Line Battalion and defeated. Of those 2,000, 546 were put on trial, and Madali and five of his lieutenants hanged.

Most of the people who were sentenced were Kyrgyz from the Ferghana Valley and the mountainous regions of Chatkal, Aksy, and Ketmen-Töbö, in what is now southern Kyrgyzstan. Among them was a prominent poet-improviser and composer Toktogul Satylganov (1864–1933), who was jailed by a false accusation by his political foes in the Ketmen-Tobe valley about his alleged participation in the revolt. He returned from a Siberian prison, in the village of Kuitun near the town of Irkutsk, in 1905.

== Outcome and interpretations ==
- The Czar recalled the regional governor, General Vrevskii and replaced him with General S. M. Dukhovskii. The rebellion was attributed to two major factors: stirring of Islamic feeling (allegedly encouraged by the Ottoman sultan), and a failure of the Russian government to take note of the situation.
- Later Soviet commentators declined to recognise the event as a popular movement, noting however that not only the disenfranchised elite, but also the working classes had been drawn to Madali's cause.

In the post-Soviet historiography in Central Asia, the Andijan revolt has been described as a progressive anti-Tsarist movement aimed to establish an independent state in the Ferghana Valley.
