= Ak-Jar, Jalal-Abad =

Ak-Jar
- Location within Kyrgyzstan
- Coordinates: 41°36′50″N 73°22′20″E
- Country: Kyrgyzstan
- Region: Jalal-Abad Region
- District: Toktogul District
- Elevation: 1,861 m (6,106 ft)

Population (2021)
  - Total: 1,109
- Time zone: UTC+6

Ak-Jar is a village in Jalal-Abad Region of Kyrgyzstan. It is part of the Toktogul District. Its population was 1,109 in 2021.
