= Bel-Aldy =

Bel-Aldy Бел-Алды
- Location within Kyrgyzstan
- Coordinates: 41°54′36″N 73°13′48″E
- Country: Kyrgyzstan
- Region: Jalal-Abad Region
- District: Toktogul District
- Elevation: 1,319 m (4,327 ft)

Population (2021)
  - Total: 1,448
- Time zone: UTC+6

Bel-Aldy is a village in Jalal-Abad Region of Kyrgyzstan. It is part of the Toktogul District. Its population was 1,448 in 2021.
