= Sary-Sögöt =

Sary-Sögöt Сары-Сөгөт
- Location within Kyrgyzstan
- Coordinates: 41°57′0″N 73°16′48″E
- Country: Kyrgyzstan
- Region: Jalal-Abad Region
- District: Toktogul District
- Elevation: 1,508 m (4,948 ft)

Population (2021)
  - Total: 2,671
- Time zone: UTC+6

Sary-Sögöt is a village in Jalal-Abad Region of Kyrgyzstan. It is part of the Toktogul District. Its population was 2,671 in 2021.
