= Balykty (Jalal-Abad Region) =

Balykty Балыкты
- Location within Kyrgyzstan
- Coordinates: 41°58′48″N 72°34′48″E
- Country: Kyrgyzstan
- Region: Jalal-Abad Region
- District: Toktogul District
- Elevation: 1,508 m (4,948 ft)

Population (2021)
  - Total: 56
- Time zone: UTC+6

Balykty is a village in Jalal-Abad Region of Kyrgyzstan. It is part of the Toktogul District. Its population was 56 in 2021.
