= Kara-Künggöy, Jalal-Abad =

Kara-Künggöy Кара-Күңгөй
- Location within Kyrgyzstan
- Coordinates: 41°59′40″N 72°28′50″E
- Country: Kyrgyzstan
- Region: Jalal-Abad
- District: Toktogul

Population (2021)
  - Total: 1,703
- Time zone: UTC+6

Kara-Künggöy (Kyrgyz: Кара-Күңгөй) is a village in Jalal-Abad Region of Kyrgyzstan. It is part of the Toktogul District. Its population was 1,703 in 2021.
