= State Prizes of the Soviet Republics =

Award granted by a USSR subsidiary

The State Prizes of the Soviet Republics were each republic counterpart to the USSR State Prize. Each republic granted several different prizes, generally named after writers or artists from the republic, as well as a blanket Komsomol prize for young artists.

== Republics ==
- Russian SFSR
  - Maxim Gorky (literature)
  - Konstantin Stanislavski (theatre)
  - Mikhail Glinka (music)
  - Vasili Bazhenov (architecture)
  - Ilya Repin (fine arts)
  - Brothers Vasilyev (cinema)
  - Nadezhda Krupskaya (art and literature for children)
- Ukrainian SSR
  - Taras Shevchenko
  - Pavlo Tychyna
  - Maksym Rylsky
  - Lesya Ukrainka
  - Nikolai Ostrovsky
- Belarusian SSR
  - Yanka Kupala (literature)
  - Yakub Kolas
  - Panteleymon Lepeshinsky
- Uzbek SSR
  - Alisher Navoiy
- Kazakh SSR
  - Abay Qunanbayuli (literature)
  - Kurmangazy (music)
  - Kulyash Baiseitova
- Georgian SSR
  - Shota Rustaveli
- Azerbaijan SSR:
  - Mirza Akhundov (literature)
  - Uzeyir Hajibeyov (music)
- Lithuanian SSR
  - Žemaitė (literature)
  - Pranas Zibertas
- Moldavian SSR
  - Boris Glavan
  - Sergiu Rădăuțanu
- Latvian SSR
  - Eduards Veidenbaums (literature)
  - Mirdza Ķempe
- Kyrgyz SSR
  - Toktogul Satylganov
  - Mayramkan Abylkasymova
- Tajik SSR
  - Rudaki
- Armenian SSR
  - Aram Khatchaturian (music)
  - A. Danielyan
- Turkmen SSR
  - Makhtumkuli
- Estonian SSR
  - Juhan Smuul (literature)

== ASSRs ==
The Autonomous Republics (ASSRs) also had their state prizes; a sample:

- Abkhaz ASSR
  - Darmit Gulia
- Bashkir ASSR
  - Salawat Yulayev
- Chuvash ASSR
  - Konstantin Ivanov
- Dagestan ASSR
  - Suleiman Stalsky
- Kalmyk ASSR
  - Oka Gorodovikov
- Karakalpak ASSR
  - Berdakh
- Karelian ASSR
  - Arhippa Perttunen
- Komi ASSR
  - Ivan Kuratov
  - Viktor Savin
- Mari ASSR
  - Sergei Chavain
- Tatar ASSR
  - Ğabdulla Tuqay
- Yakut ASSR
  - Platon Oyunsky

== See also ==
- Awards and decorations of the Soviet Union
