= Akchi =

Place in Pavlodar Province, Kazakhstan

Coordinates: 50°43′27.01″N 74°11′23.46″E

Akchi, also spelled Akchiy, is a populated place in Kazakhstan. It has a small population and is in Pavlodar Region. Relatively nearby towns include Akhmat, Kyzyltash, Uzunbulak and Uzynbulaq. Astana, Karaganda, Pavlodar, Semey and Omsk are the closest big cities. Akchi is located north of Lake Balkhash.

Akchi was the site of mercury and arsenic testing, along with Aralsk.
