= Ak-Tektir =

Ak-Tektir Ак-Тектир
- Location within Kyrgyzstan
- Coordinates: 41°57′50″N 72°30′50″E
- Country: Kyrgyzstan
- Region: Jalal-Abad Region
- District: Toktogul District

Population (2021)
  - Total: 2,618
- Time zone: UTC+6

Ak-Tektir is a village in Jalal-Abad Region of Kyrgyzstan. It is part of the Toktogul District. Its population was 2,618 in 2021.
