= Muhammad Yusuf Khoja =

17th-century Naqshbandi Sufi leader

Muhammad Yusuf Khoja (محمد یوسف خواجه ; modern Uyghur: مۇھەممەد يۈسۈپ خوجا; Chinese: 瑪木特玉素布) was a seventeenth-century Naqshbandi Sufi leader. Born in the village of Dahbīd in Samarqand, he was the father of Afaq Khoja (Hidāyat Allāh), a religious and political leader adorned with the title Khwaja/Khoja (master, descendant of a Naqshbandi leader).

== The Baishan School ==
Muhammad Yusuf Khoja belonged to the Baishan or White Mountain school (白山派 báishān pài in Chinese, aqtaghliq in Turkic, آفاقية āfāqiyya in Arabic), sometimes referred to as the "White Mountain Khojas," a subset of the larger Naqshbandi order. The Baishan school developed in the 18th century and is also referred to as "White Hat School" and "White Hat Huizi” (白帽回子). This school of thought developed after the death of Ahmad Kasani when some Sufis followed the Great Master's older son (Ishan-i-Kalan). They were called the White Mountain Sufis (or White Mountaineers) and the supporters of Ahmad Kasani's younger son Ishaq were called the Black Mountain school (黑山派 hēishān pài in Chinese, qarataghliq in Turkic, إسحاقية isḥāqiyya in Arabic).

== Genealogy ==
Muhammad Yusuf Khoja’s grandfather was Ahmad Kasani (1461–1542), a notable Naqshbandi leader sometimes referred to as the Great Master. Some Khojas in Central Asia were said to be Sayyids, descendants of Muhammad. However, the majority of the inhabitants of Bukhara and Samarkand were Tajiks. Many Khojas were appointed to administrative positions by Mongol leaders in what is now present day Xinjiang, China, historically known as Altishahr. Ahmad Kasani himself never visited the Altishahr region but his descendants, Muhammad Yusuf among them, were involved in the area.

“The saint's sons settled at Kashgar, where their father had married a wife and had received rich estates, and gradually established a theocracy, laying upon the necks of the submissive, apathetic people a heavy yoke which they still bear. In course of time two parties were formed whose influence on the subsequent history of the country has been profound. The supporters of the elder son were termed Ak Taulin or "White Mountaineers", from the name of the range behind Artush, their headquarters, whereas the supporters of the younger were known as Kara Taulin or "Black Mountaineers", from the hills near Khan Arik. Both parties of Khojas. as they were termed, aimed at political supremacy and intrigued with any external power that appeared likely to favour their ambitions. — Sir Percy Sykes and Ella Sykes.

Muhammad Yusuf Khoja’s wife Zuleiha Begum was from the village of Bashkerim in Kashgar. Her father was a wealthy property owner from Bashkerim. The two started a family when their son Afaq Khoja (Hidāyat Allāh) was born in 1626 in Kumul.

== Preaching in Kumul ==
While in Kumul, Muhammad Yusuf Khoja was a preacher. The primary Sufi order in the Kumul area at the time was the Black Mountain school, founded by Ahmad Kasani's younger son Ishaq. The presence of the Black Mountain Khojas (sometimes also referred to as the Black Hat school) made it challenging for the White Mountain school to gain a foothold in the area. So, Muhammad Yusuf Khoja moved to Hami in the eastern Khanate.

When Afaq Khoja was 12, they moved to Kashgar. It was here that Muhammad Yusuf Khoja was able to generate a following for the Baishan school. While in Kashgar, the Baishan school was able to establish itself but still faced political struggles with the Qing dynasty and religious conflict with the opposing Black Mountain school.

== Conflict in Yarkand ==
After the death of a Black Mountain Khoja leader in Yarkand, Muhammad Yusuf Khoja moved to the area in attempts to gain followers and preach. After attempting to persuade some Black Mountain Khojas to give up their faith and join the White Mountain Khojas he was met with fierce opposition by their community. This forced him to leave Yarkand and return to Kashgar, but he suddenly died before returning. Many White Mountain Khojas (Baishan) believe that he was poisoned by the Black Mountain school. This created more animosity between the two factions and led to political conflict between Kashgar and Yarkand.
