= Uzynbulaq =

- Village
- Location in Kazakhstan
- Coordinates: 43°09′32″N 79°00′38″E
- Country: Kazakhstan
- Region: Almaty Region
- Time zone: UTC+6 (Omsk Time)

Uzynbulaq is a village in Almaty Region, in south-eastern Kazakhstan.
