= Toktogul =

Toktogul Toктогул
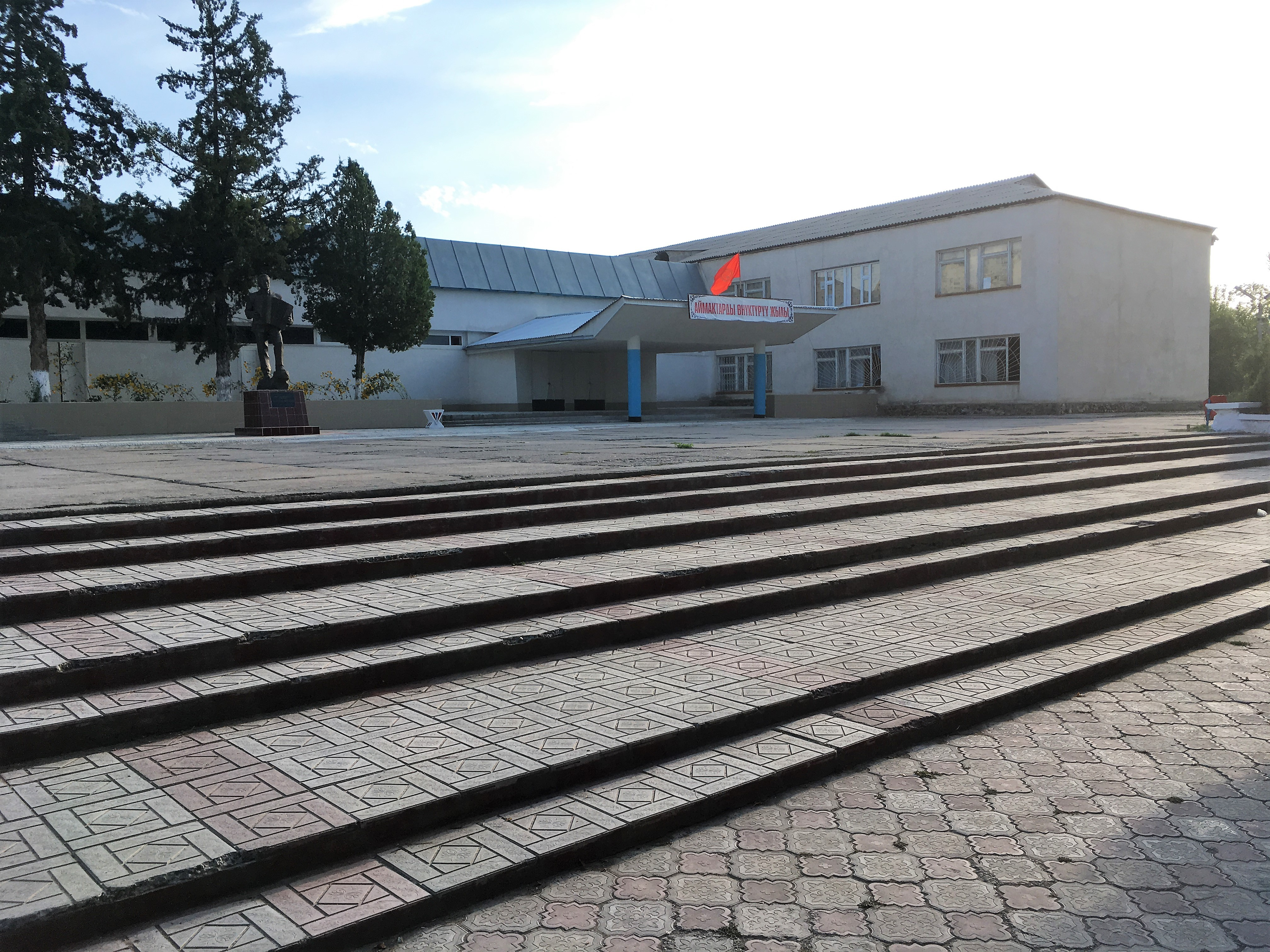

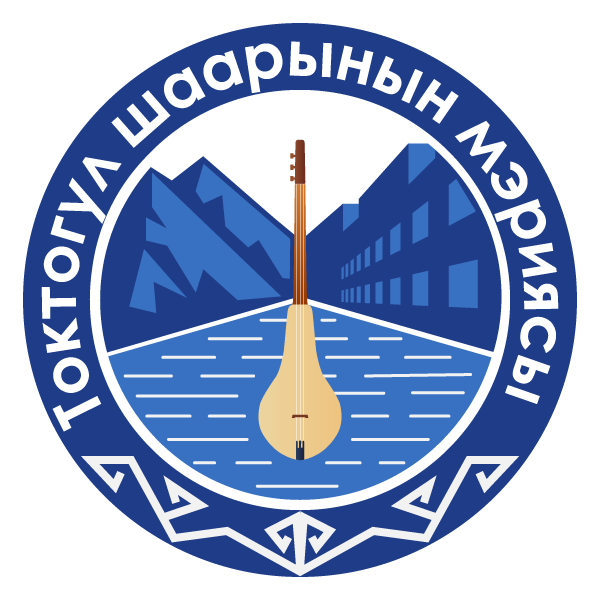
- Seal

- Location in Kyrgyzstan
- Coordinates: 41°52′20″N 72°56′20″E
- Country: Kyrgyzstan
- Region: Jalal-Abad Region
- District: Toktogul District

Population (2021)
  - Total: 20,577
- Postal code: 715400

Toktogul (Kyrgyz: Toктогул, known until 31 July 1957 as Muztör (Kyrgyz: Музтөр)), is a city (since 2012) in Jalal-Abad Region of Kyrgyzstan. Its population was 20,577 in 2021. It is the administrative seat of Toktogul District.

It is named after its most famous son: the poet and musician Toktogul Satilganov. Toktogul was born in Kushchusu, a village now submerged in the Toktogul Reservoir. It is located on the northern shore of the Toktogul reservoir. To the south, highway M41 curves around the eastern end of the reservoir toward Karaköl and Jalal-Abad city. To the north the road goes up the Chychkan valley into Talas Region on its way to Bishkek.

== Population ==
Historical population
Year	Pop.	±% p.a.
1970	8,851	—
1979	12,391	+3.81%
1989	16,381	+2.83%
1999	16,101	−0.17%
2009	16,429	+0.20%
2021	20,577	+1.89%
Note: resident population; Sources:

== Climate ==
Climate data for Toktogul (1991–2020)
Month	Jan	Feb	Mar	Apr	May	Jun	Jul	Aug	Sep	Oct	Nov	Dec	Year
Daily mean °C (°F)	−4.8 (23.4)	−2.5 (27.5)	5.4 (41.7)	13.3 (55.9)	17.5 (63.5)	21.0 (69.8)	24.0 (75.2)	24.1 (75.4)	19.8 (67.6)	12.4 (54.3)	5.6 (42.1)	−1.5 (29.3)	11.2 (52.2)
Source: NOAA
