= Almaluu, Kemin =

Almaluu Алмалуу
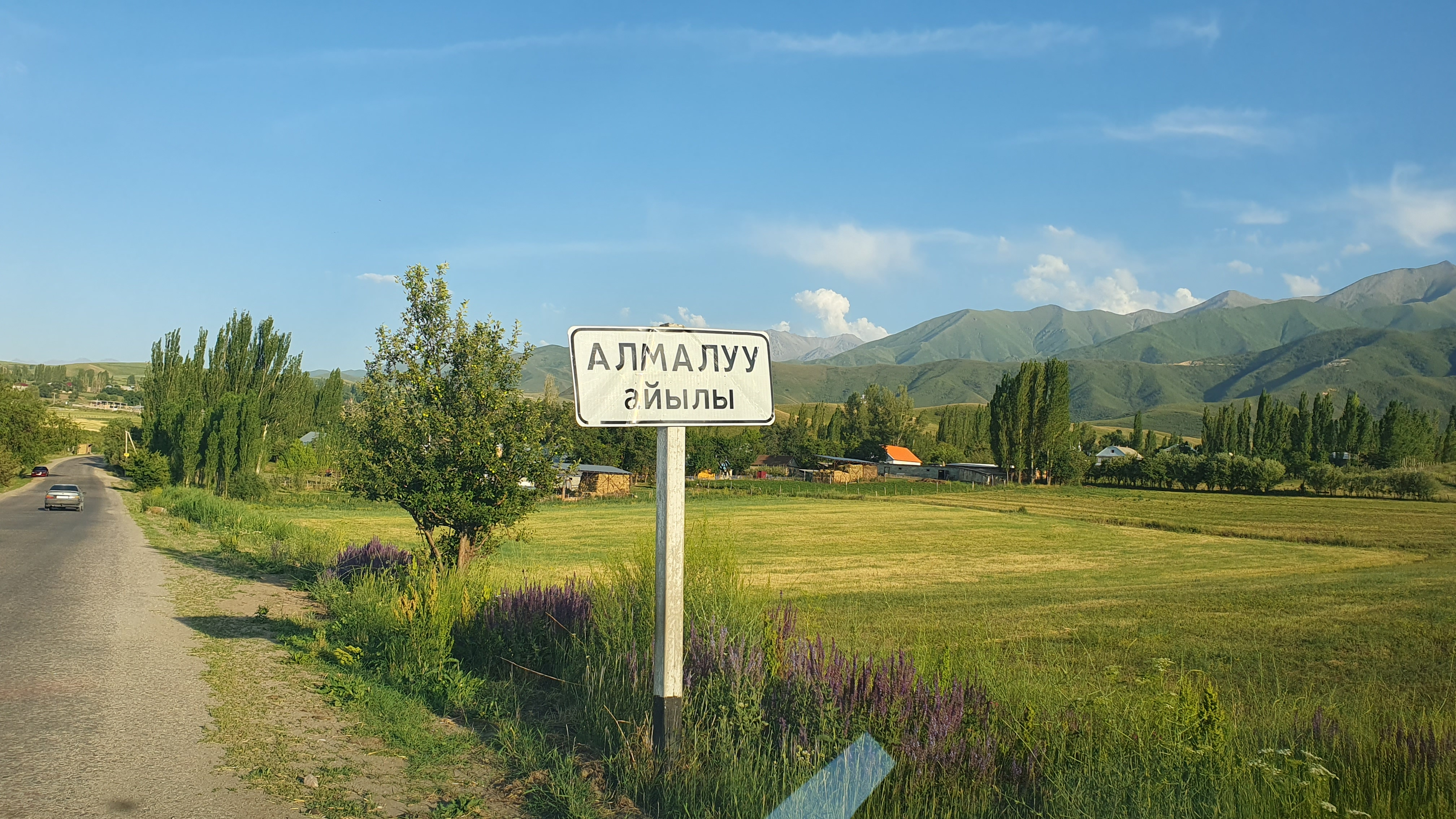
- Almaluu village

- Location within Kyrgyzstan
- Coordinates: 42°43′20″N 75°30′44″E
- Country: Kyrgyzstan
- Region: Chüy Region
- District: Kemin District
- Elevation: 1,115 m (3,658 ft)

Population (2021)
  - Total: 810
- Time zone: UTC+6

Almaluu (Kyrgyz: Алмалуу, also Алмалы - Almaly) is a village in the Kemin District of the Chüy Region of Kyrgyzstan. Its population was 810 in 2021.

== Notable people ==
- Mayramkan Abylkasymova, poet
