= Almaluu =

Almaluu Алмалуу
- Location within Kyrgyzstan
- Coordinates: 41°55′48″N 73°30′36″E
- Country: Kyrgyzstan
- Region: Jalal-Abad
- District: Toktogul
- Elevation: 2,033 m (6,670 ft)

Population (2021)
  - Total: 1,295
- Time zone: UTC+6

Almaluu (Kyrgyz: Алмалуу) is a village in Jalal-Abad Region of Kyrgyzstan. It is part of the Toktogul District. Its population was 1,295 in 2021.
