= Kara-Suu, Toktogul =

Kara-Suu Кара-Суу
- Location in Kyrgyzstan
- Coordinates: 41°51′30″N 72°55′30″E
- Country: Kyrgyzstan
- Region: Jalal-Abad Region
- District: Toktogul District

Population (2021)
  - Total: 1,770
- Time zone: UTC+6 (KGT)

Kara-Suu is a village in Toktogul District, Jalal-Abad Region of Kyrgyzstan. Its population was 1,770 in 2021.
