= Toktogul Satylganov =

Kyrgyz poet and singer (1864–1933)

- توقتوعۇل ساتىلعان ۇۇلۇ
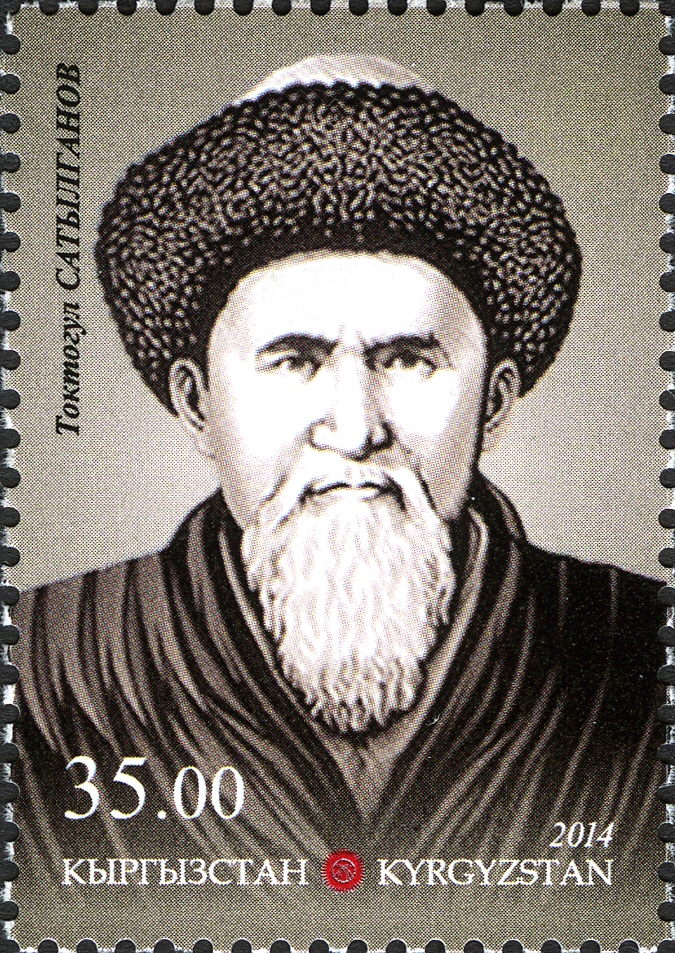
- Satylganov on a 2014 stamp of Kyrgyzstan
- Born: Toktogul Satylganov; 25 October 1864; Kushchusu, Khanate of Kokand
- Died: 17 February 1933 (aged 68); Sasyk-dzhiide, Kirghiz ASSR, Soviet Union

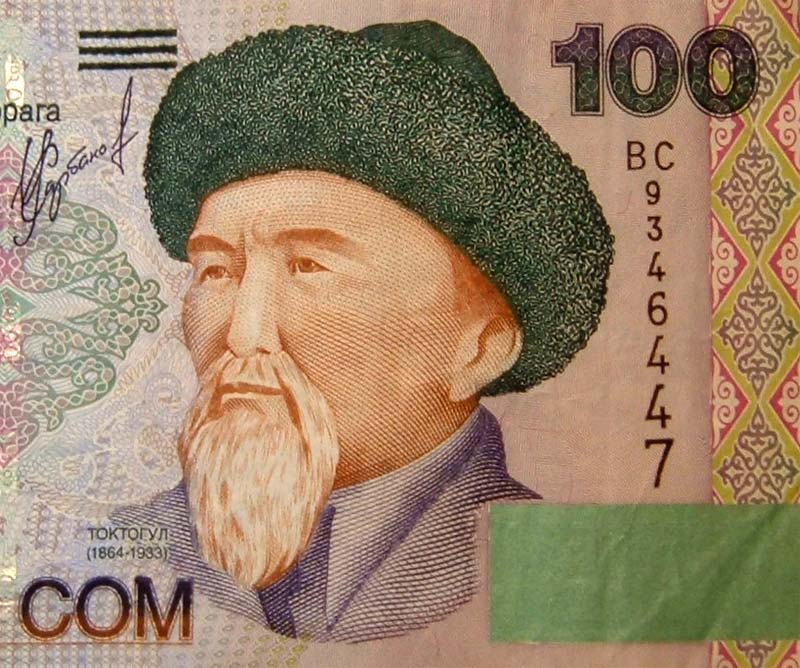
Satylganov on the Kyrgyz 100 som note.

Toktogul Satylganov (Note: Kyrgyz: Токтогул Сатылган уулу, romanized: Toktogul Satylgan uulu, arabized: توقتوعۇل ساتىلعان ۇۇلۇ, pronounced [tʰoqtʰoʁʊ́ɫ sɑtʰɯ̆ɫʁɑ́n uːɫʊ́]; Russian: Токтогул Сатылганов, romanized: Toktogul Satylganov, pronounced [tɐktɐˈɡul sətɨlˈganəf]) (25 October 1864 – 17 February 1933) was a Kyrgyz akyn. The Kyrgyz town of Toktogul in the Jalal-Abad Region is named in his honour. Toktogul was born in Kushchusu, a village now submerged in the Toktogul Reservoir.

== Career ==
Toktogul was a well-known poet and composer with democratic views even during the Tsarist Russia's colonial era in Southern Kyrgyzstan (1876–1917).

On the eve of the revolt led by Muhammad Ali Madali, the Sufi ishan, Toktogul was harshly criticizing local Kyrgyz lords in Ketmen-Tobe valley.

Madali ishan, seeking to rid the area of the Russians and restore the formerly independent khanate of Khokand, called for "holy war", and led 2,000 men against Tsarist Russia on 17–18 May 1898 (30–31 May 1898 in the Gregorian calendar). However, his force was blocked outside the city on Andijan by the Russian 20th Line Battalion and defeated. Of those 2,000, 546 were put on trial, and Madali and five of his lieutenants hanged.

Most of the sentenced people were Kyrgyz people in the Ferghana valley and mountainous areas in Chatkal, Aksy and Ketmen-Tobe in what is now southern Kyrgyzstan. Among them was prominent poet-improviser and composer Toktogul, who was jailed by a false accusation by his political foes in the Ketmen-Tobe valley about his alleged participation in the revolt. He returned from Siberia jail (in the village of Kuitun near the town of Irkutsk) in 1905.

His fame reached a high point in the Soviet era when his works were promoted by the state as a musician of the people and he was known throughout Kyrgyzstan simply as "Toktogul". This distinction was founded largely on his works in the pre-revolutionary era which were interpreted as reflecting the class struggle. Modern interpretations, however, suggest that they had more to do with clan rivalries. Despite this, he welcomed the revolution, writing "What woman gave a birth to such a person like Lenin?" in celebration. Even after the fall of the Soviet Union Toktogul's songs remain popular among Kyrgyz performers, and many streets, parks, schools, and even his home town are named after him.
