= Toktogul Dam =

Dam in Toktogul, Kyrgyzstan

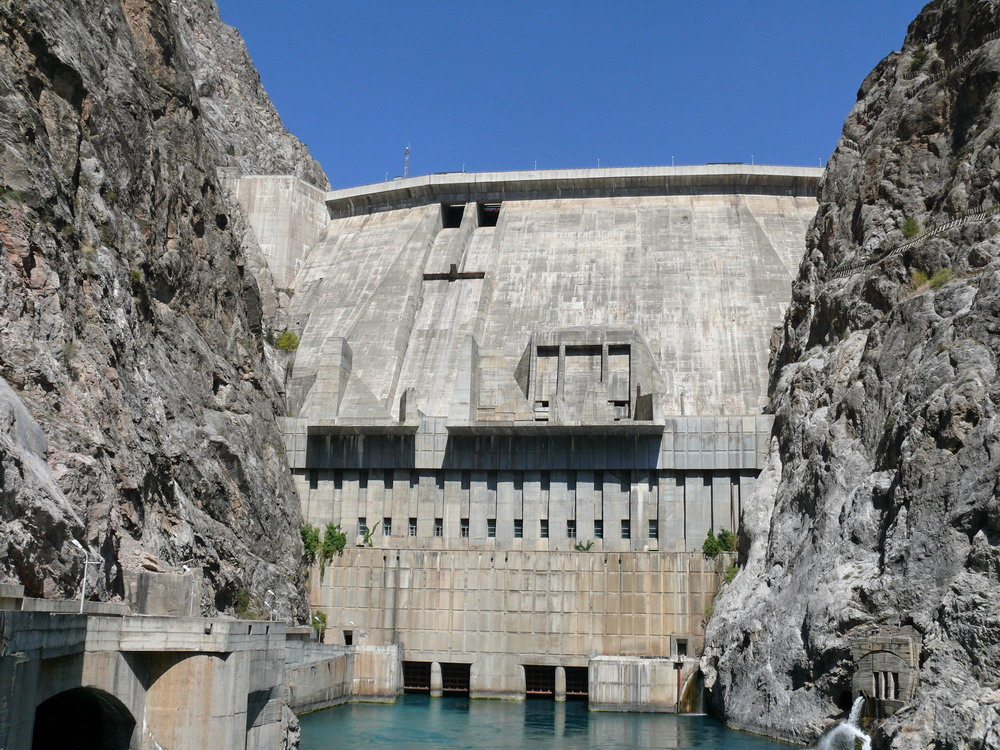
- The hydroelectric dam fed by Toqtogul Reservoir
- Interactive map of Toktogul Dam
- Country: Kyrgyzstan
- Location: Toktogul
- Coordinates: 41.65707°N 72.63611°E
- Construction began: 1960
- Opening date: 1976

Dam and spillways
- Type of dam: Gravity dam
- Impounds: Naryn River
- Height: 215 m (705 ft)
- Length: 292.5 m (960 ft)
- Spillway capacity: 245 m^{3}/s (8,700 cu ft/s)

Reservoir
- Creates: Toktogul Reservoir
- Total capacity: 19.5 km^{3} (15,800,000 acre⋅ft)
- Active capacity: 14 km^{3} (11,000,000 acre⋅ft)
- Surface area: 284.3 km^{2} (109.8 sq mi)
- Maximum length: 65 km (40 mi)
- Maximum water depth: 120 m (390 ft)

Power Station
- Commission date: 1978
- Turbines: 4 X 360 MW
- Installed capacity: 1,440 MW
- Annual generation: 4,400 GWh
- Website http://www.energo-es.kg/ru/o-kompanii/filialy/kaskad-toktogulskikh-ges/

Toktogul Dam is a hydroelectric and irrigation dam on the Naryn River in the Jalal-Abad Province of Kyrgyzstan. It is a concrete gravity dam with height of 215 metres (705 ft) and length of 292.5 metres (960 ft). It is a part of the Naryn-Syr Darya cascade. It is named after Toktogul Satilganov.

The Toktogul Hydroelectric Station has an installed capacity of 1,260 MW, which makes it the largest power plant in the country. It has four turbines.

Toktogul Reservoir (Kyrgyz: Токтогул суу сактагычы, Kyrgyz pronunciation: [toqtoʁul suː sɑqtɑʁɯtʃɯ]; Russian: Токтогульское водохранилище) is the largest of the reservoirs on the path of the Naryn River, a northern tributary of the Syr Darya. The reservoir has total capacity of 19.5 cubic kilometres (15,800,000 acre⋅ft), of which 14 cubic kilometres (11,000,000 acre⋅ft) is active capacity. Its length is 65 kilometres (40 mi) and its surface area is 284.3 square kilometres (109.8 sq mi). The maximal depth of the reservoir is 120 metres (390 ft).

The city of Kara-Köl, south of the reservoir (downstream from its dam) housed the dam construction workers, and currently is home to the hydro power plant staff. The city of Toktogul is located north of the reservoir.

== Environmental and Social Impact ==
The reservoir was created in 1976 after construction works on the dam were completed and the Ketmen-Töbö Valley was flooded. The reservoir flooded more than 26 thousand hectares of land, of which 21.2 thousand hectares of agricultural land, 26 communities including large settlement Toktogul were displaced and the main road through the region was re-routed. Archaeologists excavated barrows from Saka times before the sites were lost.

== 2009 crisis ==
Toktogul Reservoir had a critically low water level in 2009. A cold dry winter, combined with water sales to foreign countries as well as increased domestic demand left the reservoir at a fraction of its capacity. Electrical rationing had to be employed throughout the entire country with outages lasting up to 11 hours every day.
