= List of villages in Kyrgyzstan =

Kyrgyzstan has few cities but a large number of villages spread across the country's 7 regions and many districts. Below is a list of villages of Kyrtgyzstan as well as the regions in which they are found.

== Villages ==
Name	Region
Achy	Jalal-Abad
Ak-Bulung	Issyk-Kul
Ak-Döbö	Talas
Ak-Jar	Osh
Ak-Kuduk	Naryn
Ak-Terek	Issyk-Kul
Ak-Terek	Osh
Ak-Turpak	Batken
Alim-Tepe	Osh
Amanbaev	Talas
Aral	Jalal-Abad
Avletim	Jalal-Abad
Bakay-Ata	Talas
Baktuu-Dolonotu	Issyk-Kul
Boo-Terek	Talas
Bosteri	Issyk-Kul
Börü	Osh
Buyga	Osh
Chat	Jalal-Abad
Chong-Sary-Oy	Issyk-Kul
Chym-Korgon	Chüy
Jyly-Suu	Osh
Kalba	Talas
Kara-Bulak	Osh
Kara-Kochkor	Osh
Kök-Say	Talas
Kolot	Jalal-Abad
Köpürö-Bazar	Talas
Kozuchak	Talas
Kyrgyz-Chek	Osh
Kyzyl-Adyr	Talas
Kyzyl-Korgon	Osh
Manas	Talas
Nura	Osh
Nyldy	Talas
Oktyabr	Jalal-Abad
Oktyabr	Osh
Pokrovka	Talas
Rot-Front	Chüy
Semyonovka	Issyk-Kul
Sheker	Talas
Sopu-Korgon	Osh
Taldy-Bulak	Talas
Üch-Korgon	Batken
Yntymak	Talas
