= Kyrgyzstan Germans =

Ethnic group in Kyrgyzstan

Total population
- 7,886 (2022)

Regions with significant populations
- Kyrgyzstan, Talas, Bergtal, Chüy Valley

Religion
- Christianity

There is a small population of around 8,000 Germans in Kyrgyzstan. They make up about 0.1% of the total population of the country.

== Migration history ==
During the 1800s, groups of Mennonites from Germany settled throughout the Russian Empire. They began to come to the territory which is today Kyrgyzstan in the late 19th century. Many other Germans were brought to the country forcibly, as part of the Stalin-era internal deportations. The 1979 Soviet census showed 101,057 Germans in the Kirghiz Soviet Socialist Republic (2.9% of the population), while the 1989 census showed 101,309 (2.4%).

After Kyrgyzstan gained independence in 1991, there was a significant outflow of ethnic Germans to Germany, due to the relatively liberal German nationality law which granted citizenship to anyone with proof of German ancestry. A 1993 survey found that 85% of the Germans in Kyrgyzstan intended to emigrate; among those, the most popular destination by far was Germany (80%), with Russia running a distant second at 6%. By the time of Kyrgyzstan's 1999 census, just 21,471 (0.4% of the population) remained. German diplomatic officials in Kyrgyzstan were quoted in 2009 as stating that number has declined even further over the following decade, to perhaps just 10,000. This was supported by the 2009 census, which found just 9,487 Germans remaining (0.18% of the population). However, there are signs that the exodus may be coming to an end. Facing difficulties integrating Russian-speaking Germans from the former Soviet Union, the German government tightened their immigration requirements; furthermore, most ethnic Germans who hope to leave Kyrgyzstan have already done so. In 2007, only 196 Germans in Kyrgyzstan were granted immigration permits by the German embassy; that number fell further to 111 in 2008. As of 2022, there were 7,886 Germans in Kyrgyzstan.

== Geographical distribution ==
The first German settlements in Kyrgyzstan were near Talas: Nikolaipol, Keppental, Gnadental, Orlovka and Dmitrovskoye. In the late 1920s, they moved towards the Chüy Valley, in the vicinity of Frunze (now Bishkek), where they established a number of new village-suburbs, including Bergtal (Rotfront), Fridenfeld, and Luxemburg. Others lived in Kant and Tokmok. However, in the exodus of the 1990s, the German villages emptied out, and there are no longer any compact settlements of Germans in the country.

== Language ==
The ethnic Germans of Kyrgyzstan tend to trace their roots to western parts of Germany near the border with the Netherlands. As such, they tend to speak varieties of Low German. However, many youth show language shift towards Russian, which they use for communicating with peers of other ethnicities. There is a Bishkek branch of the Goethe-Institut, which promotes German culture and the teaching of the German language; the local head of the Institut is herself an ethnic German born in Kyrgyzstan, who emigrated with her parents in 1978 but then returned to the country nearly three decades later to take up her present post. However, the study of the German language as a second language has been losing popularity even among ethnic German youth, as Chinese and English become of greater economic importance instead.

== Organisations ==
In the southern city of Jalal-Abad, local ethnic Germans formed the Hope German Cultural Center in 1996. Four Congresses of German Youth of Kyrgyzstan (съезд немецкой молодежи Киргизии) have been held in the country; however, the most recent, in 2010, attracted only 50 participants. The government of Germany provides some monetary support to German organisations in Kyrgyzstan.

== Notable people ==
- Alexander Otto (born 1988, in Orlovka), footballer
- Athanasius Schneider (born 1961, in Tokmok), Roman Catholic bishop
- Dennis Wolf (born 1978, in Tokmok), bodybuilder
- Edgar Bernhardt (born 1986, in Novopavlovka), footballer
- Edita Schaufler (born 1980, in Bishkek), former rhythmic gymnast
- Konstantin Schneider (born 1975, in Bishkek), former wrestler
- Kristina Vogel (born 1990, in Bishkek), former track cyclist
- Lilli Schwarzkopf (born 1983, in Novopokrovka), heptathlete
- Viktor Maier (born 1990, in Kant), footballer
- Vitalij Lux (born 1989, in Kara-Balta), footballer

== Sources ==
- Eisfeld, A. (1993), "Zwischen Bleiben und Gehen: Die Deutschen in den Nachfolgestaaten der Sowjetunion", Aus Politik und Zeitgeschichte (48): 44–52
