= Sary-Bulak =

Sary-Bulak or Sarybulak may refer to the following places:

- in Kyrgyzstan:
  - Sary-Bulak, Chuy, a village in Jayyl District, Chuy Region
  - Sary-Bulak, Jalal-Abad, a village in Suzak District, Jalal-Abad Region
  - Sary-Bulak, Naryn, a village in Kochkor District, Naryn Region
  - Sary-Bulak, Aravan, a village in Aravan District, Osh Region
  - Sary-Bulak, Chong-Alay, a village in Chong-Alay District, Osh Region
  - Sary-Bulak, Kara-Kulja, a village in Sary-Bulak rural community, Kara-Kulja District, Osh Region
  - Sary-Bulak, Kara-Kochkor, a village in Kara-Kochkor rural community, Kara-Kulja District, Osh Region
  - Sary-Bulak, Talas, a village in Manas District, Talas Region
  - the former name of Balbay, a village in Tüp District, Issyk-Kul Region
- Sarybulak, Almaty, a village in the city Kapchagay, Almaty Region, Kazakhstan
- Sarıbulaq, a village in Balakan District, Azerbaijan
