= Aghkilisa =

Aghkilisa, Aghk’ilisa, Agkilisa, Akhkilisa, or Aghkilisa may refer to:

- Aghkilisa, Ararat, Armenia
- Azat, Armenia
- Chermakavan, Armenia
- Krashen, Armenia
- Ağkilsə, Azerbaijan
