= Terek =

Terek may refer to:

== Places ==
=== China ===
- Terek, Baicheng County (Uyghur: تېرەك بازىرى), a town in Xinjiang, China

=== Kyrgyzstan ===
- Terek, Alay, a village in Alay District, Osh Region
- Terek, Kara-Kulja, a village in Kara-Kulja District, Osh Region
- Terek Pass, a mountain pass in the Altay Mountains, Kyrgyzstan

=== Russia ===
- Terek Oblast (1860–1920), a former division in the Russian Empire and early Russian SFSR
- Terek Soviet Republic (1918–1919), a former division of the Russian SFSR
- Terek, Russia, several inhabited localities
- Terek, Kabardino-Balkarian Republic, a town and the administrative center of Tersky District, Kabardino-Balkar Republic

== Other ==
- Terek (river), a river in Georgia and Russia
- FC Terek Grozny, a soccer club in Grozny, Chechen Republic, Russia
- Spanish cruiser Rapido, a ship which later served as the Imperial Russian Navy auxiliary cruiser Terek during the Russo-Japanese War

== See also ==
- Terek Cossacks, a Cossack host on the Terek River
- Terek–Kuma Lowland, in the southwestern part of the Caspian Depression
- Terek sandpiper, a small wading bird
