= Kara-Jygach =

Kara-Jygach may refer to the following places in Kyrgyzstan:

- Kara-Jygach, Batken, a village in Kadamjay District, Batken Region
- Kara-Jygach, Chuy, a village in Alamüdün District, Chuy Region
- Kara-Jygach, Aksy, a village in Aksy District, Jalal-Abad Region
- Kara-Jygach, Bazar-Korgon, a village in Bazar-Korgon District, Jalal-Abad Region
- Kara-Jygach, Mayluu-Suu, a town within Mayluu-Suu, Jalal-Abad Region
- Kara-Jygach, Suzak, a village in Suzak District, Jalal-Abad Region
- Kara-Jygach, Toktogul, a village in Toktogul District, Jalal-Abad Region
- Kara-Jygach, Alay, a village in Alay District, Osh Region
- Kara-Jygach, Kara-Kulja, a village in Kara-Kulja District, Osh Region
