= Novopavlovka =

Novopavlovka may refer to:

- Novopavlovka, Kyrgyzstan, a village in Chuy Province of Kyrgyzstan
- Novopavlovka, Russia, name of several inhabited localities in Russia

== See also ==
- Novopavlivka, Ukraine
