= Oy-Tal, Osh =

Oy-Tal Ой-Тал
- Location in Kyrgyzstan
- Coordinates: 40°25′14″N 74°06′43″E
- Country: Kyrgyzstan
- Region: Osh
- District: Kara-Kulja
- Elevation: 1,920 m (6,300 ft)

Population (2021)
  - Total: 2,076

Oy-Tal (Kyrgyz: Ой-Тал) is a village in Osh Region of Kyrgyzstan. It is part of the Kara-Kulja District. Its population was 2,076 in 2021. It is located to the east of the Alai Mountains and towards the west of the Tian Shan mountain range.

Nearby villages include Köndük (5 km), Terek (11 km) and Kara-Tash.
