= Novopavlivka =

Novopavlivka (Ukrainian: Новопа́влівка) may refer to any of numerous settlements in Ukraine:

- Novopavlivka, Bakhchysarai Raion, a village in Poshtove selrada, Bakhchysarai Raion, the Crimea
- Novopavlivka, Druzhkivka urban hromada, a village in Druzhkivka urban hromada, Kramatorsk Raion, Donetsk Oblast
- Novopavlivka rural hromada of Synelnykove Raion, Dnipropetrovsk Oblast
- Novopavlivka, Synelnykove Raion, Dnipropetrovsk Oblast, a village, the administrative centre of Novopavlivka rural hromada
  - Novopavlivka offensive, against the village
- Novopavlivka, Zakharivka settlement hromada, a village in Zakharivka settlement hromada, Rozdilna Raion, Odesa Oblast
- Novopavlivka, Polohy Raion, a village in Orikhiv urban hromada, Polohy Raion, Zaporizhzhia Oblast

== See also ==
- Nova Pavlivka
- Novopavlovka, Kazakhstan
- Novopavlovka, Kyrgyzstan
- Novopavlovka, Russia
- Pavlivka
