= Ak-Döbö =

Ak-Döbö or Ak-Debe may refer to the following places in Kyrgyzstan:

- Ak-Döbö, Jalal-Abad, a village in Aksy District, Jalal-Abad Region
- Ak-Döbö, Issyk Kul, a village in Jeti-Ögüz District, Issyk-Kul Region
- Ak-Döbö, Talas, a village in Bakay-Ata District, Talas Region
