= Kyzyl-Bulak =

Kyzyl-Bulak may refer to the following places in Kyrgyzstan:

- Kyzyl-Bulak, Batken, a village in Kadamjay District, Batken Region
- Kyzyl-Bulak, Kara-Kulja, a village in Kara-Kulja District, Osh Region
- Kyzyl-Bulak, Nookat, a village in Nookat District, Osh Region
