= Kyzyl-Jar =

Kyzyl-Jar may refer to the following places in Kyrgyzstan:

- Kyzyl-Jar, Aksy, a village in Aksy District, Jalal-Abad Region
- Kyzyl-Jar, Tash-Kömür, a town in the city of Tash-Kömür, Jalal-Abad Region
- Kyzyl-Jar, Osh, a village in Kara-Kulja District, Osh Region
