= Subayilda Abdykadyrova =

Kyrgyz writer

Subaĭylda Abdykadyrova
- Абдыкадырова Субайылда
- Born: March 9, 1935; Sary-Bulak, Kalinin District, Soviet Kyrgyzstan
- Died: April 22, 2010 (aged 75); Kyrgyzstan
- Education: Kyrgyz Women's Teacher Training Institute; Mayakovsky Kyrgyz Women's Pedagogical Institute
- Occupations: Poet, Writer
- Organization: Union of Soviet Writers
- Political party: Communist Party of the Soviet Union

Subaĭylda Abdykadyrova Абдыкадырова Субайылда (March 9, 1935 - April 22, 2010) was a Kyrgyz poet and writer. She was born in Sary-Bulak in the Soviet Kyrgyzstan Republic.

Abdykadyrova was named a "meritorious figure in the culture" of Kyrgyzstan and was awarded some of the country's top honors.

== Career ==
In 1957, Abdykadyrova started to write for Leninchil Zhas. She also worked as an editor for Kyrgyzstan Ayaldary and the State Committee for Television and Radio of Soviet Kyrgyzstan.

Abdykadyrova published her first collection of poetry, Любовь пришла, in Russian in 1958. She went on to write 10+ collections of poetry. Abdykadyrova wrote poems in Russian and Kyrgyz. Her poetry has been translated into Ukrainian, Belarusian, Uzbek, German, English, Italian, Kazakh, and Japanese.

In 1959, Abdykadyrova joined the Union of Soviet Writers. She served as a delegate to multiple union conferences. Later, she joined the Writers' Union of Kyrgyzstan.

Abdykadyrova was head of the art department of Ala-Too Magazine. In 1987, she joined the staff as a correspondent for Kyrgyzstan Madeniyaty.

== Poetry Collections ==
=== Kyrgyz Collections ===
- Булак [Spring (Bulak)] (in Kyrgyz). Bishkek. 1959.
- Кыз кыялы [A Girl's Dream (Kyz kiyaly)] (in Kyrgyz). Bishkek. 1961.
- Калыйпа [Kalyĭpa] (in Kyrgyz). Bishkek. 1963. OCLC 35605966. OL 52973381M.
- Чырак [Light (Chyraak)] (in Kyrgyz). Bishkek. 1966.
- Чыгыш кызы [Daughter of the East] (in Kyrgyz). Bishkek: "Kyrgyzstan" basmasy. 1969. OCLC 35610560. OL 52974755M.
- Аппак гулдер [White Flowers] (in Kyrgyz). Bishkek. 1972.
- Жер жыты [Smell of the Earth] (in Kyrgyz). Bishkek. 1974.
- Алтын бешик [Golden Cradle] (in Kyrgyz). Bishkek. 1976.
- Мекеним [To You, Motherland] (in Kyrgyz). Bishkek: "Kyrgyzstan" basmasy. 1979. OCLC 15646247. OL 52986665M.
- Суйуу жана жаз [Love and Spring] (in Kyrgyz). Bishkek. 1983. OCLC 22871470. OL 52986290M.
- Бакыт ыры [Happy Song (Bakht yry)] (in Kyrgyz). Bishkek. OCLC 35803963. OL 43785290M.

=== Russian Collections ===
- Любовь пришла [Love Has Come] (in Russian). Molodaya Gvardiya. 1958.
- Под сенью арчи: Книга лирики [Under the Shade of the Juniper: A Book of Lyrics] (in Russian). Kirghizgosizdat. 1958.
- След [Trace] (in Russian). 1971.
- След: Стихи и поэмы [Trace: Poems and Poems] (in Russian). Совет. писатель. 1975.
- Зеленый мир [Green World]. Mektep. 1982.

== Honors ==
Year	Honor	Awarding Body	Reference
1958	Medal for Merit in Labor	Soviet Kyrgyzstan Republic	
1970	Certificate of Honor	Soviet Kyrgyzstan Republic	
2006	Medal of Honor	President of Kyrgyzstan	

== Personal life ==
Abdykadyrova joined the Communist Party of the Soviet Union in 1974.

A ceremony in her honor was held 10 years after her death at A. Osmonov National Academy of Sciences of the Kyrgyz Republic.
