= Maria Nanaeva =

Kyrgyzstani pharmacologist

- Мария Токтогуловна Нанаева
- Born: 22 November 1927; Aral, Talas, Kirghiz ASSR, Soviet Union
- Died: 26 June 2020 (aged 92)
- Occupation: Pharmacologist
- Spouse: Kaiyp Otorbaev
- Children: At least two (including Djoomart Otorbaev)
- Awards: Order of the Badge of Honour; Honorary Academician of the Kyrgyz Academy of Sciences

Academic background
- Education: Kyrgyz State Medical Academy; Pirogov Russian National Research Medical University

Academic work
- Discipline: Pharmacology
- Sub-discipline: High-altitude pharmacology
- Institutions: Kyrgyz State Medical Academy

Maria Toktogulovna Nanaeva (Kyrgyz: Мария Токтогуловна Нанаева; 22 November 1927 – 26 June 2020) was a Soviet Kyrgyz pharmacologist. She was head of the Kyrgyz State Medical Academy department of pharmacology from 1961 to 1997, and was known as the founder of Kyrgyzstan’s studies of high-altitude pharmacology. She was an honorary academician of the Kyrgyz Academy of Sciences.

== Biography ==
Nanaeva was born on 22 November 1927 in Aral, Talas, then part of the Kirghiz Autonomous Socialist Soviet Republic. She graduated from the Kyrgyz State Medical Academy with honours in 1949. She held a Doctor of Medical Sciences degree, and she defended two doctoral dissertations: one at the Pirogov Russian National Research Medical University in 1952 and another on high-altitude pharmacology in 1974.

In 1954, Nanaeva joined the Kyrgyz State Medical Academy as a teacher, later serving as an assistant professor and associate professor. She became head of the KSMA’s department of pharmacology in 1961, serving until 1997.

Nanaeva wrote five books, including monographs and textbooks. She also served as a supervisor for ten PhDs, as well as an author for dozens of methodological and pedagogical recommendations. Kabar reported that the "vast majority of doctors working in our country received their education from" Nanaeva. She was known as the founder of Kyrgyzstan’s studies of high-altitude pharmacology. The KSMA's Department of Basic and Clinical Pharmacology was named after Nanaeva in 2007.

Nanaeva was awarded the Order of the Badge of Honour and named Honored Doctor of the Kyrgyz SSR during the Soviet Union. After Kyrgyzstan's independence, she was named Honored Scientist of the Kyrgyz Republic and Honorary Academician of the Kyrgyz Academy of Sciences for her work in improving the country’s studies in pharmacology. She also was an honorary citizen of Bishkek.

Nanaeva was married to economist Kaiyp Otorbaev; they had a few children, including prime minister of Kyrgyzstan Djoomart Otorbaev. She served in Frunze’s municipal soviet, having been elected to the body three times.

Nanaeva died on 26 June 2020.
