= Maydan, Kyrgyzstan =

Maydan Kyrgyz: Майдан
- Location within Kyrgyzstan
- Coordinates: 40°3′0″N 72°4′48″E
- Country: Kyrgyzstan
- Region: Batken Region
- District: Kadamjay District
- Elevation: 1,303 m (4,275 ft)

Population (2021)
  - Total: 2,168
- Time zone: UTC+6

Maydan (Kyrgyz: Майдан, romanized: Maydan) is a village in Batken Region of Kyrgyzstan. It is part of the Kadamjay District. Its population was 2,168 in 2021.

Nearby towns and villages include Pum (3 km or 2 mi), Austan (3 km or 2 mi) and Kara-Kyshtak (8 km or 5 mi).
