= Özgörüsh =

Özgörüsh may refer to the following places in Kyrgyzstan:

- Özgörüsh, Batken, a village in Leylek District, Batken Region
- Özgörüsh, Naryn, a village in At-Bashy District, Naryn Region
- Özgörüsh, Osh, a village in Özgön District, Osh Region
- Özgörüsh, Talas, a village in Bakay-Ata District, Talas Region
- Kyzyl-Özgörüsh, a village in Toktogul District, Jalal-Abad Region
