= Kyzyl-Jar, Osh =

Kyzyl-Jar Кызыл-Жар
- Location in Kyrgyzstan
- Coordinates: 40°19′15″N 74°14′27″E
- Country: Kyrgyzstan
- Region: Osh Region
- District: Kara-Kulja District
- Elevation: 2,160 m (7,090 ft)

Population (2021)
  - Total: 732

Kyzyl-Jar is a village in Kara-Kulja District of Osh Region of Kyrgyzstan. Its population was 732 in 2021.

It is located to the east of the Alai Mountains and towards the west of the Tian Shan mountain range. Nearby towns and villages include Kayyn-Talaa (2 km southeast), Terek (5 km north) and Kök-Art (15 km southeast).
