= Austan =

Austan Kyrgyz: Аустан
- Location within Kyrgyzstan
- Coordinates: 40°0′36″N 72°4′48″E
- Country: Kyrgyzstan
- Region: Batken Region
- District: Kadamjay District
- Elevation: 1,477 m (4,846 ft)

Population (2021)
  - Total: 209
- Time zone: UTC+6

Austan (Kyrgyz: Аустан, romanized: Austan) is a village in Batken Region of Kyrgyzstan. It is part of the Kadamjay District. Nearby towns and villages include Maydan (3 km or 2 mi) and Pum (8 km or 5 mi). Its population was 209 in 2021.
