= Chauvay =

Chauvay Kyrgyz: Чаувай
- Location within Kyrgyzstan
- Coordinates: 40°7′48″N 72°7′48″E
- Country: Kyrgyzstan
- Region: Batken Region
- District: Kadamjay District
- Chauvay: 1947
- Elevation: 1,450 m (4,760 ft)

Population (2021)
  - Total: 1,636
- Time zone: UTC+6

Chauvay (Kyrgyz: Чаувай, romanized: Chauvay) is a village in Kadamjay District of Batken Region of Kyrgyzstan. It was established as part of the extraction of mercury and antimony in the area in 1947. Its population was 1,636 in 2021. Until 2012 it was an urban-type settlement.

Nearby villages include Kara-Kyshtak (3 km or 2 mi) and Kara-Jygach (5 km or 3 mi).

== Population ==
Historical population
Year	Pop.	±% p.a.
1970	2,012	—
1979	2,444	+2.18%
1989	2,109	−1.46%
1999	1,634	−2.52%
2009	2,051	+2.30%
2021	1,636	−1.87%
Note: resident population; Sources:
