= Kara-Tash =

Kara-Tash may refer to the following places in Kyrgyzstan:

- Kara-Tash, Kara-Kulja, a village in Kara-Kulja District, Osh Region
- Kara-Tash, Nookat, a village in Nookat District, Osh Region
