= Gulsaira Momunova =

Kyrgyz journalist, translator, and poet (1937–2020)

- Гүлсайра Момунова
- Born: 30 December 1937; Ken-Aral, Kirghiz SSR, Soviet Union
- Died: 12 August 2020 (aged 82); Bishkek, Kyrgyzstan
- Resting place: Ala-Archinsky cemetery
- Occupations: Poet, journalist

Gulsaira Momunova, in Kyrgyz: Гүлсайра Момунова (30 December 1937 – 12 August 2020) was a Kyrgyz journalist, translator and poet. In 2011, she was given the title 'People's Poet of Kyrgyzstan'.

== Biography ==
Momunova was born on 30 December 1937, in the village of Ken-Aral (Кен-Арал) in the Bakay-Ata District of Kyrgyzstan. She graduated from school in Talas in 1955, and then, in 1960, from the Mayakovsky Women's Institute. She began work in 1961 as a journalist for the newspaper Советтик Кыргызстан (Soviet Kyrgyzstan), where she worked until 1969. From 1971, she worked as deputy editor for Кыргызстан (Kyrgyzstan). From 1973 until her retirement in 1993, she was editor of the magazine Кыргызстан аялдары (Women of Kyrgyzstan).

In 1964, Momunova published her first collection of poetry, entitled Тилек [Wish]. She wrote twenty collections of poetry during her career, two of which were translated to Russian. Her poetry is known for its folk style. In 1971, she became of member of the Kyrgyz National Writers' Union. In 1973, she made the first Kyrgyz translation of the Kazakh author I. Zhakanov's short story Returned Song.

Momunova died from kidney disease linked to COVID-19 complications in Bishkek, on 12 August 2020, during the COVID-19 pandemic in Kyrgyzstan. She was buried on 13 August, in the Ala-Archinsky cemetery.

== Legacy ==
In 2013, Momunova's 75th birthday was marked by an exhibition of her works at the National Library of Kyrgyzstan.

== Awards ==
- Honored Worker of Culture of the Kyrgyz Republic (1987)
- 'Happy Week Medal': International Song Contest – Turkey (1996)
- Tugolbay Ata Literary Prize (2003)

== Selected publications ==
- Бабалардан уңгу башат (2012).
