= Alexander Otto =

Alexander Otto may refer to:

- Alexander Otto (footballer) (born 1988), German footballer
- Alexander Otto (businessman) (born 1967), German billionaire businessman
