= Kara-Kulja District =

Coordinates: 40.6666°N 73.4992°E

Kara-Kulja Кара-Кулжа району
- District
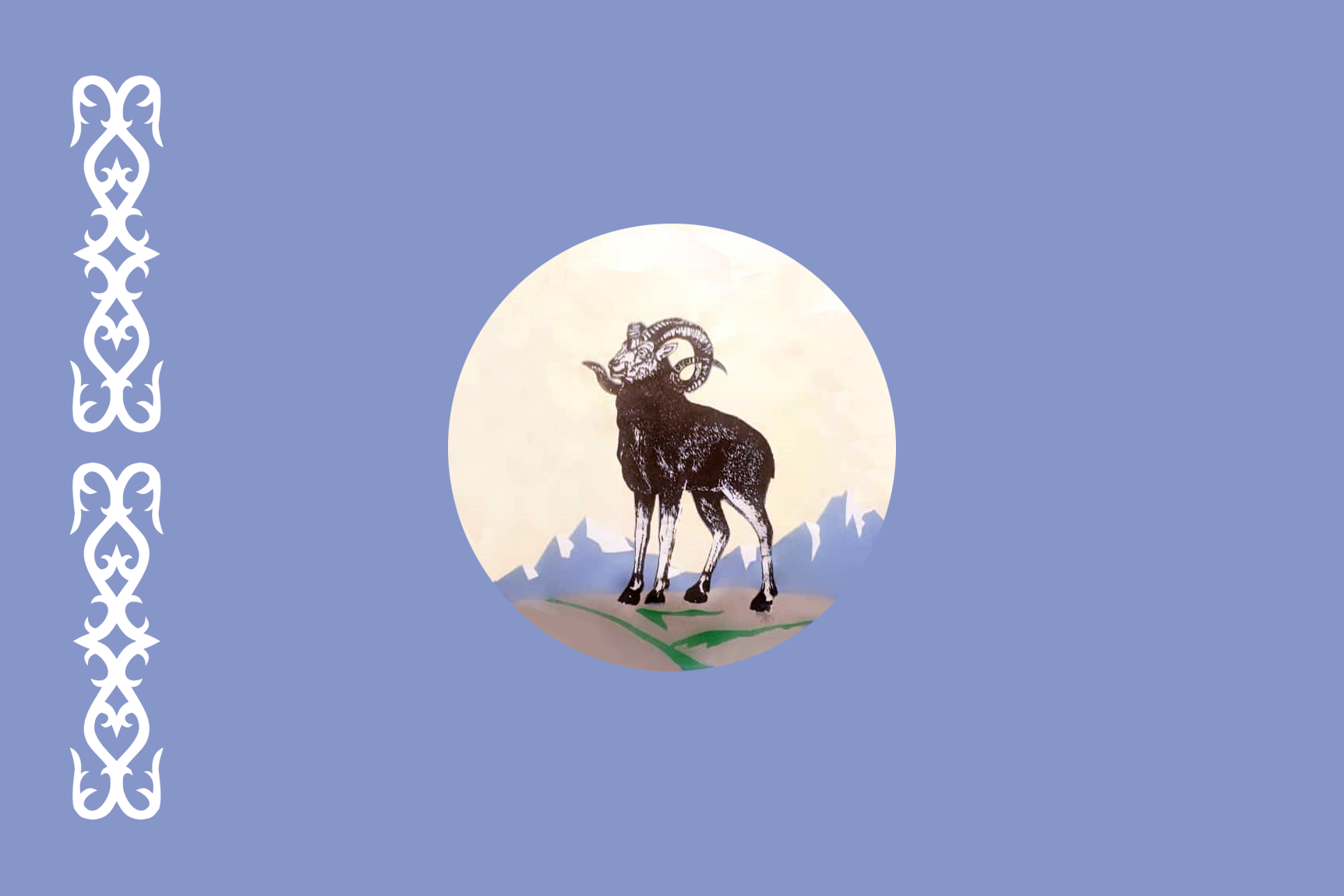
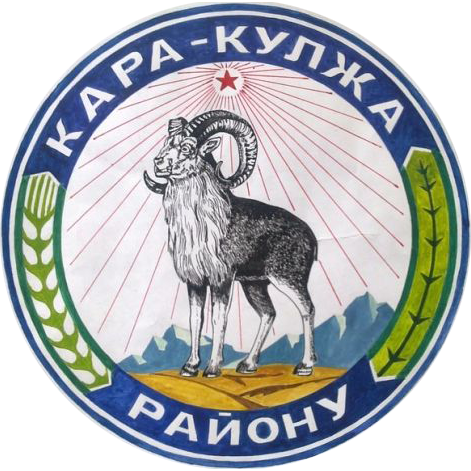
- Flag Coat of arms

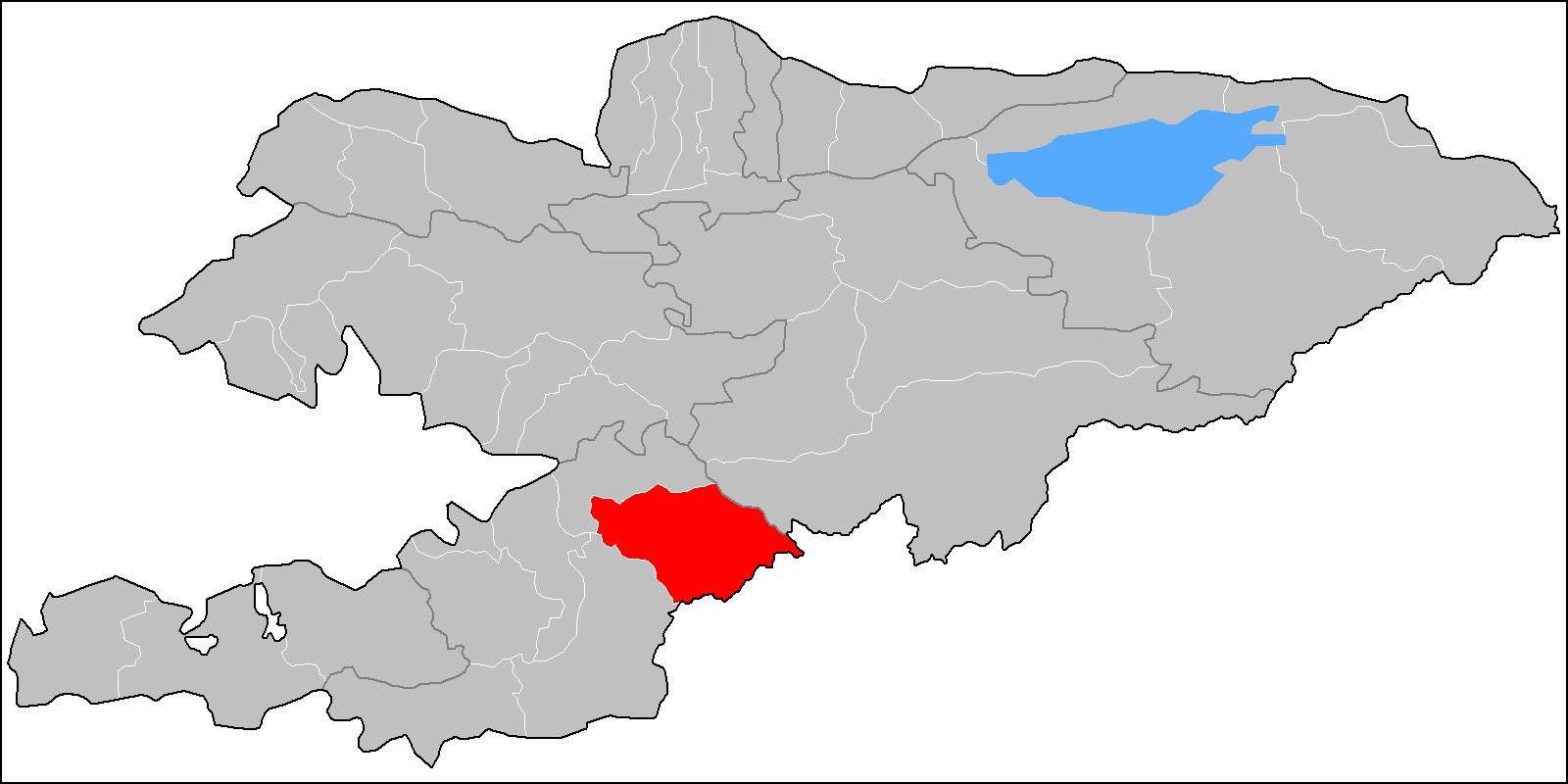
- Country: Kyrgyzstan
- Region: Osh Region

Area
  - Total: 5,813 km^{2} (2,244 sq mi)

Population (2021)
  - Total: 100,320
  - Density: 17.26/km^{2} (44.70/sq mi)
- Time zone: UTC+6

Kara-Kulja (Kyrgyz: Кара-Кулжа району, romanized: Kara-Kulja rayonu) is a district of Osh Region in south-western Kyrgyzstan. Its area is 5,813 square kilometres (2,244 sq mi), and its resident population was 100,320 in 2021. The administrative seat lies at Kara-Kulja.

== Population ==
According to the 2009 Census, the ethnic composition (de jure population) of the Kara-Kulja District was 99.9% Kyrgyz and 0.1% other groups.

Historical population
| Year | Pop. | ±% p.a. |
|---|---|---|
| 1970 | 35,922 | — |
| 1979 | 48,641 | +3.43% |
| 1989 | 61,927 | +2.44% |
| 1999 | 80,252 | +2.63% |
| 2009 | 87,691 | +0.89% |
| 2021 | 100,320 | +1.13% |
Note: resident population; Sources:

== Rural communities and villages ==
In total, Kara-Kulja District contains 55 villages in 12 rural communities (ayyl aymagy). The rural communities and villages in Kara-Kulja District are as follows:

1. Alaykuu (seat: Kök-Art; incl. Kan-Korgon, Say-Talaa, Ara-Bulak, Börü-Tokoy and Jele-Döbö)
2. Chalma (seat: Tokbay-Talaa; incl. Buyga, Besh-Kempir and Orto-Talaa)
3. Kapchygay (seat: Sary-Bee; incl. Kara-Tash, Terek-Suu and Nichke-Suu)
4. Karaguz (seat: Jangy-Talaa; incl. Altyn-Kürök, Jetim-Döbö, Kalmatay, Kara-Jygach and Nasirdin)
5. Kara-Kochkor (seat: Kara-Kochkor; incl. Ak-Kyya, Kashka-Jol and Sary-Bulak)
6. Kara-Kulja (seat: Kara-Kulja; incl. Biy-Myrza, Birinchi May and Sary-Kamysh)
7. Kashka-Jol (seat: Togotoy; incl. Jangy-Talap, Jiyde, Oktyabr and Yntymak)
8. Kengesh (seat: Kengesh; incl. Por)
9. Kyzyl-Jar (seat: Kyzyl-Jar; incl. Kayyng-Talaa, Koo-Chaty, Terek, Chychyrkanak and Küyötash)
10. Oy-Tal (seat: Oy-Tal; incl. Köndük)
11. Ryspay Abdykadyrov (seat: Sary-Bulak; incl. Kara-Bulak, Konokbay-Talaa, Kyzyl-Bulak, Sary-Künggöy, Tegerek-Saz and Toguz-Bulak)
12. Ylay-Talaa (seat: Ylay-Talaa; incl. Say, Sharkyratma, Jylkol and Sary-Tash)
Settlements of the Kara-Kulja District.
