= Terek-Suu =

Terek-Suu Терек-Суу
- Location within Kyrgyzstan
- Coordinates: 40°31′56″N 73°49′42″E
- Country: Kyrgyzstan
- Region: Osh Region
- District: Kara-Kulja District
- Elevation: 1,590 m (5,220 ft)

Population (2021)
  - Total: 477
- Time zone: UTC+6

Terek-Suu is a village in Kara-Kulja District of Osh Region of Kyrgyzstan. Its population was 477 in 2021. It is situated on the river Tar.
