= Birinchi May, Kara-Kulja =

Birinchi May Биринчи Май
- Location within Kyrgyzstan
- Coordinates: 40°37′46″N 73°41′01″E
- Country: Kyrgyzstan
- Region: Osh
- District: Kara-Kulja
- Elevation: 1,510 m (4,950 ft)

Population (2021)
  - Total: 6,543
- Time zone: UTC+6

Birinchi May (Kyrgyz: Биринчи Май) is a village in Osh Region of Kyrgyzstan. It is part of the Kara-Kulja District. Its population was 6,543 in 2021.

== Population ==
Historical population
Year	Pop.	±% p.a.
2009	6,359	—
2021	6,543	+0.24%
Note: resident population; Sources:
