= Talas District, Kyrgyzstan =

Talas Талас району
- District
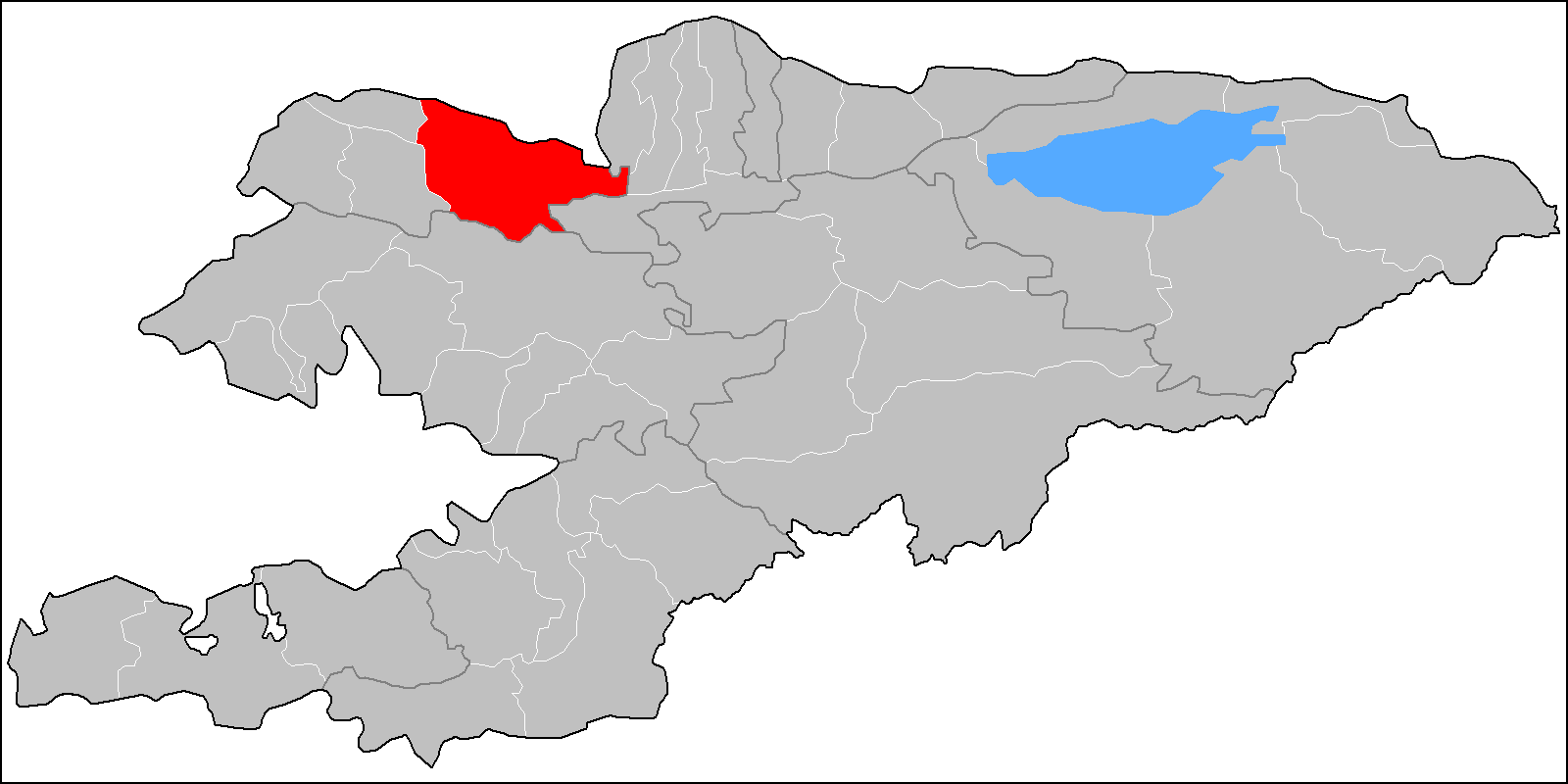
- Coordinates: 42°31′N 72°14′E
- Country: Kyrgyzstan
- Region: Talas Region

Area
  - Total: 5,051 km^{2} (1,950 sq mi)

Population (2021)
  - Total: 70,642
  - Density: 13.99/km^{2} (36.22/sq mi)
- Time zone: UTC+6

Talas (Kyrgyz: Талас району, romanized: Talas rayonu) is a district of Talas Region in north-western Kyrgyzstan. Its area is 5,051 square kilometres (1,950 sq mi), and its resident population was 70,642 in 2021. The administrative seat lies at Manas.

== Demographics ==
Its population, according to the Population and Housing Census of 2009, was 58,867. All of them live in rural areas.

Historical populations in Talas District
Year	Pop.	±%
1970	36,817	—
1979	43,423	+17.9%
1989	48,252	+11.1%
1999	50,068	+3.8%
2009	58,867	+17.6%
2021	70,642	+20.0%
Note: resident population; Sources:

=== Ethnic composition ===
According to the 2009 Census, the ethnic composition of the Talas District (de jure population) was:

Ethnic group	Population	Proportion of Talas District population
Kyrgyzs	58,867	99.3%
Russians	170	0.3%
other groups	249	0.4%

== Rural communities and villages ==
In total, Talas District include 28 settlements in 13 rural communities (ayyl aymagy). Each rural community can consist of one or several villages. The rural communities and settlements in the Talas District are:

1. Aral (seat: Aral)
2. Aydaraliev (seat: Köpürö-Bazar)
3. Bekmoldoev (seat: Sasyk-Bulak; incl. Kara-Oy, Kengesh and Chong-Tokoy)
4. Berdike Baatyr (seat: Kum-Aryk; incl. Kozuchak and Arashan)
5. Dolon (seat: Tash-Aryk; incl. Ak-Jar and Orto-Aryk)
6. Jerge-Tal (seat: Kyzyl-Tuu; incl. Chyyyrchyk and Kök-Kashat)
7. Kalba (seat: Kalba; incl. Atay Ogonbaev, Balbal and Besh-Tash)
8. Kara-Suu (seat: Kara-Suu)
9. Kök-Oy (seat: Kök-Oy)
10. Kuugandy (seat: Üch-Emchek)
11. Nurjanov (seat: Jon-Aryk; incl. Kök-Tokoy)
12. Ömüraliev (seat: Manas; incl. Chat-Bazar)
13. Osmonkulov (seat: Taldy-Bulak; incl. Ak-Korgon)
Settlements of the Talas district..
