= Kara-Kulja =

- Location within Kyrgyzstan
- Coordinates: 40°38′00″N 73°35′33″E
- Country: Kyrgyzstan
- Region: Osh Region
- District: Kara-Kulja District
- Elevation: 1,390 m (4,560 ft)

Population (2021)
  - Total: 15,616
- Time zone: UTC+6

Kara-Kulja (Kyrgyz: Кара-Кулжа, قارا-قۇلجا; Russian: Кара-Кульджа, Kara-Kul’dzha) is the center of Kara-Kulja District in Osh Region of Kyrgyzstan.

It is located in the mountain valley of the river Kara Darya, southeast and upstream from Uzgen. Its population was 15,616 in 2021.

== Population ==
Historical population
Year	Pop.	±% p.a.
2009	11,794	—
2021	15,616	+2.37%
Note: resident population; Sources:

== Climate ==
Kara-Kulja has a hot, dry-summer continental climate (Köppen climate classification Dsa). There is more rainfall in winter than in summer. The average annual temperature in Kara-Kulja is 9.4 °C (48.9 °F). About 527 mm (20.75 in) of precipitation falls annually.

Climate data for Kara-Kulja
Month	Jan	Feb	Mar	Apr	May	Jun	Jul	Aug	Sep	Oct	Nov	Dec	Year
Mean daily maximum °C (°F)	−1.5 (29.3)	1.3 (34.3)	9.0 (48.2)	17.9 (64.2)	23.0 (73.4)	27.7 (81.9)	30.1 (86.2)	29.0 (84.2)	24.4 (75.9)	17.1 (62.8)	8.2 (46.8)	0.8 (33.4)	15.6 (60.0)
Mean daily minimum °C (°F)	−11.4 (11.5)	−8.6 (16.5)	−1.2 (29.8)	5.9 (42.6)	10.2 (50.4)	13.5 (56.3)	15.5 (59.9)	14.0 (57.2)	9.1 (48.4)	3.3 (37.9)	−2.8 (27.0)	−7.9 (17.8)	3.3 (37.9)
Average precipitation mm (inches)	32 (1.3)	39 (1.5)	62 (2.4)	82 (3.2)	87 (3.4)	50 (2.0)	30 (1.2)	14 (0.6)	18 (0.7)	48 (1.9)	36 (1.4)	29 (1.1)	527 (20.7)
Source: Climate-Data.org, Climate data
