= Say, Kara-Kulja =

Say
- Location within Kyrgyzstan
- Coordinates: 40°35′00″N 73°39′35″E
- Country: Kyrgyzstan
- Region: Osh Region
- District: Kara-Kulja District

Population (2021)
  - Total: 2,678
- Time zone: UTC+6

Say is a village in Kara-Kulja District of Osh Region of Kyrgyzstan. Its population was 2,678 in 2021.
