= Ylay-Talaa =

Ylay-Talaa Kyrgyz: Ылай-Талаа
- Location within Kyrgyzstan
- Coordinates: 40°35′22″N 73°36′20″E
- Country: Kyrgyzstan
- Region: Osh Region
- District: Kara-Kulja District
- Elevation: 1,350 m (4,430 ft)

Population (2021)
  - Total: 7,356
- Time zone: UTC+6

Ylay-Talaa (Kyrgyz: Ылай-Талаа) is a village in Kara-Kulja District of Osh Region of Kyrgyzstan. Its population was 7,356 in 2021.

== Population ==
Historical population
| Year | Pop. | ±% p.a. |
|---|---|---|
| 2009 | 6,559 | — |
| 2021 | 7,356 | +0.96% |
Note: resident population; Sources:
