= Kara-Oy, Talas =

Kara-Oy Кара-Ой
- Location within Kyrgyzstan
- Coordinates: 42°27′30″N 72°42′40″E
- Country: Kyrgyzstan
- Region: Talas Region
- District: Talas District
- Elevation: 1,830 m (6,000 ft)

Population (2021)
  - Total: 2,572
- Time zone: UTC+6

Kara-Oy is a village in the Talas Region of Kyrgyzstan. It is part of the Talas District. Its population was 2,572 in 2021.
