= Ak-Kyya =

Ak-Kyya Ак-Кыя
- Location within Kyrgyzstan
- Coordinates: 40°39′30″N 73°36′0″E
- Country: Kyrgyzstan
- Region: Osh Region
- District: Kara-Kulja District

Population (2021)
  - Total: 2,884
- Time zone: UTC+6

Ak-Kyya is a village in Osh Region of Kyrgyzstan. It is part of the Kara-Kulja District. Its population was 2,884 in 2021.
