= Tegerek-Saz =

Tegerek-Saz Тегерек-Саз
- Location within Kyrgyzstan
- Coordinates: 40°25′48″N 73°37′48″E
- Country: Kyrgyzstan
- Region: Osh Region
- District: Kara-Kulja District
- Elevation: 2,121 m (6,959 ft)

Population (2021)
  - Total: 821
- Time zone: UTC+6

Tegerek-Saz is a village in Osh Region of Kyrgyzstan. It is part of the Kara-Kulja District. Its population was 821 in 2021.
