= Bakay-Ata District =

Coordinates: 42°28′48″N 71°54′36″E

Bakay-Ata Бакай-Ата району
- District
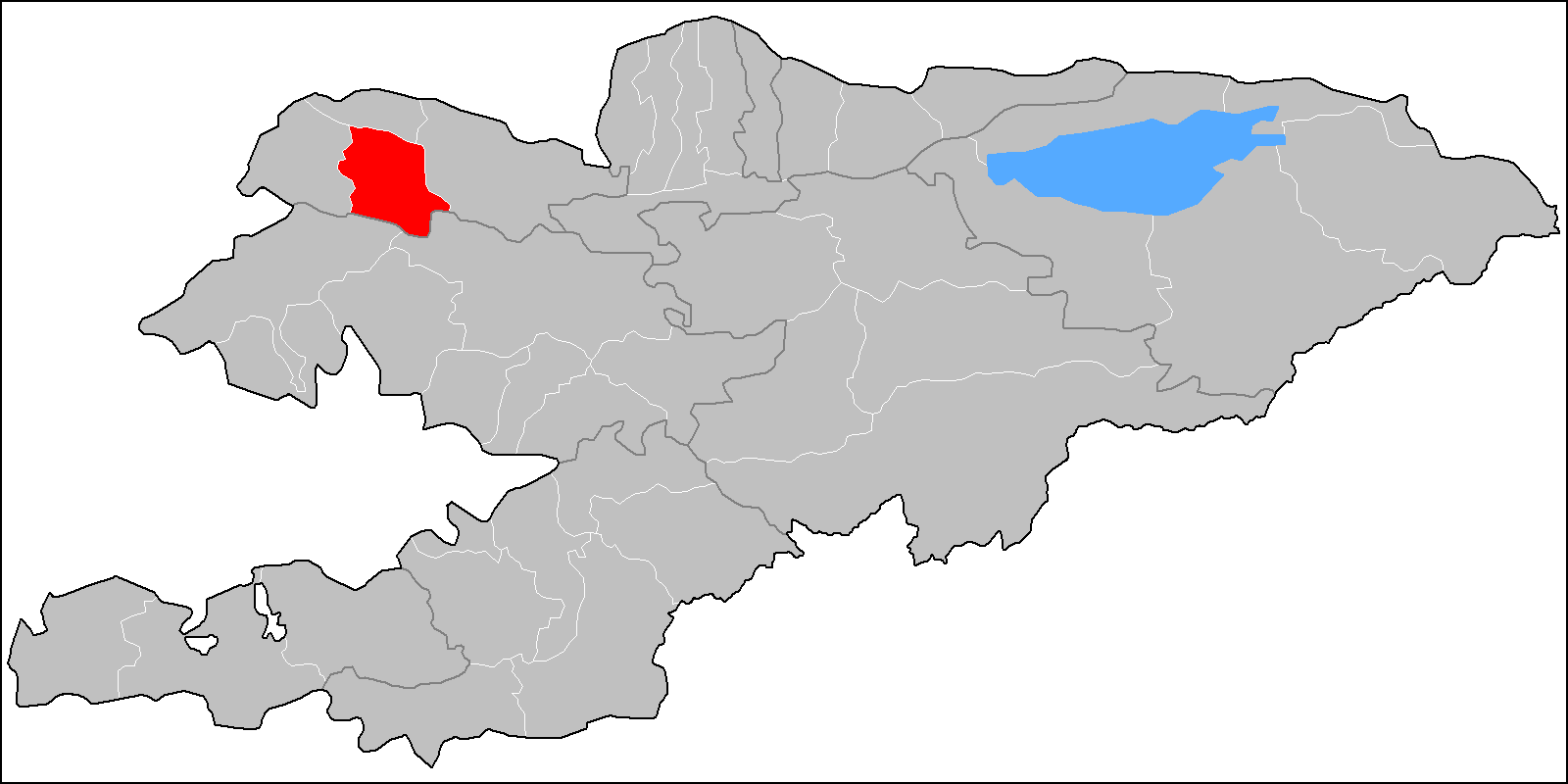
- Country: Kyrgyzstan
- Region: Talas

Area
  - Total: 2,928 km^{2} (1,131 sq mi)

Population (2021)
  - Total: 53,359
  - Density: 18.22/km^{2} (47.20/sq mi)
- Time zone: UTC+6

Bakay-Ata (Kyrgyz: Бакай-Ата району) is a district of Talas Region in north-western Kyrgyzstan. Its area is 2,928 square kilometres (1,131 sq mi), and its resident population was 53,359 in 2021. The administrative seat lies at Bakay-Ata (the former Leninpol).

== Population ==
Historical population
| Year | Pop. | ±% p.a. |
|---|---|---|
| 1970 | 26,701 | — |
| 1979 | 33,290 | +2.48% |
| 1989 | 39,676 | +1.77% |
| 1999 | 38,898 | −0.20% |
| 2009 | 44,057 | +1.25% |
| 2021 | 53,359 | +1.61% |
Note: resident population; Sources:

== Rural communities and villages ==
In total, Bakay-Ata District includes 19 settlements located in 9 rural communities (ayyl aymagy). Each rural community can consist of one or several villages. The rural communities and settlements in the Bakay-Ata District are:

1. Ak-Döbö (seat: Ak-Döbö; incl. Kyzyl-Say and Kyzyl-Charba)
2. Aknazarov (seat: Kyzyl-Oktyabr; incl. Kök-Tash, Madaniyat, Tash-Kuduk and Ür-Maral)
3. Bakay-Ata (2: center - village: Bakay-Ata; and also village Namatbek)
4. Boo-Terek (seat: Boo-Terek)
5. Keng-Aral (seat: Keng-Aral)
6. Ming-Bulak (seat: Ming-Bulak)
7. Oros (seat: Kyrgyzstan; incl. Jon-Korgon and Birinchi May)
8. Özgörüsh (seat: Özgörüsh)
9. Shadykan (seat: Yntymak; incl. Tüytö)
Settlements of the Bakay-Ata District.

== Notable people ==
- Gulsaira Momunova - poet (1937 - 2020).
