= Arashan, Talas =

Arashan Арашан
- Location within Kyrgyzstan
- Coordinates: 42°27′50″N 72°14′30″E
- Country: Kyrgyzstan
- Region: Talas Region
- District: Talas District
- Elevation: 1,340 m (4,400 ft)

Population (2021)
  - Total: 1,247
- Time zone: UTC+6

Arashan (Kyrgyz: Арашан, before 2001: Хивинка Khivinka) is a village in the Talas Region of Kyrgyzstan. It is part of the Talas District. Its population was 1,247 in 2021.
