= Sary-Bee =

Sary-Bee Сары-Бээ
- Location within Kyrgyzstan
- Coordinates: 40°33′22″N 73°53′18″E
- Country: Kyrgyzstan
- Region: Osh Region
- District: Kara-Kulja District
- Elevation: 1,710 m (5,610 ft)

Population (2021)
  - Total: 1,206
- Time zone: UTC+6

Sary-Bee is a village in Kara-Kulja District of Osh Region of Kyrgyzstan. Its population was 1,206 in 2021.
