= Toguz-Bulak, Kara-Kulja =

Toguz-Bulak Тогуз-Булак
- Location within Kyrgyzstan
- Coordinates: 40°27′36″N 73°37′48″E
- Country: Kyrgyzstan
- Region: Osh Region
- District: Kara-Kulja District
- Elevation: 2,106 m (6,909 ft)

Population (2021)
  - Total: 776
- Time zone: UTC+6

Toguz-Bulak is a village in Osh Region of Kyrgyzstan. It is part of the Kara-Kulja District. Its population was 776 in 2021.
