= Kengesh =

Kengesh Кеңеш
- Location in Kyrgyzstan
- Coordinates: 40°38′0″N 73°25′40″E
- Country: Kyrgyzstan
- Region: Osh Region
- District: Kara-Kulja District
- Elevation: 1,200 m (3,900 ft)

Population (2021)
  - Total: 2,763

Kengesh (Kyrgyz: Кеңеш) is a village in Kara-Kulja District, Osh Region, southern Kyrgyzstan. Its population was 2,763 in 2021. It is situated near the confluence of the rivers Tar and Kara-Kulja. In 2011 it made headlines after announcing it would begin staging its own criminal law trials due to dissatisfaction with the Kyrgyz legal system.

== See also ==
- Courts of Kyrgyzstan
