= Kilsəbuqov =

- Location within Azerbaijan Location within Shaki-Zagatala Economic Region
- Coordinates: 41°41′N 46°18′E
- Country: Azerbaijan
- Rayon: Balakan
- Municipality: Sarıbulaq
- Time zone: UTC+4 (AZT)
  - Summer (DST): UTC+5 (AZT)

Kilsəbuqov (also, Kilsəbugov, Kil’syabugov, and Kilisabugov) is a village in the Balakan Rayon of Azerbaijan. The village forms part of the municipality of Sarıbulaq.
