= Sarıbulaq =

- Municipality
- Location within Azerbaijan Location within Shaki-Zagatala Economic Region
- Coordinates: 41°41′02″N 46°14′05″E
- Country: Azerbaijan
- Rayon: Balakan

Population
  - Total: 1,543
- Time zone: UTC+4 (AZT)
  - Summer (DST): UTC+5 (AZT)

Sarıbulaq (also, Şarıbulaq, Sarybulak, Sarybulakhbina, and Sarykhbulakhbina)is a village and municipality in the Balakan Rayon of Azerbaijan. It has a population of 1,543. The municipality consists of the villages of Sarıbulaq, Ağkilsə, and Kilsəbuqov.
