= Kozuchak =

Kozuchak Козучак
- Location within Kyrgyzstan
- Coordinates: 42°26′20″N 72°16′30″E
- Country: Kyrgyzstan
- Region: Talas Region
- District: Talas District
- Elevation: 1,413 m (4,636 ft)

Population (2021)
  - Total: 1,873
- Time zone: UTC+6

Kozuchak is a village in the Talas Region of Kyrgyzstan. It is part of the Talas District. Its population was 1,873 in 2021.
