= Köpürö-Bazar =

Köpürö-Bazar Көпүрө-Базар
- Location within Kyrgyzstan
- Coordinates: 42°27′36″N 72°57′36″E
- Country: Kyrgyzstan
- Region: Talas Region
- District: Talas District
- Elevation: 1,975 m (6,480 ft)

Population (2021)
  - Total: 5,610
- Time zone: UTC+6

Köpürö-Bazar (Kyrgyz: Көпүрө-Базар) is a village in the Talas Region of Kyrgyzstan. It is part of the Talas District. Its population was 5,610 in 2021.

== Population ==
Historical population
| Year | Pop. | ±% p.a. |
|---|---|---|
| 2009 | 5,472 | — |
| 2021 | 5,610 | +0.21% |
Note: resident population; Sources:
