= Buyga =

Buyga Буйга
- Location within Kyrgyzstan
- Coordinates: 40°28′40″N 73°45′40″E
- Country: Kyrgyzstan
- Region: Osh Region
- District: Kara-Kulja District

Population (2021)
  - Total: 1,074
- Time zone: UTC+6

Buyga is a village in Osh Region of Kyrgyzstan. It is part of the Kara-Kulja District. Its population was 1,074 in 2021.
