= Köndük =

Köndük Көндүк
- Location in Kyrgyzstan
- Coordinates: 40°27′40″N 74°7′0″E
- Country: Kyrgyzstan
- Region: Osh Region
- District: Kara-Kulja District

Population (2021)
  - Total: 1,177

Köndük is a village in southern Kyrgyzstan. It is located in Osh Region towards the west of the Tian Shan mountain range. Its population was 1,177 in 2021.
