= Kara-Jygach, Kara-Kulja =

Kara-Jygach Кара-Жыгач
- Location within Kyrgyzstan
- Coordinates: 40°29′30″N 73°31′50″E
- Country: Kyrgyzstan
- Region: Osh Region
- District: Kara-Kulja District

Population (2021)
  - Total: 1,326
- Time zone: UTC+6

Kara-Jygach is a village in Osh Region of Kyrgyzstan. It is part of the Kara-Kulja District. Its population was 1,326 in 2021.
