= Oktyabr, Kara-Kulja =

Oktyabr
- Location within Kyrgyzstan
- Coordinates: 40°40′48″N 73°27′36″E
- Country: Kyrgyzstan
- Region: Osh Region
- District: Kara-Kulja District
- Elevation: 1,272 m (4,173 ft)

Population (2021)
  - Total: 2,690
- Time zone: UTC+6

Oktyabr is a village in the Osh Region of Kyrgyzstan. It is part of the Kara-Kulja District. Its population was 2,690 in 2021.
