= Aral, Talas =

Aral Арал
- Location within Kyrgyzstan
- Coordinates: 42°32′10″N 72°39′20″E
- Country: Kyrgyzstan
- Region: Talas
- District: Talas

Population (2021)
  - Total: 5,206
- Time zone: UTC+6

Aral (Kyrgyz: Арал) is a village in Talas Region of Kyrgyzstan. It is part of the Talas District. Its population was 5,206 in 2021.

== Population ==
Historical population
Year	Pop.	±% p.a.
2009	3,849	—
2021	5,206	+2.55%
Note: resident population; Sources:
