= Novopavlovka, Russia =

Novopavlovka (Russian: Новопа́вловка) is the name of several inhabited localities in Russia.

== Republic of Bashkortostan ==
As of 2010, one rural locality in the Republic of Bashkortostan bears this name:

- Novopavlovka, Republic of Bashkortostan, a selo in Isyangulovsky Selsoviet of Zianchurinsky District

== Krasnodar Krai ==
As of 2010, one rural locality in Krasnodar Krai bears this name:

- Novopavlovka, Krasnodar Krai, a selo in Novopavlovsky Rural Okrug of Beloglinsky District

== Lipetsk Oblast ==
As of 2010, two rural localities in Lipetsk Oblast bear this name:

- Novopavlovka, Chaplyginsky District, Lipetsk Oblast, a village in Novopolyansky Selsoviet of Chaplyginsky District
- Novopavlovka, Volovsky District, Lipetsk Oblast, a village in Lipovsky Selsoviet of Volovsky District

== Nizhny Novgorod Oblast ==
As of 2010, one rural locality in Nizhny Novgorod Oblast bears this name:

- Novopavlovka, Nizhny Novgorod Oblast, a village in Novinsky Selsoviet of Bogorodsky District

== Omsk Oblast ==
As of 2010, one rural locality in Omsk Oblast bears this name:

- Novopavlovka, Omsk Oblast, a village in Lukyanovsky Rural Okrug of Odessky District

== Orenburg Oblast ==
As of 2010, one rural locality in Orenburg Oblast bears this name:

- Novopavlovka, Orenburg Oblast, a selo in Novopavlovsky Selsoviet of Akbulaksky District

== Penza Oblast ==
As of 2010, one rural locality in Penza Oblast bears this name:

- Novopavlovka, Penza Oblast, a selo in Pokrovo-Berezovsky Selsoviet of Penzensky District

== Rostov Oblast ==
As of 2010, three rural localities in Rostov Oblast bear this name:

- Novopavlovka, Kasharsky District, Rostov Oblast, a selo in Kasharskoye Rural Settlement of Kasharsky District
- Novopavlovka, Oktyabrsky District, Rostov Oblast, a khutor in Krasnokutskoye Rural Settlement of Oktyabrsky District
- Novopavlovka, Tatsinsky District, Rostov Oblast, a khutor in Mikhaylovskoye Rural Settlement of Tatsinsky District

== Samara Oblast ==
As of 2010, two rural localities in Samara Oblast bear this name:

- Novopavlovka, Bolsheglushitsky District, Samara Oblast, a selo in Bolsheglushitsky District
- Novopavlovka, Krasnoarmeysky District, Samara Oblast, a settlement in Krasnoarmeysky District

== Saratov Oblast ==
As of 2010, two rural localities in Saratov Oblast bear this name:

- Novopavlovka (selo), Pugachyovsky District, Saratov Oblast, a selo in Pugachyovsky District
- Novopavlovka (settlement), Pugachyovsky District, Saratov Oblast, a settlement in Pugachyovsky District

== Tambov Oblast ==
As of 2010, one rural locality in Tambov Oblast bears this name:

- Novopavlovka, Tambov Oblast, a village in Pavlodarsky Selsoviet of Zherdevsky District

== Vladimir Oblast ==
As of 2010, one rural locality in Vladimir Oblast bears this name:

- Novopavlovka, Vladimir Oblast, a village in Yuryev-Polsky District

== Voronezh Oblast ==
As of 2010, two rural localities in Voronezh Oblast bear this name:

- Novopavlovka, Mikhaylovskoye Rural Settlement, Kantemirovsky District, Voronezh Oblast, a khutor in Mikhaylovskoye Rural Settlement of Kantemirovsky District
- Novopavlovka, Zaytsevskoye Rural Settlement, Kantemirovsky District, Voronezh Oblast, a settlement in Zaytsevskoye Rural Settlement of Kantemirovsky District

== Zabaykalsky Krai ==
As of 2010, one urban locality in Zabaykalsky Krai bears this name:

- Novopavlovka, Zabaykalsky Krai, an urban-type settlement in Petrovsk-Zabaykalsky District
