= Aghkilisa, Ararat =

Village in Ararat, Armenia

Aghkilisa
- Location within Armenia Location within Ararat
- Coordinates: 40°01′21″N 45°00′49″E
- Country: Armenia
- Marz (Province): Ararat
- Time zone: UTC+4 ( )
  - Summer (DST): UTC+5 ( )

Aghkilisa (also, Aghk’ilisa, Akhkilisa, and Agkilisa) is a village in the Ararat Province of Armenia.

== See also ==
- Ararat Province
