= Manas, Kyrgyzstan =

Manas
- Village
- Location within Kyrgyzstan
- Coordinates: 42°29′08″N 72°31′20″E
- Country: Kyrgyzstan
- Region: Talas Region
- District: Talas District
- Elevation: 871 m (2,858 ft)

Population (2021)
  - Total: 4,603
- Time zone: UTC+6

Manas (Kyrgyz: Манас, Russian: Манас) is a village in the Talas District of Talas Region of Kyrgyzstan. Its population was 4,603 in 2021. It is the seat of the Talas District.
