= Kyzyl-Bulak, Kara-Kulja =

Kyzyl-Bulak Kyrgyz: Кызыл-Булак
- Location within Kyrgyzstan
- Coordinates: 40°26′45″N 73°35′25″E
- Country: Kyrgyzstan
- Region: Osh Region
- District: Kara-Kulja District

Population (2021)
  - Total: 370
- Time zone: UTC+6

Kyzyl-Bulak (Kyrgyz: Кызыл-Булак) is a village in the Kara-Kulja District, Osh Region, southern Kyrgyzstan. Its population was 370 in 2021.
