= Boo-Terek =

Village in the Talas Region of Kyrgyzstan

- Location within Kyrgyzstan
- Coordinates: 42°33′36″N 71°48′0″E
- Country: Kyrgyzstan
- Region: Talas Region
- District: Bakay-Ata District
- Elevation: 1,040 m (3,410 ft)

Population (2021)
  - Total: 6,342
- Time zone: UTC+6

Boo-Terek (Kyrgyz: Боо-Терек, before 2001: Ключевка Klyuchevka) is a village in the Talas Region of Kyrgyzstan. It is part of the Bakay-Ata District. Its population was 6,342 in 2021.

== Population ==
Historical population
Year	Pop.	±% p.a.
2009	5,596	—
2021	6,342	+1.05%
Note: resident population; Sources:
