= Edgar Bernhardt =

Kyrgyz-German footballer (born 1986)

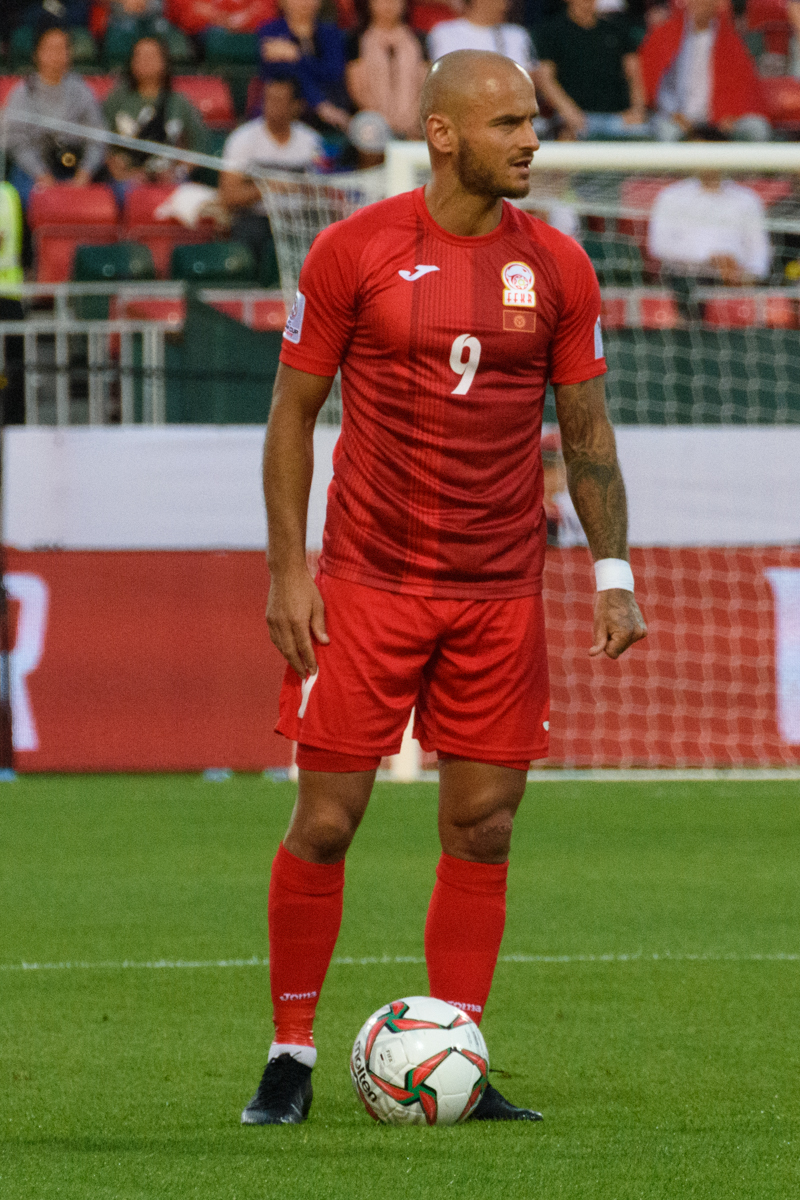
- Bernhardt with Kyrgyzstan in the 2019 AFC Asian Cup

Personal information
- Date of birth: 30 March 1986 (age 40)
- Place of birth: Novopavlovka, Kirghiz SSR, Soviet Union
- Height: 1.74 m (5 ft 9 in)
- Position: Midfielder

Youth career
- TuS Levern
- Preußen Espelkamp
- VfL Osnabrück

Senior career*
Years	Team	Apps	(Gls)
2004–2006	VfL Osnabrück	15	(0)
2006–2007	Eintracht Braunschweig II	26	(3)
2007–2008	Emmen	8	(1)
2008–2009	VfL Osnabrück II	24	(3)
2009	VfL Osnabrück	1	(0)
2009–2010	Wuppertaler SV	25	(0)
2010–2011	VPS	33	(4)
2012	Lahti	10	(2)
2012–2014	Cracovia	50	(8)
2014	Jaro	7	(0)
2015	Widzew Łódź	11	(0)
2015–2016	Prachuap	19	(3)
2016	Al-Orouba		
2016	Energie Cottbus	0	(0)
2016–2017	SV Rödinghausen	19	(2)
2017–2018	Stal Mielec	2	(0)
2018–2019	GKS Tychy	30	(1)
2019	Kedah FA	7	(0)
2019–2020	Dhaka Abahani	6	(2)
2020	Dordoi Bishkek	11	(0)
2021	Andijon	3	(0)
2021	Dordoi Bishkek	12	(0)
2022	Alga Bishkek	10	(0)
2023	Udon Thani	12	(2)
2023–2024	Preußen Espelkamp	3	(0)
2025	Bishkek City	3	(0)

International career^{‡}
2014–2022	Kyrgyzstan	40	(4)
- * Club domestic league appearances and goals as of 21 July 2026 ‡ National team caps and goals as of 5 May 2022

Edgar Bernhardt (Russian: Эдгар Бернхардт; born 30 March 1986) is a Kyrgyz former professional footballer who played as a midfielder.

== Early life ==
Bernhardt was born in Novopavlovka, Soviet Union, now Kyrgyzstan.

== Club career ==
=== In Germany and the Netherlands ===
Bernhardt made his debut on the professional league level in the Eerste Divisie for FC Emmen on 10 August 2007, when he came on as a substitute in the 55th minute in a game against Go Ahead Eagles. He returned to VfL Osnabrück on 30 June 2008 and signed on 8 June 2009 a contract with Wuppertaler SV.

=== In Finland and Poland ===
On 31 August 2010, Bernhardt moved to Finland and signed with Veikkausliiga club Vaasan Palloseura (VPS). After the season, his deal was extended. For the 2012 season, he joined fellow Veikkausliiga club Lahti.

During 2012–2014, he played for Polish club Cracovia and debuted in Ekstraklasa in the 2013–14 season. On 20 August 2014, Bernhardt returned to Finland and signed for FF Jaro for the remainder of the season.

In January 2015, he moved back to Poland and joined Widzew Łódź in second-tier I liga.

=== Kedah ===
On 27 May 2019, Bernhardt agreed to join Malaysia Super League side Kedah. He finished the year with two goals and eight assists in 20 appearances.

=== Abahani Limited Dhaka ===
In December 2019, Bernhardt signed for Bangladesh Premier League club Abahani Limited Dhaka. He made six appearances and scored two goals, before the season was cancelled due to COVID-19 pandemic.

=== Dordoi Bishkek ===
On 1 August 2020, Dordoi Bishkek announced the signing of Bernhardt on a contract until the end of the 2020 Kyrgyz Premier League season. On 16 January 2021, Dordoi Bishkek confirmed the departure of Bernhardt after the expiration of his contract. Bernhardt returned to Dordoi Bishkek on 19 July 2021, after six month with Uzbekistan Super League club Andijon.

== International career ==
Bernhardt was called up in May 2015 by Aleksandr Krestinin to represent the Kyrgyzstan national team in the 2018 FIFA World Cup Qualifiers against Bangladesh and Australia. He scored his first international goal in his debut against Bangladesh with a penalty kick, helping his side to win 3–1 in Dhaka.

== Personal life ==
Bernhardt holds German, Kyrgyzstani and Russian citizenship. He was born in Kyrgyzstan, but moved to Stemwede, Germany with his family in his early childhood.

== Career statistics ==
=== Club ===
As of 15 March 2025

Appearances and goals by club, season and competition
Club	Season	League			Cup (Note: Includes DFB-Pokal, KNVB Cup, Suomen Cup, Polish Cup, Malaysia FA Cup, Bangladesh Federation Cup and Kyrgyzstan Cup)		League cup (Note: Includes Lower Saxony Cup, Lower Rhine Cup, Finnish League Cup and Westphalian Cup)		Continental		Total	
Club	Season	Division	Apps	Goals	Apps	Goals	Apps	Goals	Apps	Goals	Apps	Goals
VfL Osnabrück	2004–05	Regionalliga Nord	5	0	0	0	–		–		5	0
VfL Osnabrück	2005–06	Regionalliga Nord	10	0	0	0	–		–		10	0
VfL Osnabrück	Total		15	0	0	0	0	0	0	0	15	0
VfL Osnabrück II	2004–05	NOFV-Oberliga	2	0	–		–		–		2	0
VfL Osnabrück II	2005–06	NOFV-Oberliga Nord	27	2	–		1	0	–		28	2
VfL Osnabrück II	Total		29	2	0	0	1	0	0	0	30	2
Eintracht Braunschweig	2006–07	2. Bundesliga	0	0	0	0	–		–		0	0
Eintracht Braunschweig II	2006–07	NOFV-Oberliga Nord	26	3	–		–		–		26	3
Emmen	2007–08	Eerste Divisie	8	1	1	0	–		–		9	1
VfL Osnabrück	2008–09	2. Bundesliga	1	0	0	0	–		–		1	0
VfL Osnabrück II	2008–09	NOFV-Oberliga	24	3	–		–		–		24	3
Wuppertaler SV	2009–10	3. Liga	26	0	0	0	–		–		26	0
Wuppertaler SV II	2009–10	Oberliga Niederrhein	2	0	–		2	1	–		4	1
VPS	2010	Veikkausliiga	6	1	–		–		–		6	1
VPS	2011	Veikkausliiga	27	3	0	0	5	1	–		32	4
VPS	Total		33	4	0	0	5	1	0	0	38	5
Lahti	2012	Veikkausliiga	10	2	0	0	0	0	–		10	2
KS Cracovia	2012–13	I liga	30	5	1	0	–		–		31	5
KS Cracovia	2013–14	Ekstraklasa	20	3	1	0	–		–		21	3
KS Cracovia	Total		50	8	2	0	0	0	0	0	52	8
Jaro	2014	Veikkausliiga	7	0	–		–		–		7	0
Widzew Łódź	2014–15	I liga	11	0	–		–		–		11	0
Prachuap	2015	Thai Division 1 League	19	3	–		–		–		19	3
Al-Orouba SC	2015–16	Oman Professional League							6 (Note: Appearances in AFC Cup)	0	6	0
Energie Cottbus	2016–17	Regionalliga Nordost	0	0	0	0	–		–		0	0
SV Rödinghausen	2017–18	Regionalliga West	19	2	–		2	0	–		21	2
Stal Mielec	2017–18	I liga	2	0	2	0	–		–		4	0
GKS Tychy	2017–18	I liga	11	1	–		–		–		11	1
GKS Tychy	2018–19	I liga	19	0	1	0	–		–		20	0
GKS Tychy	Total		30	1	1	0	0	0	0	0	31	1
Kedah FA	2019	Malaysia Super League	7	0	3	0	–		–		10	0
Dhaka Abahani	2019–20	Bangladesh Premier League	6	2	2	0	–		2	0	10	2
Dordoi Bishkek	2020	Kyrgyz Premier League	11	0	–		–		–		11	0
Andijon	2021	Uzbekistan Super League	3	0	–		–		–		3	0
Dordoi Bishkek	2021	Kyrgyz Premier League	12	0	1	0	–		–		13	0
Alga Bishkek	2022	Kyrgyz Premier League	10	0	–		–		–		10	0
Udon Thani	2022–23	Thai League 2	12	2	–		–		–		12	2
Preußen Espelkamp	2023–24	Westfalenliga	3	0	–		–		–		3	0
Bishkek City	2025	Kyrgyz Premier League	2	0	–		–		–		2	0
Career total			378	33	12	0	10	2	8	0	408	35

=== International ===
As of match played 15 June 2021

Appearances and goals by national team and year
National team	Year	Apps	Goals
Kyrgyzstan	2014	2	0
Kyrgyzstan	2015	7	1
Kyrgyzstan	2016	7	0
Kyrgyzstan	2017	4	0
Kyrgyzstan	2018	7	0
Kyrgyzstan	2019	10	3
Kyrgyzstan	2021	3	0
Total		40	4

Scores and results list Kyrgyzstan's goal tally first, score column indicates score after each Bernhardt goal.

List of international goals scored by Edgar Bernhardt
No.	Date	Venue	Opponent	Score	Result	Competition
1	11 June 2015	Dhaka Stadium, Dhaka, Bangladesh	Bangladesh	1–0	3–1	2018 FIFA World Cup qualification
2	10 October 2019	Dolen Omurzakov Stadium, Bishkek, Kyrgyzstan	Myanmar	1–0	7–0	2022 FIFA World Cup qualification
3	10 October 2019	Dolen Omurzakov Stadium, Bishkek, Kyrgyzstan	Myanmar	2–0	7–0	2022 FIFA World Cup qualification
4	10 October 2019	Dolen Omurzakov Stadium, Bishkek, Kyrgyzstan	Myanmar	7–0	7–0	2022 FIFA World Cup qualification

== Honours ==
Kedah

- Malaysia FA Cup: 2019
- Malaysia Cup: runner-up 2019

Dordoi Bishkek

- Kyrgyz Premier League: 2020, 2021
