= Özgörüsh, Talas =

Özgörüsh Өзгөрүш
- Location within Kyrgyzstan
- Coordinates: 42°31′30″N 72°02′30″E
- Country: Kyrgyzstan
- Region: Talas Region
- District: Bakay-Ata
- Elevation: 1,133 m (3,717 ft)

Population (2021)
  - Total: 6,081
- Time zone: UTC+6

Özgörüsh (Kyrgyz: Өзгөрүш) is a village in Talas Region of Kyrgyzstan. It is part of Bakay-Ata District. Its population was 6,081 in 2021.

== Population ==
Historical population
Year	Pop.	±% p.a.
2009	5,009	—
2021	6,081	+1.63%
Note: resident population; Sources:
