= Terek, Kara-Kulja =

Terek
- Location within Kyrgyzstan
- Coordinates: 40°21′36″N 74°12′00″E
- Country: Kyrgyzstan
- Region: Osh
- District: Kara-Kulja
- Elevation: 2,179 m (7,149 ft)

Population (2021)
  - Total: 1,261
- Time zone: UTC+6

Terek is a village in Osh Region of Kyrgyzstan. It is part of the Kara-Kulja District. Its population was 1,261 in 2021.

== Geography ==
It is located to the east of the Alai Mountains and west of the Tian Shan mountain range and lies at an altitude of 2,179 m (7,149 ft).

The town of Kyzyl-Jar is 8 km (5 mi) to the south, and Oy-Tal is 9 km (6 mi) to the east.
