= Kara-Bulak, Kara-Kulja =

Kara-Bulak
- Location within Kyrgyzstan
- Coordinates: 40°25′48″N 73°36′0″E
- Country: Kyrgyzstan
- Region: Osh Region
- District: Kara-Kulja District
- Elevation: 2,025 m (6,644 ft)

Population (2021)
  - Total: 710
- Time zone: UTC+6

Kara-Bulak is a village in Osh Region of Kyrgyzstan. It is part of the Kara-Kulja District. Its population was 710 in 2021.
