= Kayyng-Talaa =

Kayyng-Talaa Kyrgyz: Кайың-Талаа
- Location within Kyrgyzstan
- Coordinates: 40°18′23″N 74°16′14″E
- Country: Kyrgyzstan
- Region: Osh Region
- District: Kara-Kulja District

Population (2021)
  - Total: 1,331
- Time zone: UTC+6

Kayyng-Talaa (Kyrgyz: Кайың-Талаа) is a village in Kara-Kulja District of Osh Region of Kyrgyzstan. Its population was 1,331 in 2021.
