= Manas District =

Coordinates: 42°43′23″N 71°36′00″E

Manas Манас району
- District
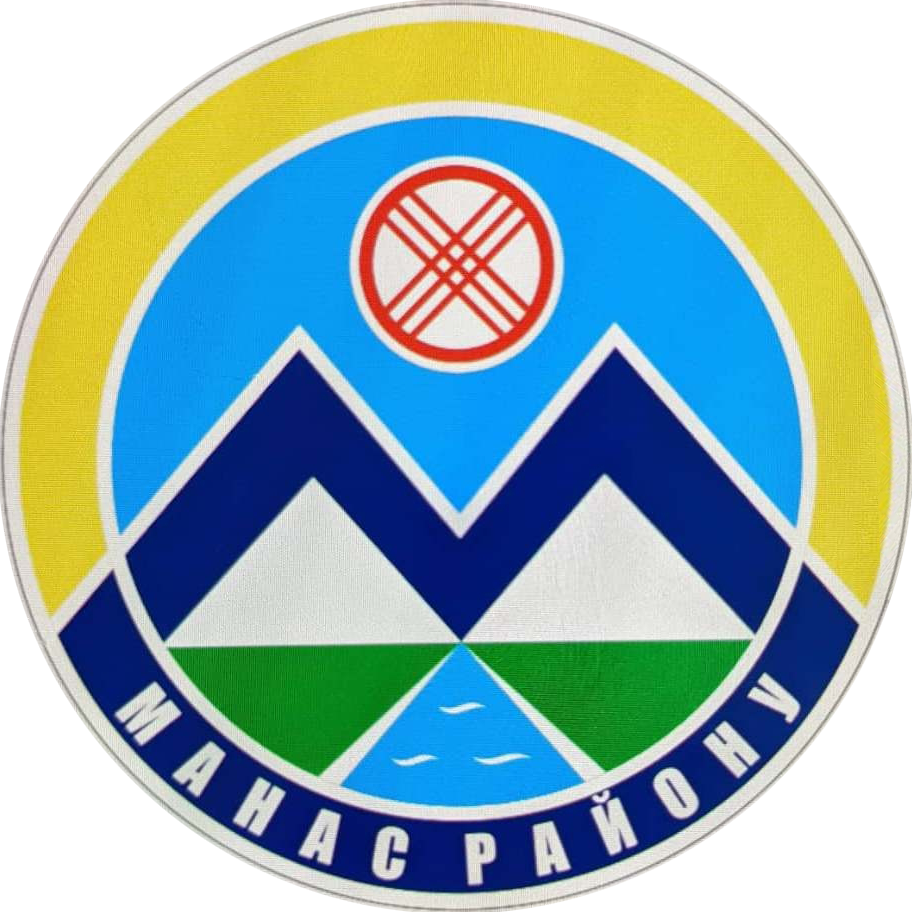
- Coat of arms

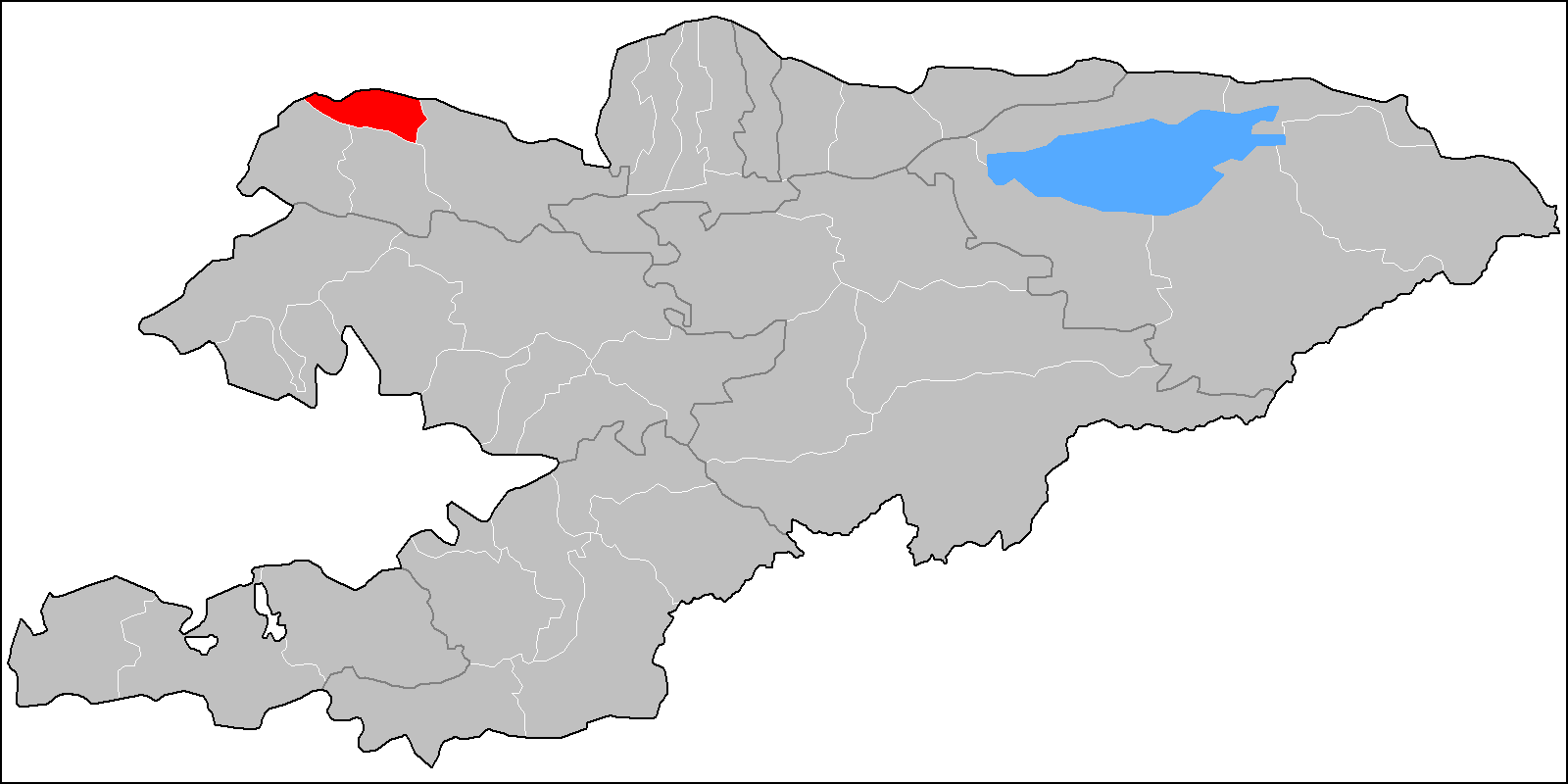
- Country: Kyrgyzstan
- Region: Talas Region

Area
  - Total: 1,198 km^{2} (463 sq mi)

Population (2021)
  - Total: 37,505
  - Density: 31.31/km^{2} (81.08/sq mi)
- Time zone: UTC+6

Manas (Kyrgyz: Манас району) is a district of Talas Region in north-western Kyrgyzstan. Its area is 1,198 square kilometres (463 sq mi), and its resident population was 37,505 in 2021. The administrative seat lies at Pokrovka.

The district is named after the mythical Kyrgyz national hero, Manas, who is said to have been born in the Alatau mountains in the raion. A few kilometers outside Talas lies a mausoleum, supposedly that of Manas, called the Kümböz Manas. However, the inscription on its richly decorated facade dedicates it to "...the most glorious of women Kenizek-Khatun, the daughter of the Emir Abuka".

The building, known as "Manastin Khumbuzu" or "The Ghumbez of Manas", is thought to have been built in 1334. It now contains a museum dedicated to the epic. A ceremonial mound also lies nearby.

== Population ==
Historical population
Year	Pop.	±% p.a.
1970	21,289	—
1979	23,094	+0.91%
1989	26,786	+1.49%
1999	28,389	+0.58%
2009	32,913	+1.49%
2021	37,505	+1.09%
Note: resident population; Sources:

== Rural communities and villages ==
In total, Manas District include 22 settlements in 5 rural communities (ayyl aymagy). Each rural community can consist of one or several villages. The rural communities and settlements in the Manas District are:

1. Kayyngdy (seat: Aral; incl. Kayyngdy, Nyldy, Sary-Bulak and Chech-Döbö)
2. Kyrgyzstan (seat: Talas; incl. Kök-Döbö and Manas)
3. May (seat: May; incl. Novodonetskoye)
4. Semetey (seat: Semetey; incl. Bala-Sary, Jayylgan, Kara-Archa and Sögöt)
5. Üch-Korgon (seat: Kyzyl-Jyldyz; incl. Ak-Tash, Jiyde, Kengesh, Chong-Kapka, Tash-Bashat and Üch-Korgon)
Settlements of the Manas District.
