= Terek, Russia =

Terek (Russian: Терек) is the name of several inhabited localities in Russia.

Urban localities

- Terek, Kabardino-Balkar Republic, a town in Tersky District of the Kabardino-Balkar Republic

Rural localities

- Terek, Stavropol Krai, a settlement in Starodubsky Selsoviet of Budyonnovsky District of Stavropol Krai
