= Nyldy =

Nyldy Нылды
- Location within Kyrgyzstan
- Coordinates: 42°37′23″N 72°04′52″E
- Country: Kyrgyzstan
- Region: Talas Region
- District: Manas District
- Elevation: 1,333 m (4,373 ft)

Population (2021)
  - Total: 840
- Time zone: UTC+6

Nyldy is a village in the Talas Region of north-west Kyrgyzstan. It is part of the Manas District. Its population was 840 in 2021.
