= Ilya Zhakanov =

Soviet/Kazakhstani writer, composer, and critic (b. 1936)

- Born: 6 May 1936 (age 90); Aktogay village in Sarysu District of Jambyl Region, Kazakh SSR, USSR
- Citizenship: Soviet Union; Kazakhstan
- Education: composer writer art critic
- Alma mater: Kazakh State University named after S.M. Kirov; Atyrau State University
- Spouse: Tiyshkul Altayeva
- Children: 4
- Writing career

Ilya Zhakanov (born 6 May 1936 in Aktogay village, Sarysu District of Jambyl Region of the Kazakh SSR) was a Soviet and Kazakhstani writer, composer, and art critic. They were an Honored Worker of Culture of the Kazakh SSR (1990), Distinguished Cultural Contributor of Kyrgyzstan (1994), Distinguished Cultural Contributor of Kazakhstan (1998), and Hero of Labour of Kazakhstan (2022).

== Biography ==
After graduating from the Philology Department of Kazakh State University named after Kirov (now Al-Farabi Kazakh National University) in 1959, Ilya Zhakanov led the Literature & Culture Section in Kazakhstan Pioneri (now Ulan) newspaper. Between 1963 and 1984, he worked as a script editor at the Kazakh SSR Council of Ministers State Committee for Television and Radio, as well as Editor-in-Chief of the Music Office of Kazakhstani Radio.

In 2011, he passed entrance tests at Atyrau State University and later successfully graduated with a diploma in Arts and Design. He mastered the profession of a painter at the age of 78.

== Writings and compositions ==
His first books, Qaita Oralğan An (The Returned song) (1968), Hoş Bol Väls (Goodbye, waltz) (1969), were instant hits. His novel about Ykylas, a great Kazakh kobyz player and kui performer, was first published in Kyrgyz as Kertologoo (1989), and then in Kazakh as Ykylas (1990). Ilya Zhakanov published collections of documentary stories of Kazakh cultural professionals Bırınşı Konsert (The first concert) (1971), Ekı Jiren (Two Red Horse) (1976), Mahabbat Välsı (Waltz of love) (1983), Aqqular qonğan aidyp köl (The lake where the swans landed) (1988) and Qarabura (1997).

He authored 200 songs, including Äselım Änım (Song Aselim), Edıl Men Jaiyq (Volga and Ural) etc. The Republic of Kyrgyzstan awarded Zhakanov with the Daneker International Award and Order for the song cycle inspired by Chingiz Aitmatov's novels Jamilia, Farewell, Gulsary and My poplar in a red kerchief.

Ilya Zhakanov translated Synğan Qylyş (The Broken Sword) (1981) by Kasymbek from Kyrgyz to Kazakh. He has written books about Kazakh composers such as Muqan Tulebaev, Latif Khamidi, Sydyk Mukhamedzhanov, Kapan Musin and Bakhytzhan Baykadamov. His documentary movies, Şoqan Jäne Muzyka (Chokan and music), Jambyl Jäne Muzyka (Jambul and music) and Säken Jäne Muzyka (Saken and music), are quite well-known. Mr. Zhakanov received Jambyl International Award (1997).

== Family ==
With his spouse, Tiyshkul Altayeva, they have 4 children – Bauyrjan, Daniar, Karlygaş and Läilä Jakanov.

== Awards and honors ==
- Honored Worker of Culture of the Kazakh SSR (1990);
- Distinguished Cultural Contributor of Kyrgyzstan (1994);
- Jambyl International Literature Award(1997);
- Distinguished Cultural Contributor of Kazakhstan (1998);
- Order of Parasat (2004);
- Order of Danaker (2004, Kyrgyzstan) — "for major contribution to the development and prosperity of national cultures, stengthening the friendship between Kyrgyz and Kazakh peoples";
- Order of Otan for outstanding contribution to national music (2019);
- Hero of Labour of Kazakhstan (2022).
