= Kara-Jygach, Batken =

Kara-Jygach Kyrgyz: Кара-Жыгач
- Location within Kyrgyzstan
- Coordinates: 40°07′48″N 72°04′48″E
- Country: Kyrgyzstan
- Region: Batken Region
- District: Kadamjay District
- Elevation: 1,188 m (3,898 ft)

Population (2021)
  - Total: 3,152
- Time zone: UTC+6

Kara-Jygach (Kyrgyz: Кара-Жыгач) is a village in Batken Region of Kyrgyzstan. It is part of the Kadamjay District. Its population was 3,152 in 2021. Nearby towns and villages include Kara-Kyshtak (2 km or 1 mi) and Chauvay (5 km or 3 mi).
