= Novopavlovka, Republic of Bashkortostan =

Novopavlovka Новопавловка
- Selo
- Location within Bashkortostan Location within Russia
- Coordinates: 52°10′N 56°34′E
- Country: Russia
- Region: Bashkortostan
- District: Zianchurinsky District
- Time zone: UTC+5:00

Novopavlovka (Russian: Новопавловка) is a rural locality (a selo) in Isyangulovsky Selsoviet, Zianchurinsky District, Bashkortostan, Russia. The population was 649 as of 2010. There are 9 streets.

== Geography ==
Novopavlovka is located 2 km south of Isyangulovo (the district's administrative centre) by road. Isyangulovo is the nearest rural locality.
