= Terek Pass =

- Interactive map of Terek Pass
- Elevation: 3,710 m (12,170 ft)

Third Approach
- Location: Kyrgyzstan
- Range: Alay Mountains
- Coordinates: 39°56′44.78″N 73°41′25.32″E

Terek Pass (elevation 3,710 m / 12,172 ft.) is a year-round pass in the Alay Mountains in the Osh oblast of Kyrgyzstan. It was historically the principal pass to enter the Tarim Basin from West Turkestan. It is also known as Terek-Davan, Terek-Dawan, and Terek-Bavan pass.

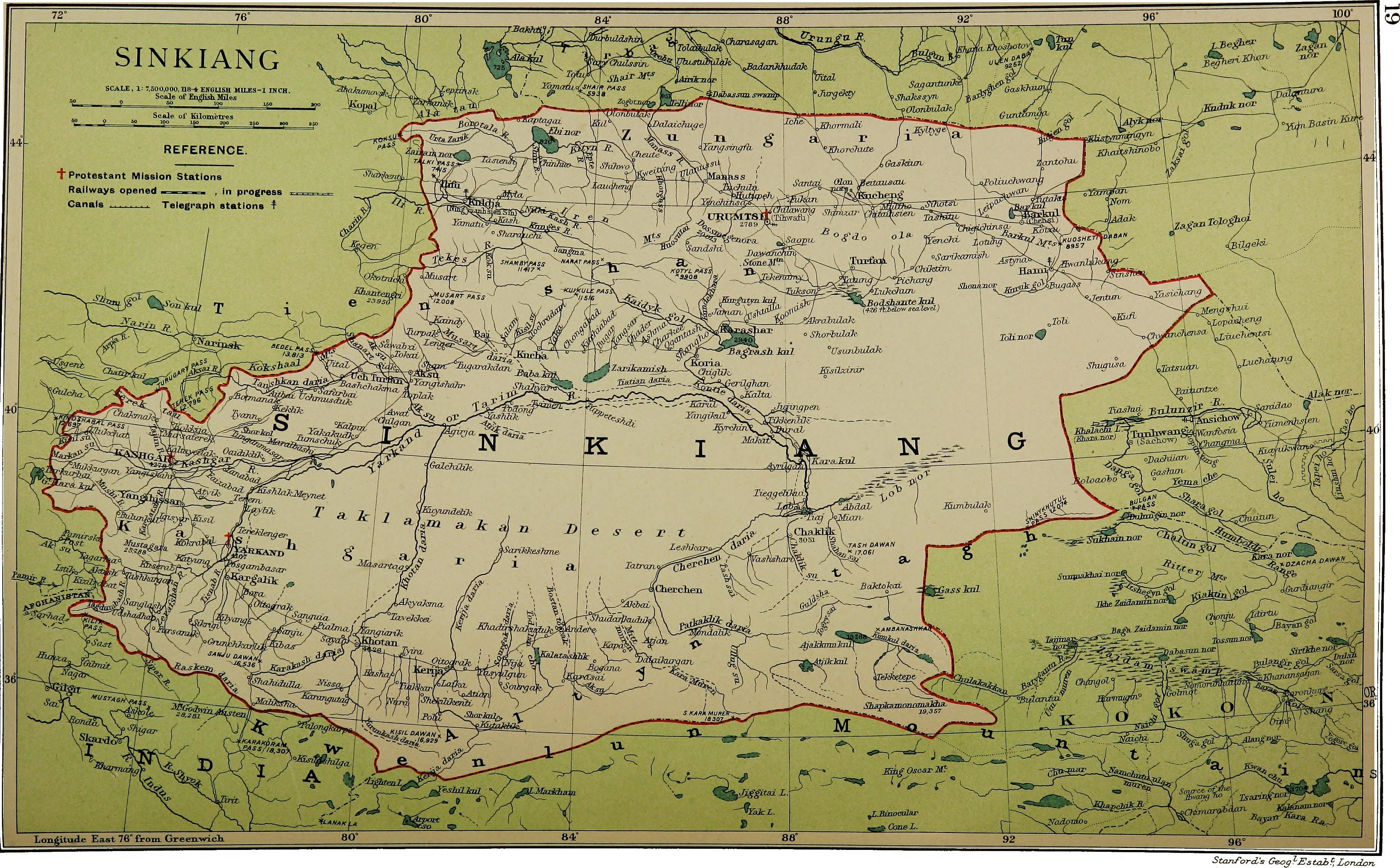
Map including the Terek Pass (1917)

Terek Pass lies on the principal medieval trading route from Kashgar, via Irkeshtam and Osh, to Ferghana and Samarkand.

The pass was used by Genghis Khan to enter central Asia.

== See also ==
- Geography of Kyrgyzstan
- Geostrategy in Central Asia
