= Pum =

Pum Kyrgyz: Пум
- Location within Kyrgyzstan
- Coordinates: 40°04′20″N 72°06′0″E
- Country: Kyrgyzstan
- Region: Batken Region
- District: Kadamjay District
- Elevation: 1,437 m (4,715 ft)

Population (2021)
  - Total: 1,009
- Time zone: UTC+6

Pum (Kyrgyz: Пум, romanized: Pum) is a village in Batken Region of Kyrgyzstan. It is part of the Kadamjay District. Its population was 1,009 in 2021.

Nearby towns and villages include Maydan (3 km or 2 mi) and Kara-Kyshtak (3 km or 2 mi).
