= Kalba, Kyrgyzstan =

Kalba Калба
- Location within Kyrgyzstan
- Coordinates: 42°27′0″N 72°24′0″E
- Country: Kyrgyzstan
- Region: Talas Region
- District: Talas District
- Elevation: 1,794 m (5,886 ft)

Population (2021)
  - Total: 1,490
- Time zone: UTC+6

Kalba (Kyrgyz: Калба) is a village in the Talas Region of Kyrgyzstan. It is part of the Talas District. Its population was 1,490 in 2021.
