= Krashen =

Krashen Կրաշեն
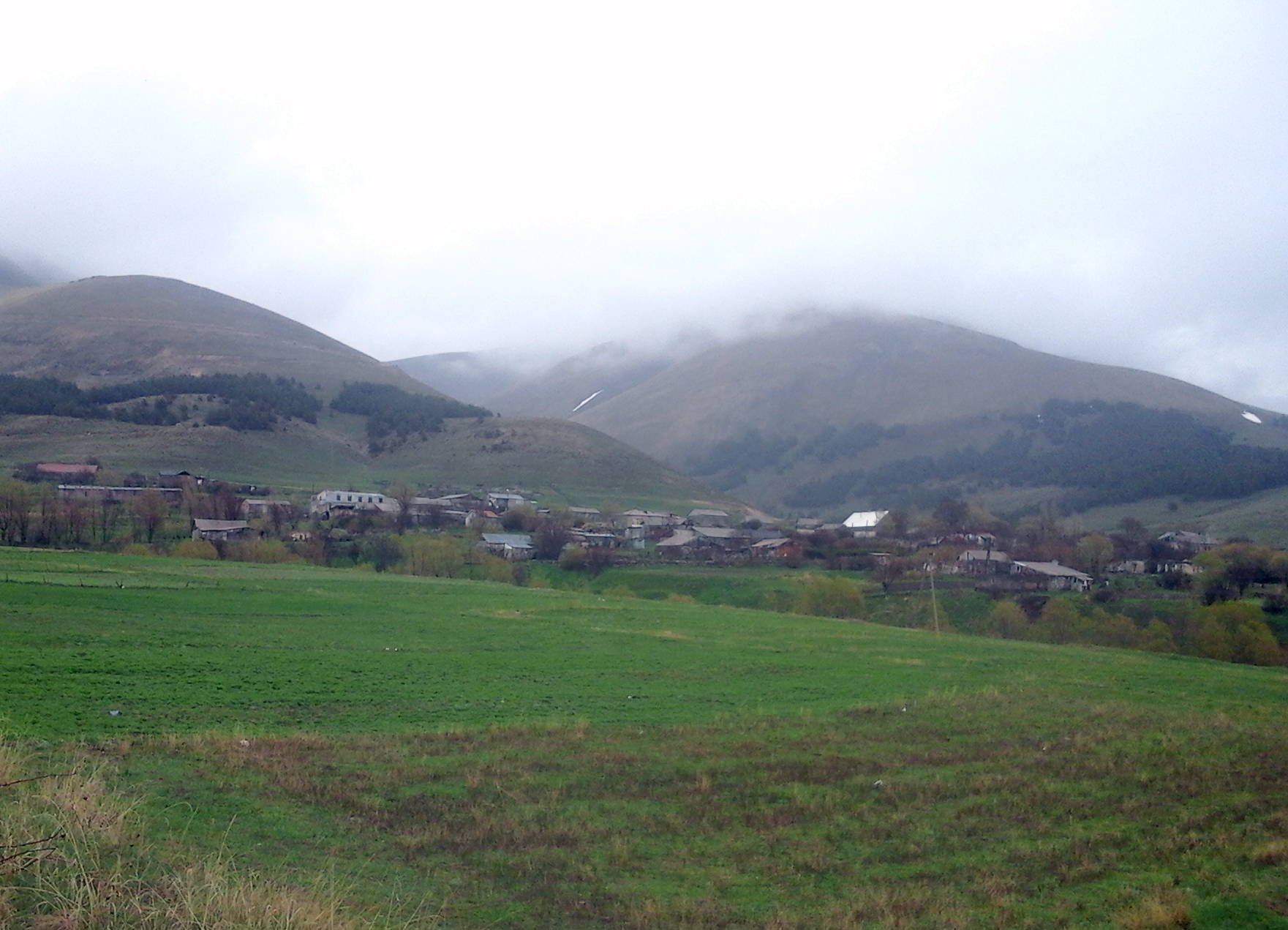
- Krashen

- Location within Armenia Location within Shirak
- Coordinates: 40°52′N 43°57′E
- Country: Armenia
- Province: Shirak
- Municipality: Akhuryan

Population (2011)
  - Total: 244
- Time zone: UTC+4
  - Summer (DST): UTC+5

Krashen (Armenian: Կրաշեն) is a village in the Akhuryan Municipality of the Shirak Province of Armenia.

== Demographics ==
Historical population
Year	Pop.	±% p.a.
1831	219	—
1897	614	+1.57%
1926	279	−2.68%
1939	424	+3.27%
1959	376	−0.60%
1970	242	−3.93%
1979	222	−0.95%
1989	140	−4.51%
2001	294	+6.38%
2011	244	−1.85%
