= Kök-Art =

- Location within Kyrgyzstan
- Coordinates: 40°16′0″N 74°23′40″E
- Country: Kyrgyzstan
- Region: Osh Region
- District: Kara-Kulja District
- Elevation: 1,715 m (5,627 ft)

Population (2021)
  - Total: 2,872
- Time zone: UTC+6

Kök-Art is a village in Osh Region of Kyrgyzstan. It is part of the Kara-Kulja District. Its population was 2,872 in 2021.
