= Yntymak =

Yntymak Ынтымак
- Location within Kyrgyzstan
- Coordinates: 42°28′29″N 72°06′01″E
- Country: Kyrgyzstan
- Region: Talas Region
- District: Bakay-Ata District
- Elevation: 1,446 m (4,744 ft)

Population (2021)
  - Total: 2,918
- Time zone: UTC+6

Yntymak (Kyrgyz: Ынтымак, before 2001: Калинин Kalinin) is a village in the Talas Region of north-west Kyrgyzstan. It is part of the Bakay-Ata District. Its population was 2,918 in 2021.
