= Kara-Kyshtak =

Kara-Kyshtak Kyrgyz: Кара-Кыштак Uzbek: Qora-Qishloq
- Location within Kyrgyzstan
- Coordinates: 40°06′36″N 72°06′00″E
- Country: Kyrgyzstan
- Region: Batken Region
- District: Kadamjay District
- Elevation: 1,204 m (3,950 ft)

Population (2021)
  - Total: 1,299
- Time zone: UTC+6

Kara-Kyshtak (Kyrgyz: Кара-Кыштак, romanized: Kara-Kyshtak; Uzbek: Qora-Qishloq) is a village in Batken Region of Kyrgyzstan. It is part of the Kadamjay District. Its population was 1,299 in 2021. Nearby towns and villages include Kara-Jygach (2 km or 1 mi) and Pum (3 km or 2 mi).
