= Kara-Tash, Kara-Kulja =

Kara-Tash
- Location within Kyrgyzstan
- Coordinates: 40°32′56″N 73°58′31″E
- Country: Kyrgyzstan
- Region: Osh Region
- District: Kara-Kulja District
- Elevation: 1,725 m (5,659 ft)

Population (2021)
  - Total: 782
- Time zone: UTC+6

Kara-Tash is a village in Kara-Kulja District of Osh Region of Kyrgyzstan. Its population was 782 in 2021.
