= Rot-Front =

Rot-Front Рот-Фронт
- Location within Kyrgyzstan
- Coordinates: 42°43′20″N 75°06′20″E
- Country: Kyrgyzstan
- Region: Chüy Region
- District: Ysyk-Ata District
- Elevation: 1,075 m (3,527 ft)

Population (2021)
  - Total: 968

Rot-Front (Russian Рот-Фронт) is a settlement 60 kilometres east of Bishkek in the Chüy Region of Kyrgyzstan, near the border of Kazakhstan. Its population was 968 in 2021. Rot-Front was originally settled by Germans; a significant German minority remains in the settlement. It was founded as Bergtal (also sometimes spelled Bergthal) and renamed Rot-Front in 1927.

== History ==
At the end of the 19th century, German-speaking settlers from the Russian Empire moved to Central Asia to obtain new lands. Most these settlers were Mennonites. The village of Bergtal, one of several originally German settlements in Kyrgyzstan, was established on the very rich black soil of the Chüy Valley, at the foot of the Tian Shan mountains, by Baptist and Mennonite families who had emigrated from East Frisia some three hundred years earlier to escape forced military service. At the end of the 19th century many moved to central Asia from the Volga and Crimea.

In the first year of settlement, 41 simlins (earth dwellings) made of mud bricks with thatched roofs were built along the village street, which were about 2 metres deep into the ground and about 80 centimetres above the surface.

The first school teachers gave their lessons in German in private homes. Even after the village school was built, German was still the language of instruction until 1938; after that, only Russian was allowed to be taught and pupils were forbidden to speak German.

In 1931, the kolkhoz Ragaduga was also formed in "Bergtal" together with Grünfeld and with the Stalinization of the Soviet Union the village was renamed Rot-Front in 1936 after the separation of the kolkhoz.

During the Second World War, the Bergtalers suffered the same fate as all ethnic Germans in the Soviet Union. They were not deported, they already lived in a region to which others were deported, but the ethnic Germans of Rotfront were subject to much suspicion and discrimination and more than a third of the men conscripted died in the forced labour of the "Trudarmee". Women were also sent for forced labour. Many children were left without parents and without care. Parallel to the forced labour, other minorities from the Caucasus were forcibly resettled in the Red Front.

After the war, the life of the inhabitants and the economy of the village were slow to recover. It was not until the 1960s and 1970s that things began to pick up again; the Germans were also slowly able to come together again for church services. As the majority of the inhabitants still had relatives in Germany, it was possible to apply for resettlement to Germany from the 1980s onwards. From 1986, when perestroika was announced under Mikhail Gorbachev, until the collapse of the Soviet Union, the vast majority of residents had applied for resettlement to Germany. Due to the collapse of the agricultural collective farms after 1991, many residents lost their jobs. The Kyrgyz language was introduced as the state language. By 1992, more than half of the former 900 German residents of "Rot-Front" had moved to Germany. After the co-operative founded in the 1990s went bankrupt in 2010 and many villagers lost their jobs, there was another wave of emigration of German families and around half of the remaining Germans emigrated to Germany. Today, only around 150 ethnic Germans still live in the village. However, "Rot-Front/Bergtal" is one of the few villages in Central Asia where a significant German minority still lives. Almost all of them have relatives in Germany, visit each other and have permission to travel to Germany.

== Today ==
After Kyrgyzstan's independence in 1991, arising from the collapse of the Soviet Union, the remaining German residents received permission to display the village's original name, Bergtal, on their road signs, underneath the official designation of "Rotfront". A small museum in the school house, established with financial support from the German government, displays letters and photographs recounting the migration of the villagers' ancestors to Kyrgyzstan and their past life in the village. Since the beginning of the 1990s, the German government has also provided a German teacher for the community. Generous financial and material aid from the German government for the local agricultural cooperative has, however, for the most part been wasted or misused.

In 1995 a film was made entitled Milch und Honig aus Rotfront (Milk and Honey from Rotfront), depicting the life of the German residents of Bergtal.

Today, Bergtal/Rotfront has the second largest community of people of German background in central Asia; however, a majority of the population of the village is now of Kyrgyz descent. It is believed to be the only remaining village in central Asia with a substantial German minority.

Many of the houses of the former inhabitants of German origin were bought by Kyrgyz. There is no longer a strict separation between the Christian Germans and Muslim Kyrgyz. Lessons in the village are also no longer held in German; instead, they are taught in Russian and Kyrgyz.
