= Kara-Kochkor =

Kara-Kochkor Кара-Кочкор
- Location within Kyrgyzstan
- Coordinates: 40°39′50″N 73°30′0″E
- Country: Kyrgyzstan
- Region: Osh Region
- District: Kara-Kulja District
- Elevation: 1,272 m (4,173 ft)

Population (2021)
  - Total: 4,239
- Time zone: UTC+6

Kara-Kochkor is a village in Osh Region of Kyrgyzstan. It is part of the Kara-Kulja District. Its population was 4,239 in 2021.
