= Alexander Otto (footballer) =

Kyrgyzstani-German footballer

Personal information
- Date of birth: 28 January 1988 (age 38)
- Place of birth: Orlovka, Kirghiz SSR, Soviet Union
- Height: 1.74 m (5 ft 9 in)
- Position: Right-back

Youth career
- –2001: FC 08 Landsweiler-Reden
- 2001–2007: 1. FC Saarbrücken

Senior career*
Years	Team	Apps	(Gls)
2007–2013	1. FC Saarbrücken II		
2007–2013	1. FC Saarbrücken		
2013–2015	SV Röchling Völklingen		
- * Club domestic league appearances and goals

Alexander Otto (born 28 January 1988) is a German former professional footballer who played as a right-back.
