= Ak-Döbö, Talas =

Ak-Döbö Ак-Дөбө
- Location within Kyrgyzstan
- Coordinates: 42°31′48″N 71°57′0″E
- Country: Kyrgyzstan
- Region: Talas Region
- District: Bakay-Ata District
- Elevation: 1,087 m (3,566 ft)

Population (2021)
  - Total: 4,912
- Time zone: UTC+6

Ak-Döbö (Kyrgyz: Ак-Дөбө, before 2001: Орловка Orlovka) is a village in the Talas Region of Kyrgyzstan. It is part of the Bakay-Ata District. Its population was 4,912 in 2021.
