= Bakay-Ata =

Bakay-Ata Бакай-Ата
- Location within Kyrgyzstan
- Coordinates: 42°28′48″N 71°54′36″E
- Country: Kyrgyzstan
- Region: Talas
- District: Bakay-Ata
- Elevation: 1,192 m (3,911 ft)

Population (2021)
  - Total: 7,928
- Time zone: UTC+6

Bakay-Ata (Kyrgyz: Бакай-Ата, before 2001: Ленинполь Leninpol) is a village in the Talas Region of Kyrgyzstan. Its population was 7,928 in 2021. It is the administrative seat of Bakay-Ata District. To the south, the Urmaral valley runs up into the Talas Ala-Too Range.

== Population ==
Historical population
Year	Pop.	±% p.a.
2009	6,834	—
2021	7,928	+1.25%
Note: resident population; Sources:
