= Sary-Bulak, Kara-Kulja =

Sary-Bulak Kyrgyz: Сары-Булак
- Location within Kyrgyzstan
- Coordinates: 40°29′10″N 73°37′50″E
- Country: Kyrgyzstan
- Region: Osh Region
- District: Kara-Kulja District

Population (2021)
  - Total: 739
- Time zone: UTC+6

Sary-Bulak (Kyrgyz: Сары-Булак) is a village in Osh Region of Kyrgyzstan. It is part of the Kara-Kulja District. Its population was 739 in 2021.
