= Novopavlovka, Kyrgyzstan =

Novopavlovka
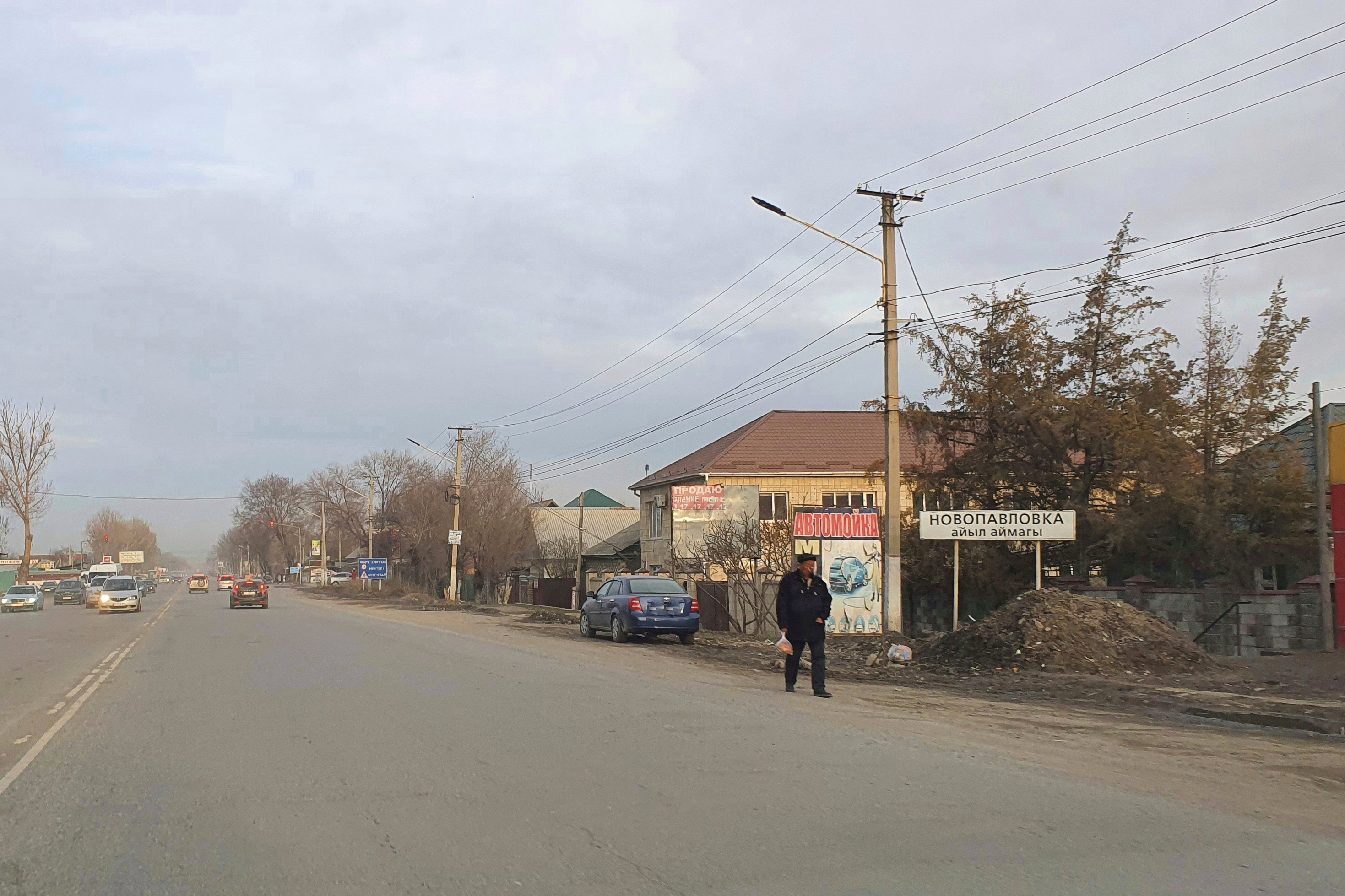

- Location within Kyrgyzstan
- Coordinates: 42°52′12″N 74°28′48″E
- Country: Kyrgyzstan
- Region: Chüy Region
- District: Sokuluk District
- Established: 1913

Area
  - Total: 525 km^{2} (203 sq mi)
- Elevation: 738 m (2,421 ft)

Population (2021)
  - Total: 20,592

Novopavlovka is a village in the Sokuluk District of Chüy Region of Kyrgyzstan. Its population was 20,592 in 2021. It is a centrepoint of the German community in Kyrgyzstan; its notable former inhabitants include Lilli Schwarzkopf and Edgar Bernhardt.

== Population ==
Historical population
Year	Pop.	±% p.a.
2009	21,357	—
2021	20,592	−0.30%
Note: resident population; Sources:
