= Aral =

Aral may refer to:

== People ==
- Cahit Aral (1927–2011), Turkish engineer, politician and former government minister
- Coşkun Aral (born 1956), Turkish photo journalist and war correspondent
- Göran Aral (born 1953), Swedish footballer
- Meriç Aral (born 1988), Turkish actress
- Oğuz Aral (1936–2004), Turkish political cartoonist
- Aral Şimşir (born 2002), Danish footballer

== Places ==
=== Kyrgyzstan ===
- Aral, Chuy, a village in Chüy District, Chüy Region
- Aral, Jayyl, a village in Jayyl District, Chüy Region
- Aral, Issyk Kul, a village in Tüp District, Issyk-Kul Region
- Aral, Toktogul District, a village in Toktogul District, Jalal-Abad Region
- Aral, Nooken, a village in Nooken District, Jalal-Abad Region
- Aral, Kara-Darya, a village in Kara-Darya ayyl aymagy, western Suzak District, Jalal-Abad Region
- Aral, Suzak District, a village in Suzak ayyl aymagy, southern Suzak District, Jalal-Abad Region
- Aral, Tash-Bulak, a village in Tash-Bulak ayyl aymagy, central Suzak District, Jalal-Abad Region
- Aral, Toguz-Toro, a village in Toguz-Toro District, Jalal-Abad Region
- Aral, Naryn, a village in Jumgal District, Naryn Region
- Aral, Osh, a village in Nookat District, Osh Region
- Aral, Manas, a village in Manas District, Talas Region
- Aral, Talas, a village in Talas District, Talas Region

=== Kazakhstan ===
- Aral, Kazakhstan, a town in Kyzylorda Province
- Aral District, a district of Kyzylorda Province

=== Other places ===
- Aral, Michigan, an unincorporated community
- Aral Sea, a lake between Kazakhstan and Uzbekistan
- Aral, Azerbaijan (disambiguation), places in Azerbaijan
- Aral, Xinjiang, People's Republic of China

== Other uses ==
- Aral AG, a gasoline and gas station company in Germany, Luxembourg, and the Czech Republic
- Aral Vorkosigan, father of Miles Vorkosigan in the Vorkosigan Saga science fiction universe

== See also ==
- Aral Formation, a geologic formation in Kazakhstan
