= Dostuk, Suzak District =

Dostuk Достук
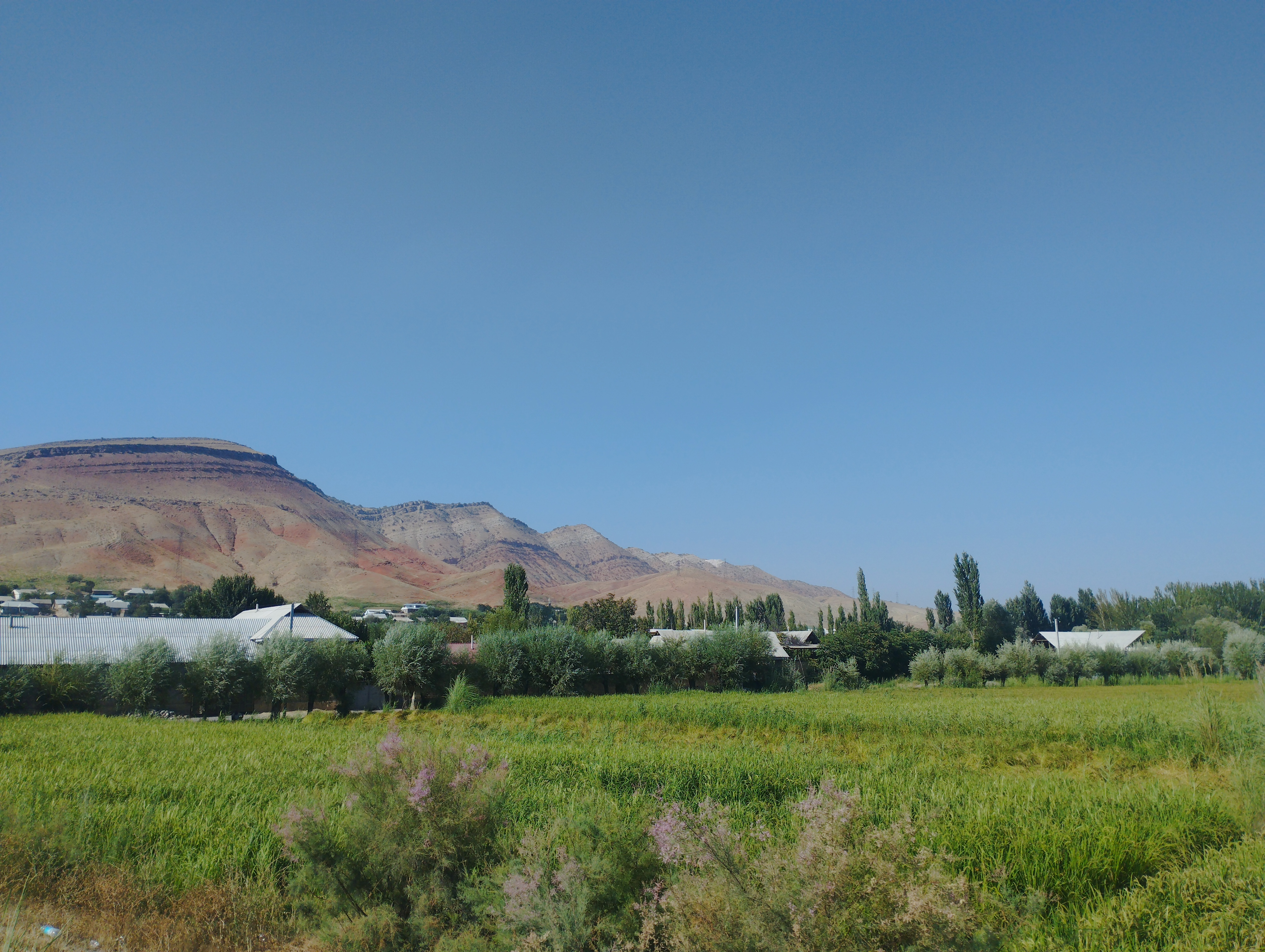

- Location in Kyrgyzstan
- Coordinates: 40°52′05″N 72°50′45″E
- Country: Kyrgyzstan
- Region: Jalal-Abad Region
- District: Suzak District
- Elevation: 569 m (1,868 ft)

Population (2021)
  - Total: 1,960
- Time zone: UTC+06:00 (KGT)

Dostuk (formerly "Serniy") is a village in Suzak District, Jalal-Abad Region, Kyrgyzstan. Its population was 1,960 in 2021. It is situated near the confluence of the rivers Kögart and Kara Darya.
