= Blagoveshchenka, Kyrgyzstan =

Blagoveshchenka Благовещенка
- Location in Kyrgyzstan
- Coordinates: 40°58′40″N 72°58′0″E
- Country: Kyrgyzstan
- Region: Jalal-Abad Region
- District: Suzak District

Population (2021)
  - Total: 5,848

Blagoveshchenka is a village in Suzak District, Jalal-Abad Region, Kyrgyzstan. Its population was 5,848 in 2021.

== Population ==
Historical population
Year	Pop.	±% p.a.
2009	4,235	—
2021	5,848	+2.73%
Note: resident population; Sources:
