= Kyr-Jol =

Kyr-Jol Кыр-Жол
- Location in Kyrgyzstan
- Coordinates: 40°58′30″N 72°56′10″E
- Country: Kyrgyzstan
- Region: Jalal-Abad Region
- District: Suzak District

Population (2021)
  - Total: 811

Kyr-Jol is a village in Suzak District, Jalal-Abad Region, Kyrgyzstan. Its population was 811 in 2021.
