= Jar-Kyshtak, Yrys =

Jar-Kyshtak Жар-Кыштак
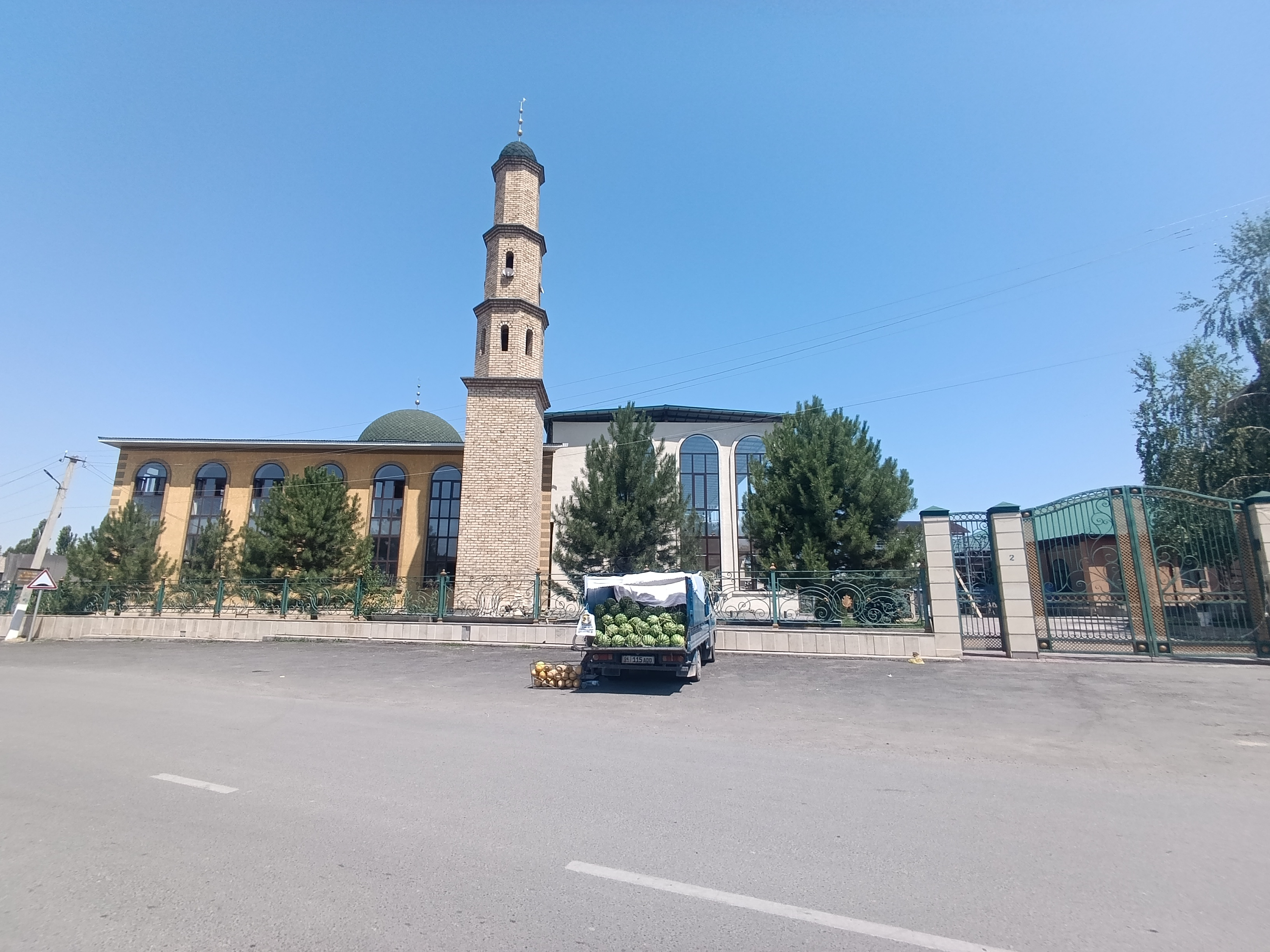

- Location in Kyrgyzstan
- Coordinates: 40°53′00″N 72°56′50″E
- Country: Kyrgyzstan
- Region: Jalal-Abad Region
- District: Suzak District

Population (2021)
  - Total: 6,253

Jar-Kyshtak (formerly: Kirov, Kyrgyz: Жар-Кыштак, Uzbek: Yor-Qishloq) is a village in Yrys rural community, Suzak District, Jalal-Abad Region, Kyrgyzstan. Its population was 6,253 in 2021.

== Population ==
Historical population
Year	Pop.	±% p.a.
2009	4,497	—
2021	6,253	+2.79%
Note: resident population; Sources:
