= Jangy-Dyykan =

Jangy-Dyykan Жаңы-Дыйкан
- Location in Kyrgyzstan
- Coordinates: 40°57′30″N 72°55′50″E
- Country: Kyrgyzstan
- Region: Jalal-Abad Region
- District: Suzak District

Population (2021)
  - Total: 2,726

Jangy-Dyykan is a village in Suzak District, Jalal-Abad Region, Kyrgyzstan. Its population was 2,726 in 2021.
