= Ladan-Kara =

Lavdan-Kara Ладан-Кара
- Location in Kyrgyzstan
- Coordinates: 40°55′35″N 72°57′25″E
- Country: Kyrgyzstan
- Region: Jalal-Abad Region
- District: Suzak District

Population (2021)
  - Total: 8,886

Ladan-Kara (also Kayragach) is a village in Suzak District, Jalal-Abad Region, Kyrgyzstan. Its population was 8,886 in 2021.

== Population ==
Historical population
Year	Pop.	±% p.a.
2009	6,384	—
2021	8,886	+2.79%
Note: resident population; Sources:
