= Tash-Bulak =

Tash-Bulak could refer to the following places in Kyrgyzstan:

- Tash-Bulak, Osh, a village in the Nookat District, Osh Region
- Tash-Bulak, Bazar-Korgon, a village in the Bazar-Korgon District, Jalal-Abad Region
- Tash-Bulak, Suzak, a village in the Suzak District, Jalal-Abad Region
