= Totuya =

Totuya Тотуя
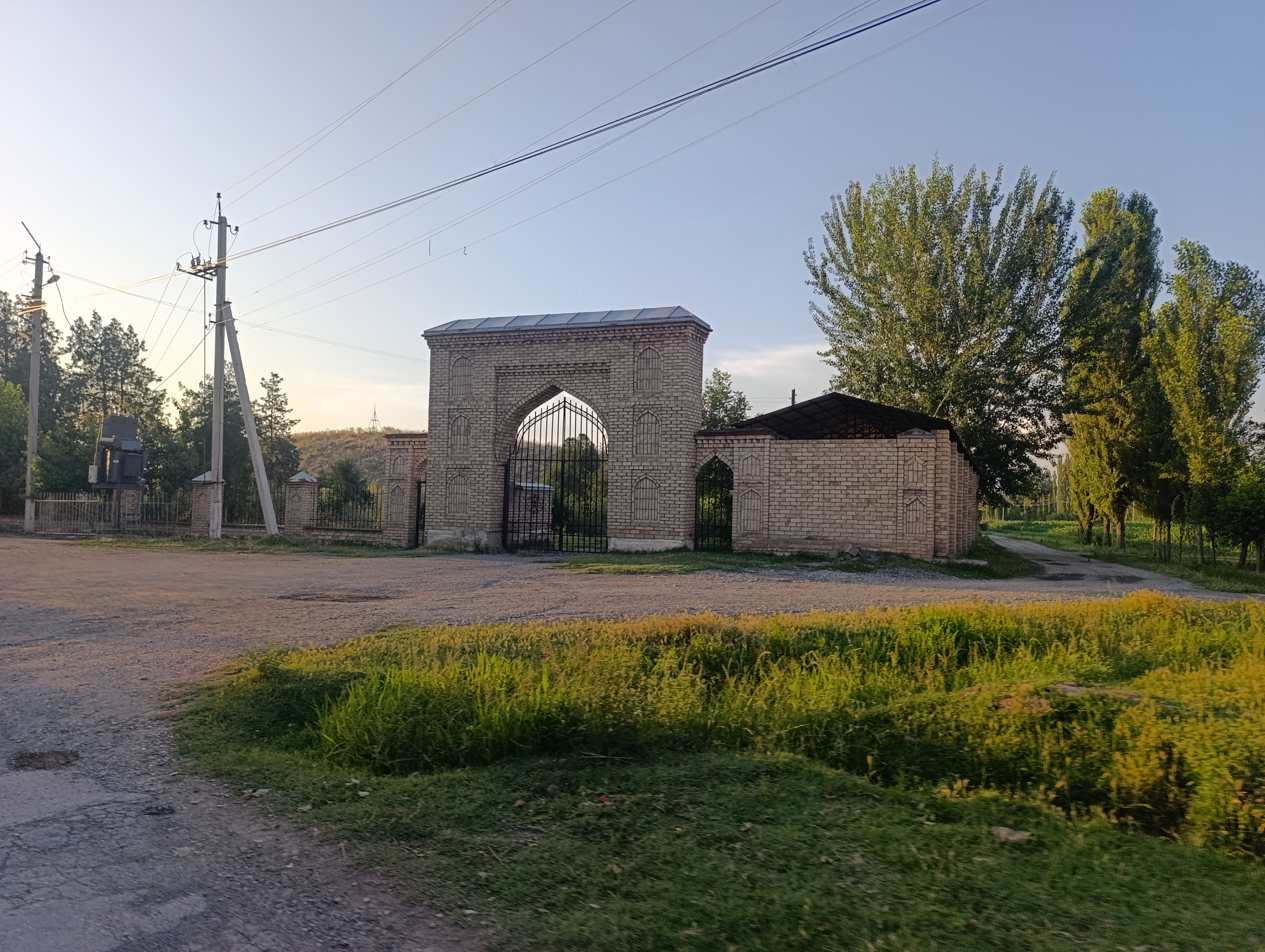

- Location in Kyrgyzstan
- Coordinates: 40°52′30″N 72°57′30″E
- Country: Kyrgyzstan
- Region: Jalal-Abad
- District: Suzak

Population (2021)
  - Total: 3,302

Totuya (Kyrgyz: Тотуя) is a village in Suzak District, Jalal-Abad Region, Kyrgyzstan. Its population was 3,302 in 2021.
