= Sadda, Suzak District =

Sadda Садда
- Village
- Location in Kyrgyzstan
- Coordinates: 40°56′05″N 72°54′40″E
- Country: Kyrgyzstan
- Region: Jalal-Abad Region
- District: Suzak District

Population (2021)
  - Total: 1,166
- Time zone: UTC+6

Sadda is a village in Suzak District, Jalal-Abad Region, Kyrgyzstan. Its population was 1,166 in 2021.
