= Oktyabr', Jalal-Abad Region =

Oktyabr' Октябрь
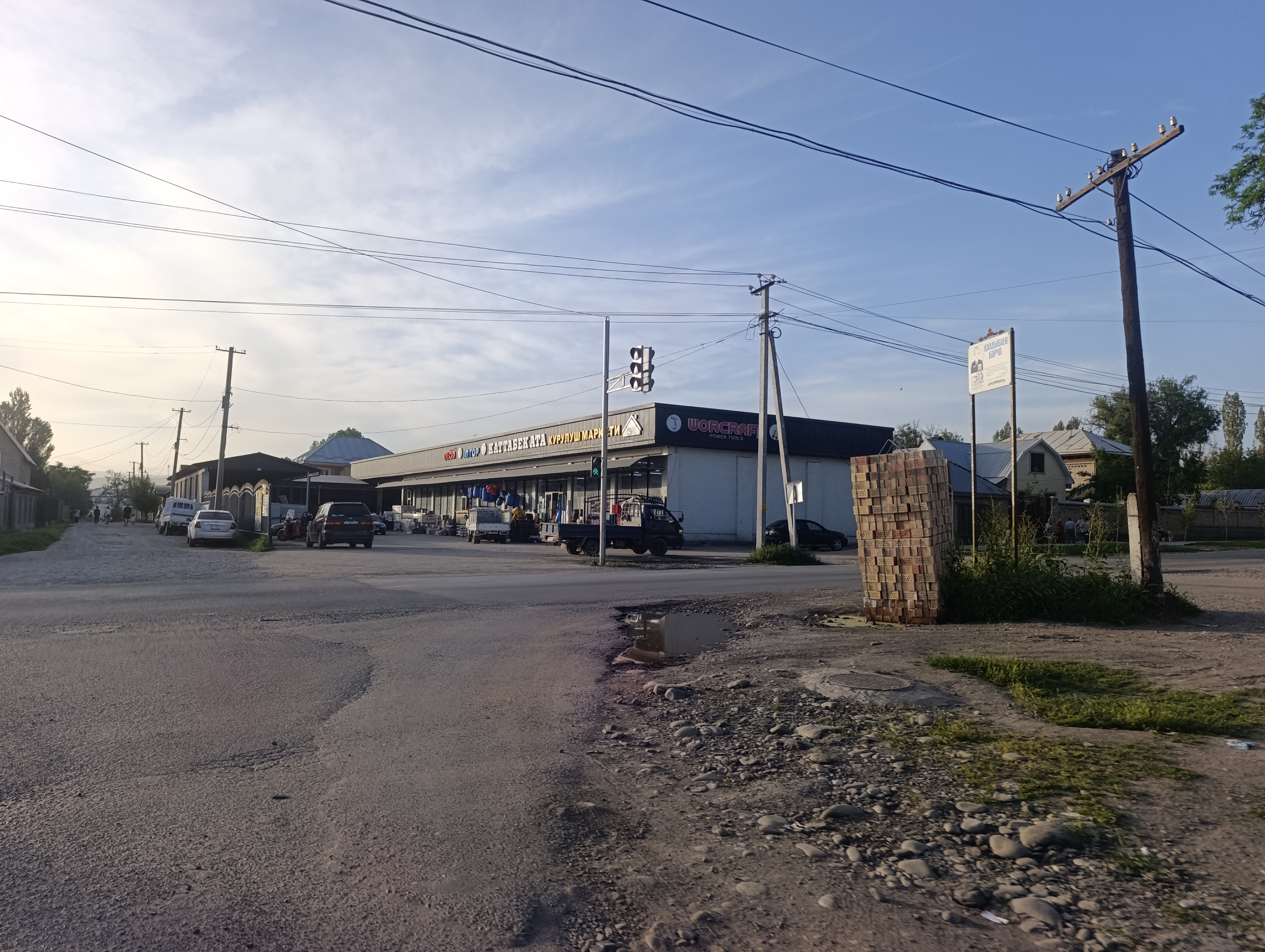

- Location within Kyrgyzstan
- Coordinates: 41°2′40″N 73°6′20″E
- Country: Kyrgyzstan
- Region: Jalal-Abad
- District: Suzak
- Kök-Janggak: 1905
- Ivanovka: 1910
- Oktyabr': 1923
- Named for: October Revolution

Population (2021)
  - Total: 10,665
- Time zone: UTC+6

Oktyabr' (Kyrgyz: Октябрь) is a big village in Jalal-Abad Region of Kyrgyzstan. It is part of the Suzak District. Its population was 10,665 in 2021.

== History ==
The village was established in summer 1905. In spring 1906, several tens of migrant families from Ukraine, Siberia and Don settled down in the area. As an aryk for drinking and irrigation was constructed from Kök-Janggak, a new village was originally linked with and named after this settlement. On 26 September 1910, the village that grew up to 149 households was renamed to Ivanovka for one of the first migrants. In autumn 2010, the land surveyors documented a settlement with irrigated land and pastures including four streets, shop, school and church. In 1923, three new streets were documented. In February 1923, the settlement was renamed to Octyabr' after the October Revolution. At that time it was populated mostly by Russians and Ukrainians. In 1933, the railway from Jalal-Abad to Kök-Janggak was built through the settlement.

== Population ==
Historical population
| Year | Pop. | ±% p.a. |
|---|---|---|
| 2009 | 8,958 | — |
| 2021 | 10,665 | +1.46% |
Note: resident population; Sources:
