= Kök-Janggak =

Kök-Janggak Көк-Жаңгак
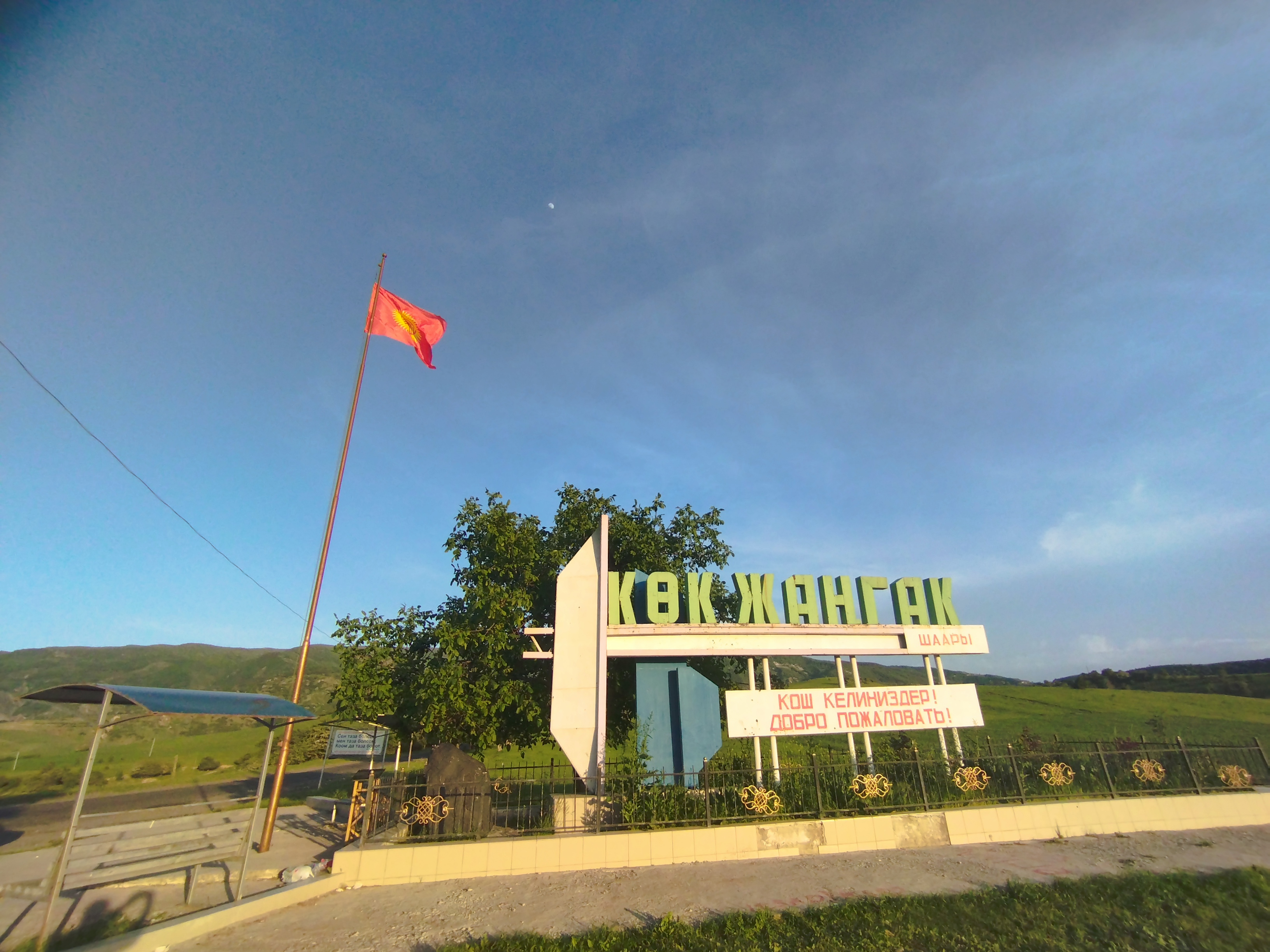

- Location in Kyrgyzstan
- Coordinates: 41°02′N 73°12′E
- Country: Kyrgyzstan
- Region: Jalal-Abad Region
- District: Suzak District
- Established: 1896; 1943 as a town

Area
  - Total: 12.13 km^{2} (4.68 sq mi)
- Highest elevation: 1,450 m (4,760 ft)
- Lowest elevation: 1,200 m (3,900 ft)

Population (2021)
  - Total: 12,117
- Website: https://citykr.kg/kokjangak.php

Kök-Janggak (Kyrgyz: Көк-жаңгак or Көкжаңгак, meaning "blue walnut" in Kyrgyz and Uzbek, Russian: Кок-Янгак Kok-Yangak) is a city in Jalal-Abad Region in western Kyrgyzstan, located at a distance of about 29 km from the regional centre city Jalal-Abad. The town lies on the southwestern foothills of the Fergana Range, along the Korgontash River—a left tributary of the Kögart river. It is situated at an elevation of approximately 1,350–1,590 meters above sea level and is set within a scenic landscape characterized by walnut–fruit forests. Its population was 12,117 in 2021. It is a city of regional significance within the Suzak District.

== History ==
Kök-Janggak was founded as a village in 1896. Remains of the old settlement are preserved on the southwestern outskirts of the town, 4–5 km away at the foot of the mountains. Coal mining began in 1910. The upper strata of coal of the Kok-Yangak coal deposit were mined on a small scale until the October Revolution. During the Civil War in Russia the mine was destroyed by basmachi and extraction was suspended. During the first five-year plan new drift mines were developed and an access railroad from Jalal-Abad was built in 1931, resulting in a rapid increase in coal production. In 1932, the “ Kök-Janggak Coal” mining administration was established. In 1943 Kök-Janggak became a town.

== Climate ==
The climate is mild in winter (average January temperature down to −10 °C) and cool in summer (average July temperature about 20 °C). Average annual precipitation is around 450 mm, falling mainly in winter and spring.

== Population ==
In 1958, the population reached approximately 27,000; by 2004, the population of Kök-Janggak had declined to 10,341 including 8,400 - Kyrgyz, 640 - Uzbek, 540 - Russian, 320 - Kurds, 210 - Tatar, 140 - Kazakh, and 411 - other nationalities.

Historical population
Year	Pop.	±% p.a.
1958	27,000	—
1970	16,268	−4.13%
1979	17,281	+0.67%
1989	18,837	+0.87%
1999	10,727	−5.48%
2009	10,451	−0.26%
2021	12,117	+1.24%
Note: resident population; Sources:
