= Kümüsh-Aziz =

Kümüsh-Aziz Күмүш-Азиз
- Location in Kyrgyzstan
- Coordinates: 40°53′45″N 72°55′20″E
- Country: Kyrgyzstan
- Region: Jalal-Abad Region
- District: Suzak District

Population (2021)
  - Total: 6,446

Kümüsh-Aziz is a village in Suzak District, Jalal-Abad Region, Kyrgyzstan. Its population was 6,446 in 2021.

== Population ==
Historical population
| Year | Pop. | ±% p.a. |
|---|---|---|
| 2009 | 4,302 | — |
| 2021 | 6,446 | +3.43% |
Note: resident population; Sources:
