= Kamysh-Bashy =

Kamysh-Bashy Камыш-Башы
- Location in Kyrgyzstan
- Coordinates: 40°56′10″N 72°55′50″E
- Country: Kyrgyzstan
- Region: Jalal-Abad Region
- District: Suzak District

Population (2021)
  - Total: 1,736

Kamysh-Bashy is a village in Suzak District, Jalal-Abad Region, Kyrgyzstan. Its population was 1,736 in 2021.
