= Orto-Say =

Orto-Say Орто-Сай
- village
- Location in Kyrgyzstan
- Coordinates: 42°48′18″N 74°35′50″E
- Country: Kyrgyzstan
- Region: Bishkek
- District: Lenin District

Population (2022)
  - Total: 6,243
- Time zone: UTC+6 (KGT)

Orto-Say (Kyrgyz: Орто-Сай) is a village in northern Kyrgyzstan. Its population was 4111 in 2009 and 6243 in 2022. The village is administratively subordinated to the Lenin District within the city of Bishkek.
