= Kara-Alma =

Kara-Alma Кара-Алма
- Village
- Location in Kyrgyzstan
- Coordinates: 41°12′36″N 73°20′12″E
- Country: Kyrgyzstan
- Region: Jalal-Abad Region
- District: Suzak District

Population
  - Total: 2,918
- Time zone: UTC+6

Kara-Alma (Kyrgyz: Кара-Алма) is a village in Suzak District, Jalal-Abad Region, Kyrgyzstan. Its population was 2,918 in 2021.
