= Chong-Aryk, Bishkek =

Chong-Aryk Чоң-Арык
- urban-type settlement
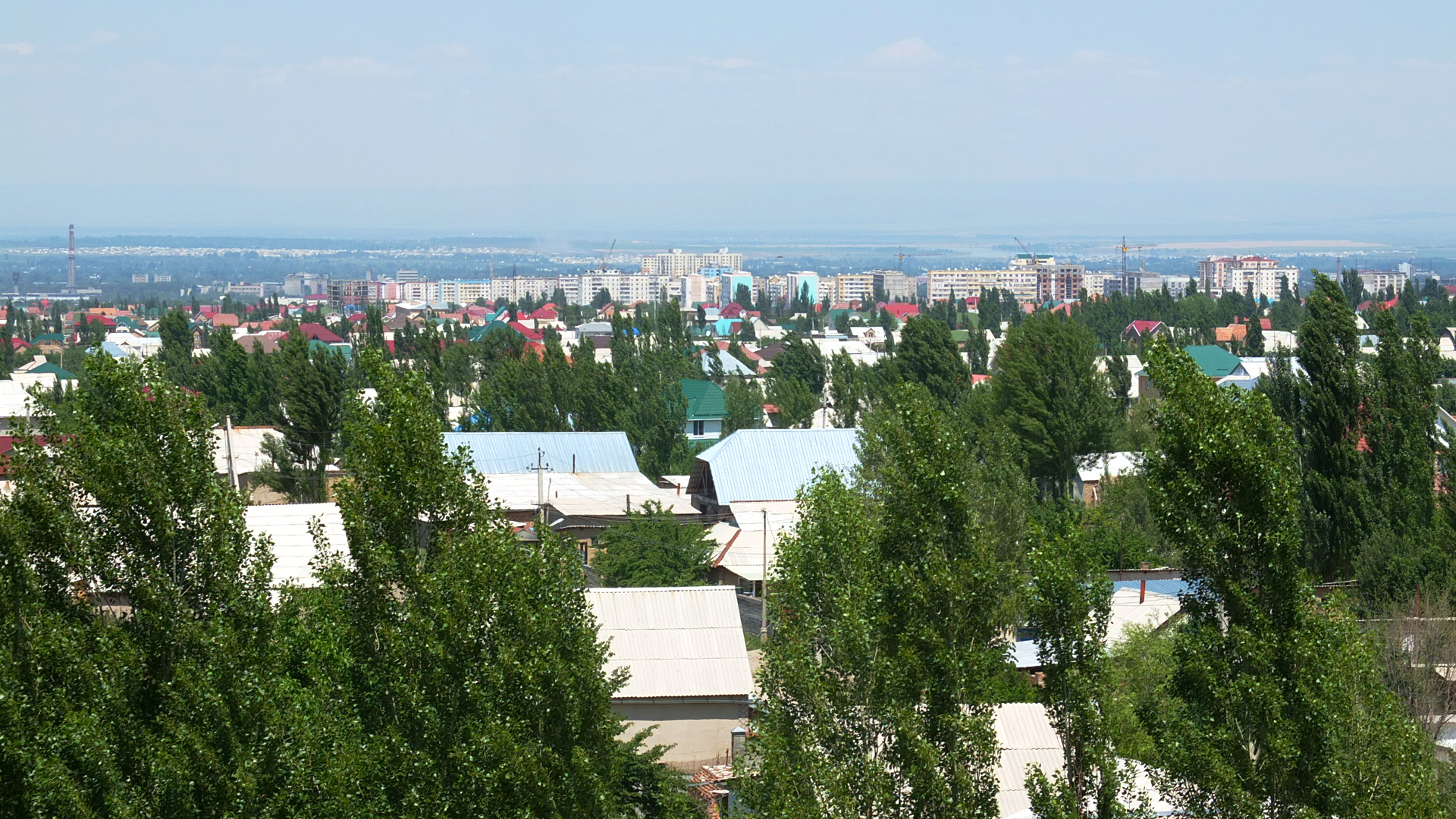

- Location in Kyrgyzstan
- Coordinates: 42°48′50″N 74°34′21″E
- Country: Kyrgyzstan
- Region: Bishkek
- District: Lenin District

Population (2021)
  - Total: 10,317
- Time zone: UTC+6 (KGT)

Chong-Aryk (Kyrgyz: Чоң-Арык) is an urban-type settlement in northern Kyrgyzstan. Its population was 10,317 in 2021. The town is administratively subordinated to the Lenin District within the city of Bishkek. The town is home to the Ala Archa State Residence.

== Population ==
Historical population
Year	Pop.	±% p.a.
1970	6,197	—
1979	6,459	+0.46%
1989	6,226	−0.37%
1999	7,877	+2.38%
2009	9,717	+2.12%
2021	10,317	+0.50%
Note: resident population; Sources:
