= Aral, Suzak District =

Aral Арал
- Location in Kyrgyzstan
- Coordinates: 40°52′0″N 72°55′10″E
- Country: Kyrgyzstan
- Region: Jalal-Abad Region
- District: Suzak District

Population (2021)
  - Total: 2,463

Aral is a village near Suzak in Suzak District, Jalal-Abad Region, Kyrgyzstan. Its population was 2,463 in 2021.
