= Masadan =

Masadan Тейит айылы
- Village
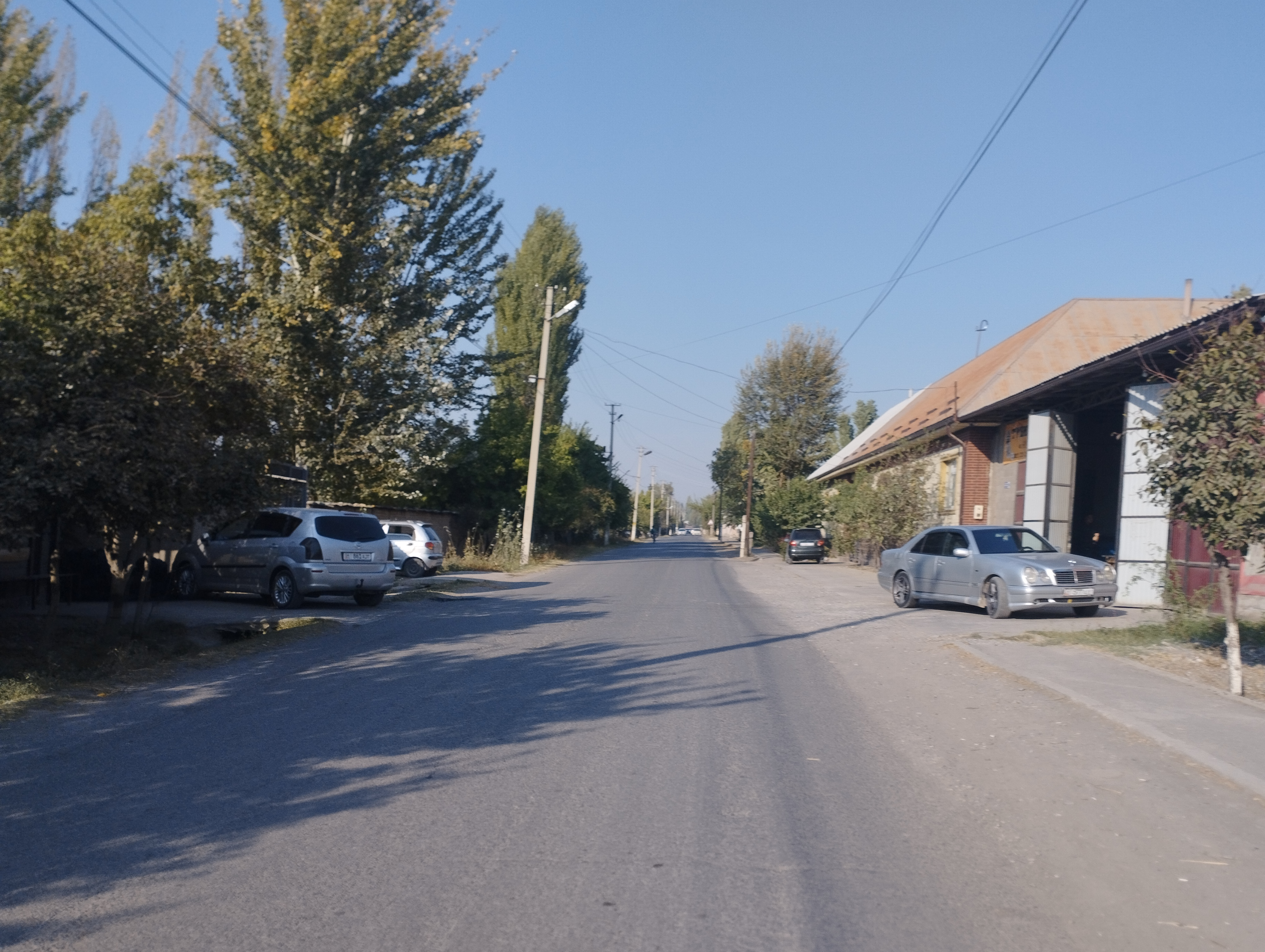

- Location within Kyrgyzstan
- Coordinates: 40°53′52″N 72°58′09″E
- Country: Kyrgyzstan
- Region: Jalal-Abad
- District: Suzak

Population (2021)
  - Total: 2,391
- Time zone: UTC+6

Masadan (Russian: Масадан; Kyrgyz: Тейит айылы) is a village in Jalal-Abad Region in Kyrgyzstan. It is part of the Suzak District. Its population was 2,391 in 2021. It is the birthplace of the former president of the Kyrgyz Republic, Kurmanbek Bakiyev. Masadan is also called Teit. The village is located to the south-west of Jalal-Abad city, near the border with Uzbekistan.
