= Sverdlov District, Bishkek =

District of Bishkek

Sverdlov District: Свердлов району (Kyrgyz); Свердловский район (Russian)
- district
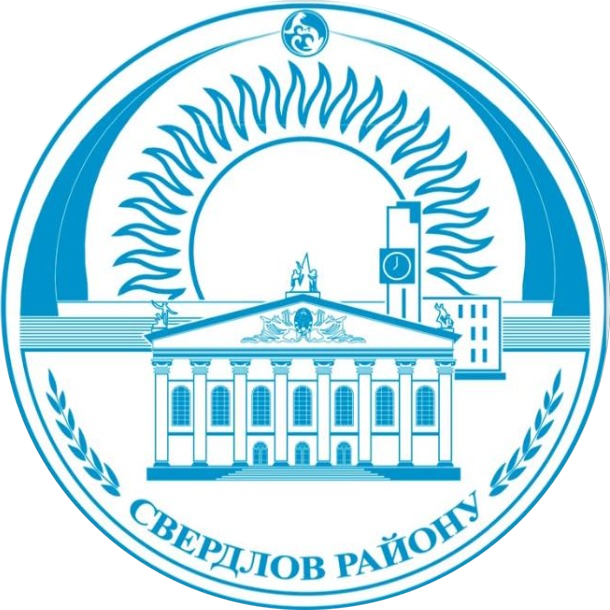
- Coat of arms

- Location within Kyrgyzstan
- Coordinates: 42°53′N 74°38′E
- Country: Kyrgyzstan
- Region: Bishkek City

Population (2009)
  - Total: 214,100

The Sverdlov District (Kyrgyz: Свердлов району, romanized: Sverdlov rayonu, Russian: Свердловский район, romanized: Sverdlovskiy rayon) is a district of the capital city of Bishkek in northern Kyrgyzstan. Its resident population was 214,100 in 2009. It covers the northeastern part of the city, including the residential area Krasny Stroitel.

== Demographics ==
Historical populations in Sverdlov District
Year	Pop.	±% p.a.
1970	102,280	—
1979	132,575	+2.92%
1989	179,018	+3.05%
1999	204,485	+1.34%
2009	214,100	+0.46%
Note: resident population; Source:

=== Ethnic composition ===
According to the 2009 Census, the ethnic composition (residential population) of the Sverdlov District was:

Ethnic group	Proportion
Kyrgyzs	60.3%
Russians	24.7%
Uyghurs	3.9%
Uzbeks	2.0%
Tatars	1.9%
Koreans	1.3%
Kazakhs	1.2%
Ukrainians	1.0%
Dungans	0.7%
other groups	3.6%
