= Aral, Azerbaijan =

Aral, Azerbaijan may refer to:

- Birinci Aral
- İkinci Aral
