= Kachkynchy =

Kachkynchy Качкынчы
- Location within Kyrgyzstan
- Coordinates: 41°0′36″N 73°3′0″E
- Country: Kyrgyzstan
- Region: Jalal-Abad Region
- City: Jalal-Abad
- Elevation: 889 m (2,917 ft)

Population (2021)
  - Total: 4,468
- Time zone: UTC+6

Kachkynchy is a village in Jalal-Abad Region of Kyrgyzstan. Its population was 4,468 in 2021. Administratively, it is part of the city Jalal-Abad.
