= Bek-Abad, Jalal-Abad Region =

Village in Suzak District, Jalal-Abad Region, Kyrgyzstan

Bek-Abad Бек-Абад
- Village
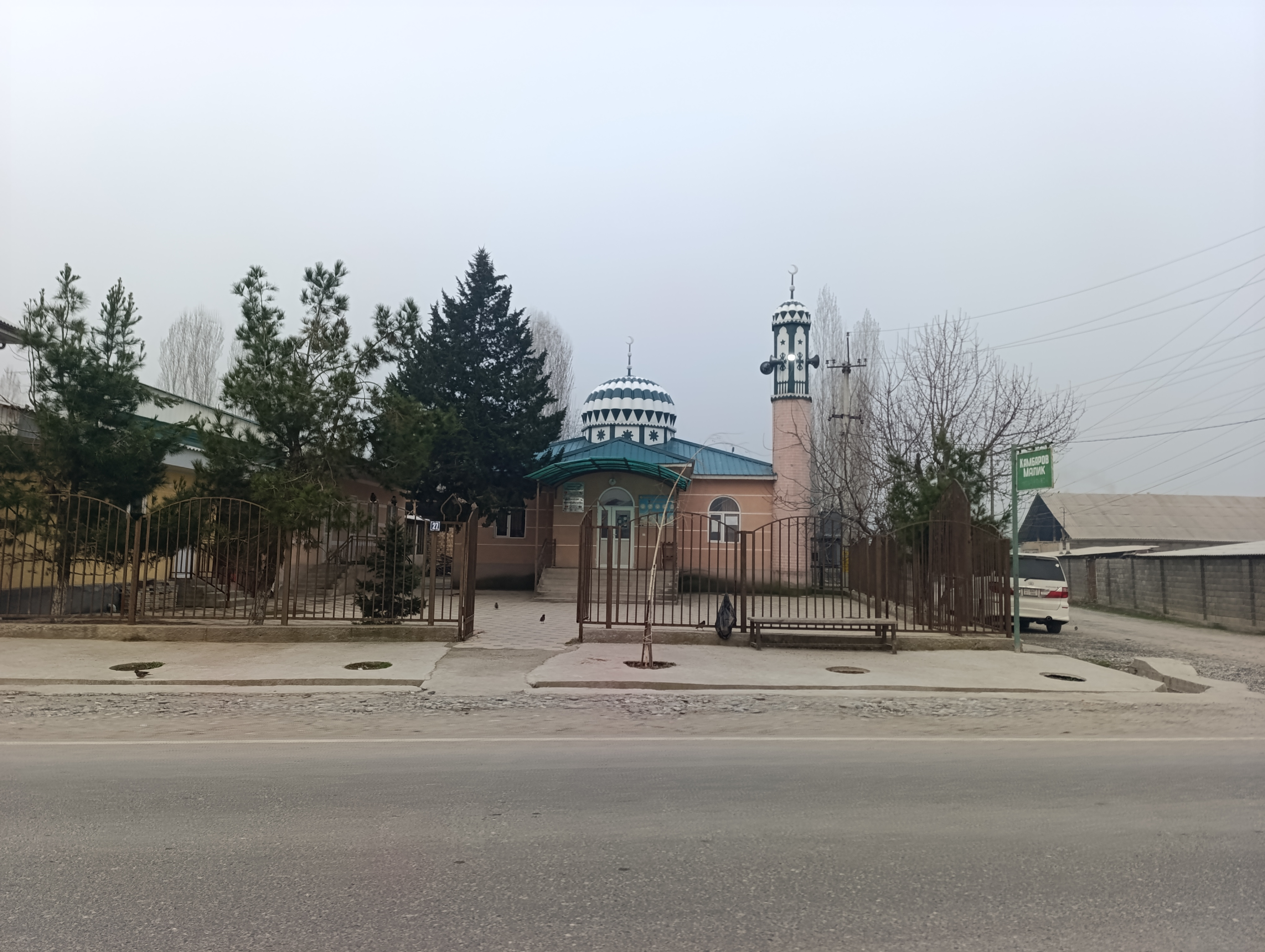

- Location in Kyrgyzstan
- Coordinates: 40°50′50″N 72°58′30″E
- Country: Kyrgyzstan
- Region: Jalal-Abad Region
- District: Suzak District

Population (2021)
  - Total: 11,476

Bek-Abad (Kyrgyz: Бек-Абад; Uzbek: Bekobod/Бекобод) is a village in Suzak District, Jalal-Abad Region, Kyrgyzstan. Its population was 11,476 in 2021.

== Population ==
Historical population
Year	Pop.	±% p.a.
2009	9,485	—
2021	11,476	+1.60%
Note: resident population; Sources:
