= Lenin District, Bishkek =

Lenin District Ленин району, Түштүк-Батыш ооданы South-West Side
- district
- Ленин району, Lenin District
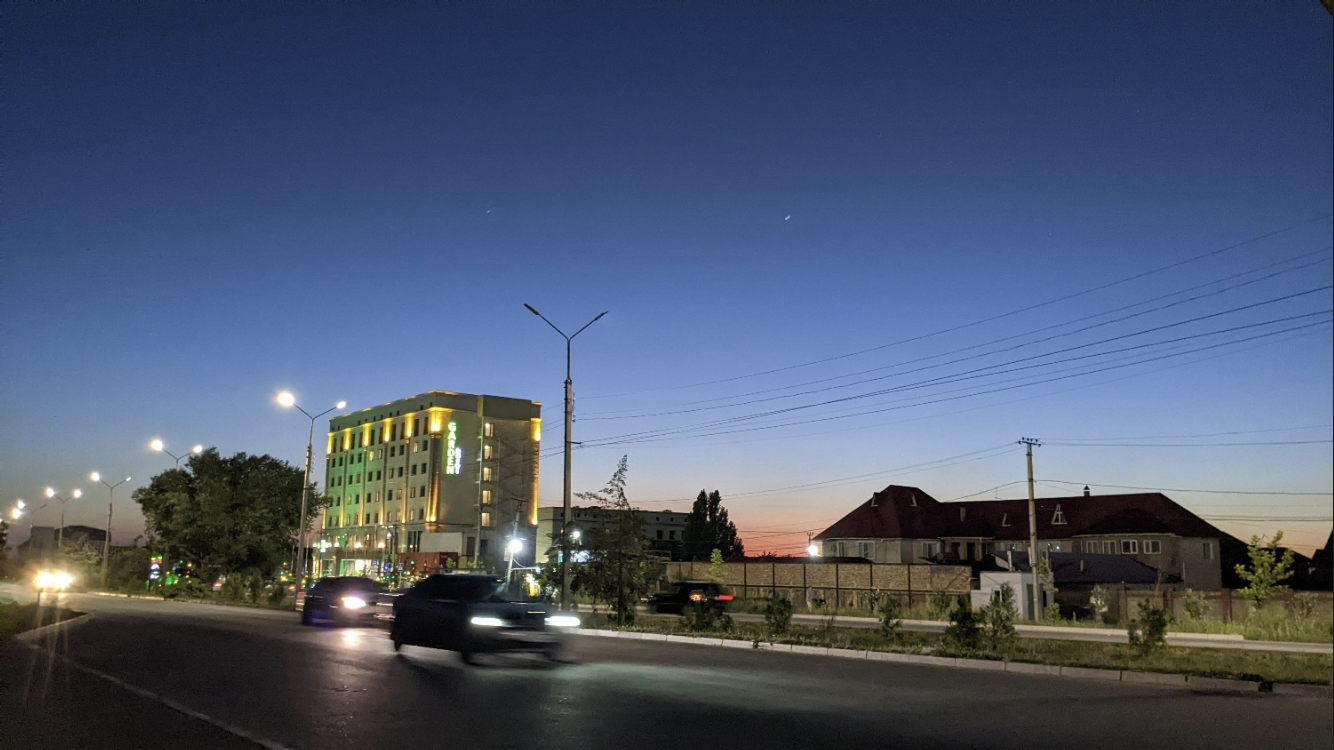
- Archa-Beshik at night.

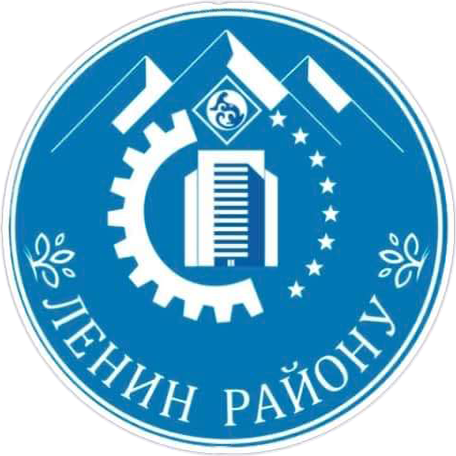
- Coat of arms

- Location within Kyrgyzstan
- Coordinates: 42°51′N 74°34′E
- Country: Kyrgyzstan
- Region: Bishkek City
- Established: 18.07.2023

Government
  - Akim: Jyrgalbek Shakiev

Population (2017)
  - Total: 235,000
- Time zone: UTC+6
- Website: Website in Bishkek.Gov

The Lenin District (Kyrgyz: Ленин району, romanized: Lenin rayonu, Russian: Ленинский район, Юго-Запад) is a district of the capital city of Bishkek in northern Kyrgyzstan. Its resident population was 198,019 in 2009. It covers the southwestern part of the city, and includes the urban-type settlement Chong-Aryk and the village Orto-Say. It's named after Vladimir Lenin.

== Demographics ==
Historical populations in Lenin District
Year	Pop.	±% p.a.
1970	103,833	—
1979	132,181	+2.72%
1989	138,084	+0.44%
1999	185,095	+2.97%
2009	198,019	+0.68%
Note: resident population; Source:

=== Ethnic composition ===
According to the 2009 Census, the ethnic composition (residential population) of the Lenin District was:

Ethnic group	Proportion
Kyrgyzs	75.4%
Russians	17.6%
Tatars	0.9%
Kazakhs	0.9%
Uzbeks	0.8%
Koreans	0.8%
other groups	3.6%
