= Aral, Kara-Darya =

Aral Арал
- Location in Kyrgyzstan
- Coordinates: 40°51′15″N 72°41′0″E
- Country: Kyrgyzstan
- Region: Jalal-Abad
- District: Suzak

Population (2021)
  - Total: 6,574

Aral is a village in Kara-Daryya rural community, in the western part of the Suzak District, Jalal-Abad Region, Kyrgyzstan. Its population was 6,574 in 2021.

== Population ==
Historical population
| Year | Pop. | ±% p.a. |
|---|---|---|
| 2009 | 5,398 | — |
| 2021 | 6,574 | +1.66% |
Note: resident population; Sources:
