= Krasny Stroitel =

- Location within Kyrgyzstan
- Coordinates: 42°55′48″N 74°35′24″E
- Country: Kyrgyzstan
- Region: Bishkek City
- District: Sverdlov District
- Elevation: 685 m (2,247 ft)

Krasny Stroitel is an industrial and residential area in the city of Bishkek of Kyrgyzstan. It is part of the Sverdlov District.
