= Bekabad (disambiguation) =

Bekabad may refer to:

- Bek-Abad, a village in Jalal-Abad Province, Kyrgyzstan
- Bekabad, a town in Tashkent Region, Uzbekistan
- Bekobod, Namangan, a village in Yangikurgan District, Namangan Region, Uzbekistan
