= Boston, Suzak =

Boston Бостон
- Location within Kyrgyzstan
- Coordinates: 41°1′48″N 72°57′36″E
- Country: Kyrgyzstan
- Region: Jalal-Abad
- District: Suzak
- Elevation: 850 m (2,790 ft)

Population (2021)
  - Total: 2,713
- Time zone: UTC+6

Boston is a village in Jalal-Abad Region of Kyrgyzstan. It is part of the Suzak District. Its population was 2,713 in 2021.
