= Kyzyl-Sengir =

Kyzyl-Sengir Кызыл-Сеңир
- Location within Kyrgyzstan
- Coordinates: 41°2′30″N 73°0′10″E
- Country: Kyrgyzstan
- Region: Jalal-Abad
- District: Suzak

Population (2021)
  - Total: 3,612
- Time zone: UTC+6

Kyzyl-Sengir (Kyrgyz: Кызыл-Сеңир) is a village in Jalal-Abad Region of Kyrgyzstan. It is part of the Suzak District. Its population was 3,612 in 2021.
