= Töölös =

Töölös Төөлөс
- Location within Kyrgyzstan
- Coordinates: 40°52′20″N 73°3′40″E
- Country: Kyrgyzstan
- Region: Jalal-Abad
- District: Suzak

Population (2021)
  - Total: 1,070
- Time zone: UTC+6

Töölös (Kyrgyz: Төөлөс) is a village in Jalal-Abad Region of Kyrgyzstan. It is part of the Suzak District. Its population was 1,070 in 2021.
