= Bagysh =

Bagysh Багыш
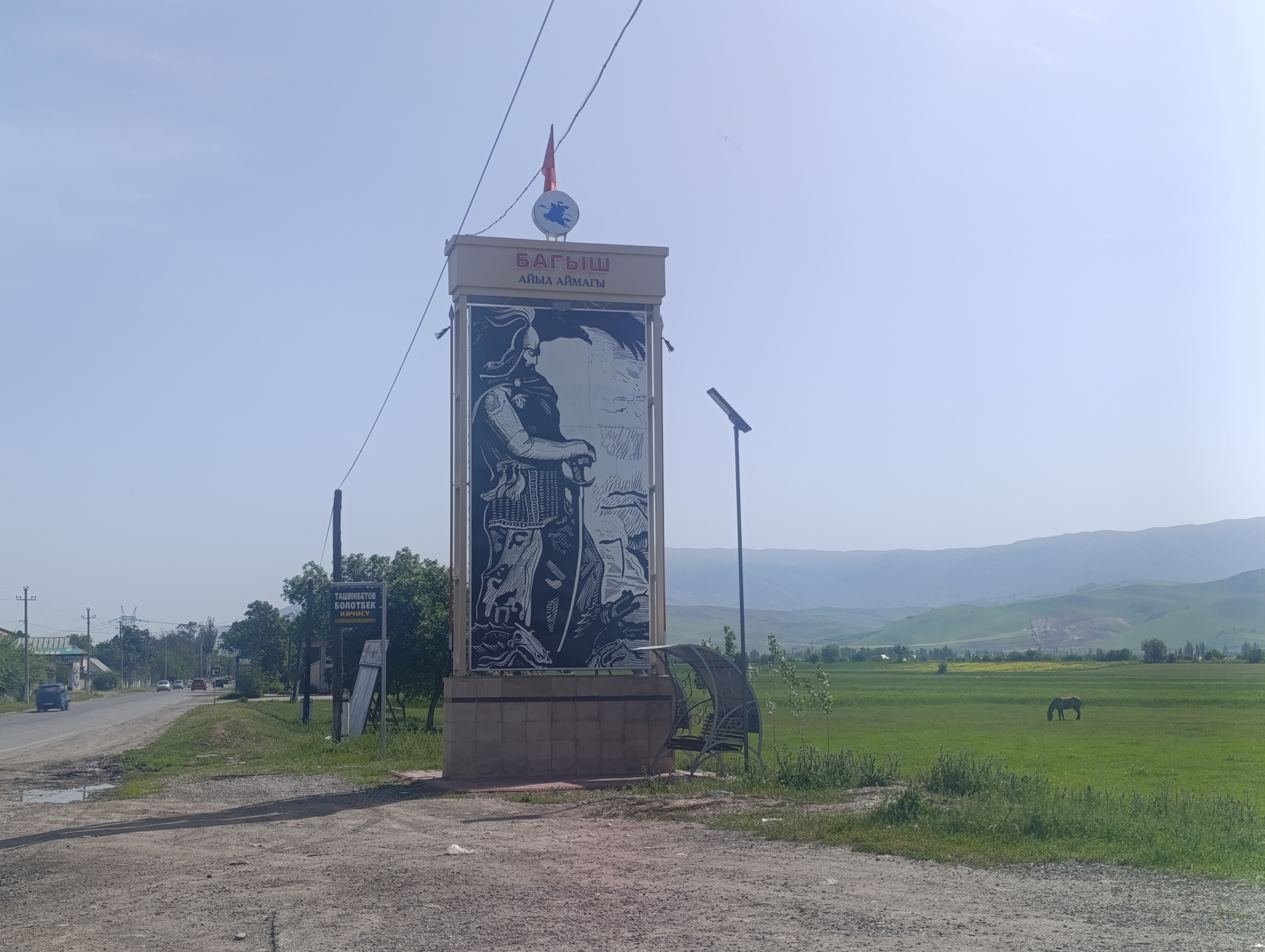

- Location within Kyrgyzstan
- Coordinates: 41°0′57″N 73°5′22″E
- Country: Kyrgyzstan
- Region: Jalal-Abad
- District: Suzak

Population (2021)
  - Total: 2,963
- Time zone: UTC+6

Bagysh (Kyrgyz: Багыш) is a village in Jalal-Abad Region of Kyrgyzstan. It is part of the Suzak District. The village's population was 2,963 in 2021.

== Population ==
Historical population
Year	Pop.	±% p.a.
2009	2,405	—
2021	2,963	+1.75%
Note: resident population; Sources:
