= Ak-Bash =

Ak-Bash Ак-Баш
- Location within Kyrgyzstan
- Coordinates: 41°0′36″N 72°58′48″E
- Country: Kyrgyzstan
- Region: Jalal-Abad
- District: Suzak
- Elevation: 860 m (2,820 ft)

Population (2021)
  - Total: 3,186
- Time zone: UTC+6

Ak-Bash (Kyrgyz: Ак-Баш, formerly: Spasovka) is a village in Jalal-Abad Region of Kyrgyzstan. It is part of the Suzak District. Its population was 3,186 in 2021.
