= Kyz-Köl =

- Location within Kyrgyzstan
- Coordinates: 41°7′30″N 73°5′30″E
- Country: Kyrgyzstan
- Region: Jalal-Abad
- District: Suzak

Population (2021)
  - Total: 1,190
- Time zone: UTC+6

Kyz-Köl is a village in Jalal-Abad Region of Kyrgyzstan. It is part of the Suzak District. Its population was 1,190 in 2021.
