= Besh-Bala =

Besh-Bala Беш-Бала
- Location within Kyrgyzstan
- Coordinates: 41°01′22″N 73°4′50″E
- Country: Kyrgyzstan
- Region: Jalal-Abad
- District: Suzak
- Elevation: 936 m (3,071 ft)

Population (2021)
  - Total: 1,810
- Time zone: UTC+6

Besh-Bala (Kyrgyz: Беш-Бала) is a village in Jalal-Abad Region of Kyrgyzstan. It is part of the Suzak District. The village's population was 1,810 in 2021.

== Population ==
Historical population
Year	Pop.	±% p.a.
2009	1,681	—
2021	1,810	+0.62%
Note: resident population; Sources:
