= Achy, Jalal-Abad =

Achy Ачы
- Location within Kyrgyzstan
- Coordinates: 40°54′50″N 73°12′10″E
- Country: Kyrgyzstan
- Region: Jalal-Abad
- District: Suzak
- Elevation: 995 m (3,264 ft)

Population (2021)
  - Total: 520
- Time zone: UTC+6

Achy (Kyrgyz: Ачы) is a village in the Jalal-Abad Region of Kyrgyzstan. It is part of the Suzak District. Its population was 520 in 2021.
