= Mikhaylovka, Jalal-Abad =

Mikhaylovka Михайловка
- Location within Kyrgyzstan
- Coordinates: 41°06′00″N 73°13′30″E
- Country: Kyrgyzstan
- Region: Jalal-Abad
- District: Suzak

Population (2021)
  - Total: 6,488
- Time zone: UTC+6

Mikhaylovka (Kyrgyz: Михайловка) is a village in Jalal-Abad Region of Kyrgyzstan. It is part of the Suzak District. Its population was 6,488 in 2021.

== Population ==
Historical population
Year	Pop.	±% p.a.
2009	5,055	—
2021	6,488	+2.10%
Note: resident population; Sources:
