= Kurgak-Köl =

Kurgak-Köl Кургак-Көл
- Location within Kyrgyzstan
- Coordinates: 40°52′50″N 72°55′20″E
- Country: Kyrgyzstan
- Region: Jalal-Abad
- District: Suzak

Population (2021)
  - Total: 5,794
- Time zone: UTC+6

Kurgak-Köl (Kyrgyz: Кургак-Көл) is a village in Jalal-Abad Region of Kyrgyzstan. It is part of the Suzak District. Its population was 5,794 in 2021.

== Population ==
Historical population
Year	Pop.	±% p.a.
2009	4,605	—
2021	5,794	+1.93%
Note: resident population; Sources:
