= Gülstan, Jalal-Abad =

Gülstan Гүлстан
- Location within Kyrgyzstan
- Coordinates: 40°58′40″N 73°00′10″E
- Country: Kyrgyzstan
- Region: Jalal-Abad
- District: Suzak

Population (2021)
  - Total: 6,145
- Time zone: UTC+6

Gülstan (Kyrgyz: Гүлстан) is a village in Jalal-Abad Region of Kyrgyzstan. It is part of the Suzak District. Its population was 6,145 in 2021.

== Population ==
Historical population
Year	Pop.	±% p.a.
2009	4,925	—
2021	6,145	+1.86%
Note: resident population; Sources:
