= Suzak =

Suzak Сузак
- Village
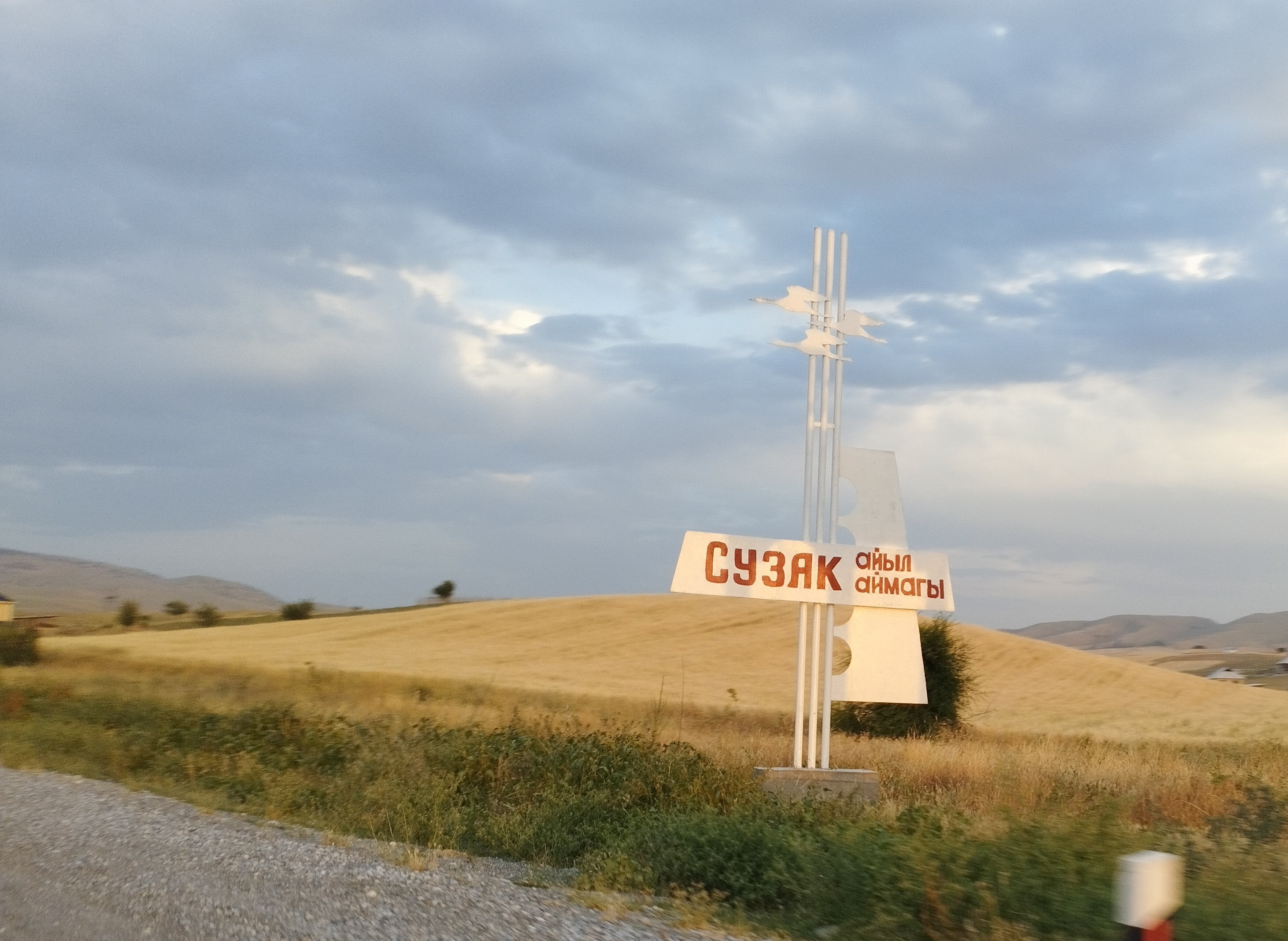

- Location in Kyrgyzstan
- Coordinates: 40°53′53″N 72°54′17″E
- Country: Kyrgyzstan
- Region: Jalal-Abad Region
- District: Suzak District
- First mention: 1874
- Elevation: 695 m (2,280 ft)

Population (2021)
  - Total: 30,534
- Time zone: UTC+6 (KGT)
- Postal code: 721300
- Area code: +996 3748

Suzak (/ˈsuːzæk/; Kyrgyz: Сузак [sʊzɑ́q]) is a village in Jalal-Abad Region, Kyrgyzstan. Its population was 30,534 in 2021. It is the administrative seat of Suzak District.

== History ==
The first mention of Suzak village is known from a map of Eugene Schuyler "Map of the Khanates of Bukhara, Khiva, and Kokand and Part of Russian Turkestan" of 1875.

In 1998 a catastrophic flood of the river Kögart destroyed around 1,000 dwellings in Suzak.

== Demographics ==
Historical population
Year	Pop.	±% p.a.
1985	15,011	—
2009	24,049	+1.98%
2021	30,534	+2.01%
Note: resident population; Sources:

== Elections in Suzak ==
Suzak, in addition, has anomalously high "Against All" voter turnout. Yet most anomalous are the results from Kara-Suu and Suzak both. These districts are not urban, being most rural, and are located along the Kyrgyzstan-Uzbekistan border. Because these areas lack significant population, widespread higher education, or any notable Russian populations, it appears that "the established explanatory model fails to fully account for what happened in these two areas. Instead of demographic characteristics, we must instead take into account the recent political history in order to understand why the people in Kara-Suu and Suzak might have voted in such high numbers 'against all.'".
