= Komsomol, Kyrgyzstan =

Komsomol Комсомол
- Location within Kyrgyzstan
- Coordinates: 41°05′10″N 73°11′30″E
- Country: Kyrgyzstan
- Region: Jalal-Abad
- District: Suzak

Population (2021)
  - Total: 5,237
- Time zone: UTC+6

Komsomol (Kyrgyz: Комсомол) is a village in Jalal-Abad Region of Kyrgyzstan. It is part of the Suzak District. Its population was 5,237 in 2021.

== Population ==
Historical population
Year	Pop.	±% p.a.
2009	3,902	—
2021	5,237	+2.48%
Note: resident population; Sources:
