= Tash-Bulak, Suzak =

Tash-Bulak
- Location within Kyrgyzstan
- Coordinates: 40°57′20″N 73°1′10″E
- Country: Kyrgyzstan
- Region: Jalal-Abad
- District: Suzak

Population (2021)
  - Total: 8,448
- Time zone: UTC+6

Tash-Bulak is a village in Jalal-Abad Region of Kyrgyzstan. It is part of the Suzak District. Its population was 8,448 in 2021.

== Population ==
Historical population
| Year | Pop. | ±% p.a. |
|---|---|---|
| 2009 | 5,910 | — |
| 2021 | 8,448 | +3.02% |
Note: resident population; Sources:
