= Birinci Aral =

- Municipality
- Location within Azerbaijan
- Coordinates: 40°36′16″N 47°35′38″E
- Country: Azerbaijan
- Rayon: Agdash

Population
  - Total: 1,521
- Time zone: UTC+4 (AZT)
  - Summer (DST): UTC+5 (AZT)

Birinci Aral (also, Aral Pervoye and Aral Pervyy) is a village and municipality in the Agdash Rayon of Azerbaijan. It has a population of 1,521. The municipality consists of the villages of Birinci Aral and İkinci Aral.
