= Aral Formation =

Geologic formation in Kazakhstan

- Stratigraphic range: Oligocene – Miocene
- Type: Formation

Location
- Coordinates: 50.3° N, 57.2° E W
- Region: Aktyubinsk
- Country: Kazakhstan

The Aral Formation is a geologic formation in Kazakhstan. It preserves fossils dating back to the Neogene period. Much of its fossils consist of Glires and fish, though cetaceans and cryptobranchid salamanders are also known.

== Paleobiota ==
The Aral Formation has yielded a rich variety of extinct mammals. Many of its mammal fauna consists of the clade Glires with rodents being particularly numerous.

=== Bivalves ===
Genus	Species	Notes	Images
Corbula	C. helmerseni	A bivalve	

=== Chondrichthyes ===
Genus	Species	Notes	Images
Odontaspis	Species indeterminate	A sand tiger shark.	

=== Osteichthyes ===
Genus	Species	Notes	Images
Acipenser	Species indeterminate	A sturgeon.	
Cyprinidae indet.	Genus and species indeterminate	A carp.	
Esox	E. aralensis	A pike.	
Percidae indet.	Genus and species indeterminate	A perch.	

=== Urodela ===
Genus	Species	Notes	Images
Cryptobranchidae indet.	Genus and species indeterminate.	A giant salamander.	

=== Mammals ===
==== Rodents ====
Genus	Species	Notes	Images
Aralocricetodon	A. schokensis	A cricetid.	
Asianeomys	A. bolligeri.	An eomyid.	
Eumyarion	E. tremulus	A mouse.	
Eucricetodon	E. occasionalis	A mouse.	
Plesiosminthus	P. tereskentensis	A jumping mouse.	
Propalaeocastor	P. kumbulakensis	A castorid.	

==== Lagomorpha ====
Genus	Species	Notes	Images
Desmatolagus	D. gobiensis, D. simplex, D. periaralicus.	A rabbit.	

==== Eulipotyphla ====
Genus	Species	Notes	Images
Amphechinus	A. minimus	A hedgehog.	
Desmaninae indet.	Indeterminate genus and species.	A desman.	
Gobisorex	G. kingae.	A shrew.	
Talpidae indet.	Indeterminate genus and species.	A mole.	

==== Cetacea ====
Genus	Species	Notes	Images
Delphinidae indet.	Indeterminate genus and species.	A dolphin.	
