= Suzak District =

Coordinates: 40°55′10″N 72°56′10″E

Suzak Сузак району
- District
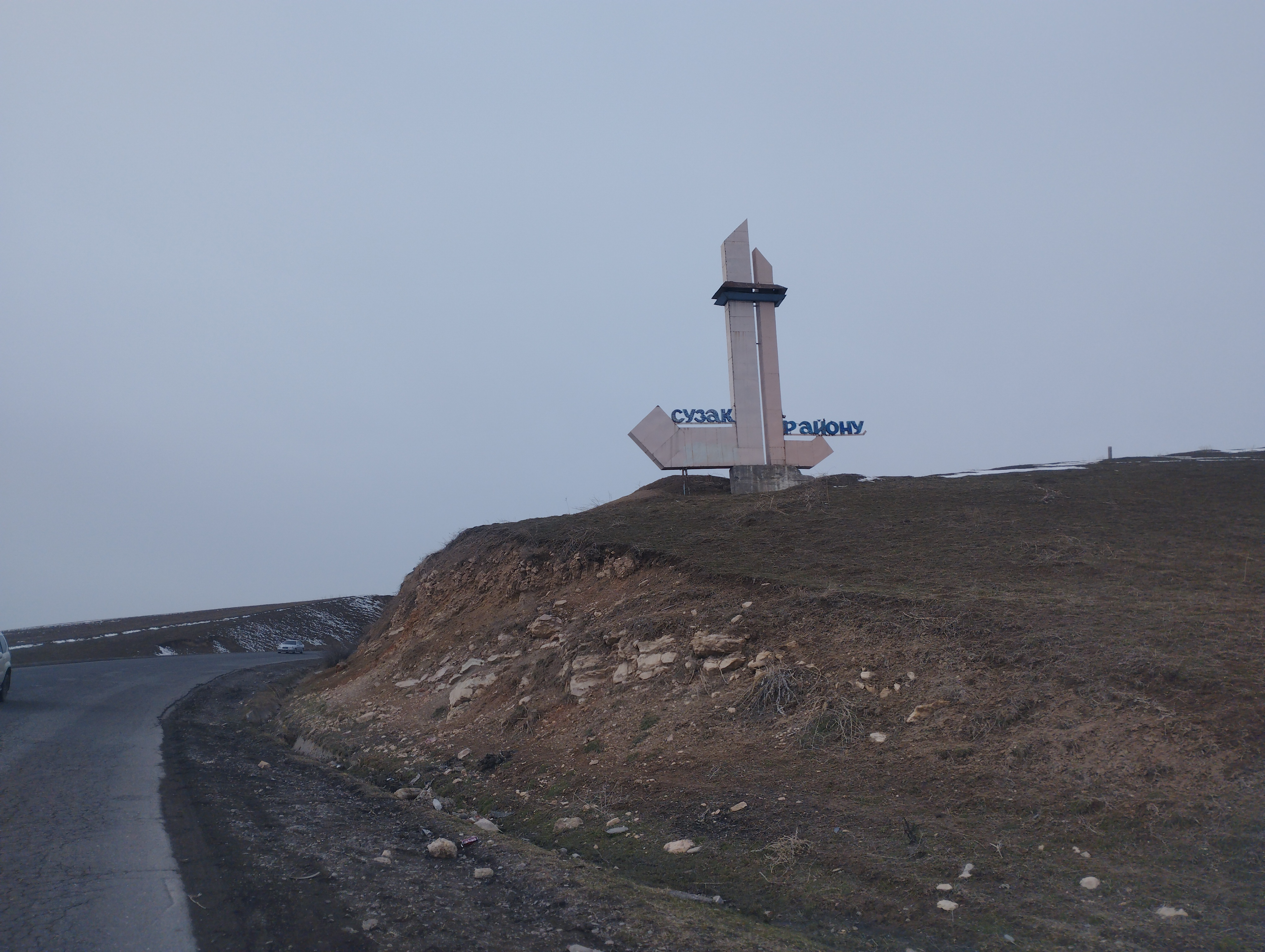

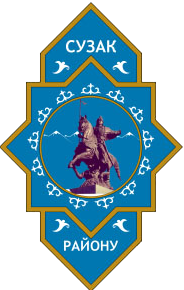
- Coat of arms

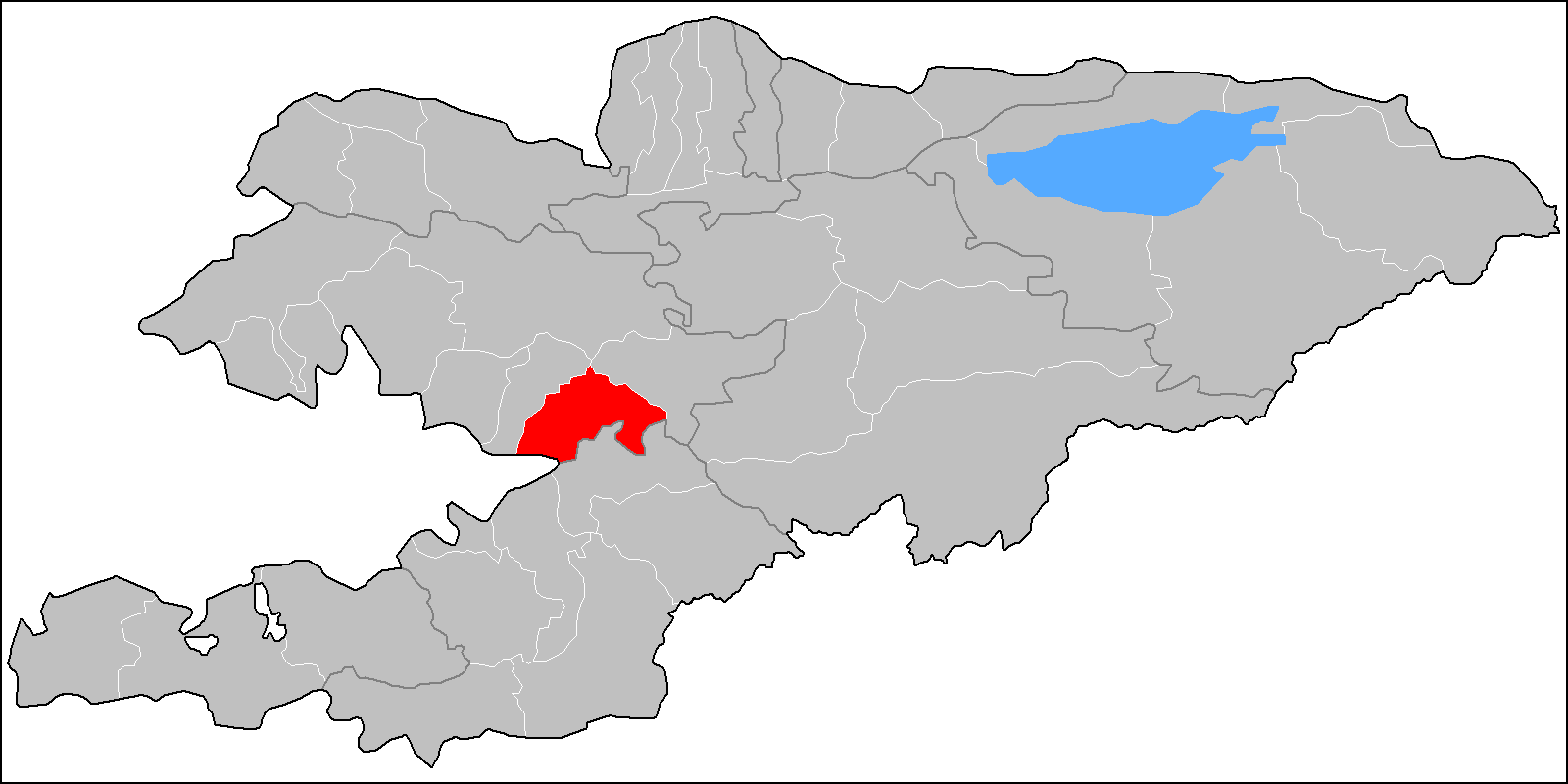
- Country: Kyrgyzstan
- Region: Jalal-Abad Region
- Established: 1928

Area
  - Total: 3,019 km^{2} (1,166 sq mi)

Population (2021)
  - Total: 308,243
  - Density: 102.1/km^{2} (264.4/sq mi)
- Time zone: UTC+6 (Kyrgyzstan Time)

Suzak (Kyrgyz: Сузак району) is a district of Jalal-Abad Region in western Kyrgyzstan. The administrative seat lies at Suzak. Its area is 3,019 square kilometres (1,166 sq mi), and its resident population was 308,243 in 2021.

== Population ==
Historical population
| Year | Pop. | ±% p.a. |
|---|---|---|
| 1970 | 118,310 | — |
| 1979 | 140,848 | +1.96% |
| 1989 | 166,748 | +1.70% |
| 1999 | 200,936 | +1.88% |
| 2009 | 241,198 | +1.84% |
| 2021 | 308,243 | +2.06% |
Note: resident population; Sources:

== Towns, rural communities and villages ==
In total, Suzak District includes 130 settlements in 13 rural communities (ayyl aymagy). Each rural community can consist of one or several villages. The rural communities and settlements in the Suzak District are:

1. Bagysh (seat: Oktyabr'; incl. Bagysh, Besh-Bala, Kedey-Aryk, Kyzyl-Tuu, Sary-Bulak and Safarovka)
2. Barpy (seat: Komsomol; incl. Achy, Boz-Chychkan, Besh-Moynok, Jangy-Ayyl, Jar-Kyshtak, Döböy, Kandy, Ming-Örük, Markay, Prigorodny, Say, Töölös, Tashtak, Türk-Maala, Ülgü, Changget-Say, Cheke-Döbö and Chokmor)
3. Kara-Alma (seat: Kara-Alma; incl. Ortok, Tuura-Janggak and Urumbash)
4. Kara-Daryya (seat: Aral; incl. Tösh and Changgyr-Tash)
5. Kök-Art (seat: Mikhaylovka; incl. Komsomol, Podgornoye and Üch-Malay)
6. Kurmanbek (seat: Taran-Bazar; incl. Joon-Kunggöy, Kalmak-Kyrchyn, Kanjyga, Kara-Cholok, Sary-Bulak, Saty and Urumbash)
7. Kyz-Köl (seat: Karamart; incl. Ak-Bulak, Ak-Took, Jangy-Aryk, Jylan-Temir, Kadu, Kara-Bulak, Katyrangky, Kashka-Terek, Kyz-Köl, Kyzyl-Kyya and Sary-Bulak)
8. Kyzyl-Tuu (seat: Boston; incl. Ak-Bulak, Ak-Terek, Akchaluu, Almaluu-Bulak, Kara-Ingen, Kara-Köl, Kyzyl-Sengir, Orto-Aziya, Soku-Tash, Ak-Bash, Shatrak, Jangy-Achy, Kashka-Suu, Jashasyn-2, Alchaluu, Kyzyl-Alma, Talaa-Bulak, Tashtak and Munduz)
9. Lenin (seat: Lenin; incl. Orto-Say and Jygach-Korgon)
10. Saypidin Atabekov (seat: Bek-Abad; incl. Balta-Kazy, Bököy, Boston, Jangy-Jer, Jiyde, Kaynar, Kara-Jygach, Kashkar-Maala, Kyzyl-Bagysh, Kyrgyz-Abad, Munduz, Nayman, Tash-Bulak, Türk-Abad, Özbek-Abad, Chek and Shirin)
11. Suzak (seat: Suzak; incl. Aral, Blagoveshchenka, Jangy-Dyykan, Dostuk, Kamysh-Bashy, Kyr-Jol and Sadda)
12. Tash-Bulak (seat: Tash-Bulak; incl. Aral, Gülstan, Dimitrovka, Doskana, Eshme, Jangy-Aral, Irrigator, Teplitsa, Cholok-Terek and Yntymak)
13. Yrys (seat: Kümüsh-Aziz; incl. Aral-Say, Jar-Kyshtak, Dömör, Kaynar, Kurgak-Köl, Kyr-Jol, Ladan-Kara, Masadan, Sasyk-Bulak, Totuya, Chymchyk-Jar and Yrys)
Settlements of the Suzak District.
Abbreviations: B - Boston, D - Dimitrovka, Dö - Döböy, C - Changget-Say, CD - Cheke-Döbö, Ch - Chokmor, JK - Jar-Kyshtak, J - Jangy-Ayyl, I - Irrigator, K - Komsomol, KA - Kyrgyz-Abad, KB - Kyzyl-Bagysh, M - Munduz, Ma - Masadan, MÖ - Ming-Örük, Ö - Özbek-Abad, P - Prigorodny, T - Totuya, TA - Türk-Abad, Ü - Ülgü, Y - Yntymak.
