= Manas (city) =

City in western Kyrgyzstan

Manas Манас
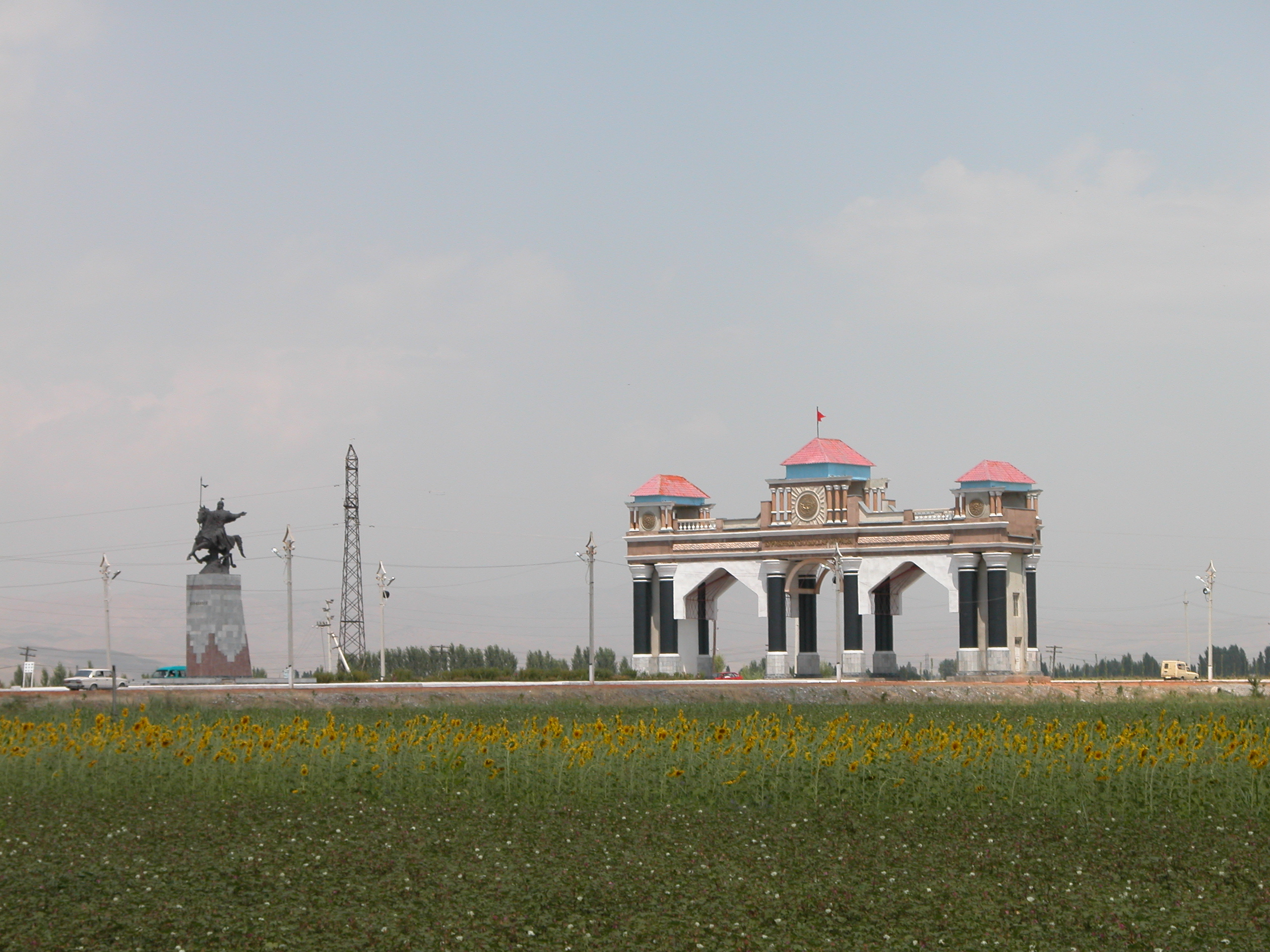
- Entrance to Manas

- Flag Seal
- Anthem: Anthem of Jalal-abad
- Location in Kyrgyzstan
- Coordinates: 40°56′N 73°0′E
- Country: Kyrgyzstan
- Region: Jalal-Abad

Government
  - Mayor: Ularbek Ismailov

Area
  - Total: 88 km^{2} (34 sq mi)
- Elevation: 766 m (2,513 ft)

Population (2021)
  - Total: 123,239
  - Density: 1,400/km^{2} (3,600/sq mi)
- Time zone: UTC+6
- Website: Official website

Manas (/məˈnɑːs/; Kyrgyz: [mɑnɑ́s]), called Jalal-Abad until 2025, is the administrative and economic centre of Jalal-Abad Region in southwestern Kyrgyzstan. Its area is 88 square kilometres (34 sq mi), and its resident population was 123,239 in 2021. It is situated at the north-eastern end of the Fergana Valley along the Kögart river valley, in the foothills of the Babash Ata mountains, near the border with Uzbekistan.

== Overview ==
Manas is known for its mineral springs in its surroundings, and the water from the nearby Azreti-Ayup-Paygambar spa was long believed to cure lepers. Several Soviet era sanatoriums offer mineral water treatment programs for people with various chronic diseases. Bottled mineral water from the region is sold around the country and abroad.

== History ==
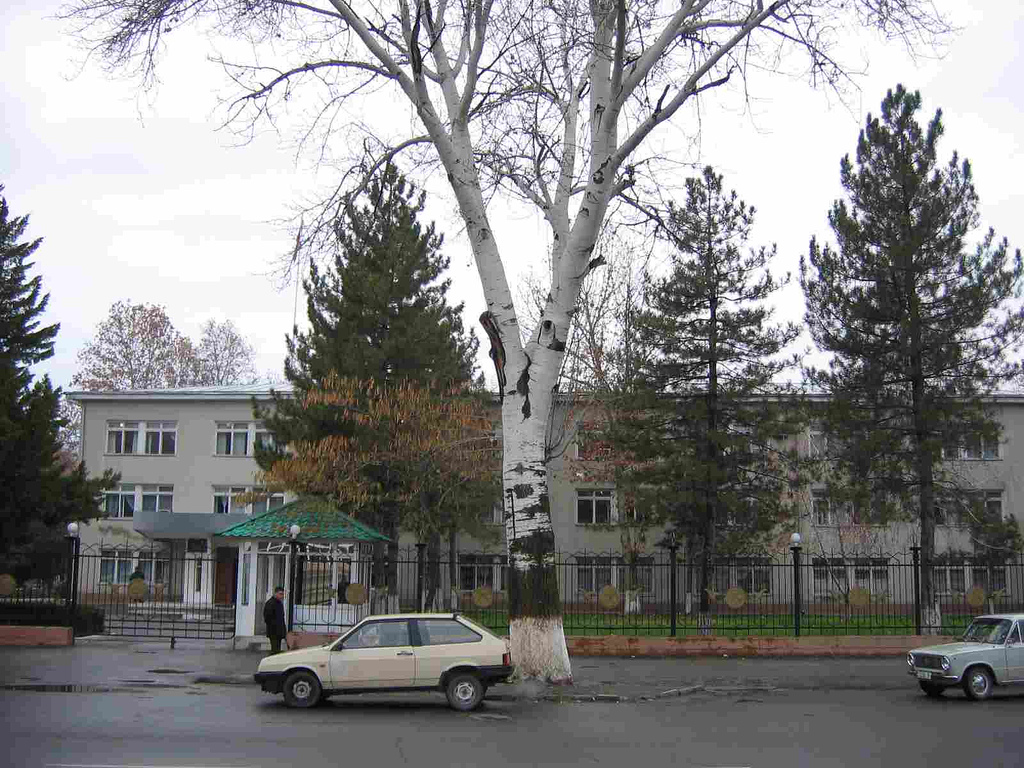
Jalal-Abad street scene

The Parliament of Kyrgyzstan approved a bill to officially rename the city of Jalal-Abad to Manas. The law was signed by the President on September 18, 2025, and will come into effect ten days after its official publication. The change is aimed at strengthening national ideology and honoring the national hero, Manas. One of Kyrgyzstan's main branches of the Silk Road passed through Jalalabat and the region has played host to travelers for thousands of years, although few archaeological remains are visible today – except in some of the more remote parts of the region – such as Saymaluu-Tash and the Chatkal valley. These have included travelers, traders, tourists and pilgrims (to the various holy sights) and sick people visiting the curative spas such as in the Ayub Tau mountain, at the altitude of 700 m above sea level some three kilometers out of town.

There is a legend that the water from the Azreti-Ayup-Paygambar (the Prophet Job) spa cured lepers. According to the legend there was a grave, a mosque and the khan's palace near the spa.

The Persian suffix -abad is often used in city names in Persianate societies to refer to the person who founded the community. It is said that Jalalabat was named after Jalal ad Din, who was renowned for setting up Caravanserais to serve travelers and many pilgrims who came to the holy mountain.

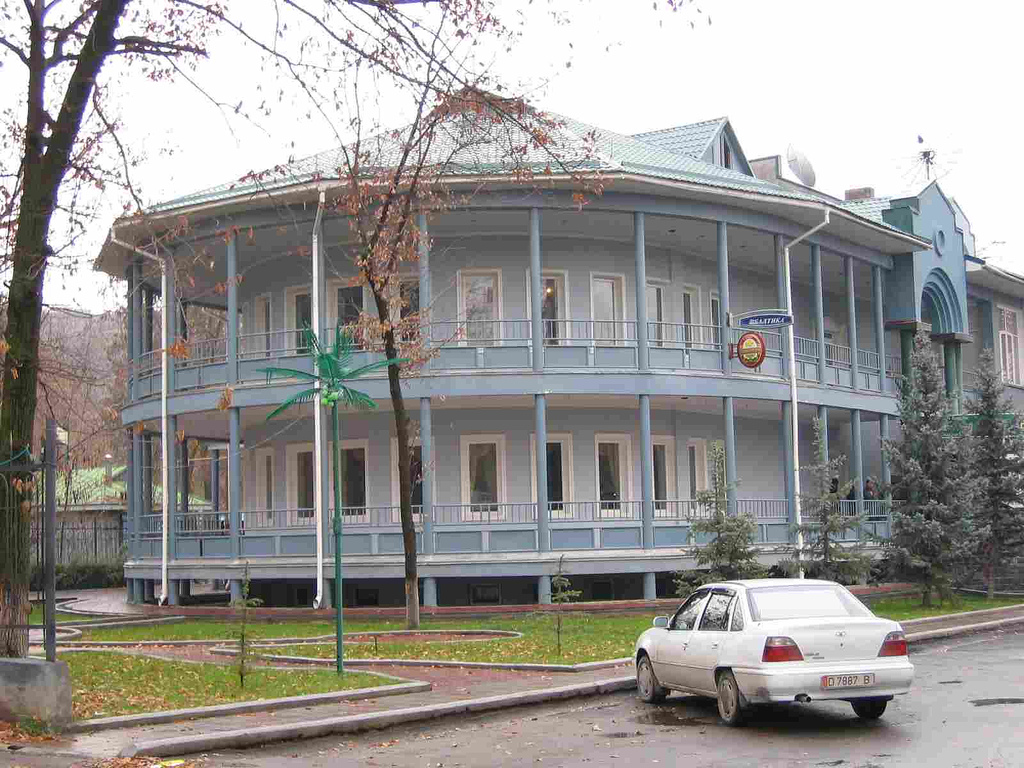
Hotel in Jalal-Abad

In early 19th century a small Kokand fortress was built, and a small kishlak grew up around this. The local people were engaged in agriculture and trade and provided services to the pilgrims visiting the spas. Then, in the 1870s, Russian settlers came to the region. They set up a garrison town and military hospital.

In June 2026, Mayor Abdupaty Matkalikov was dismissed by President Sadyr Japarov after less than four months in office, with no official reason given.

== Population ==
Historical population
Year	Pop.	±% p.a.
1970	46,692	—
1979	58,568	+2.55%
1989	76,284	+2.68%
1999	77,411	+0.15%
2009	97,172	+2.30%
2021	123,239	+2.00%
Note: resident population; Sources:

== Climate ==
Manas has a hot, dry-summer continental climate (Dsa) according to the Köppen climate classification. There is more rainfall in winter than in summer. The average annual temperature in Jalal-Abad is 12.3 °C (54.1 °F). About 416 mm (16.38 in) of precipitation falls annually.

Climate data for Manas (1991–2020, extremes 1957–present)
Month	Jan	Feb	Mar	Apr	May	Jun	Jul	Aug	Sep	Oct	Nov	Dec	Year
Record high °C (°F)	18.8 (65.8)	25.8 (78.4)	30.8 (87.4)	33.9 (93.0)	39.2 (102.6)	41.5 (106.7)	41.8 (107.2)	41.5 (106.7)	40.0 (104.0)	34.2 (93.6)	30.7 (87.3)	20.7 (69.3)	41.8 (107.2)
Mean daily maximum °C (°F)	3.9 (39.0)	6.9 (44.4)	14.5 (58.1)	21.3 (70.3)	26.4 (79.5)	31.5 (88.7)	34.0 (93.2)	32.8 (91.0)	28.6 (83.5)	21.2 (70.2)	12.8 (55.0)	5.8 (42.4)	20.0 (68.0)
Daily mean °C (°F)	−1.1 (30.0)	1.7 (35.1)	8.7 (47.7)	15.1 (59.2)	19.8 (67.6)	24.4 (75.9)	26.8 (80.2)	25.6 (78.1)	21.1 (70.0)	14.0 (57.2)	6.9 (44.4)	0.8 (33.4)	13.7 (56.7)
Mean daily minimum °C (°F)	−4.9 (23.2)	−2.3 (27.9)	4.2 (39.6)	9.6 (49.3)	13.6 (56.5)	17.6 (63.7)	20.1 (68.2)	19.0 (66.2)	14.8 (58.6)	8.7 (47.7)	2.8 (37.0)	−2.7 (27.1)	8.4 (47.1)
Record low °C (°F)	−27.2 (−17.0)	−26.0 (−14.8)	−12.0 (10.4)	−7.8 (18.0)	0.4 (32.7)	5.7 (42.3)	11.1 (52.0)	6.6 (43.9)	0.4 (32.7)	−13.1 (8.4)	−20.0 (−4.0)	−23.6 (−10.5)	−27.2 (−17.0)
Average precipitation mm (inches)	39 (1.5)	51 (2.0)	53 (2.1)	60 (2.4)	47 (1.9)	25 (1.0)	9 (0.4)	6 (0.2)	8 (0.3)	35 (1.4)	51 (2.0)	51 (2.0)	440 (17.3)
Source: Pogoda.ru.net

== Economy ==
The train line (a rarity in Kyrgyzstan), runs from the Ferghana Valley northeast about 30 km to Kökjanggak.

Biggest Companies: Kyrgyz-Canada JV "Kyrgyz Petroleum Company", АО «Kelechek», АО «Nur». AOZT «KyrgyzChlopok», JV «Ak-Altyn» process cotton. There are the tobacco-curing companies «Tura-Ai» Ltd and «Aziz-Tabak» Ltd., that export 90% of their output to 17 countries. There are also mill houses АО «Azrat Ayib», AOZT PTK «Intershaq», «Mariam & Co» ltd, and the liquor manufacturer AOZT «Jalalabat Arak Zavodu».

== Tourism ==
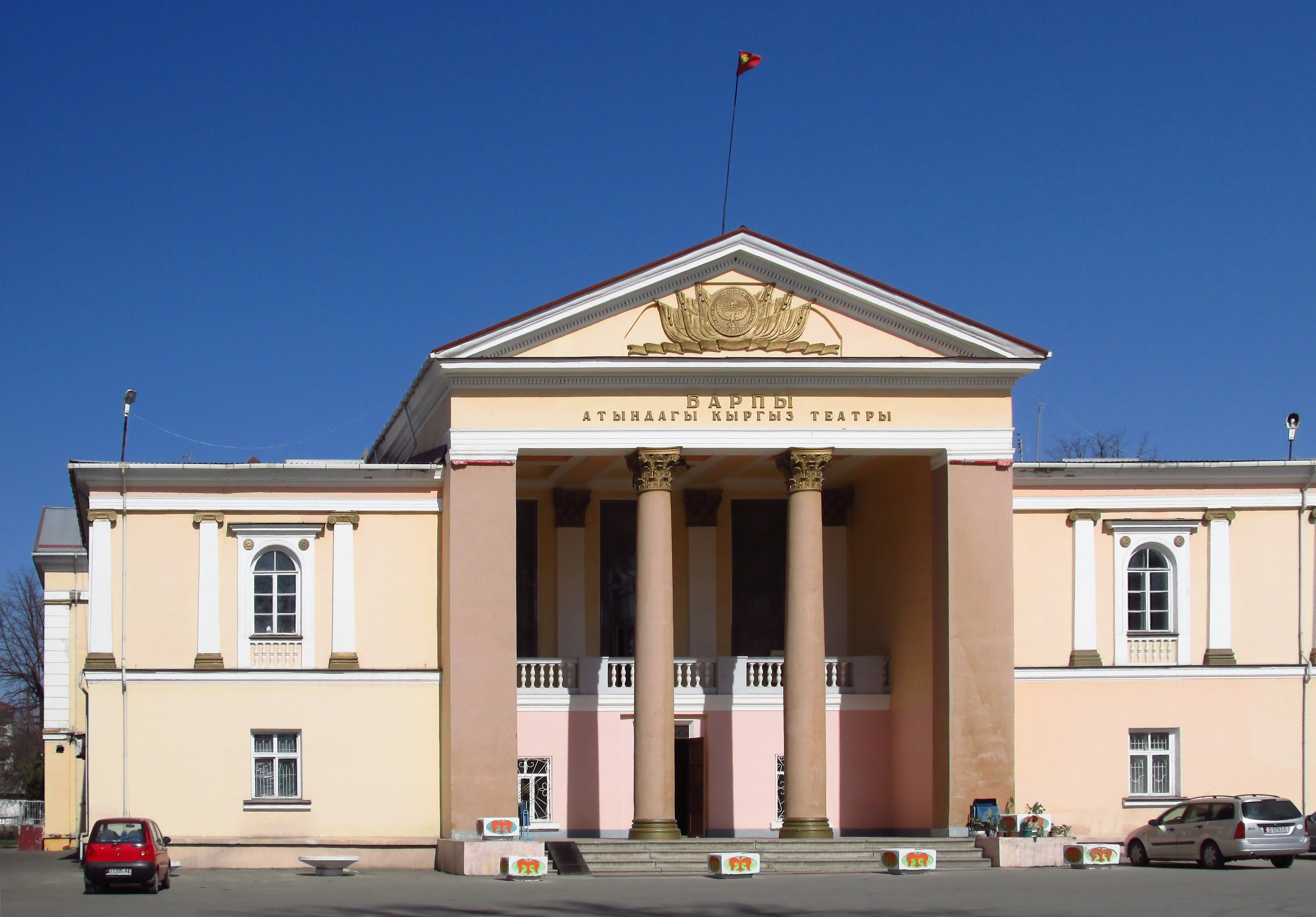
Jalalabad's Theater

The Jalal-Abad Region is known for its walnuts and scenery. Local sites include the Arslanbob Waterfalls and Sary-Chelek Nature Reserve and Lake. In the city itself, sites include the town square and the culture park, which contains various sculptures and Jalalabad's theater.
