= Kögart =

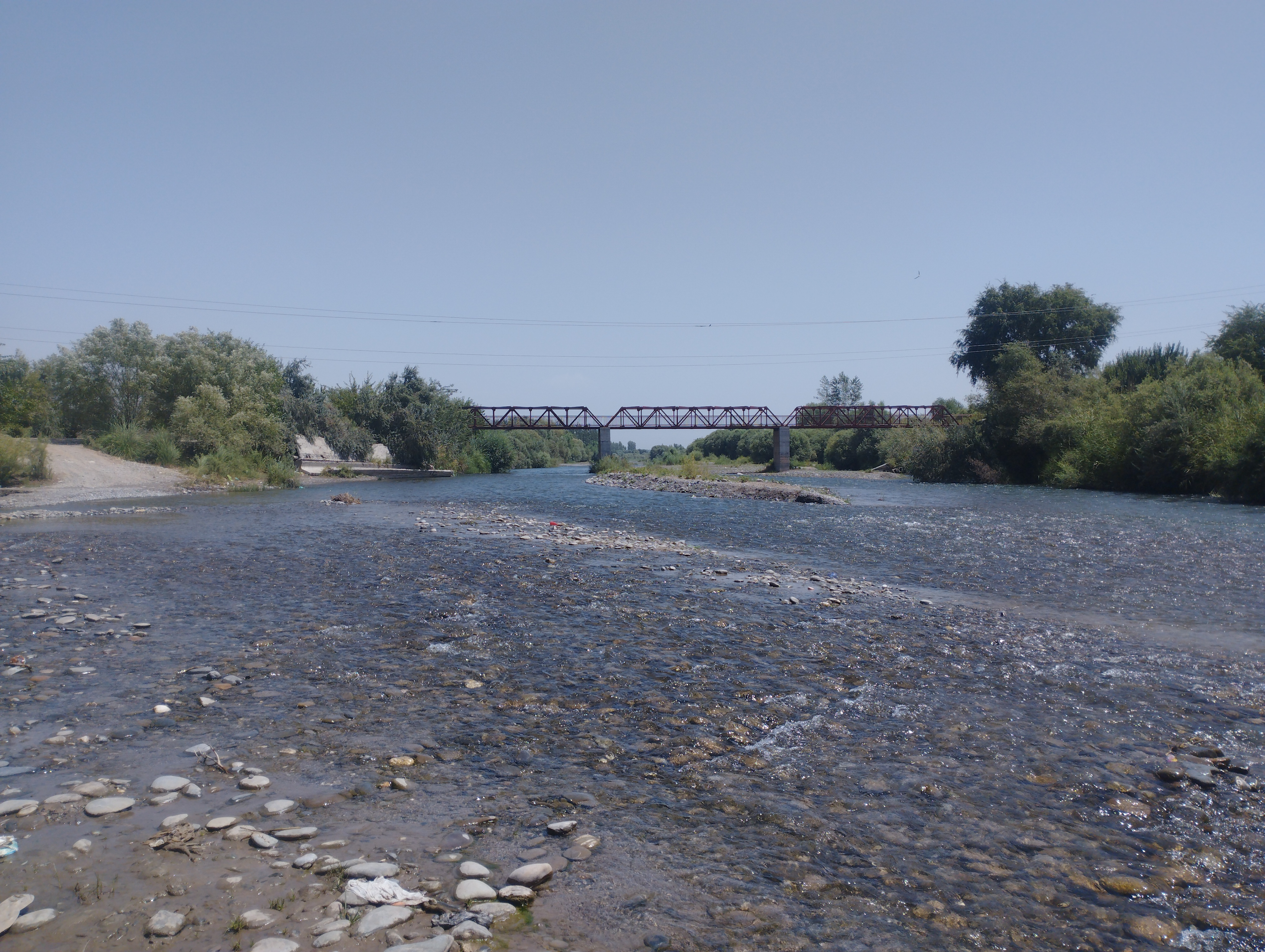
- Etymology: from kök 'blue' and art '[mountain] pass'
- Native name: Көгарт (Kyrgyz); Кёгарт (Russian); Кәҗяртә (Dungan)

Location
- Country: Kyrgyzstan

Physical characteristics
- Mouth
  - location: Kara Darya
  - coordinates: 40°51′29″N 72°49′32″E
- Length: 105 km (65 mi)
- Basin size: 1,370 km^{2} (530 sq mi)
- Discharge
  - average: 18.1 m^{3}/s (640 cu ft/s)

Basin features
- Progression: Kara Darya→ Syr Darya→ North Aral Sea

The Kögart (English: /ˈkoʊˌɡɑːrt/, Kyrgyz: [kɵʁɑ́ɾt]) is a right tributary of the Kara Darya in Kyrgyzstan. It originates on the southwestern slopes of the Fergana Range and flows through the Kögart Valley. The river is 105 km (65 mi) long, with a drainage basin of 1,370 km^{2} (530 sq mi). It flows into the Kara Darya near the town of Suzak. The river is used for irrigation.

== Hydrology ==
Average annual discharge is 18.3 m^{3}/s (650 cu ft/s), with seasonal variation from a minimum of 5.43 m^{3}/s (192 cu ft/s) in January to a maximum of 58.8 m^{3}/s (2,080 cu ft/s) in May. The river is fed by snowmelt, springs, and rainfall, with water levels typically rising in April and receding by August.

== Tributaries ==
Among major tributaries are Kyzyl-Suu, Karamart, Ürümbash, Josho, Karalma, and others.

== Settlements ==
Settlements along the river include Munduz, Joon-Küngöy, Suzak, and others.
