= Districts of Kyrgyzstan =

The regions of Kyrgyzstan are divided into districts (raions), administered by government-appointed officials. Rural communities (ayyl aymagy) consisting of up to twenty small settlements have their own elected mayors and councils. The raions are listed below, by region:

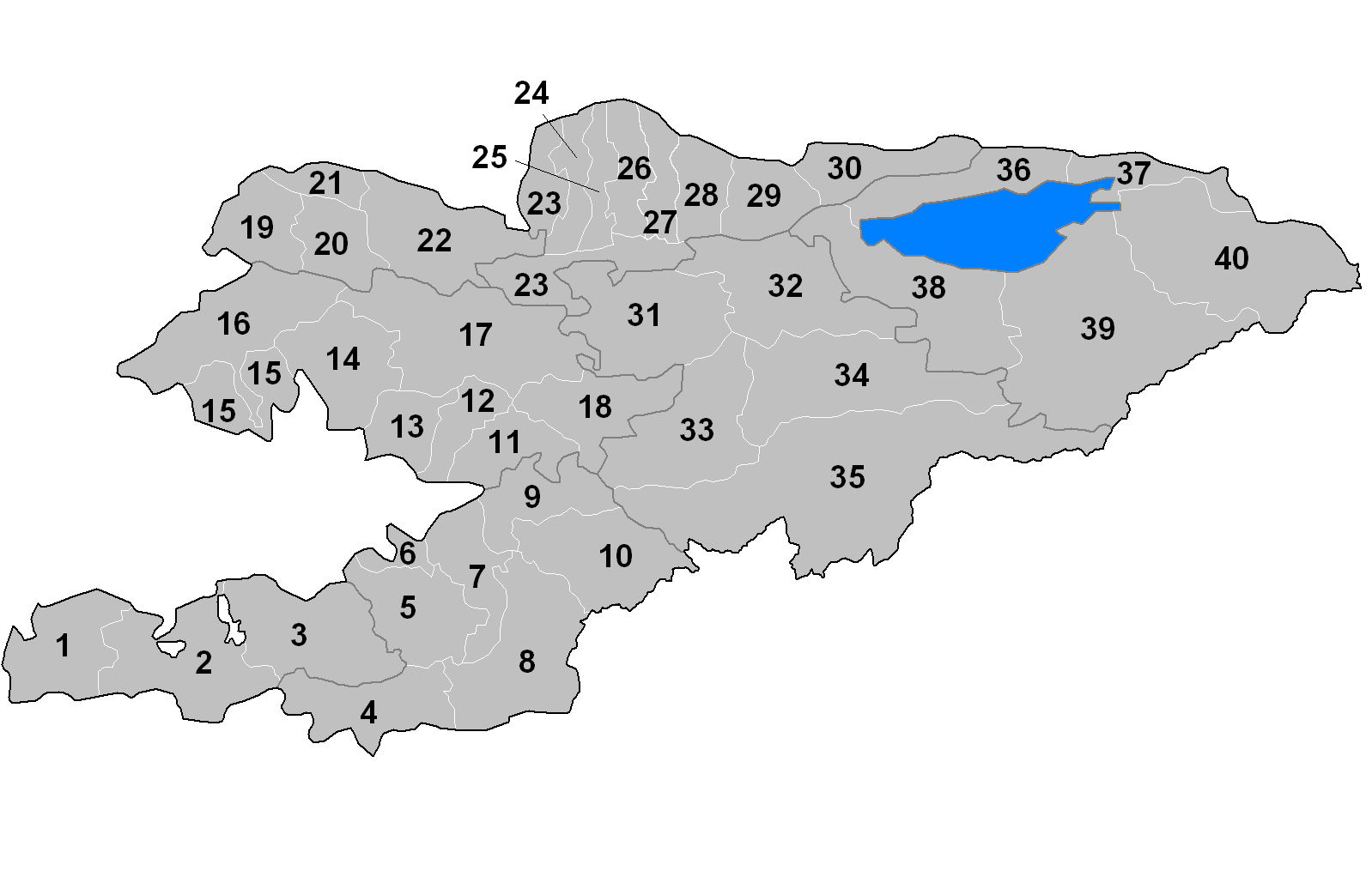
Rural raions of Kyrgyzstan

== North Kyrgyzstan ==
=== Bishkek City ===
The capital city of Bishkek has the status of region and is divided into four districts:

District	Kyrgyz name	Population (2009)
Birinchi May	Биринчи май	171,467
Lenin	Ленин	198,019
Oktyabr	Октябрь	238,329
Sverdlov	Свердлов	214,100

=== Chüy Region ===
Chüy Region is divided administratively into 8 districts:

District	Kyrgyz name	Capital	Population (2009)	Area (km^{2})	Density (/km^{2})	Rural communities	Towns	Urban-type settlements	Villages	Number on map
Alamüdün	Аламүдүн	Lebedinovka	147,208	1,503	98	17	*	*	50	27
Chüy	Чүй	Tokmok	44,753	1,756	25.5	10	*	*	38	29
Jayyl	Жайыл	Kara-Balta	90,348	3,435	26.3	12	1	*	36	24
Kemin	Кемин	Kemin	41,924	3,533	11.9	11	2	1	34	30
Moskva	Москва	Belovodskoye	83,641	2,056	40.7	12	*	*	28	25
Panfilov	Панфилов	Kayyngdy	39,837	2,606	15.3	6	1	*	20	23
Sokuluk	Сокулук	Sokuluk	158,137	2,550	62	19	1	*	68	26
Ysyk-Ata	Ысык-Ата	Kant	131,503	2,415	54.5	18	1	*	56	28

=== Issyk-Kul Region ===
Issyk-Kul Region is divided administratively into 5 districts:

District	Kyrgyz name	Capital	Population (2009)	Area (km^{2})	Density (/km^{2})	Rural communities	Towns	Urban-type settlements	Villages	Number on map
Ak-Suu	Ак-Суу	Teploklyuchenka	62,524	9,917	6.3	14	*	*	39	40
Issyk-Kul	Ысык-Көл	Cholpon-Ata	74,973	3,603	20.8	12	1	*	30	36
Jeti-Ögüz	Жети-Өгүз	Kyzyl-Suu	79,328	14,499	5.5	13	*	*	47	39
Tong	Тоң	Bökönbaev	48,870	7,230	6.8	9	*	*	30	38
Tüp	Түп	Tüp	56,416	2,121	26.6	13	*	*	37	37

=== Naryn Region ===
Naryn Region is divided administratively into 5 districts:

District	Kyrgyz name	Capital	Population (2009)	Area (km^{2})	Density (/km^{2})	Rural communities	Towns	Urban-type settlements	Villages	Number on map
Ak-Talaa	Ак-талаа	Baetov	30,643	7,266	4.2	13	*	*	19	33
At-Bashy	Ат-Башы	At-Bashy	49,238	15,354	3.2	11	*	*	18	35
Jumgal	Жумгал	Chaek	40,718	4,803	8.5	13	*	*	28	31
Kochkor	Кочкор	Kochkor	58,267	5,868	9.9	11	*	*	32	32
Naryn	Нарын	Naryn	44,080	10,502	4.2	15	1	*	39	34

=== Talas Region ===
Talas Region is divided administratively into 4 districts:

District	Kyrgyz name	Capital	Population (2009)	Area (km^{2})	Density (/km^{2})	Rural communities	Towns	Urban-type settlements	Villages	Number on map
Bakay-Ata	Бакай-Ата	Bakay-Ata	44,057	2,928	15	9	*	*	19	20
Kara-Buura	Кара-Буура	Kyzyl-Adyr	58,056	4,216	14	10	*	*	23	19
Manas	Манас	Semety	32,913	1,198	27	5	*	*	22	21
Talas	Талас	Manas	58,867	5,051	12	13	*	*	27	22

== South Kyrgyzstan ==
=== Batken Region ===
Batken Region is divided administratively into 3 districts:

District	Kyrgyz name	Capital	Population (2009)	Area (km^{2})	Density (/km^{2})	Rural communities	Towns	Urban-type settlements	Villages	Number on map
Batken	Баткен	Batken	69,591	5,948	11.7	*	*	*	42	2
Kadamjay	Кадамжай	Kadamjay	157,597	6,146	25.6	*	*	4	103	3
Leylek	Лейлек	Isfana	116,861	4,653	25.1	*	1	*	46	1

=== Jalal-Abad Region ===
Jalal-Abad Region is divided administratively into 8 districts:

District	Kyrgyz name	Capital	Population (2009)	Area (km^{2})	Density (/km^{2})	Rural communities	Towns	Urban-type settlements	Villages	Number on map
Aksy	Аксы	Kerben	106,049	4,578	23.2	*	1	*	68	14
Ala-Buka	Ала-Бука	Ala-Buka	81,488	2,976	27.4	*	*	*	41	15
Bazar-Korgon	Базар-Коргон	Bazar-Korgon	132,051	1,965	67.2	*	*	*	57	12
Chatkal	Чаткал	Kanysh-Kyya	21,154	4,608	4.6	*	*	2	9	16
Nooken	Ноокен	Masy	109,687	2,336	47	*	1	*	54	13
Suzak	Сузак	Suzak	220,675	3,019	73.1	*	1	*	123	11
Toguz-Toro	Тогуз-Торо	Kazarman	21,417	3,816	5.6	*	*	*	13	18
Toktogul	Токтогул	Toktogul	83,479	7,815	10.7	*	*	1	44	17

=== Osh Region ===
Osh Region is divided administratively into 7 districts:

District	Kyrgyz name	Capital	Population (2009)	Area (km^{2})	Density (/km^{2})	Rural communities	Towns	Urban-type settlements	Villages	Number on map
Alay	Алай	Gülchö	72,170	6,821	11	14	*	*	62	8
Aravan	Араван	Aravan	106,134	1,340	79	8	*	*	48	6
Chong-Alay	Чоң Алай	Daroot-Korgon	25,039	4,857	5.2	3	*	*	22	4
Kara-Kulja	Кара-Кулжа	Kara-Kulja	87,691	5,813	15	12	*	*	49	10
Kara-Suu	Кара-Суу	Kara-Suu	348,645	3,616	96	16	1	*	122	7
Nookat	Ноокат	Nookat	236,455	3,179	74	16	1	*	75	5
Özgön	Өзгөн	Özgön	228,114	3,308	69	19	1	*	99	9

== See also ==
- Regions of Kyrgyzstan
