= Regions of Kyrgyzstan =

Regions and Cities of Kyrgyzstan Регионы и независимые города Кыргызстана (Russian)
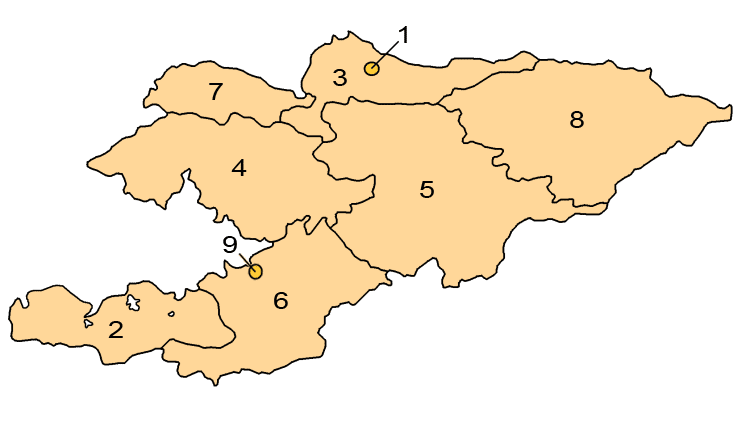
- A clickable map of Kyrgyzstan exhibiting its provinces.
- Category: Unitary state
- Location: Kyrgyz Republic
- Number: 7 regions 2 independent cities
- Populations: (Regions): 247,200 (Talas) – 1,228,400 (Osh) (Cities): 270,300 (Osh) - 937,400 (Bishkek)
- Areas: (Regions): 11,000 km^{2} (4,400 sq mi) (Talas) - 45,000 km^{2} (17,500 sq mi) (Naryn) (Cities): 170.000 km^{2} (65.6374 sq mi) (Bishkek) - 160.000 km^{2} (61.7763 sq mi) (Osh) - 182.000 km^{2} (70.2706 sq mi)
- Government: Region government, National government
- Subdivisions: District

Kyrgyzstan is divided into seven regions (Kyrgyz: облус, romanized: oblus; Russian: область, romanized: oblast). The capital, Bishkek, is administered as an independent city of republican significance, as well as being the capital of Chüy Region. Osh also has independent city status since 2003.

== Regions ==
The regions, with their areas, census populations and capitals, are as follows:

No.	Name	Capital	Kyrgyz	Russian	ISO	Area (km^{2})	Population (2022 census)
1	Bishkek City (Note: Bishkek serves as the capital of the Chüy Region, as an independent city, and as the national capital.)		Бишкек шаары Bishkek shaary	Город Бишкек; Gorod Bishkek	KG-GB	160	1,098,448
2	Batken Region	Batken	Баткен облусу Batken oblusu	Баткенская область Batkenskaya oblast′	KG-B	17,048	558,652
3	Chüy Region	Bishkek	Чүй облусу Chüy oblusu	Чуйская область Chuyskaya oblast′	KG-C	19,895	985,430
4	Jalal-Abad Region	Manas	Жалал-Абад облусу Jalal-Abad oblusu	Джалал-Абадская область Dzhalal-Abadskaya oblast′	KG-J	32,418	1,282,253
5	Naryn Region	Naryn	Нарын облусу Naryn oblusu	Нарынская область Narynskaya oblast′	KG-N	44,160	294,311
6	Osh Region	Osh (Note: Osh serves as both the capital of the Osh Region and as an independent city.)	Ош облусу Osh oblusu	Ошская область Oshskaya oblast′	KG-O	28,934	1,414,670
7	Talas Region	Talas	Талас облусу Talas oblusu	Таласская область Talasskaya oblast′	KG-T	13,406	274,029
8	Issyk-Kul Region	Karakol	Ысык-Көл облусу Ysyk-Köl oblusu	Иссык-Кульская область Issyk-Kulskaya oblast′	KG-Y	43,735	505,901
9	Osh City		Ош шаары Osh shaary	Город Ош; Gorod Osh	KG-GO	182	333,629

Each region is further divided into districts (rayon), administered by government-appointed officials. Rural communities (ayyl aymagy) consisting of up to twenty small settlements have their own elected mayors and councils.

== See also ==
- ISO 3166-2:KG
