= Kazakhstan–Kyrgyzstan border =

International border

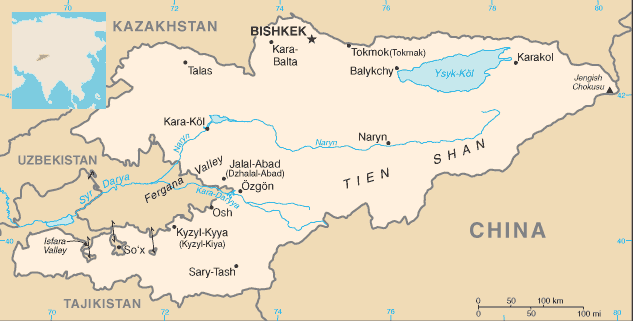
Map of Kyrgyzstan with Kazakhstan to the north

The Kazakhstan–Kyrgyzstan border is 1,212 kilometres (753 mi) and runs from the tripoint with Uzbekistan to the tripoint with China. Bishkek, the Kyrgyz capital, is situated just 16 km (10 mi) to the south of this boundary, and Almaty (Kazakhstan's largest city and former capital) is situated just 29 kilometres (18 mi) to the north of it.

Kazakhstani and Kyrgyzstani boundary markers

== Description ==
The border starts in the west at the tripoint with Uzbekistan in the Ugam Range and then proceeds in a north-eastwards direction, past Taraz and along the Kyrgyz Ala-Too mountains. The border then traces a rough arc around Kara-Balta, before following the Chu river past Bishkek and Tokmok. Leaving the Chu near the town of Kara-Bulak, the border then proceeds eastwards across the Küngöy Ala-Too Range, north of lake Issyk-Kul, to the tripoint with China.

Kazakhstan's Taraz to Aktobe railway crosses through Kyrgyzstan briefly, a legacy of the Soviet era where infrastructure was built without regard to what were then internal boundaries.

== History ==
Russia had conquered Central Asia in the 19th century, by annexing the formerly independent Khanates of Kokand and Khiva and the Emirate of Bukhara. After the Communists took power in 1917 and created the Soviet Union it was decided to divide Central Asia into ethnically based republics in a process known as National Territorial Delimitation (or NTD). This was in line with Communist theory that nationalism was a necessary step on the path towards an eventually communist society, and Joseph Stalin's definition of a nation as being “a historically constituted, stable community of people, formed on the basis of a common language, territory, economic life, and psychological make-up manifested in a common culture”.

The NTD is commonly portrayed as being nothing more than a cynical exercise in divide and rule, a deliberately Machiavellian attempt by Stalin to maintain Soviet hegemony over the region by artificially dividing its inhabitants into separate nations and with borders deliberately drawn so as to leave minorities within each state. The charge is so common as to have become almost the conventional wisdom within mainstream journalistic coverage of Central Asia, with Stalin himself often the one drawing the borders, see for example Stourton, E. in The Guardian, 2010 Kyrgyzstan: Stalin's deadly legacy; Zeihan, P. for Stratfor, 2010 The Kyrgyzstan Crisis and the Russian Dilemma; The Economist, 2010 Kyrgyzstan - Stalin's Harvest; Pillalamarri, A in the Diplomat, 2016, The Tajik Tragedy of Uzbekistan; Rashid, A in the New York Review of Books, 2010, Tajikistan - the Next Jihadi Stronghold?; Schreck, C. in The National, 2010, Stalin at core of Kyrgyzstan carnage, Though indeed the Soviets were concerned at the possible threat of pan-Turkic nationalism, as expressed for example with the Basmachi movement of the 1920s, closer analysis informed by the primary sources paints a much more nuanced picture than is commonly presented.

The Soviets aimed to create ethnically homogeneous republics, however many areas were ethnically mixed (e.g. the Ferghana Valley) and it often proved difficult to assign a ‘correct’ ethnic label to some peoples (e.g. the mixed Tajik-Uzbek Sart, or the various Turkmen/Uzbek tribes along the Amu Darya). Local national elites strongly argued (and in many cases overstated) their case and the Soviets were often forced to adjudicate between them, further hindered by a lack of expert knowledge and the paucity of accurate or up-to-date ethnographic data on the region. Furthermore, NTD also aimed to create ‘viable’ entities, with economic, geographical, agricultural and infrastructural matters also to be taken into account and frequently trumping those of ethnicity. The attempt to balance these contradictory aims within an overall nationalist framework proved exceedingly difficult and often impossible, resulting in the drawing of often tortuously convoluted borders, multiple enclaves and the unavoidable creation of large minorities who ended up living in the ‘wrong’ republic. Additionally the Soviets never intended for these borders to become international frontiers as they are today.

Soviet Central Asia in 1922 before national delimitation

NTD of the area along ethnic lines had been proposed as early as 1920. At this time Central Asia consisted of two Autonomous Soviet Socialist Republics (ASSRs) within the Russian SFSR: the Turkestan ASSR, created in April 1918 and covering large parts of what are now southern Kazakhstan, Uzbekistan and Tajikistan, as well as Turkmenistan), and the Kirghiz Autonomous Soviet Socialist Republic (Kirghiz ASSR, Kirgizistan ASSR on the map), which was created on 26 August 1920 in the territory roughly coinciding with the northern part of today's Kazakhstan (at this time Kazakhs were referred to as ‘Kyrgyz’ and what are now the Kyrgyz were deemed a sub-group of the Kazakhs and referred to as ‘Kara-Kyrgyz’ i.e. mountain-dwelling ‘black-Kyrgyz’). There were also the two separate successor ‘republics’ of the Emirate of Bukhara and the Khanate of Khiva, which were transformed into the Bukhara and Khorezm People's Soviet Republics following the takeover by the Red Army in 1920.

On 25 February 1924 the Politburo and Central Committee of the Soviet Union announced that it would proceed with NTD in Central Asia. The process was to be overseen by a Special Committee of the Central Asian Bureau, with three sub-committees for each of what were deemed to be the main nationalities of the region (Kazakhs, Turkmen and Uzbeks), with work then exceedingly rapidly. There were initial plans to possibly keep the Khorezm and Bukhara PSRs, however it was eventually decided to partition them in April 1924, over the often vocal opposition of their Communist Parties (the Khorezm Communists in particular were reluctant to destroy their PSR and had to be strong-armed into voting for their own dissolution in July of that year).

The creation of the Kazakh-Kyrgyz border was hampered by disputes over whether the Kyrgyz (then called ‘Kara-Kirghiz’) were a separate people from the Kazakhs (then called ‘Kirghiz’), or just Kazakhs who happened to be semi-nomadic dwellers of mountainous regions. It was decided that the Kara-Kirghiz (Kyrgyz) were different enough to warrant the creation of an Autonomous Oblast within the Russia SSR in October 1924, with borders matching those of modern Kyrgyzstan. In 1925 it was renamed the Kirghiz Autonomous Oblast in May 1925, then became the Kirghiz ASSR in 1926 (not to be confused with the Kirghiz ASSR that was the first name of Kazak ASSR), and finally it became the Kirghiz SSR in 1936.

The boundary became an international frontier in 1991 following the dissolution of the Soviet Union and the independence of its constituent republics. The two countries began work on demarcating their common boundary in the 1990s and 2000s in a spirit of cooperation that contrasts starkly with much of the other ex-Soviet Central Asian states. A final border treaty was signed on 15 December 2001, entering into force in 2008, with the border being demarcated on the ground in the following years.

== Border crossings ==
- Aisha Bibi (KAZ) – Chongkapka (KGZ) (road)
- Merke (KAZ) – Kara-Balta (KGZ) (road and rail)
- Korday (KAZ) – Lugovoye/Akjol (KGZ) (road)
- Khun Chi (KAZ) - Kara-Su (KGZ) (road)
- Avtodorozhniy (KAZ) - Kenbulun (KGZ) (road, locals only)
- Kegen (KAZ) – Tüp (KGZ) (road, summer only)
- Almaty (KAZ) – Chong-Sary-Oy (KGZ) (road and hiking via the free Ozerny Pass/Pereval Ozernyy)

== Settlements near the border ==
=== Kazakhstan ===
- Taraz
- Kasyk
- Korday

=== Kyrgyzstan ===
- Kök-Say
- Amanbayevo
- Sheker
- Pokrovka
- Kyzyl-Adyr
- Köpürö-Bazar
- Chaldybar, Chuy
- Kaindy
- Kamyshanovka
- Vasil'yevka
- Birdik
- Ivanovka
- Tokmok
- Kara-Bulak
- Tüp

== History maps ==
Historical English-language maps of the Kazakh SSR–Kyrgyz SSR border, mid to late 20th century:

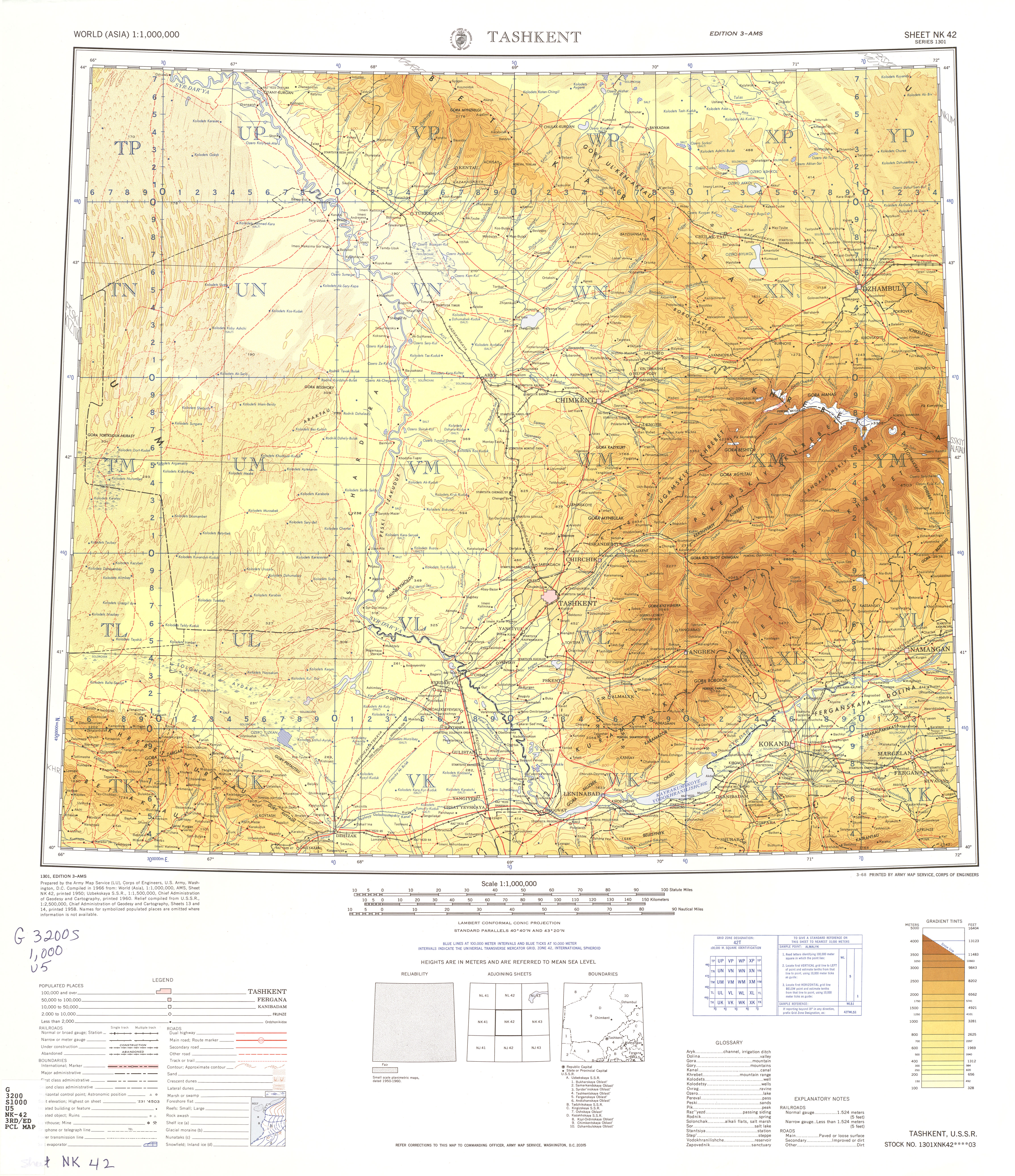

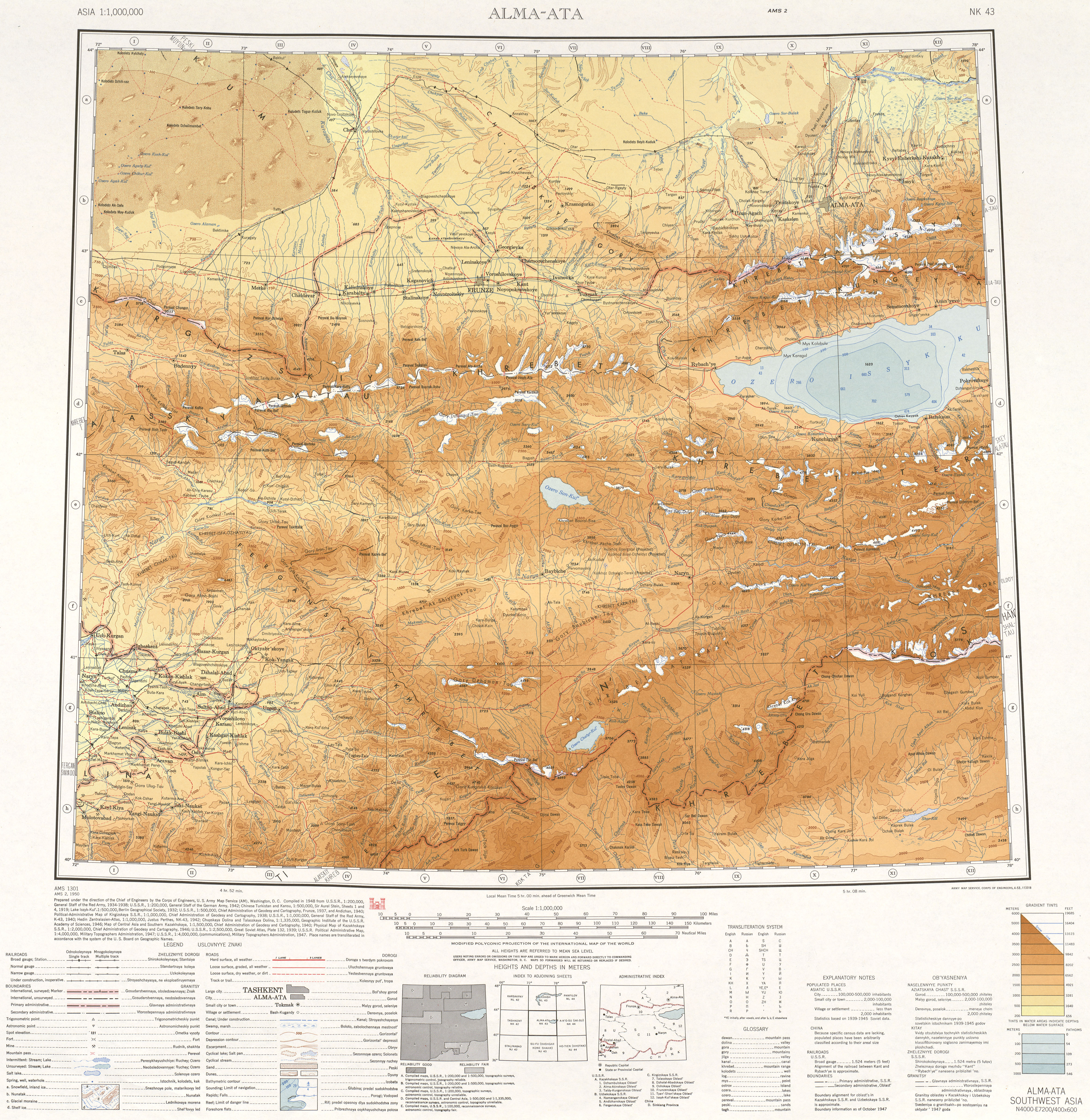

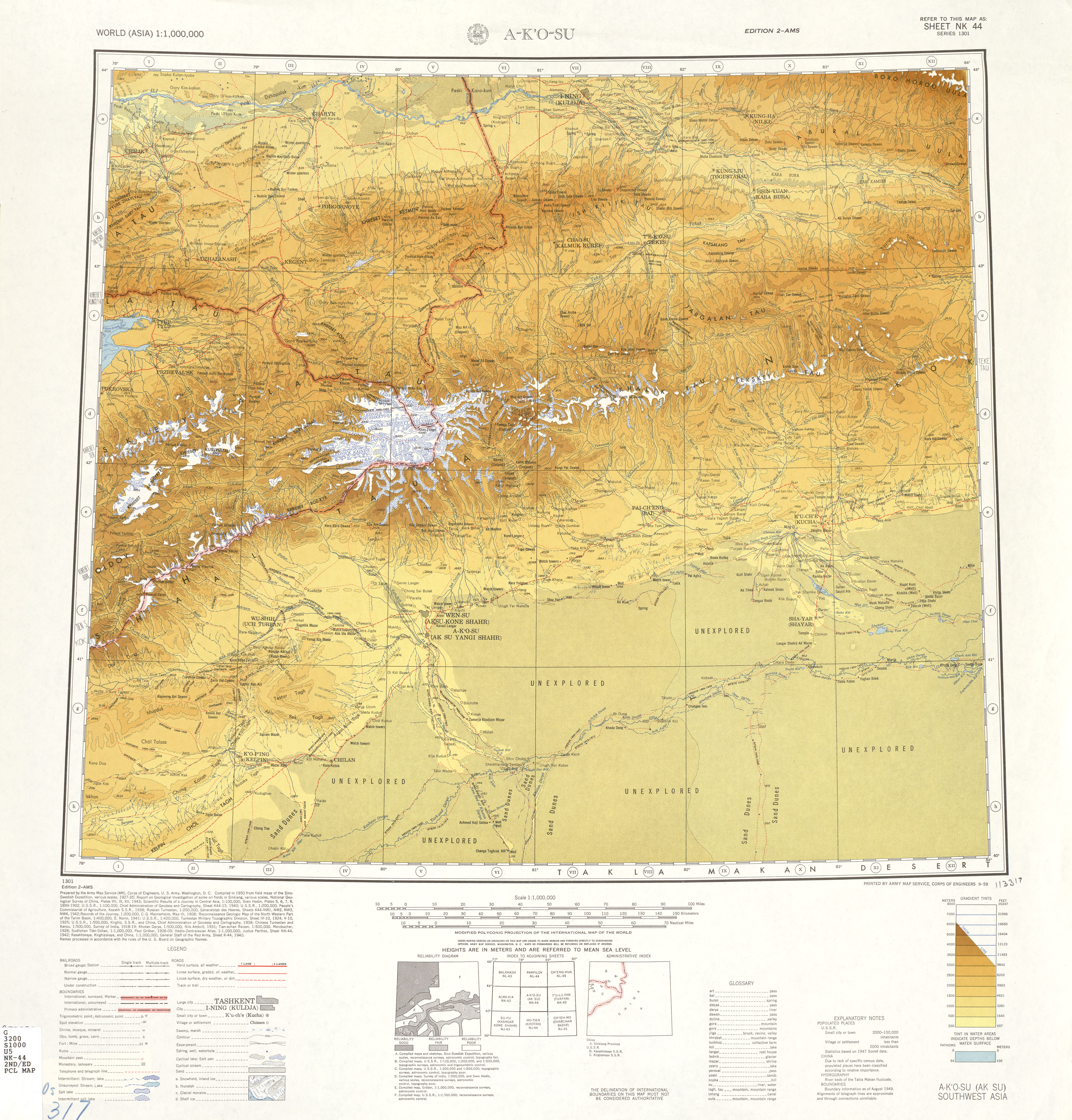

== Border regions ==
Regions of Kazakhstan bordering Kyrgyzstan:

- Almaty Region
- Jambyl Region

Regions of Kyrgyzstan bordering Kazakhstan:

- Chüy Region
- Issyk-Kul Region
- Talas Region

== See also ==
- Kazakhstan–Kyrgyzstan relations
