= Kara-Buura Nature Park =

National park in Kyrgyzstan

- Kyrgyz: Кара-Буура мамлекеттик жаратылыш паркы
- IUCN category II (national park)
- Location within Kyrgyzstan
- Location: Kara-Buura District, Talas Region, Kyrgyzstan
- Nearest city: Talas
- Coordinates: 42°22′N 71°01′E
- Area: 61,544 ha (152,080 acres)
- Established: 2005

Kara-Buura Nature Park (Kyrgyz: Кара-Буура мамлекеттик жаратылыш паркы) is a national park in Kara-Buura District of Talas Region of Kyrgyzstan established in June 2005. The purpose of the park is conservation of the unique mid-mountain savannoids, alpine and sub-alpine meadows, biodiversity of Western Tien-Shan, protection of rare and endangered flora and fauna, and extension of network of specially protected areas of Kyrgyz Republic. The area of the park is 61,544 hectares. The park is situated on the northern slopes of the Talas Alatoo range, on the border with Kazakhstan, 50 km from Kök-Say and 120 km from the regional center Talas.
