= Maymak =

Maymak Маймак
- Location within Kyrgyzstan
- Coordinates: 42°40′50″N 71°12′50″E
- Country: Kyrgyzstan
- Region: Talas
- District: Aitmatov
- Maymak: 1914

Population (2021)
  - Total: 827
- Time zone: UTC+6

Maymak (Kyrgyz: Маймак) is a village in the Aitmatov District, Talas Region, Kyrgyzstan. It is located on the banks of the Asa River, about 45 km (28 mi) northwest of the district administrative center, Kyzyl-Adyr. The settlement was founded in 1914, and a railway station was constructed there in 1920 to serve a section of the Turkestan–Siberia Railway (Turksib). The population of Maymak was 827 in 2021. From 1950 to 2012, it held the status of an urban-type settlement.

== Population ==
Historical population
Year	Pop.	±% p.a.
1970	429	—
1979	423	−0.16%
1989	933	+8.23%
1999	882	−0.56%
2009	887	+0.06%
2021	827	−0.58%
Note: resident population; Sources:

== In memoirs ==
The Maymak railway station is mentioned in the childhood recollections of the writer Chingiz Aitmatov. In 1937, during the period of Great Purge, his father, Torekul Aitmatov, a Kyrgyz statesman, foresaw his imminent arrest after an accusatory article about him appeared in the newspaper Pravda. To save his family, he sent his wife Nagima Aitmatova and their four children from Moscow back to their native village of Sheker.

During the journey, the train briefly stopped at Maymak station late at night. The carriage halted far from the station, and Nagima, guided only by a lantern’s faint light, hurried to take her children off the train. The attendant helped them settle in the waiting hall before the train moved on.

This episode, symbolizing the family’s separation and the beginning of exile, remained deeply imprinted in Aitmatov’s memory and was later described in his autobiographical work Childhood.

According to the recollections of Rozetta Aitmatova, the writer’s sister, when the villagers decided to celebrate Chingiz Aitmatov’s 60th anniversary in 1988, representatives of the Kara-Buura District (now Aitmatov District) arrived to plan the festivities. They first proposed visiting the local school in Amanbaev (previously Groznoe), but Aitmatov insisted:

"No, first we will visit the Maymak station."

The organizers did not understand at first, but followed his wish. They went to Maymak before anything else — to remember that night.
