= Akkol (disambiguation) =

Akkol meaning "White Lake", may refer to

- Akkol, a town in northern Kazakhstan, former Alexeyevka
- Akkol, Zerendi District, a village in the Akmola Region, Kazakhstan
- Akkol, Talas District, a village in the Zhambyl Region, Kazakhstan
- Akkol District, Kazakhstan
- Akkol', Aktobe, a town in western Kazakhstan
- Akkol (lake), a lake in the Kostanay Region, Kazakhstan
- Lake Akkol, a lake in the Zhambyl Region, Kazakhstan
