= Kurkureu-Suu =

River in Kyrgyzstan

The Kurkureu-Suu (Куркуреу су on Soviet-era maps) is a river originating in the Kyrgyz Republic that is in the basin of the Talas river but that does not connect to it. It is a transboundary river, shared administratively between the Kyrgyz Republic and Kazakhstan into which it flows.

A village, Kurkureusu, and a KTZ railway station are near the river.

== Hydrology ==
=== Course ===
The river forms in Kyrgyz mountains on the northern slopes of Talas Ala-Too, running down a gorge and through the Kara-Too ridge, to merge with a tributary of the Ters to form the Asa on the plains of Kazakhstan. The Asa then runs north, turning westwards close to Taraz, to flow into Lake Bilyukol.

=== Classification and measurements ===
It is a Tien Shan type of river, with its high water phase in March–September and low-water phase in October–February. It is fed by ice-snow run-off from the mountains, and was catalogued by the Soviet Union in the 1970s as having a 3% glaciation area, i.e. 13.6 square kilometres (5.3 sq mi).

Its annual discharge rate has risen since the 1970s soviet measurements, which were 6.19 cubic metres per second (219 cu ft/s) in the 1927–1972 period and are more recently 7.11 cubic metres per second (251 cu ft/s) in the 2001–2017 period.

== Administration ==
The original agreement covering the administration of the river was the Soviet-era Regulation on Water Sharing Between the Kazakh SSR and Kirgiz SSR for the Talas, Kurkureu-Su, and Aspara Rivers, enacted in 1942. It controlled the share of the river between what were then Soviet republics.

The Smart Waters project, supported by the United States Agency for International Development (USAID), included plans for the river starting in 2017. The object was to improve water allocation. With decreasing areas of cultivation on the Khazak side and a lack of maintenance of irrigation channels on that side, and a lack of water on the Kyrgyz side, the project aimed to provide more water to that side and to update the 70-year old Soviet-era guidelines.

== In popular culture ==
The river, the surrounding area, and Sheker were settings for the early works of Kyrgyz author Chinghiz Aitmatov.
