= Aqkol =

Aqkol is the name of several places in Kazakhstan:

- Aqkol, Almaty
- Aqkol, Aktobe
- Aqkol, Atyrau
