= Besh-Tash Nature Park =

Nature park in Talas Region, Kyrgyzstan

- IUCN category II (national park)
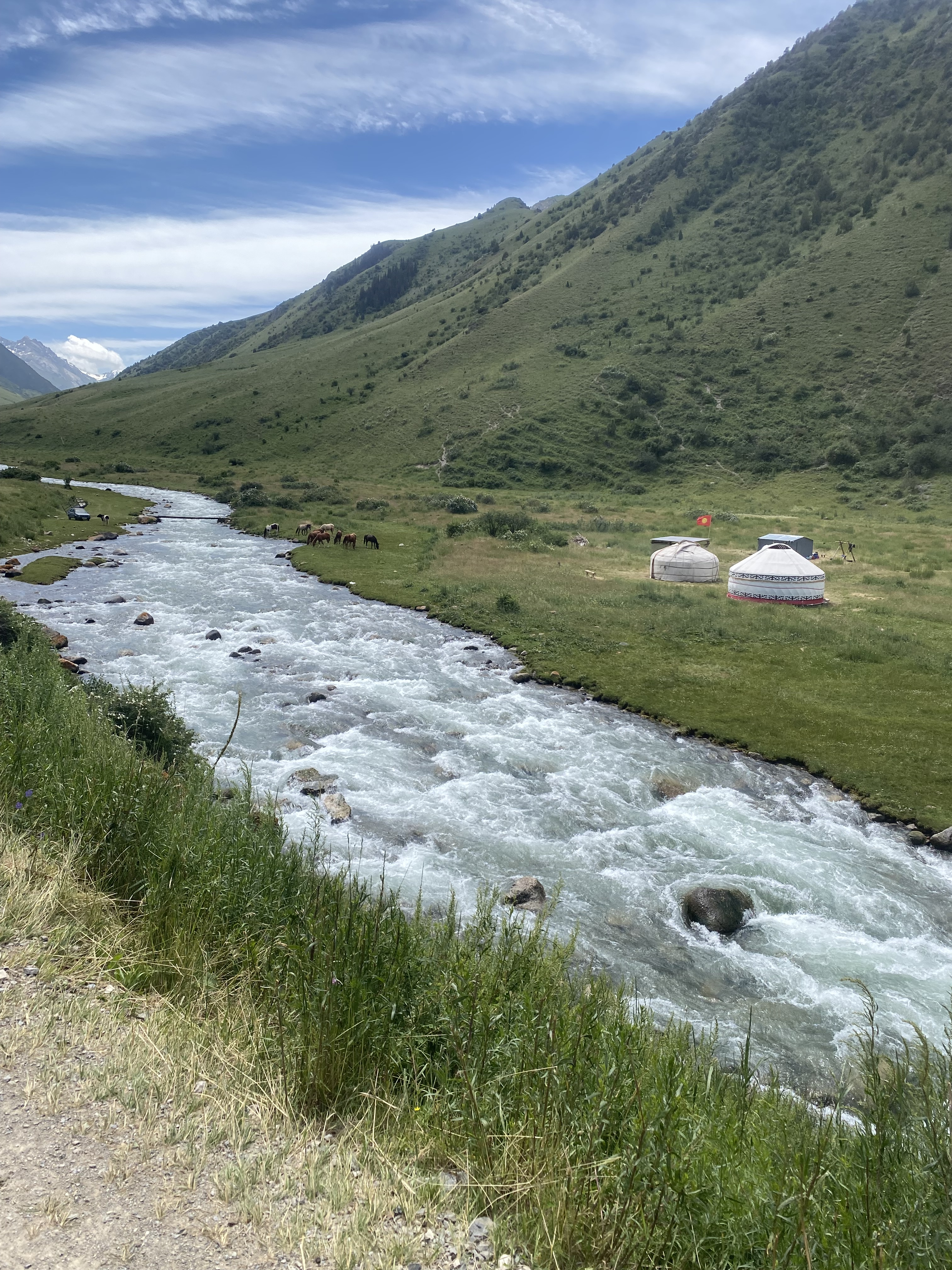

- Location within Kyrgyzstan
- Location: Talas Region, Kyrgyzstan
- Nearest city: Talas
- Coordinates: 42°17′N 72°18′E
- Area: 13,731.5 ha (33,931 acres)
- Established: 1996

Besh-Tash Nature Park (Kyrgyz: Беш-Таш мамлекеттик жаратылыш паркы, Russian: Государственный природный парк Беш-Таш) is a nature park in Talas Region, Kyrgyzstan. It is located 13 km from the city of Talas. It was established in 1996. It currently covers 13,731.5 hectares, including 5,895 hectares of strictly protected area and 334.5 hectares for regulated recreational use.

Besh-Tash Nature Park is located in the Talas Valley, on the northern slopes of the central part of the Talas Alatoo mountain range. The river Besh-Tash flows through the park.

At the end of the valley is the pearl of this park, a large turquoise lake. Very rare snow leopards live in this area.
