= Ashchykol, Jambyl Region =

Lake in Kazakhstan

Ashchykol
- Ащыкөл
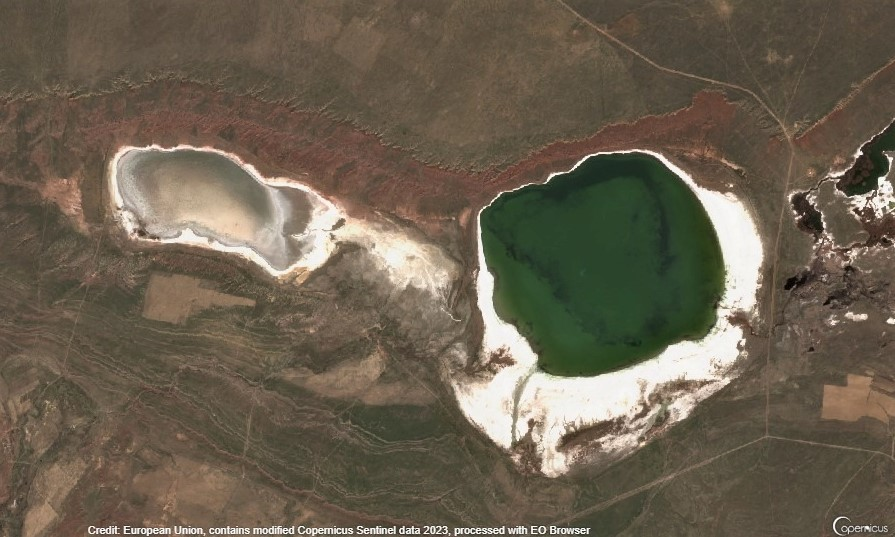
- Sentinel-2 image of lakes Tuzkol (left) and Ashchykol (right) in March 2019

- Location within Kazakhstan
- Location: Sarysu and Talas districts
- Coordinates: 43°30′N 70°36′E
- Type: Endorheic lake
- Primary inflows: Koktal
- Primary outflows: Asa tributary
- Basin countries: Kazakhstan
- Max. length: 10 kilometers (6.2 mi)
- Max. width: 8 kilometers (5.0 mi)
- Surface area: 67 square kilometers (26 sq mi)
- Max. depth: 5 meters (16 ft)
- Settlements: Akkol

Ashchykol (Kazakh: Ащыкөл) is a salt lake in the Sarysu and Talas districts, Jambyl Region, Kazakhstan.

Ashchykol is located 12 kilometers (7.5 mi) to the northwest of Akkol village.

== Geography ==
Ashchykol is located north of the Karatau Range, in the lower Talas river basin. Lake Tuzkol lies very close to the west, and Akkol 7 kilometers (4.3 mi) to the southeast. The Koktal flows into the lake from the southwest and a branch of it connects it with Tuzkol to the west. A tributary of the Asa river flows out of the lake from the eastern shore.

The northern edge of the lake is steep, its banks reaching a height between 6 meters (20 ft) and 8 meters (26 ft). On the other hand, the eastern lakeshore is flat and sandy, while the southern is clayey. The water freezes at the end of December and melts at the end of March. Depending from the rainfall the lake dries completely in the summer, becoming a vast salt flat.

== Flora and fauna ==
Reeds grow on some of the lakeshore stretches. There are seasons in which geese, ducks and waders stop over in the lake.

== See also ==
- List of lakes of Kazakhstan
