= Kaynar =

Kaynar Кайнар
- Location within Kyrgyzstan
- Coordinates: 42°32′20″N 71°5′0″E
- Country: Kyrgyzstan
- Region: Talas
- District: Kara-Buura

Population (2021)
  - Total: 1,570
- Time zone: UTC+6

Kaynar is a village in Talas Region of Kyrgyzstan. It is part of the Kara-Buura District. Its population was 1,570 in 2021.
