= Talas District =

Talas District may refer to:

- Talas District, Kazakhstan
- Talas District, Kyrgyzstan
