= Birdik =

Birdik may refer to the following places in Kyrgyzstan:

- Birdik, Alamüdün, a village in Alamüdün District, Chuy Region
- Birdik, Ysyk-Ata, a village in Ysyk-Ata District, Chuy Region
- Birdik, Nooken, a village in Nooken District, Jalal-Abad Region
- Birdik, Toguz-Toro, a village in Toguz-Toro District, Jalal-Abad Region
- Birdik, Naryn, a village in At-Bashy District, Naryn Region
