= Kazakhstan–Kyrgyzstan relations =

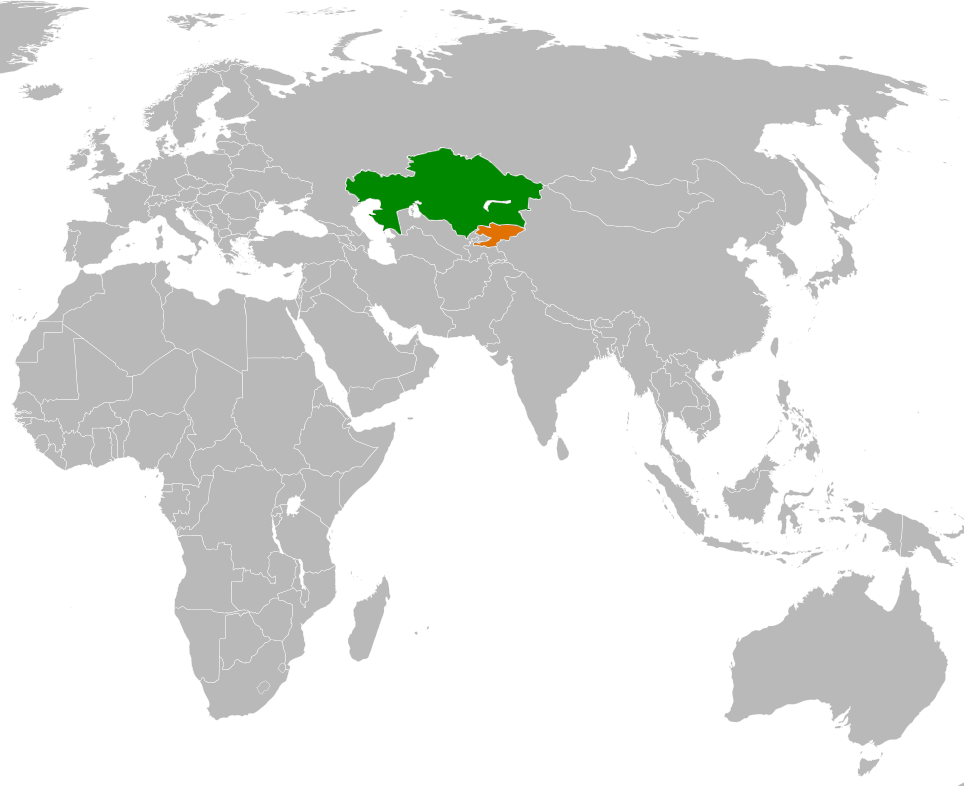

- Kazakhstan: Kyrgyzstan

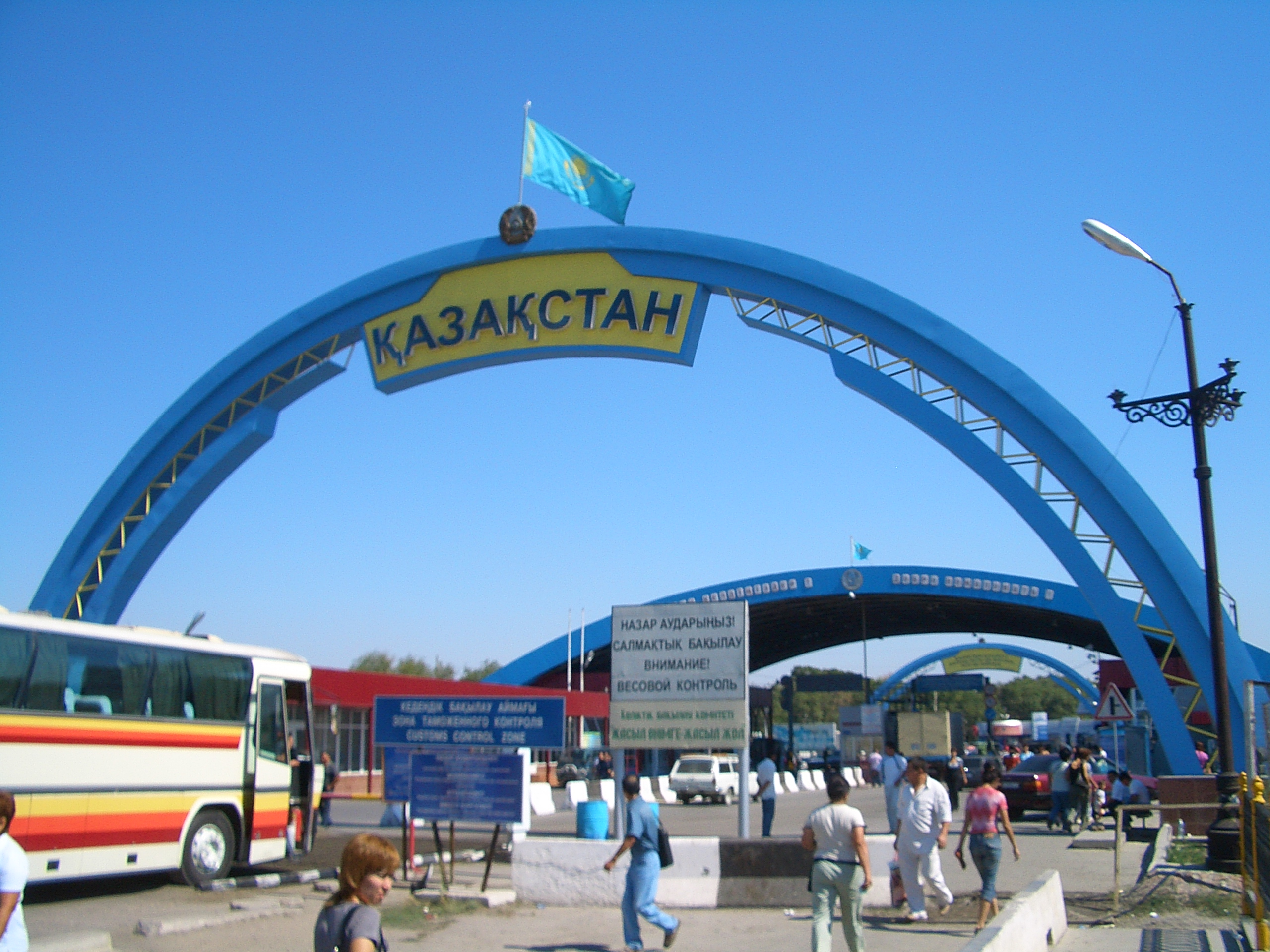
At the busy Korday border crossing between the two countries

Kazakhstan–Kyrgyzstan relations refers to the bilateral diplomatic relations between the Republic of Kazakhstan and the Kyrgyz Republic. Bilateral relationships between the countries, which share a border, are very strong and Kyrgyz and Kazakh are very close in terms of language, culture and religion. Kyrgyz-Kazakh relationships have always been at very high level and economic and other formal connections of two countries have been greeted with strong appreciation by both nations since the two share a lot in common. Both countries are full members of the Commonwealth of Independent States, Eurasian Economic Union, Collective Security Treaty Organization, Shanghai Cooperation Organisation, Organization of Turkic States, Organisation of Islamic Cooperation and the United Nations.

== Background ==
=== Ancient and medieval eras ===
Both Kazakhs and Kyrgyz are parts of the wider Kipchak people, which were the Turkic people that opted to not moving away from nomadic life after the fall of the Western Turkic Khaganate. They were also previously parts of Kimek–Kipchak confederation and Cumania, both were loosely organised Kipchak states that spanned from Eastern Europe to western China and Mongolia. Following the Mongol conquest of Cumania, the Mongol Empire reorganised the fallen Cuman state into a more organised tribal form called Jochid Ulus, during which the Kipchak identity became permanently codified as the Kipchaks underwent massive Mongolization of their culture and genetics enough that, despite reversed Turkification of language and adoption of Islam, they never shed away their nomadic heritages due to this Mongol Borjigin links.

The Kazakh Khanate, a direct descendant of the Chinggisid lineage, was the first post-Kipchak state of both Kazakhs and Kyrgyz. However, the Khanate became weakened after repeated invasions and wars against the Dzungar Khanate, and parts of modern-day Kazakhstan and Kyrgyzstan were put under Dzungar control until 1755. However, following the liquidation of the Dzungar Khanate by Qing China, both the Kazakhs and Kyrgyz found themselves facing a new, hostile Chinese enemies in the east, resulted in the Sino–Kazakh Wars that ultimately decimated the Kazakh Khanate's strength and power that, even though it survived the Chinese conquest, much of the land recovered were again lost to China and divided between China and the Karlukified Uzbek-led Kokand Khanate, and both Kazakhs and Kyrgyz were subjected to a large-scale genocide by the Chinese force as they were seen no different than the Dzungars. In both cases, the Manchu-Chinese, the Altishahr Chagatayan and Uzbek Kokandi rule on Kazakh and Kyrgyz population were especially harsh and brutal, causing many bitter resentment against both occupiers and would ultimately fuel the Russian Empire to invade Central Asia later on.

=== Tsarist era ===
As Russia turned attention to Central Asia, having battled the Kenesary's Rebellion of Kenesary Kasymov, the Russians turned their attentions. The fact that Qing China and Kokand Khanate were in the weak feet due to external situations, fuelled the Kazakh and Kyrgyz rebellions and foundation of the Kara-Kyrgyz Khanate against both Chinese and Uzbek rules, enabled the Russians to invade Central Asia. To ensure divisions, Russian force, similar to the Chinese and Uzbeks, employed divide-and-rule, promising Kyrgyz protection that would ultimately enable the Kyrgyz nomads to reveal Kenesary's hiding place, resulted in Kenesary's killing. Without any rallying figure, Kazakh and Kyrgyz people were placed under Russian domination fully in 1860.

During the World War I, the Tsarist Empire struggled badly in the frontline, and to compensate, the Tsarist regime announced full military conscription of Central Asians into the Imperial Russian Army, causing the widespread rebellion; thousands of Kyrgyz and Kazakh nomads fled to war-torn Xinjiang of the Chinese Republic, and many of them perished. The rebellion would last until the Soviet conquest in 1922.

=== Soviet era ===
Flag of the Kazakhstan SSR.

Flag of the Kyrgyz SSR.

After the establishment of the communist rule in Moscow, Kazakhstan and Kyrgyzstan were made republics of the Soviet Union. They began their existence as autonomous republics within the Russian Soviet Federative Socialist Republic before 1936 when it was split into Soviet republics of Kazakhstan and Kirghizia. During this very time, a deeply traumatic event occurred in both entities, the Kazakh famine of 1930–1933 that saw more than 40% and a smaller (but still large) portion of Kyrgyz population perished.

During Joseph Stalin's rule, between 1930 and 1944, there were a number of ethnic groups such as the Kurds, Germans, Kalmyks, Chechens, Ingush, Meskhetian Turks, Crimean Tatars, Poles or Balkars that were sent to Kazakhstan or Kirghzia due to Stalinist brutal and genocidal policies, while nomadic Kazakhs and Kyrgyz were then deported from Kazakhstan, being forced to fight for the Red Army. This disastrous demographic engineering had more impacts among Kazakhs, as they became the only titular nation that was made minority of their own land; though Kirghizia also suffered to some extent with the widespread presence of non-Kyrgyz minorities like Dungans, Uzbeks, Tajiks, Uyghurs, Russians, Germans, Poles, Belarusians, Romanians, Pashtuns, and Ukrainians at the same time.

While the cultures and traditions were maintained, the nationalism rose during the late 1980s under Mikhail Gorbachev's policies of glasnost and perestroika.

In March 1991, Kazakhstan and Kirghizia participated in a referendum in an attempt to preserve the Union as a renewed federation of sovereign states. During the failed coup that happened in Moscow in August 1991, Askar Akayev and Nursultan Nazarbayev condemned the communist hardliners.

Shortly after the events of the aborted coup, Kirghizia (renamed to Kyrgyzstan) and Kazakhstan declared their independence on August 31 and December 16 respectively before the final dissolution of the Soviet Union on December 26, 1991 when it ceased to exist. Relations between the two countries began in 1992.

== Modern era ==
Negotiations on the delimitation of the state border between Kazakhstan and Kyrgyzstan were conducted from November 1999 and concluded on 15 December 2001 with the signing in Astana of the Intergovernmental Treaty on the Kazakhstan–Kyrgyzstan State Border, which entered into force on 5 August 2008. Work on the installation of border markers along the Kazakh–Kyrgyz state border has been completed. On 25 December 2017, the President of Kazakhstan, Nursultan Nazarbayev, and the President of Kyrgyzstan, Sooronbay Jeenbekov, signed the Treaty on the Demarcation of the Kazakh–Kyrgyz State Border.

On April 26, 2007, the presidents of Kazakhstan and Kyrgyzstan signed an agreement to create an "International Supreme Council" between the two states. This historic event took place during an official visit of the Kazakh president to the Kyrgyzstan capital, Bishkek. Kazakhstan is extremely important to northern Kyrgyzstan. For some period in the mid-1990s, the virtual closure of Manas Airport at Bishkek made Kazakhstan's capital, Almaty, the principal point of entry to Kyrgyzstan. Kyrgyzstan's northwestern city of Talas receives nearly all of its services through the city of Taraz, across the border in Kazakhstan.

=== Kyrgyz election of 2017 ===
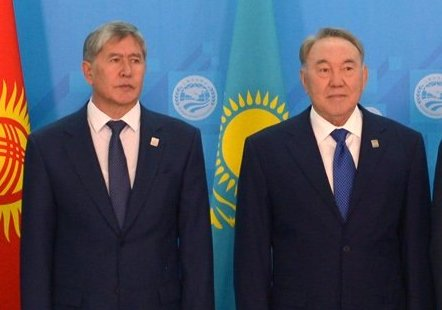
Almazbek Atambayev with Nursultan Nazarbayev.

During the 2017 Kyrgyz presidential election, on October 7, 2017, president Almazbek Atambayev accused Kazakhstan of sponsoring and backing one of the presidential candidates. He also accused Kazakhstan officials for being corrupt by looting the pensioners income. Upon his disapproval, on October 9, Atambayev's office also announced that he was cancelling his attendance at an upcoming CIS heads of state summit in the Russian city of Sochi. An event that would have required the Kyrgyz leader to meet president of Kazakhstan, Nursultan Nazarbayev. Due to the outlash, Kazakhstan border officials imposed a high-security regime at 6 pm on October 10, massively slowing down the passage of travelers and dispatched several truckloads of troops to the border and erected checkpoints. The troops are reportedly set to remain there until after Kyrgyzstan's elections are over. The Kyrgyz border service then replied with its own high-security regime two hours later.

In response to the allegations from Atambayev, the Kazakh Central Election Commission (OSK) declined an invitation to monitor the elections.

=== Relations under Sooronbay Jeenbekov ===
Relations under President Sooronbay Jeenbekov in the military sphere reached a new level, with Kazakh Defense Minister Saken Zhasuzakov becoming the first Kazakh military leader to visit Bishkek in July 2018.

== Economic relations ==
Kazakhstan's direct investment in the Kyrgyz economy has been rapidly gaining pace since the early 2000s. Today Kazakhstan's economic presence is felt throughout northern Kyrgyzstan, from banks to small businesses, cars with Kazakh plates and numerous tourists. For the most, the Kyrgyz are welcoming these trends as both countries share a similar culture and traditions. During the last five years Kazakhstan invested about 400 million dollars in Kyrgyzstan and is considered the largest investor. Thirty-three percent of the total Kyrgyzstan bank's equity belongs to Kazakh investors. There are about 2,000 enterprises functioning in Kyrgyzstan, and 500 belong to Kazakh entrepreneurs. Kazakh-Kyrgyz unification is in the economic interests of both countries. "I do not see any problem in unification with another country. In the future we should unite with this or another state, anyway. Unification with Kazakhstan will be a good accelerator for our economic development," said lawmaker Juraev.

In 2007, the President of Kazakhstan Nursultan Nazarbayev suggested the creation of a fund to facilitate Kyrgyzstan's economic development. However, the sides started implementing this project only in 2011. KKIF was created with a capital of US$100 million, fully funded by Kazakhstan. Its main objective is to render financial assistance to Kyrgyzstan's economy through implementation of the priority projects on its territory and effective development of small and medium businesses in Kyrgyzstan.

In 2014, Deputy Secretary General of the Turkic-speaking states Cooperation Council (Turk-ssCC) Adakhan Madumarov spoke about the Great Silk Way project that would bring tourism to both Kyrgyzstan and Kazakhstan.

In 2021, it was reported that the trade turnover between Kazakhstan and Kyrgyzstan reached US$680 million - a growth of 9% over the first nine months of 2021.
