= Kara-Buura Pass =

Mountain pass in Kyrgyzstan

- Kyrgyz: Кара-Буура ашуусу
- Location within Kyrgyzstan
- Elevation: 3,305 metres (10,843 ft)
- Traversed by: National road M-109

Third Approach
- Location: Kyrgyzstan
- Range: Talas Ala-Too
- Coordinates: 42°12′11″N 71°34′48″E

Kara-Buura Pass (Kyrgyz: Кара-Буура ашуусу) is a pass in Talas Province of Kyrgyzstan. It is located at Talas Alatau at the elevation of 3,305 m (10,843 ft) on the route connecting Talas and Chatkal valleys. The pass is located at the headwaters of Kara-Buura (left tributary of Talas River) and Karakysmak (right tributary of Chatkal river). The road to Kara-Buura Pass typically opens in June and closes in September–October. The road of national significance М-109 (as per the national road classification) connecting Shamaldy-Say, Kerben, Ala-Buka, Kanysh-Kyya, and Kyzyl-Adyr crosses the pass.
