= Chymgent =

Chymgent Чымгент
- Location within Kyrgyzstan
- Coordinates: 42°37′20″N 71°31′10″E
- Country: Kyrgyzstan
- Region: Talas
- District: Kara-Buura

Population (2021)
  - Total: 7,243
- Time zone: UTC+6

Chymgent (Kyrgyz: Чымгент) is a village in Talas Region of Kyrgyzstan. It is part of the Kara-Buura District. Its population was 7,243 in 2021.

== Population ==
Historical population
Year	Pop.	±% p.a.
2009	4,990	—
2021	7,243	+3.15%
Note: resident population; Sources:
