= FC Namys-APK Talas =

Kyrgyz football club

Namys-APK Talas
- Full name: Football Club Namys-APK Talas
- Ground: Zhashtyk Stadion; Talas, Kyrgyzstan
- Capacity: 10,000
- League: Kyrgyzstan League
- 1992: 9th

FC Namys-APK Talas was a Kyrgyzstani football club based in Talas, that played in the top domestic division, the Kyrgyzstan League. The club played its home games at Zhashtyk Stadion.

== See also ==
- Football in Kyrgyzstan
- List of football clubs in Kyrgyzstan
- FC Talas
