= Bilikol =

- Билікөл
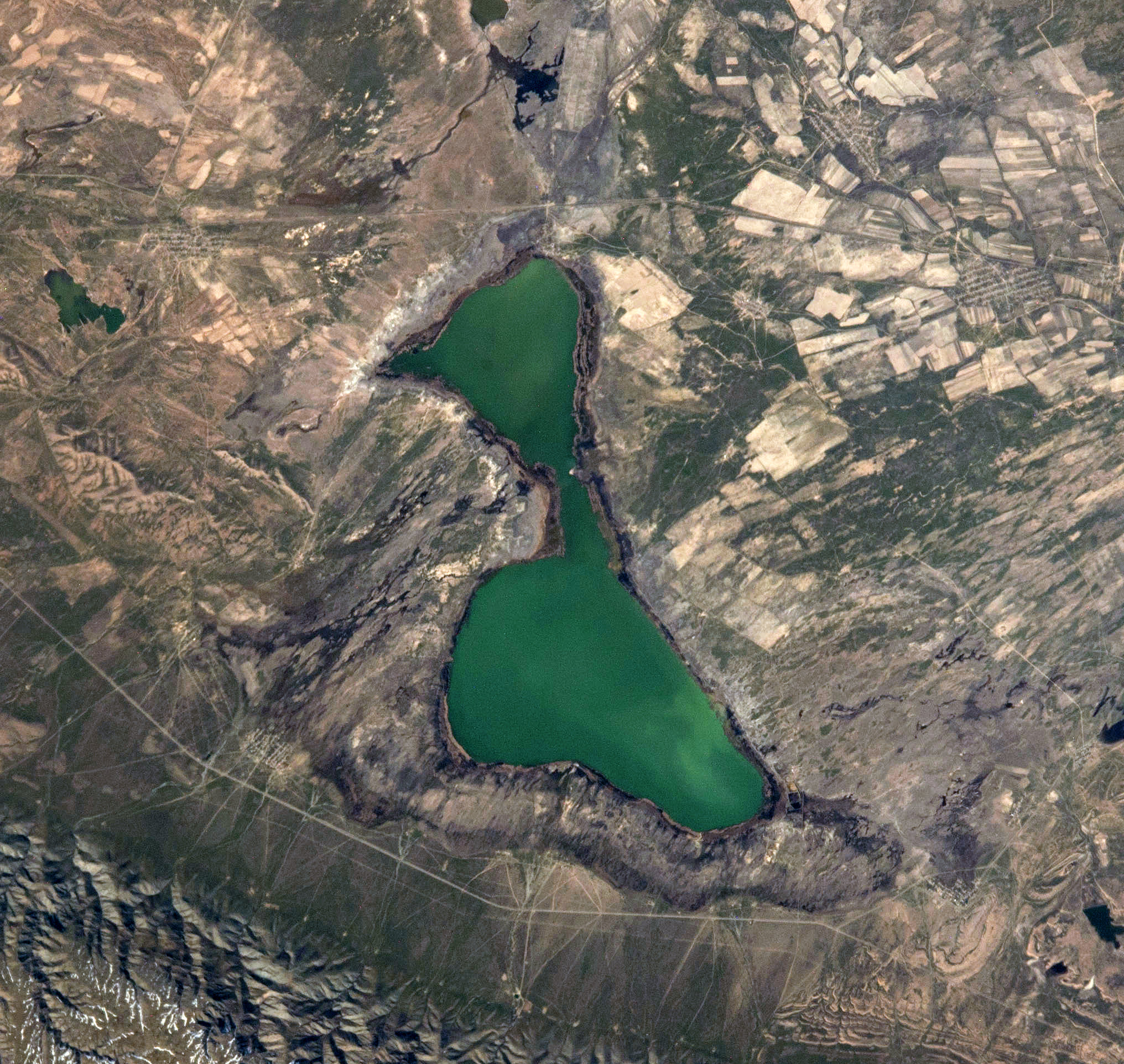
- ISS image of Bilikol

- Location within Kazakhstan
- Location: Karatau Mountains
- Coordinates: 43°02′N 70°42′E
- Type: Fluvial lake
- Primary inflows: Asa
- Primary outflows: Asa
- Basin countries: Kazakhstan
- Max. length: 18 kilometers (11 mi)
- Max. width: 7.5 kilometers (4.7 mi)
- Surface area: 85 square kilometers (33 sq mi)
- Max. depth: 8 meters (26 ft)
- Surface elevation: 438 meters (1,437 ft)

Bilikol (Kazakh: Билікөл; Russian: Биликоль) is a freshwater lake in the Zhambyl Region, Kazakhstan.

The lake lies 70 kilometers (43 mi) northwest of the city of Taraz. Its waters are used by the surrounding communities to irrigate crops.

== Geography ==
Lake Bilikol has a shape that roughly reminds of an hourglass. Lying in a tectonic depression on the northern slope of the Karatau Mountains, it is part of the Talas basin. The Asa river flows through the lake entering it from the east and flowing out from the north. The shores of the lake are sandy in places. Lake Akkol lies 40 kilometers (25 mi) to the north of the northern end of Bilikol.

== Flora and fauna ==
Reeds grow on the lakeshore. The main fish species found in the lake are carp, common bream and grass carp, among others.

== See also ==
- List of lakes of Kazakhstan
