= Kök-Say =

Kök-Say Көк-Сай
- Location within Kyrgyzstan
- Coordinates: 42°30′00″N 71°06′36″E
- Country: Kyrgyzstan
- Region: Talas
- District: Kara-Buura
- Elevation: 1,251 m (4,104 ft)

Population (2021)
  - Total: 4,991
- Time zone: UTC+6

Kök-Say (Kyrgyz: Көк-Сай [kœksɑ́j]) is a village in the Talas Region of Kyrgyzstan. It is part of the Kara-Buura District. Its population was 4,991 in 2021.
