= Akkol, Talas District =

Akkol Ақкөл
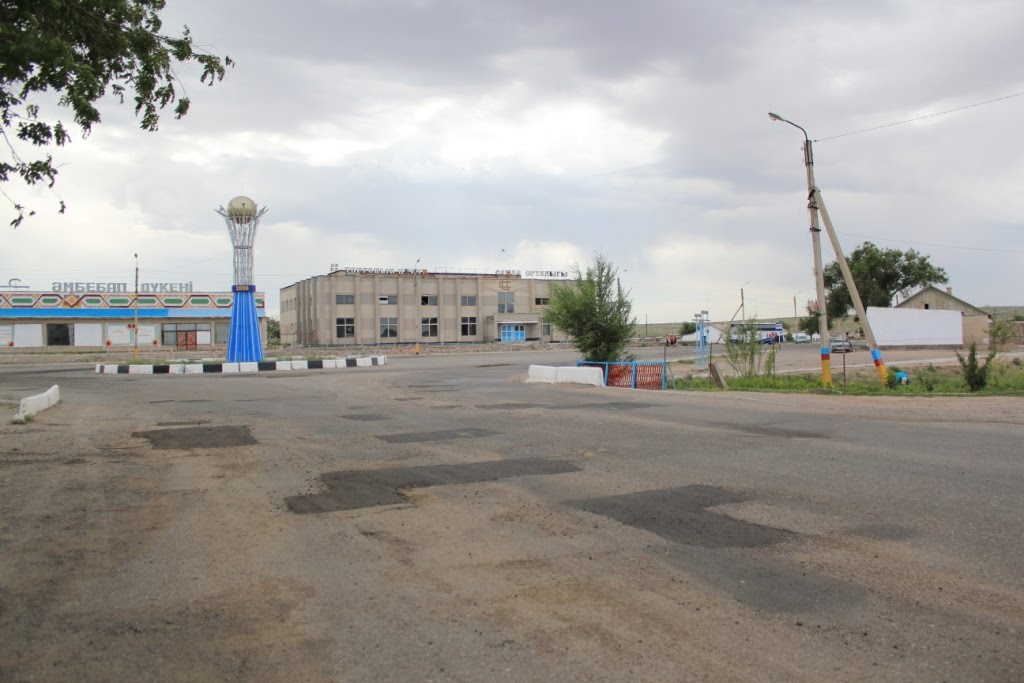

- Location within Kazakhstan
- Coordinates: 43°26′03″N 70°46′21″E
- Country: Kazakhstan
- Regions of Kazakhstan: Zhambyl Region
- Districts of Kazakhstan: Talas District

Population (2009)
  - Total: 2,327
- Time zone: UTC+6 (East Kazakhstan Time)

Akkol (Kazakh: Ақкөл, Chinese: 阿科尔) is a town in the Talas District, Zhambyl Region, Kazakhstan. Since 1977, it is part of Akkol rural district (КАТО code — 316231100).

== Demographics ==
According to the 2009 Kazakhstan census, the town has a population of 2327 people. In 1999 the town had a population of 3103.

== Geography ==
The town is 38 kilometers (24 mi) northeast of the district center, the city of Karatau. Two lakes are in the vicinity, Akkol to the southwest and Ashchykol 9 kilometers (5.6 mi) to the northwest.
