= Amanbaev =

Amanbaev Аманбаев
- Location within Kyrgyzstan
- Coordinates: 42°36′0″N 71°12′0″E
- Country: Kyrgyzstan
- Region: Talas
- District: Kara-Buura
- Elevation: 1,001 m (3,284 ft)

Population (2021)
  - Total: 6,635
- Time zone: UTC+6

Amanbaev (Kyrgyz: Аманбаев, Russian: Аманбаево, romanized: Amanbayevo, former name: Groznoye) is a village in the Talas Region of Kyrgyzstan. It is part of the Kara-Buura District. Its population was 6,635 in 2021. It is located on the country north-west border with the Jambyl Region of Kazakhstan.

== Population ==
Historical population
Year	Pop.	±% p.a.
2009	6,203	—
2021	6,635	+0.56%
Note: resident population; Sources:
