= Akkol, Zerendi District =

Akkol Ақкөл (Kazakh) Акколь (Russian)
- Village
- Location in Kazakhstan
- Coordinates: 53°17′44″N 69°36′11″E
- Country: Kazakhstan
- Region: Akmola Region

Population (2009)
  - Total: 1,140
- Time zone: UTC+6 (ALMT)
- Area code: 7172
- Vehicle registration: C, O, W and 03 (region)

Akkol (Kazakh: Ақкөл) is a village in Zerendi District, Akmola Region, in northern part of Kazakhstan. The KATO code is 115633100.

== Demographics ==
=== Population ===
Population: 1,121 (1999 census results). (546 males and 575 females). As of 2009, the population of Akkol was 1140 inhabitants (547 males and 593 females).
