= Aqkol, Atyrau =

Aqkol Aқкөl
- Location within Kazakhstan
- Coordinates: 46°39′18″N 49°03′26″E
- Country: Kazakhstan
- Region: Atyrau
- Elevation: −18 m (−59 ft)

Population (2009)
  - Total: 4,596
- Time zone: UTC+5 (West Kazakhstan Time)

Aqkol, also spelled Akkol, (Kazakh: Aқкөl, Aqköl) is a town in Atyrau Region, southwestern Kazakhstan. It lies at an altitude of 18 m (59 ft) below sea level.
