= Aitmatov District =

Coordinates: 42°37′N 71°35′E

Aitmatov Айтматов району
- District
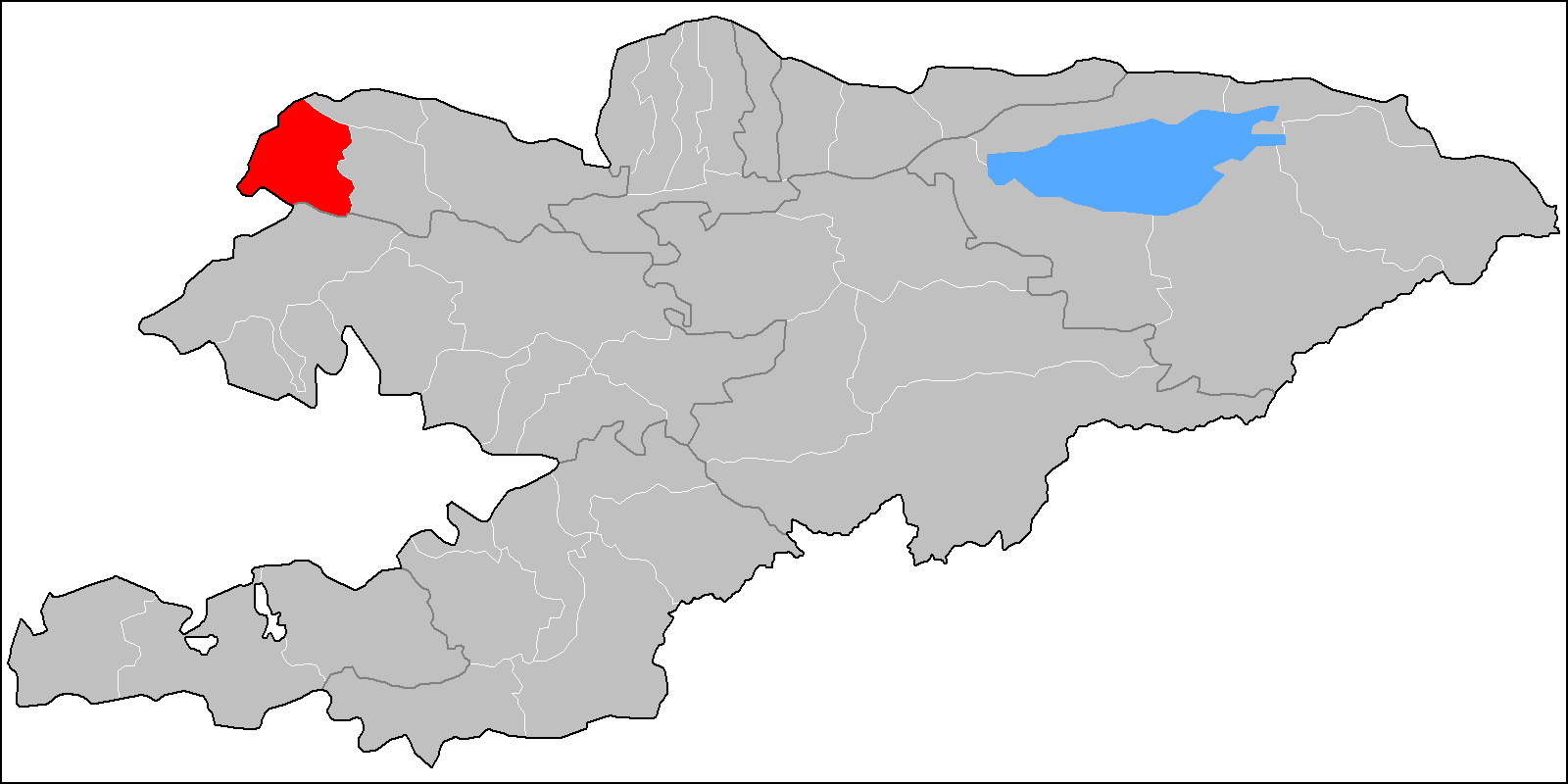
- Country: Kyrgyzstan
- Region: Talas Region

Area
  - Total: 4,216 km^{2} (1,628 sq mi)

Population (2021)
  - Total: 69,180
  - Density: 16.41/km^{2} (42.50/sq mi)
- Time zone: UTC+6

Aitmatov (Kyrgyz: Айтматов району, romanized: Aitmatov rayonu) (formerly as Kara-Buura) is a district of Talas Region, in north-western Kyrgyzstan. Its area is 4,216 square kilometres (1,628 sq mi), and its resident population was 69,180 in 2021. The administrative seat lies at Kyzyl-Adyr. In 2023, by decision of the Jogorku Kenesh it was renamed Aitmatov district after Chinghiz Aitmatov (1928-2008), who was born in this district.

== Population ==
Historical population
Year	Pop.	±% p.a.
1970	35,841	—
1979	41,270	+1.58%
1989	47,272	+1.37%
1999	49,879	+0.54%
2009	58,056	+1.53%
2021	69,180	+1.47%
Note: resident population; Sources:

== Rural communities and villages ==
In total, Aitmatov District includes 23 settlements in 10 rural communities (ayyl aymagy). Each rural community can consist of one or several villages. The rural communities and settlements in the Aitmatov District are:

1. Ak-Chiy (seat: Joon-Döbö; incl. Jiyde)
2. Amanbaev (seat: Amanbaev; incl. Ak-Jar, Satykey and Suulu-Maymak)
3. Bakayyr (seat: Ak-Bashat; incl. Kara-Say)
4. Bakyyan (seat: Bakyyan; incl. Tamchy-Bulak and Kamash)
5. Beysheke (seat: Beysheke; incl. Kara-Buura and Kara-Suu)
6. Cholponbay (seat: Chymgent; incl. Kök-Döbö)
7. Kara-Buura (seat: Kyzyl-Adyr; incl. Chong-Kara-Buura and Üch-Bulak)
8. Kök-Say (seat: Kök-Say; incl. Kaynar)
9. Maymak (seat: Maymak)
10. Sheker (seat: Sheker; incl. Archagul)
Settlements of the Kara-Buura District.
