= Lake Akkol =

Lake in Kazakhstan

Akkol
- Ақкөл
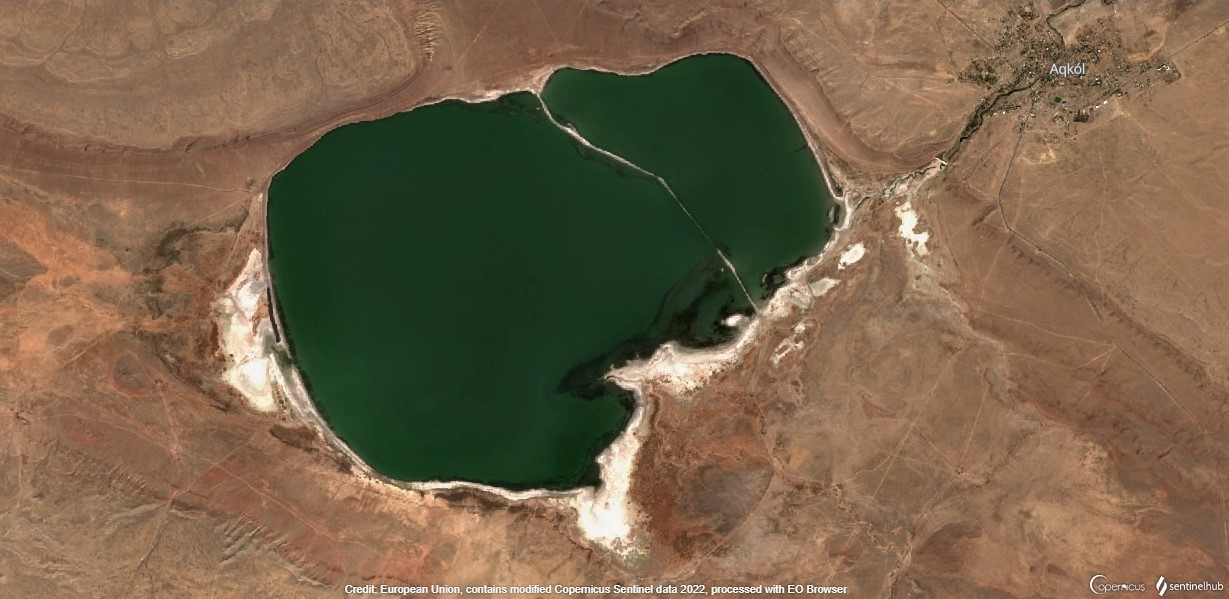

- Location in Kazakhstan
- Location: Talas District
- Coordinates: 43.403°N 70.687°E
- Primary inflows: Asa
- Primary outflows: Asa
- Basin countries: Kazakhstan
- Max. length: 14 kilometers (8.7 mi)
- Max. width: 7.6 kilometers (4.7 mi)
- Surface area: 52 square kilometers (20 sq mi)
- Average depth: 3 meters (9.8 ft)
- Max. depth: 5 meters (16 ft)
- Surface elevation: 397 meters (1,302 ft)

Akkol is a lake in the Talas District, Zhambyl Region, southern Kazakhstan.

It is located close to the southwest of Akkol village. In the summer, the lakeshores are a vacationing spot.

There are two ways to translate the toponym: most often its meaning is "white lake" in the Kazakh language.

== Geography ==
The lake is roughly 14 kilometers (8.7 mi) by 7.6 kilometers (4.7 mi) and lies at an altitude of 397 meters (1,302 ft) above sea level. Its depth ranges from 3 meters (9.8 ft) to 5 meters (16 ft). Ashchykol lies 7 kilometers (4.3 mi) to the northwest. The Asa River flows into Akkol, after flowing out of lake Bilikol located 30 kilometers (19 mi) to the south of the lake. Lake Akkol freezes from late December to late March.

== Fauna ==
The main fish species in the lake are bream, carp, crucian carp, roach, and zander.
