= Talas District, Kazakhstan =

Talas Талас
- District
- Talas audany
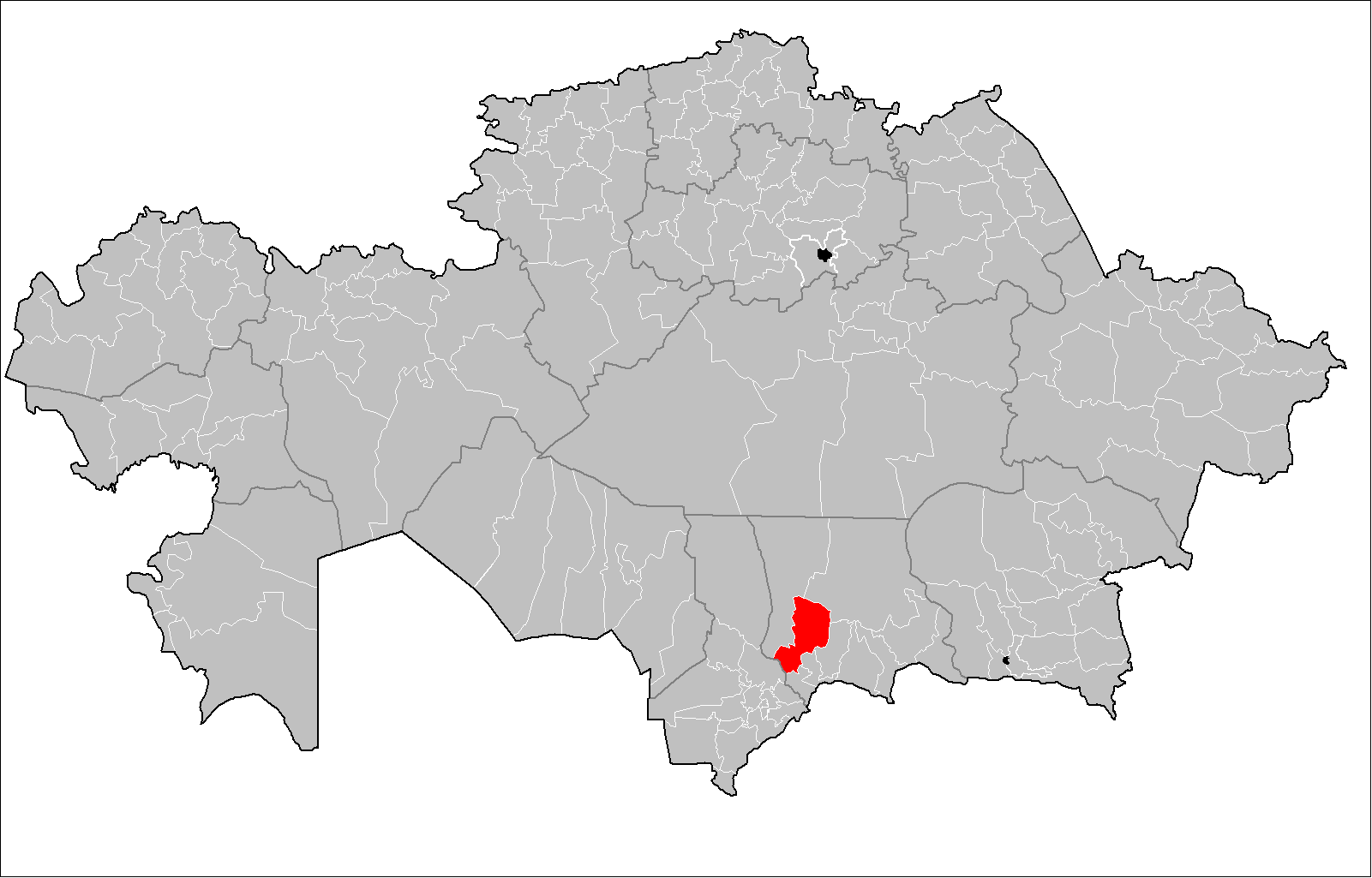
- Location of Talas District, Kazakhstan in Kazakhstan
- Coordinates: 43°48′N 70°43′E
- Country: Kazakhstan
- Region: Jambyl Region
- Administrative center: Karatau

Population (2013)
  - Total: 52,090
- Time zone: UTC+6 (East)

Talas (Kazakh: Талас ауданы, Talas audany) is a district of Jambyl Region in south-eastern Kazakhstan. The administrative center of the district is the town of Karatau.

== Geography ==
Akkol village and Lake Akkol are located in the district.
