= Sheker =

Sheker Шекер
- Location within Kyrgyzstan
- Coordinates: 42°31′48″N 71°9′0″E
- Country: Kyrgyzstan
- Region: Talas
- District: Kara-Buura
- Elevation: 1,167 m (3,829 ft)

Population (2021)
  - Total: 4,532
- Time zone: UTC+6

Sheker (Kyrgyz: Шекер) is a village in the Kara-Buura District of Talas Region of Kyrgyzstan. Its population was 4,532 in 2021. It is the birthplace of Chinghiz Aitmatov.
