= Birdik, Ysyk-Ata =

Birdik Бирдик
- Location within Kyrgyzstan
- Coordinates: 42°57′36″N 74°52′48″E
- Country: Kyrgyzstan
- Region: Chüy Region
- District: Ysyk-Ata District
- Elevation: 666 m (2,185 ft)

Population (2021)
  - Total: 2,076

Birdik (formerly: Denisovka) is a village in the Chüy Region of Kyrgyzstan. Its population was 2,076 in 2021.
