= Talas, Kyrgyzstan =

Talas
- Seal
- Interactive map of Talas
- Location in Kyrgyzstan
- Coordinates: 42°31′N 72°14′E
- Country: Kyrgyzstan
- Region: Talas Region

Area
  - Total: 13 km^{2} (5.0 sq mi)
- Elevation: 1,244 m (4,081 ft)

Population (2021)
  - Total: 40,308
  - Density: 3,100/km^{2} (8,000/sq mi)
- Time zone: UTC+6 (KGT)
- Website: http://talas.kg

Talas (/təˈlɑːs/; Kyrgyz: [tʰɑɫɑ́s]) is a town in northwestern Kyrgyzstan, located in the Talas river valley between two mountain ranges. Its area is 13 square kilometres (5.0 sq mi), and its resident population was 40,308 in 2021. It is the administrative headquarters of Talas Region. The town was founded by East Slavic settlers in 1877. To the south is the Besh-Tash (‘five rocks’) valley with the Besh-Tash National Park.

== History ==
In 751, the Battle of Talas was fought nearby between armies of the Abbasid Caliphate and Tibet against the Tang dynasty. The Abbasids and Tibet defeated the Chinese Empire.

== Overview ==
Its economy has traditionally been oriented towards the ancient city of Taraz (formerly named Talas and Dzhambul) in present day Kazakhstan. The Talas valley has suffered severely from the imposition of rigid border controls by Kazakhstan following the demise of the Soviet Union, as transport and trade links to the rest of Kyrgyzstan are now constrained by the mountains separating it from the Chüy Valley and Bishkek. Though much transportation does occur from Bishkek to Talas by transiting through Kazakhstan via the border crossings at Chaldybar in Chüy and then re-crossing into the Talas valley of Kyrgyzstan at Taraz. The only drivable road within the borders of Kyrgyzstan to Bishkek and the rest of the country crosses two mountain passes that rise to heights of more than 3000 meters above sea level over the Ötmök Pass into the Suusamyr Valley and then again the Töö Ashuu Pass before descending to the Chüy Valley and Bishkek.

== Population ==
Historical population
Year	Pop.	±% p.a.
1970	20,099	—
1979	22,415	+1.22%
1989	30,520	+3.13%
1999	32,638	+0.67%
2009	32,886	+0.08%
2021	40,308	+1.71%
Note: resident population; Sources:

== Climate ==
Talas has a cool semi-arid climate (Köppen BSk), bordering on a humid continental climate, with freezing winters and very warm summers.

Climate data for Talas, Kyrgyzstan (1991–2020, extremes 1949–present)
Month	Jan	Feb	Mar	Apr	May	Jun	Jul	Aug	Sep	Oct	Nov	Dec	Year
Record high °C (°F)	18.8 (65.8)	24.6 (76.3)	28.0 (82.4)	34.0 (93.2)	34.7 (94.5)	37.2 (99.0)	40.1 (104.2)	37.5 (99.5)	36.1 (97.0)	32.4 (90.3)	28.2 (82.8)	20.3 (68.5)	40.1 (104.2)
Mean daily maximum °C (°F)	2.6 (36.7)	4.1 (39.4)	10.4 (50.7)	17.0 (62.6)	22.0 (71.6)	26.7 (80.1)	28.7 (83.7)	27.8 (82.0)	23.4 (74.1)	17.3 (63.1)	9.9 (49.8)	4.2 (39.6)	16.2 (61.1)
Daily mean °C (°F)	−4.2 (24.4)	−2.4 (27.7)	3.7 (38.7)	10.1 (50.2)	15.2 (59.4)	19.5 (67.1)	21.3 (70.3)	19.8 (67.6)	14.7 (58.5)	8.8 (47.8)	2.5 (36.5)	−2.5 (27.5)	8.9 (48.0)
Mean daily minimum °C (°F)	−9.5 (14.9)	−7.6 (18.3)	−1.7 (28.9)	3.9 (39.0)	8.3 (46.9)	12.2 (54.0)	13.7 (56.7)	12.0 (53.6)	6.9 (44.4)	2.1 (35.8)	−2.8 (27.0)	−7.5 (18.5)	2.5 (36.5)
Record low °C (°F)	−31.7 (−25.1)	−35.0 (−31.0)	−24.0 (−11.2)	−10.5 (13.1)	−7.8 (18.0)	2.3 (36.1)	5.4 (41.7)	−0.5 (31.1)	−3.6 (25.5)	−13.4 (7.9)	−32.2 (−26.0)	−30.0 (−22.0)	−35.0 (−31.0)
Average precipitation mm (inches)	15 (0.6)	19 (0.7)	32 (1.3)	52 (2.0)	46 (1.8)	32 (1.3)	15 (0.6)	12 (0.5)	14 (0.6)	23 (0.9)	28 (1.1)	19 (0.7)	313 (12.3)
Average precipitation days (≥ 1.0 mm)	4.4	4.6	7.3	8.0	8.1	5.2	4.1	1.8	2.5	5.0	5.0	4.0	60.0
Average relative humidity (%)	67	70	72	66	60	55	51	50	51	58	66	67	61
Source 1: Pogoda.ru.net
Source 2: Deutscher Wetterdienst (precipitation days and humidity 1961–1990)

== Manas ==
Manas, the mythical Kyrgyz national hero, is said to have been born in the Ala Too mountains in Talas oblast. A few kilometres outside Talas lies a mausoleum, supposedly that of Manas, called the Kümböz Manas. However, the inscription on its richly decorated facade dedicates it to "...the most glorious of women Kenizek-Khatun, the daughter of the Emir Abuka". Legend explains that Manas' wife Kanikey ordered a deliberately false inscription in order to mislead her husband's enemies and prevent the desecration of his body. The building, known as Manastin Khumbuzu or The Ghumbez of Manas, is thought to have been built in 1334. It now contains a museum dedicated to the epic. A ceremonial mound also lies nearby.

== Sports ==
The town has a bandy club.

- FC Namys-APK, football club

== Notable people ==
- Gulsaira Momunova

== Bibliography ==
- Kyzlasov I.L., "Runic Scripts of Eurasian Steppes", Moscow, Eastern Literature, 1994, ISBN 5-02-017741-5
