= Aqkol, Aktobe =

Aqkol Ақкөл Акколь اقكول
- Location within Kazakhstan
- Coordinates: 49°56′44″N 60°33′15″E
- Country: Kazakhstan
- Region: Aktobe
- Elevation: 236 m (774 ft)
- Time zone: UTC+5 (West Kazakhstan Time)
  - Summer (DST): UTC+5 (West Kazakhstan Time)

Aqkol, also known as Akkol', (Kazakh: Ақкөл, Aqköl, اقكول; Russian: Акколь, Akkol', Chinese: 阿科尔) is a town in Aktobe Region, west Kazakhstan. It lies at an altitude of 236 m (774 ft).
