= Talas Ala-Too =

Mountain range in the western Tian Shan

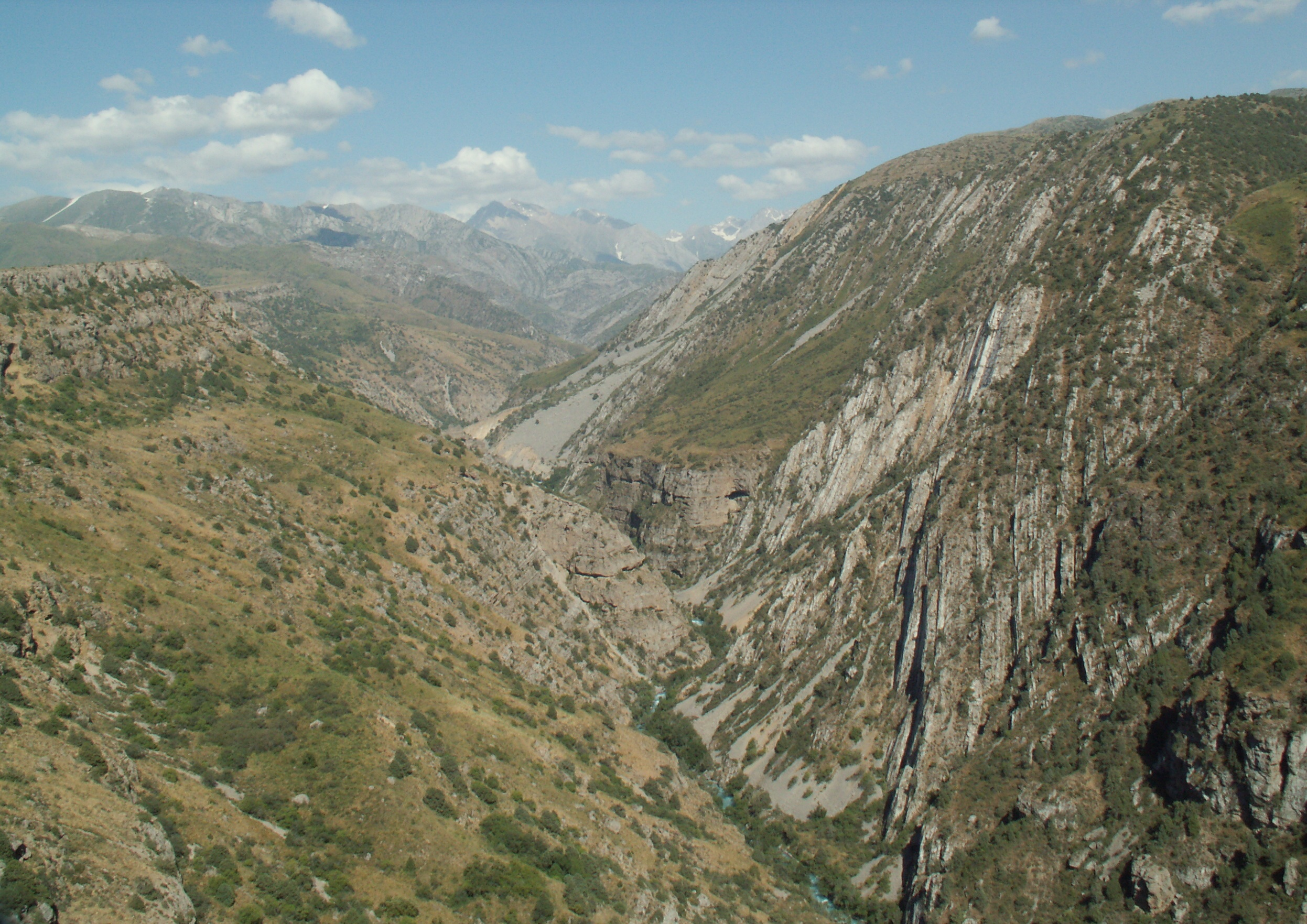

Highest point
- Peak: Mount Manas
- Elevation: 4,482 m (14,705 ft)

Dimensions
- Length: 260 km (160 mi) east–west
- Width: 40 km (25 mi)

Naming
- Native name: Талас Ала-Тоосу (Kyrgyz); Талас Алатауы (Kazakh)

Geography
- Location of the Talas Ala-Too in Kyrgyzstan
- Countries: Kyrgyzstan; Kazakhstan
- Range coordinates: 42.308927°N 71.027212°E
- Parent range: Tian Shan

The Talas Ala-Too (Kyrgyz: Талас Ала-Тоосу, romanized: Talas Ala-Toosu; Kazakh: Талас Алатауы, romanized: Talas Alatauy) is a mountain range in the Tian Shan, extending across northwestern Kyrgyzstan and into southern Kazakhstan. It forms the southern and eastern margins of Talas Region, separating the Talas valley to the north from the mountain ranges and valleys of the western Tian Shan and the western part of the Inner Tian Shan to the south. The range is approximately 260 kilometres (160 mi) long and up to 40 kilometres (25 mi) wide. Its highest point is Mount Manas, at 4,482 metres (14,705 ft).

== Geography ==
The range branches off from the Kyrgyz Ala-Too near the headwaters of the Korumdu River and extends westwards towards the Karatau at Chakpak Pass. Its southwestern end connects with the Pskem Mountains and the Ugam Range.

The range is approximately 260–270 kilometres (160–170 mi) long, with an average elevation of 3,930 metres (12,890 ft). Mount Manas, near the junction with the Ugam Range, reaches 4,482 metres (14,705 ft). The average elevation is approximately 3,930 metres (12,890 ft). Mount Manas stands near the junction with the Ugam Range; its elevation is given as 4,482 metres (14,705 ft) in both encyclopedias and 4,488 metres (14,724 ft) in the 1964 monograph.

West of Ötmök Pass, the ridge follows a pronounced zigzag course. Its crest is rocky and locally narrow, with jagged landforms and sharply ridged pyramidal peaks. Lateral spurs are often subdivided into smaller branches, separated by deep gorges. Alpine, erosional and erosional-depositional landforms are widespread.

The slopes are asymmetric: the northern slope is broad, whereas the southern slope is steep and comparatively short. The northern slope is dissected by the valleys and gorges of the Kürküröö, Kara-Buura, Ürmaral, Besh-Tash, Kalba and Üch-Koshoy rivers. The headwaters of the Chatkal and Sandalash extend deeply into the western part of the southern slope.

Spurs extending north and northeast from the northwestern part of the range include Archaluu (3,377 metres (11,079 ft)), Üch-Bulak (3,469 metres (11,381 ft)), Bakayyr-Choku (4,451 metres (14,603 ft)) and Kök-Kyya (3,140 metres (10,300 ft)). Southeastern spurs include Italbars (2,293 metres (7,523 ft)), Bashka-Suu (2,565 metres (8,415 ft)) and Arpa-Tektir (3,206 metres (10,518 ft)).

Passes across the range include Ötmök, at 3,330 metres (10,930 ft), Besh-Tash and Kara-Buura.

== Geology ==
The range consists mainly of Precambrian metamorphic schists and limestone, together with various Paleozoic sedimentary and volcanic rocks. Granitoids are widespread in its northwestern part. Intermontane depressions and river valleys contain Neogene red beds and Quaternary alluvial and glacial deposits.

The Talas–Fergana Fault crosses the range at Kara-Buura Pass, dividing it into two geological sectors. The northeastern sector belongs to the Karatau–Talas structural-facies zone of the Northern Tian Shan, while the western sector belongs to the Chatkal–Naryn zone of the Middle Tian Shan. Deposits of lead, zinc, copper and tin are known in the range.

== Climate ==
The climate is dry and temperate continental, with substantial variation according to elevation. At the foot of the range, mean January temperatures are approximately −8 to −7 °C (18 to 19 °F), while mean July temperatures are 20 to 22 °C (68 to 72 °F). Annual precipitation there is approximately 200 to 300 millimetres (7.9 to 11.8 in).

At elevations of 1,300 to 2,500 metres (4,300 to 8,200 ft), the mean annual temperature is 6 to 7 °C (43 to 45 °F), and annual precipitation is 300 to 400 millimetres (12 to 16 in). Precipitation increases to 400 to 700 millimetres (16 to 28 in) at elevations of 2,500 to 3,200 metres (8,200 to 10,500 ft), reaching approximately 800 millimetres (31 in) in the glacial and nival belt.

== Glaciers ==
The northern slope has been reported to contain 202 glaciers with a combined area of 120.7 square kilometres (46.6 sq mi). These include Manas Glacier, covering 6.4 square kilometres (2.5 sq mi), and Vokrug Sveta Glacier, covering 6.8 square kilometres (2.6 sq mi).

== Vegetation and land use ==
Vegetation and soils vary with elevation. Wormwood–ephemeral semi-desert occurs on typical grey soils at approximately 900 to 1,000 metres (3,000 to 3,300 ft); land in this belt is also used for grain cultivation and orchards. Steppe on light chestnut soils extends from approximately 1,100 metres (3,600 ft) to 1,900–2,200 metres (6,200–7,200 ft), with feather grasses, fescues and other herbaceous plants.

Meadow steppe on mountain chernozem soils occurs at 2,200 to 2,600 metres (7,200 to 8,500 ft). Subalpine meadows, including grasses, flowering herbs and prostrate juniper, occupy elevations of approximately 2,700 to 3,200 metres (8,900 to 10,500 ft). Alpine meadow steppe extends from 3,200 to 3,800 metres (10,500 to 12,500 ft), above which lies the glacial and nival belt.

Coniferous woodland, juniper and open woodland occur in the Ürmaral basin at elevations of 2,000 to 2,900 metres (6,600 to 9,500 ft) and in the Besh-Tash basin at 1,950 to 2,900 metres (6,400 to 9,510 ft). The mountain grasslands are used as pasture.
