= Kyzyl-Adyr =

Kyzyl-Adyr Кызыл-Адыр
- Location within Kyrgyzstan
- Coordinates: 42°37′12″N 71°35′24″E
- Country: Kyrgyzstan
- Region: Talas
- District: Kara-Buura
- Elevation: 871 m (2,858 ft)

Population (2021)
  - Total: 13,612
- Time zone: UTC+6

Kyzyl-Adyr (Kyrgyz: Кызыл-Адыр, formerly Kirovka) is a village in the Kara-Buura District of Talas Region of Kyrgyzstan. It is the seat of the Kara-Buura District. Its population was 13,612 in 2021. To the north is the Kirovskaya Reservoir. From the main east–west highway through Talas Region, one road goes north to Taraz in Kazakhstan and another goes south to Jalal-Abad Region over the Kara-Buura Pass to the Chatkal Valley (Jangy-Bazar and Kanysh-Kyya).

== Climate ==
Climate data for Kyzyl-Adyr (1991–2020)
Month	Jan	Feb	Mar	Apr	May	Jun	Jul	Aug	Sep	Oct	Nov	Dec	Year
Daily mean °C (°F)	−1.3 (29.7)	1.1 (34.0)	7.9 (46.2)	14.3 (57.7)	18.9 (66.0)	23.5 (74.3)	25.6 (78.1)	24.1 (75.4)	19.5 (67.1)	12.8 (55.0)	6.0 (42.8)	0.5 (32.9)	12.7 (54.9)
Source: NOAA

== Population ==
Historical population
Year	Pop.	±% p.a.
2009	10,789	—
2021	13,612	+1.96%
Note: resident population; Sources:
