= Asa (Kazakhstan) =

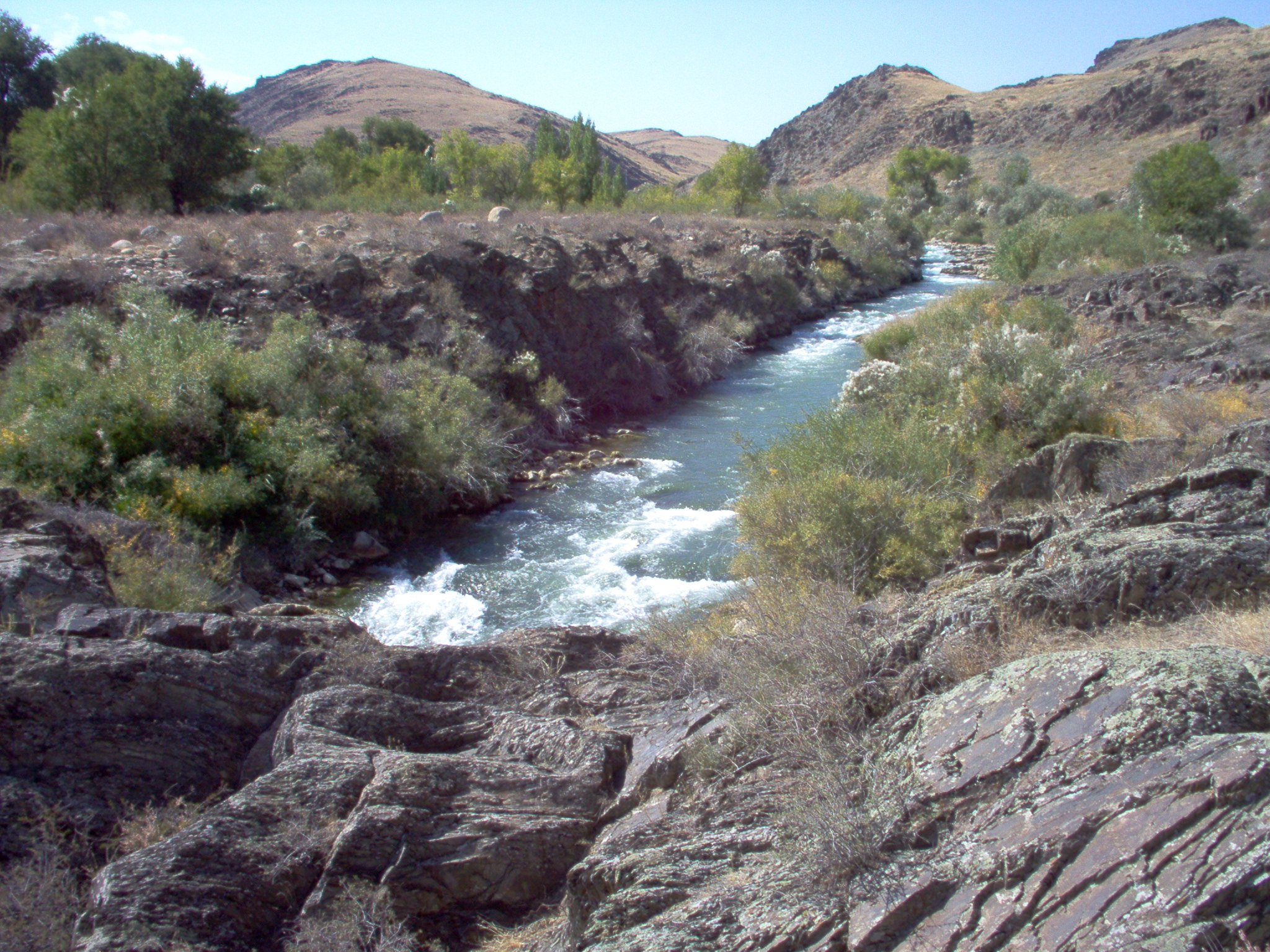

Location
- Country: Kazakhstan

Physical characteristics
- Source: Karatau Mountains
- Mouth: Muyunkum Desert
  - coordinates: 43.9202°N 70.2066°E
- Length: 253 km (157 mi)
- Basin size: 9,210 km^{2} (3,560 sq mi)

The Asa (Kazakh: Аса, Asa) is a river of Kazakhstan.

== Course ==
The river has its source in the Karatau Mountains. It flows through lakes Bilikol and Akkol. Further downstream it vanishes in the Muyunkum Desert before reaching the river Talas. The river is 253 kilometres (157 mi) long and has a basin area of 9,210 square kilometres (3,560 sq mi).
