= Talas Region =

Region of Kyrgyzstan

Talas Region: Талас облусу (Kyrgyz); Таласская область (Russian)
- Region
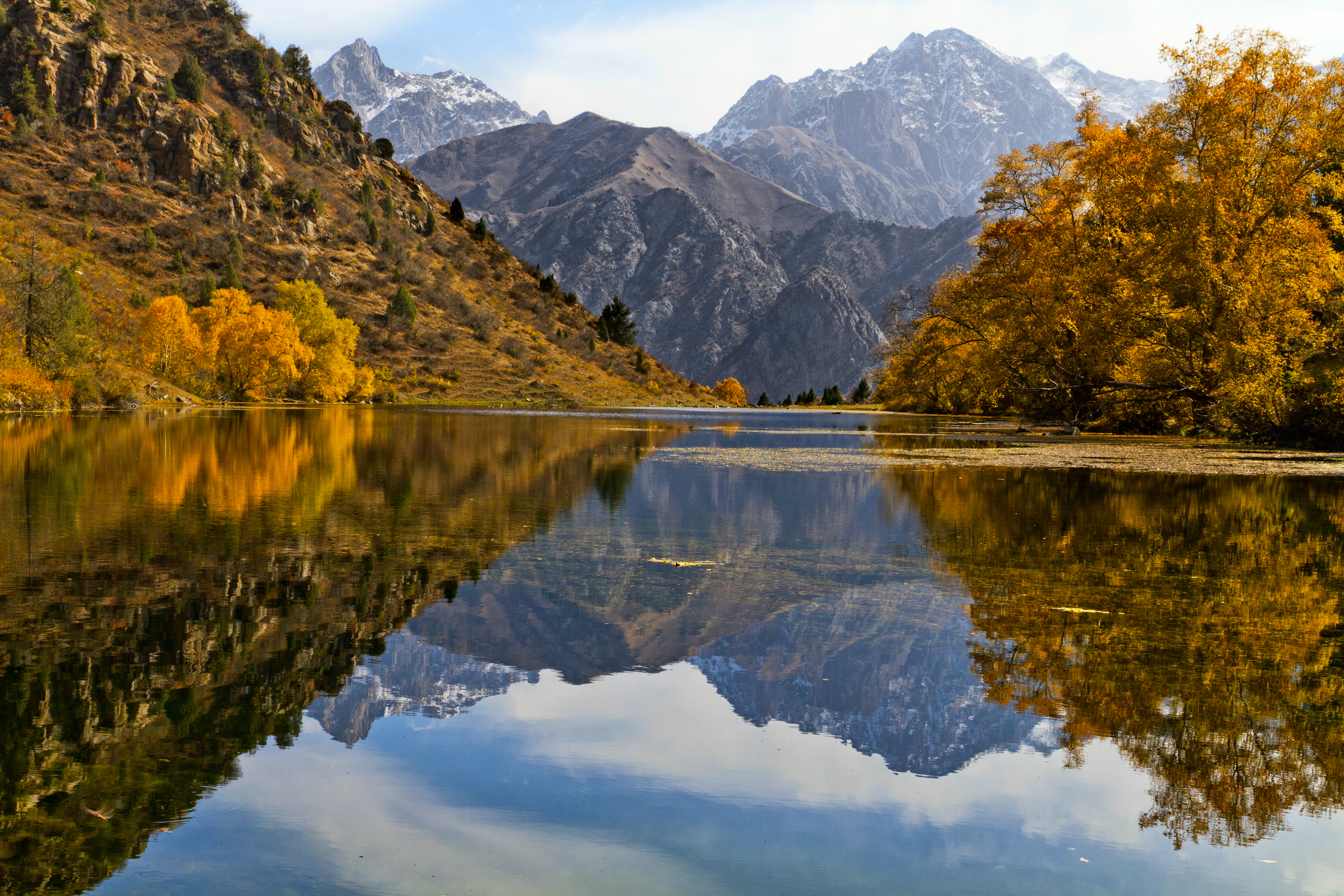
- Landscape in Talas Region

- Flag Coat of arms

- Map of Kyrgyzstan, location of Talas Province highlighted
- Coordinates: 42°30′N 72°30′E
- Country: Kyrgyzstan
- Capital: Talas

Government
  - Gubernator: Nurlan Dardanov

Area
  - Total: 13,406 km^{2} (5,176 sq mi)

Population (2023-01-01)
  - Total: 273,509
  - Density: 20.402/km^{2} (52.841/sq mi)
- Time zone: UTC+6 (KGT)
- ISO 3166 code: KG-T
- Districts: 4
- Cities: 1
- Villages: 90

Talas (Kyrgyz: Талас облусу, romanized: Talas oblusu; Russian: Таласская область, romanized: Talasskaya oblast) is a region (oblast) of Kyrgyzstan. Its capital is Talas. It is bordered on the west and north by Jambyl Region of Kazakhstan, on the east by Chüy Region, on the south by Jalal-Abad Region and on the southwest by a finger of Uzbekistan. Its total area is 13,406 km^{2} (5,176 sq mi). The resident population of the region was 270,994 as of January 2021.

During the 8th-century, the Battle of Talas between the Abbasid Caliphate and the Tang dynasty was fought here, which culminated in Abbasid victory that led to the Islamization of Central Asia and subsequent abandonment of Buddhism in the region.

== Geography ==
The Talas Region is a U-shaped valley open to the west. The northern border is defined by the Kyrgyz Ala-Too, which also forms the Chuy Region's southern border. At the eastern end, the Talas Ala-Too Range splits off and marks the southern border. The river Talas flows through the center of the valley. Kirov Reservoir is formed by damming the Talas river. The main highway (A361) enters from the east over the Ötmök Pass (Can become impassible during winter due to weather) and goes down the valley to Taraz in Kazakhstan. Near the valley's mouth at Kyzyl-Adyr, one road goes north toward Taraz and the other south over the Kara-Buura Pass to Jalal-Abad Province. Before independence most trade links were with Taraz.

== Divisions ==
The Talas Region is divided administratively into one city of regional significance (Talas), and four districts:

District	Seat	Map
Bakay-Ata District	Bakay-Ata	
Kara-Buura District	Kyzyl-Adyr	
Manas District	Pokrovka	
Talas District	Manas	

There are no cities of district significance or urban-type settlements in the region.

== Basic Socio-Economic Indicators ==
The economically active population of Talas Region in 2009 was 98,815, of which 93,499 employed and 5,316 (5.4%) unemployed.

- Export: 14.6 million US dollars (2008)
- Import: 193.3 million US dollars (2008)
- Direct Foreign Investments: 30,4 million US dollars (in 2008)

== Demographics ==
The population of Talas Region, according to the Population and Housing Census of 2009, amounted to 219.6 thousand (enumerated de facto population) or 226.8 thousand (de jure population). The region's estimated population for the beginning of 2021 was 270,994.

Historical populations in Talas Region
Year	Pop.	±%
1970	140,747	—
1979	163,492	+16.2%
1989	192,509	+17.7%
1999	199,872	+3.8%
2009	226,779	+13.5%
2021	270,994	+19.5%
Note: resident population; Sources:

=== Ethnic composition ===
According to the 2009 Census, the ethnic composition of the Talas Region (de jure population) was:

Ethnic group	Population	Proportion of Talas Province population
Kyrgyz	208,399	91.9%
Kurds	5,547	2.5%
Russians	4,356	1.9%
Kazakhs	3,049	1.3%
Uzbeks	1,779	0.8%
Turks	1,547	0.7%
Ukrainians	500	0.2%
Germans	384	0.2%
Tatars	299	0.1%
other groups	919	0.4%
