= Vasilyevka (rural locality) =

Vasilyevka is the name of several rural localities in Russia:

- Vasilyevka, Khabarsky District, Altai Krai
- Vasilyevka, Ust-Kalmansky District, Altai Krai
- Vasilyevka, Amur Oblast
- Vasilyevka, Arkhangelsky District, Republic of Bashkortostan
- Vasilyevka, Ishimbaysky District, Republic of Bashkortostan
- Vasilyevka, Meleuzovsky District, Republic of Bashkortostan
- Vasilyevka, Sharansky District, Republic of Bashkortostan
- Vasilyevka, Sterlitamaksky District, Republic of Bashkortostan
- Vasilyevka, Yermekeyevsky District, Republic of Bashkortostan
- Vasilyevka, Yermekeyevsky District, Republic of Bashkortostan
- Vasilyevka, Zilairsky District, Republic of Bashkortostan
- Vasilyevka, Konyshyovsky District, Kursk Oblast
- Vasilyevka, Lgovsky District, Kursk Oblast
- Vasilyevka, Permsky District, Perm Krai
- Vasilyevka, Sobinsky District, Vladimir Oblast
- Vasilyevka, Yuryev-Polsky District, Vladimir Oblast
- Vasilyevka, Volgograd Oblast
- Vasilyevka, Gryazovetsky District, Vologda Oblast
- Vasilyevka, Anninsky District, Voronezh Oblast
- Vasilyevka, Buturlinovsky District, Voronezh Oblast
- Vasilyevka, Ertilsky District, Voronezh Oblast
- Vasilyevka, Gribanovsky District, Voronezh Oblast

== See also ==
- Keken-Vasilyevka, Republic of Bashkortostan
- Novaya Vasilyevka, Republic of Bashkortostan
- Staraya Vasilyevka, Republic of Bashkortostan
- Vasilyevka 1-ya, Voronezh Oblast
