= Arslanovo =

Arslanovo may refer to the following rural localities in Russia:

- Arslanovo, Aurgazinsky District, Republic of Bashkortostan
- Arslanovo, Buzdyaksky District, Republic of Bashkortostan
- Arslanovo, Chishminsky District, Republic of Bashkortostan
- Arslanovo, Karmaskalinsky District, Republic of Bashkortostan
- Arslanovo, Kiginsky District, Republic of Bashkortostan
