= Göyçə =

- Yeni Göyçə,
- Göyçəkənd,
- Aşağı Göycəli,
- Göycəli, is a village and municipality in the Agstafa Rayon of Azerbaijan.
