= Oktyabr =

Oktyabr or Oktyabr' may refer to:

== Classical music ==
- October (Shostakovich) (Oktyabr), a 1967 symphonic poem by Dmitri Shostakovich
- October (Oktyabr), an opera by Vano Muradeli

== Places ==
- Oktyabr, Azerbaijan, former name of the village Göyçəkənd, Azerbaijan
- Oktyabr, Russia, several rural localities in Russia
- Zheltau (Akmola Region), known as Oktyabr until 2010

=== Kyrgyzstan ===
- Oktyabr, Chüy, a village in Alamüdün District, Chüy Region
- Oktyabr', Jalal-Abad, a village in Suzak District, Jalal-Abad Region
- Oktyabr, Alay, a village in Alay District, Osh Region
- Oktyabr, Kara-Kulja, a village in Kara-Kulja District, Osh Region

== Other uses ==
- Oktyabr (magazine), a Russian literary magazine
- Oktyabr (Yiddish newspaper), a Yiddish newspaper published in 1918–41
- October: Ten Days That Shook the World (1928), a film by Sergei Eisenstein
