= Vasilyevka =

Vasilyevka may refer to:

- Vasilyevka, former name of Ağçay, a village in Azerbaijan, until 1992
- Vasilyevka (rural locality), name of several rural localities in Russia
- Vasylivka, a town in Zaporizhia Oblast, Ukraine
- Vasilyevka, Kyrgyzstan, a village in Chuy Region, Kyrgyzstan
