= Kashka-Suu =

Kashka-Suu may refer to:

== Populated areas ==
- Kashka-Suu, Aksy, village in Aksy District, Jalal-Abad Province, Kyrgyzstan
- Kashka-Suu, Suzak, village in Suzak District, Jalal-Abad Province, Kyrgyzstan
- Kashka-Suu, Osh, village in Chong-Alay District, Osh Province, Kyrgyzstan
- Kashka-Suu, Alamüdün, village in Alamüdün District, Chuy Province, Kyrgyzstan

== Rivers ==
- Kashka Suu (river), right tributary of the Ala-Archa, Kyrgyzstan
