= Oktyabr, Russia =

Oktyabr (Russian: Октя́брь) is the name of several rural localities in Russia:

- Oktyabr, Baymaksky District, Republic of Bashkortostan, a village in Zilairsky Selsoviet of Baymaksky District of the Republic of Bashkortostan
- Oktyabr, Ishimbaysky District, Republic of Bashkortostan, a village in Isheyevsky Selsoviet of Ishimbaysky District of the Republic of Bashkortostan
- Oktyabr, Karmaskalinsky District, Republic of Bashkortostan, a village in Karlamansky Selsoviet of Karmaskalinsky District of the Republic of Bashkortostan
- Oktyabr, Kiginsky District, Republic of Bashkortostan, a village in Nizhnekiginsky Selsoviet of Kiginsky District of the Republic of Bashkortostan
- Oktyabr, Mishkinsky District, Republic of Bashkortostan, a village in Churayevsky Selsoviet of Mishkinsky District of the Republic of Bashkortostan
- Oktyabr, Bryansk Oblast, a settlement in Brakhlovsky Selsoviet of Klimovsky District of Bryansk Oblast
- Oktyabr, Chuvash Republic, a vyselok in Indyrchskoye Rural Settlement of Yantikovsky District of the Chuvash Republic
- Oktyabr, Kemerovo Oblast, a settlement in Kuzbasskaya Rural Territory of Novokuznetsky District of Kemerovo Oblast
- Oktyabr, Kirov Oblast, a selo in Oktyabrsky Rural Okrug of Podosinovsky District of Kirov Oblast
- Oktyabr, Kurgan Oblast, a village in Krasnozvezdinsky Selsoviet of Shadrinsky District of Kurgan Oblast
- Oktyabr, Kursk Oblast, a settlement in Uspensky Selsoviet of Kastorensky District of Kursk Oblast
- Oktyabr, Republic of Mordovia, a village in Novoyamskoy Selsoviet of Yelnikovsky District of the Republic of Mordovia
- Oktyabr, Penza Oblast, a settlement in Shirokoissky Selsoviet of Mokshansky District of Penza Oblast
- Oktyabr, Klepikovsky District, Ryazan Oblast, a settlement in Kolesnikovsky Rural Okrug of Klepikovsky District of Ryazan Oblast
- Oktyabr, Korablinsky District, Ryazan Oblast, a village in Pustotinsky Rural Okrug of Korablinsky District of Ryazan Oblast
- Oktyabr, Stavropol Krai, a khutor in Sergiyevsky Selsoviet of Grachyovsky District of Stavropol Krai
- Oktyabr, Aksubayevsky District, Republic of Tatarstan, a village in Aksubayevsky District, the Republic of Tatarstan
- Oktyabr, Muslyumovsky District, Republic of Tatarstan, a selo in Muslyumovsky District, the Republic of Tatarstan
- Oktyabr, Tver Oblast, a settlement in Bezhetsky District of Tver Oblast
- Oktyabr, Yaroslavl Oblast, a settlement in Oktyabrsky Rural Okrug of Nekouzsky District of Yaroslavl Oblast
