= Alamüdün (river) =

River in northern Kyrgyzstan

Alamüdün Alamedin
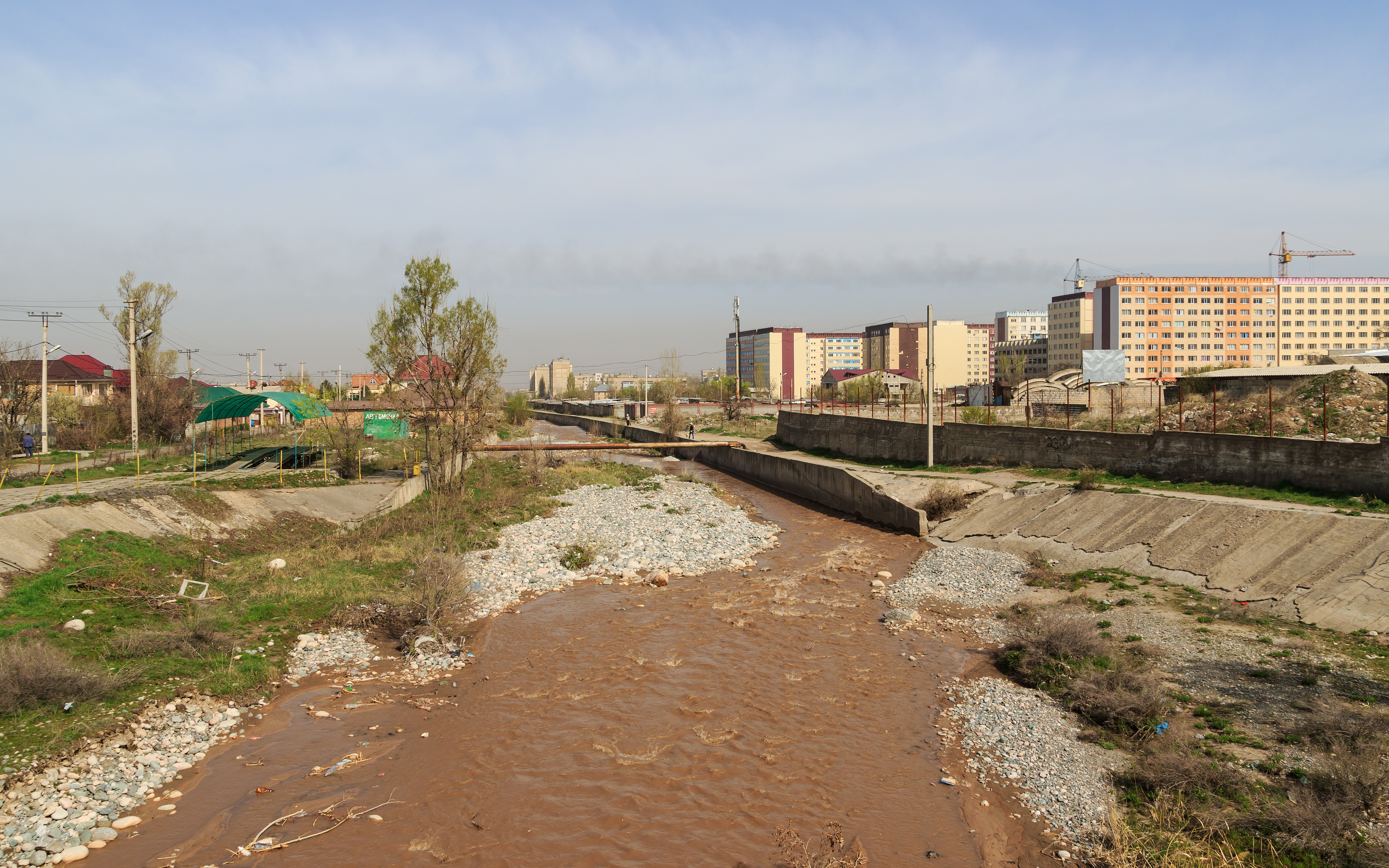
- The Alamüdün in Bishkek
- Native name: Аламүдүн (Kyrgyz); Аламедин (Russian)

Location
- Country: Kyrgyzstan
- City: Bishkek

Physical characteristics
- Source: Alamüdün Glacier
  - location: Northern slope of the Kyrgyz Ala-Too
  - coordinates: 42°25′23″N 74°39′54″E
  - elevation: 3,400 m (11,200 ft)
- Mouth: Chu
  - coordinates: 43°00′58″N 74°40′25″E
  - elevation: 631 m (2,070 ft)
- Length: 78 km (48 mi)
- Basin size: 317 km^{2} (122 sq mi)
- Discharge
  - average: 6.36 m^{3}/s (225 cu ft/s)
  - minimum: 0.74 m^{3}/s (26 cu ft/s)
  - maximum: 300 m^{3}/s (11,000 cu ft/s)

Basin features
- Progression: Chu→ Betpak-Dala desert

The Alamüdün (Kyrgyz: Аламүдүн, IPA: [ɑˌɫɑmʏˈdʏn]), also known as the Alamedin (Russian: Аламедин, IPA: [əɫəmʲɪˈdʲin]), is a river in northern Kyrgyzstan and a left tributary of the Chu. It rises from the Alamüdün Glacier on the northern slope of the Kyrgyz Ala-Too and flows northwards through the Chüy Valley and Bishkek. The river is 78 kilometres (48 mi) long and drains a basin of 317 square kilometres (122 sq mi). Its waters are widely used for irrigation.

== Course ==
The Alamüdün rises from the Alamüdün Glacier on the northern slope of the Kyrgyz Ala-Too. In its upper course, it flows rapidly through a narrow mountain gorge. On emerging into the Chüy Valley, its channel widens and becomes shallower. It then flows northwards through Bishkek before joining the Chu as a left tributary. Its total length is 78 kilometres (48 mi).

The river receives 33 small tributaries, the largest of which is the Chungkurchak, at 19 kilometres (12 mi) long. The villages of Kök-Jar, Tash-Moynok, Besh-Künggöy and Alamüdün lie along its banks.

== Hydrology ==
The Alamüdün has a drainage basin of 317 square kilometres (122 sq mi). Its mean annual discharge is 6.36 cubic metres per second (225 cu ft/s), with a reported maximum of 300 cubic metres per second (11,000 cu ft/s) and a minimum of 0.74 cubic metres per second (26 cu ft/s). Water levels begin to rise in May and recede in September.

The river is fed by glacier and snow melt. At the Alamüdün–Chungkurchak gauging station, 61.3% of annual runoff occurs from June to September.

The 2004 Geography of Kyrgyzstan encyclopedia records 22 small lakes in the basin, with a combined surface area of 0.8 square kilometres (0.31 sq mi), and 53 glaciers covering 74.2 square kilometres (28.6 sq mi).

A study of long-term runoff variability in the Chu basin used a 104-year hydrological record from the Alamüdün gauging station at the confluence with the Chungkurchak.

== Water use ==
The river's waters are widely used for irrigation. A water distribution structure has been built near Kök-Jar, where the river emerges from the Alamüdün Gorge into the Chüy Valley.

== History ==
The Kokand fortress of Pishpek, established in 1825, stood on the left bank of the Alamüdün. During the nineteenth century, Kyrgyz families and Uzbek gardeners and vegetable growers lived along the river.

== Environmental issues and flooding ==
In July 2012, residents of Koy-Tash and Gorny Oryol raised concerns about alleged wastewater discharges into the river from the Teplye Klyuchi sanatorium and a nearby construction site. Residents reported using river water for cooking, and an environmental expert quoted in the report warned of potential health risks.

In July 2015, the river overflowed its banks in Arashan.

In late 2024 and early 2025, emergency and municipal services cleared the Alamüdün channel in Bishkek to prevent winter frazil-ice blockages. In February 2025, environmental inspectors ordered the removal of accumulated waste from the riverbanks. By March, the city administration reported that 11 kilometres (6.8 mi) of the channel had been cleared and bank protection works undertaken as part of measures to prevent flooding.

=== Water quality ===
Kyrgyzhydromet monitors water quality in the Alamüdün at a sampling site 2 km downstream of Bishkek. Published bulletins for 2024–2026 report occasional exceedances of water-quality limits for fisheries. Total iron reached 0.11 mg/L in April 2024, compared with a limit of 0.10 mg/L, while five-day biochemical oxygen demand (BOD₅) reached 5.53 mg O₂/L in December 2025, compared with a limit of 3 mg O₂/L. Published ammonium nitrogen and nitrate nitrogen concentrations remained below their respective limits.

The published record contains gaps, and the range of indicators reported varies between months. These observations document intermittent exceedances but are insufficient to establish a sustained deterioration in water quality.
