= Igenchelyar =

Igenchelyar Игенчеляр
- Village
- Location within Bashkortostan Location within Russia
- Coordinates: 55°30′N 58°34′E
- Country: Russia
- Region: Bashkortostan
- District: Kiginsky District
- Time zone: UTC+5:00

Igenchelyar (Russian: Игенчеляр; Bashkir: Игенселәр, İgenselär) is a rural locality (a village) in Nizhnekiginsky Selsoviet, Kiginsky District, Bashkortostan, Russia. The population was 58 as of 2010. There is 1 street.

== Geography ==
Igenchelyar is located 26 km north of Verkhniye Kigi (the district's administrative centre) by road. Urak is the nearest rural locality.
