= Tuguzly =

Tuguzly Тугузлы
- Village
- Location within Bashkortostan Location within Russia
- Coordinates: 55°19′N 58°45′E
- Country: Russia
- Region: Bashkortostan
- District: Kiginsky District
- Time zone: UTC+5:00

Tuguzly (Russian: Тугузлы; Bashkir: Туғыҙлы, Tuğıźlı) is a rural locality (a village) in Arslanovsky Selsoviet, Kiginsky District, Bashkortostan, Russia. The population was 507 as of 2010. There are 6 streets.

== Geography ==
Tuguzly is located 19 km southeast of Verkhniye Kigi (the district's administrative centre) by road. Tyoply Klyuch is the nearest rural locality.
