= Abdrezyakovo =

Abdrezyakovo Абдрезяково Әбдрәзәк Äbdräzäk
- Village
- Location within Bashkortostan Location within Russia
- Coordinates: 55°23′N 59°01′E
- Country: Russia
- Region: Bashkortostan
- District: Kiginsky District
- Time zone: [[UTC+5:00]]

Abdrezyakovo (Russian: Абдрезяково; Bashkir: Әбдрәзәк, Äbdräzäk) is a rural locality (a village) in Arslanovsky Selsoviet of Kiginsky District, Bashkortostan, Russia. The population was 23 as of 2010. There is 1 street.

== Geography ==
Abdrezyakovo is located 42 km east of Verkhniye Kigi (the district's administrative centre) by road. Syurbayevo is the nearest rural locality.

== Ethnicity ==
The village is inhabited by Bashkirs.
