= Yunusovo =

Yunusovo Юнусово
- Village
- Location within Bashkortostan Location within Russia
- Coordinates: 55°21′N 58°36′E
- Country: Russia
- Region: Bashkortostan
- District: Kiginsky District
- Time zone: UTC+5:00

Yunusovo (Russian: Юнусово; Bashkir: Юныс, Yunıs) is a rural locality (a village) in Verkhnekiginsky Selsoviet, Kiginsky District, Bashkortostan, Russia. The population was 161 as of 2010. There is 1 street.

== Geography ==
Yunusovo is located 7 km south of Verkhniye Kigi (the district's administrative centre) by road. Verkhniye Kigi is the nearest rural locality.
