= Urak, Republic of Bashkortostan =

Urak Урак
- Village
- Location within Bashkortostan Location within Russia
- Coordinates: 55°31′N 58°32′E
- Country: Russia
- Region: Bashkortostan
- District: Kiginsky District
- Time zone: UTC+5:00

Urak (Russian: Урак; Bashkir: Ураҡ, Uraq) is a rural locality (a village) in Nizhnekiginsky Selsoviet, Kiginsky District, Bashkortostan, Russia. The population was 37 as of 2010. There is 1 street.

== Geography ==
Urak is located 23 km north of Verkhniye Kigi (the district's administrative centre) by road. Nizhniye Kigi is the nearest rural locality.
