= Kandakovka, Kiginsky District, Republic of Bashkortostan =

Kandakovka Кандаковка
- Selo
- Location within Bashkortostan Location within Russia
- Coordinates: 55°35′N 58°28′E
- Country: Russia
- Region: Bashkortostan
- District: Kiginsky District
- Time zone: UTC+5:00

Kandakovka (Russian: Кандаковка) is a rural locality (a selo) and the administrative centre of Kandakovsky Selsoviet, Kiginsky District, Bashkortostan, Russia. The population was 347 as of 2010. There are 3 streets.

== Geography ==
Kandakovka is located 27 km north by road of Verkhniye Kigi, the district's administrative centre. Sultanovka is the nearest rural locality.
