= Pervomaysky, Kiginsky District, Republic of Bashkortostan =

Pervomaysky Первомайский
- Village
- Location within Bashkortostan Location within Russia
- Coordinates: 55°34′N 58°29′E
- Country: Russia
- Region: Bashkortostan
- District: Kiginsky District
- Time zone: UTC+5:00

Pervomaysky (Russian: Первомайский) is a rural locality (a village) in Kandakovsky Selsoviet, Kiginsky District, Bashkortostan, Russia. The population was 109 as of 2010. There is 1 street.

== Geography ==
Pervomaysky is located 28 km north of Verkhniye Kigi (the district's administrative centre) by road. Sultanovka is the nearest rural locality.
