= Syurbayevo =

Syurbayevo Сюрбаево
- Village
- Location within Bashkortostan Location within Russia
- Coordinates: 55°25′N 59°04′E
- Country: Russia
- Region: Bashkortostan
- District: Kiginsky District
- Time zone: UTC+5:00

Syurbayevo (Russian: Сюрбаево; Bashkir: Сирбай, Sirbay) is a rural locality (a village) in Arslanovsky Selsoviet, Kiginsky District, Bashkortostan, Russia. The population was 217 as of 2010. There are 4 streets.

== Geography ==
Syurbayevo is located 47 km east of Verkhniye Kigi (the district's administrative centre) by road. Abdrezyakovo is the nearest rural locality.
