= Yelanlino =

Yelanlino Еланлино
- Selo
- Location within Bashkortostan Location within Russia
- Coordinates: 55°13′N 58°36′E
- Country: Russia
- Region: Bashkortostan
- District: Kiginsky District
- Time zone: UTC+5:00

Yelanlino (Russian: Еланлино; Bashkir: Йыланлы, Yılanlı) is a rural locality (a selo) and the administrative centre of Yelanlinsky Selsoviet, Kiginsky District, Bashkortostan, Russia. The population was 796 as of 2010. There are 11 streets.

== Geography ==
Yelanlino is located 32 km south of Verkhniye Kigi (the district's administrative centre) by road. Lakly is the nearest rural locality.
