= Abzaevo, Kiginsky District, Bashkortostan =

Abzaevo Абзаево Абзай
- Selo
- Location within Bashkortostan Location within Russia
- Coordinates: 55°35′N 58°41′E
- Country: Russia
- Region: Bashkortostan
- District: Kiginsky District
- Time zone: [[UTC+5:00]]

Abzaevo (Russian: Абзаево, Bashkir: Абзай, Abzay) is a rural locality (a selo) and the administrative centre of Abzaevsky Selsoviet, Kiginsky District, Bashkortostan, Russia. The population was 558 as of 2010. There are 6 streets.

== Geography ==
Abzaevo is located 34 km north of Verkhniye Kigi (the district's administrative centre) by road. Masyakovo is the nearest rural locality.

== Ethnicity ==
The village is inhabited by Bashkirs and others.
