= Kiseik =

Kiseik Кисеик
- Village
- Location within Bashkortostan Location within Russia
- Coordinates: 55°29′N 58°49′E
- Country: Russia
- Region: Bashkortostan
- District: Kiginsky District
- Time zone: UTC+5:00

Kiseik (Russian: Кисеик; Bashkir: Кесейек, Keseyek) is a rural locality (a village) in Leuzinsky Selsoviet, Kiginsky District, Bashkortostan, Russia. The population was 2 as of 2010.

== Geography ==
Kiseik is located 19 km northeast of Verkhniye Kigi (the district's administrative centre) by road. Leuza is the nearest rural locality.
