= Staromukhametovo =

Staromukhametovo Старомухаметово
- Village
- Location within Bashkortostan Location within Russia
- Coordinates: 55°16′N 58°28′E
- Country: Russia
- Region: Bashkortostan
- District: Kiginsky District
- Time zone: UTC+5:00

Staromukhametovo (Russian: Старомухаметово; Bashkir: Иҫке Мөхәмәт, İśke Möxämät) is a rural locality (a village) in Ibrayevsky Selsoviet, Kiginsky District, Bashkortostan, Russia. The population was 460 as of 2010. There are 7 streets.

== Geography ==
Staromukhametovo is located 21 km southwest of Verkhniye Kigi (the district's administrative centre) by road. Yagunovo is the nearest rural locality.
