= Nizhniye Kigi =

Nizhniye Kigi Нижние Киги
- Selo
- Location within Bashkortostan Location within Russia
- Coordinates: 55°32′N 58°29′E
- Country: Russia
- Region: Bashkortostan
- District: Kiginsky District
- Time zone: UTC+5:00

Nizhniye Kigi (Russian: Ни́жние Киги́; Bashkir: Түбәнге Ҡыйғы, Tübänge Qıyğı) is a rural locality (a selo) and the administrative centre of Nizhnekiginsky Selsoviet, Kiginsky District, Bashkortostan, Russia. The population was 1,380 as of 2010. There are 20 streets.

== Geography ==
Nizhniye Kigi is located 20 km north of Verkhniye Kigi (the district's administrative centre) by road. Urak is the nearest rural locality.
