= Vyazovka, Kiginsky District, Republic of Bashkortostan =

Vyazovka Вязовка
- Village
- Location within Bashkortostan Location within Russia
- Coordinates: 55°24′N 58°55′E
- Country: Russia
- Region: Bashkortostan
- District: Kiginsky District
- Time zone: UTC+5:00

Vyazovka (Russian: Вязовка) is a rural locality (a village) in Leuzinsky Selsoviet, Kiginsky District, Bashkortostan, Russia. The population was 17 as of 2010. There is 1 street.

== Geography ==
Vyazovka is located 25 km east of Verkhniye Kigi (the district's administrative centre) by road. Leuza is the nearest rural locality.
