= Sultanovka, Kiginsky District, Republic of Bashkortostan =

Sultanovka Султановка
- Village
- Location within Bashkortostan Location within Russia
- Coordinates: 55°34′N 58°28′E
- Country: Russia
- Region: Bashkortostan
- District: Kiginsky District
- Time zone: UTC+5:00

Sultanovka (Russian: Султановка; Bashkir: Солтан, Soltan) is a rural locality (a village) in Kandakovsky Selsoviet, Kiginsky District, Bashkortostan, Russia. The population was 242 as of 2010. There is 1 street.

== Geography ==
Sultanovka is located 24 km northwest of Verkhniye Kigi (the district's administrative centre) by road. Kandakovka is the nearest rural locality.
