= Ibrayevo, Kiginsky District, Republic of Bashkortostan =

Ibrayevo Ибраево
- Selo
- Location within Bashkortostan Location within Russia
- Coordinates: 55°19′N 58°27′E
- Country: Russia
- Region: Bashkortostan
- District: Kiginsky District
- Time zone: UTC+5:00

Ibrayevo (Russian: Ибраево; Bashkir: Ибрай, İbray) is a rural locality (a selo) and the administrative centre of Ibrayevsky Selsoviet, Kiginsky District, Bashkortostan, Russia. The population was 471 as of 2010. There are 6 streets.

== Geography ==
Ibrayevo is located 14 km southwest of Verkhniye Kigi (the district's administrative centre) by road. Yukalikulevo is the nearest rural locality.
