= Asylguzhino =

Asylguzhino Асылгужино
- Village
- Location within Bashkortostan Location within Russia
- Coordinates: 55°18′N 59°05′E
- Country: Russia
- Region: Bashkortostan
- District: Kiginsky District
- Time zone: UTC+5:00

Asylguzhino (Russian: Асылгужино; Bashkir: Аҫылғужа, Aśığulja) is a rural locality (a village) in Arslanovsky Selsoviet, Kiginsky District, Bashkortostan, Russia. The population was 223 as of 2010. There are 3 streets.

== Geography ==
Asylguzhino is located 43 km southeast of Verkhniye Kigi (the district's administrative centre) by road. Postroyki is the nearest rural locality.
