= Leuza =

Leuza Леуза
- Selo
- Location within Bashkortostan Location within Russia
- Coordinates: 55°26′N 58°48′E
- Country: Russia
- Region: Bashkortostan
- District: Kiginsky District
- Time zone: UTC+5:00

Leuza (Russian: Леуза́; Bashkir: Ләүйылға, Läwyılğa) is a rural locality (a selo) and the administrative centre of Leuzinsky Selsoviet, Kiginsky District, Bashkortostan, Russia. The population was 1,076 as of 2010. There are 11 streets.

== Geography ==
Leuza is located 17 km northeast of Verkhniye Kigi (the district's administrative centre) by road. Verkhniye Kigi is the nearest rural locality.
