= Tukayevo, Kiginsky District, Republic of Bashkortostan =

Tukayevo Тукаево
- Village
- Location within Bashkortostan Location within Russia
- Coordinates: 55°28′N 58°31′E
- Country: Russia
- Region: Bashkortostan
- District: Kiginsky District
- Time zone: UTC+5:00

Tukayevo (Russian: Тукаево; Bashkir: Туҡай, Tuqay) is a rural locality (a village) in Dushanbekovsky Selsoviet, Kiginsky District, Bashkortostan, Russia. The population was 183 as of 2010. There are 2 streets.

== Geography ==
Tukayevo is located 13 km northwest of Verkhniye Kigi (the district's administrative centre) by road. Saragulovo is the nearest rural locality.
