= Saragulovo =

Saragulovo Сарагулово
- Village
- Location within Bashkortostan Location within Russia
- Coordinates: 55°29′N 58°31′E
- Country: Russia
- Region: Bashkortostan
- District: Kiginsky District
- Time zone: UTC+5:00

Saragulovo (Russian: Сарагулово; Bashkir: Һарығул, Harığul) is a rural locality (a village) in Dushanbekovsky Selsoviet, Kiginsky District, Bashkortostan, Russia. The population was 86 as of 2010. There are 2 streets.

== Geography ==
Saragulovo is located 15 km north of Verkhniye Kigi (the district's administrative centre) by road. Tukayevo is the nearest rural locality.
