= Dushanbekovo =

Dushanbekovo Душанбеково
- Selo
- Location within Bashkortostan Location within Russia
- Coordinates: 55°26′N 58°29′E
- Country: Russia
- Region: Bashkortostan
- District: Kiginsky District
- Time zone: UTC+5:00

Dushanbekovo (Russian: Душанбеково; Bashkir: Дүшәмбикә, Düşämbikä) is a rural locality (a selo) and the administrative centre of Dushanbekovsky Selsoviet, Kiginsky District, Bashkortostan, Russia. The population was 622 as of 2010. There are 6 streets.

== Geography ==
Dushanbekovo is located 11 km northwest of Verkhniye Kigi (the district's administrative centre) by road. Tukayevo is the nearest rural locality.
