= Kizetamak =

Kizetamak Кизетамак
- Village
- Location within Bashkortostan Location within Russia
- Coordinates: 55°26′N 58°35′E
- Country: Russia
- Region: Bashkortostan
- District: Kiginsky District
- Time zone: UTC+5:00

Kizetamak (Russian: Кизетамак; Bashkir: Кеҙетамаҡ, Keźetamaq) is a rural locality (a village) in Verkhnekiginsky Selsoviet, Kiginsky District, Bashkortostan, Russia. The population was 122 as of 2010. There is 1 street.

== Geography ==
Kizetamak is located 4 km north of Verkhniye Kigi (the district's administrative centre) by road. Verkhniye Kigi is the nearest rural locality.
