= Yukalikulevo, Kiginsky District, Republic of Bashkortostan =

Yukalikulevo Юкаликулево
- Village
- Location within Bashkortostan Location within Russia
- Coordinates: 55°19′N 58°22′E
- Country: Russia
- Region: Bashkortostan
- District: Kiginsky District
- Time zone: UTC+5:00

Yukalikulevo (Russian: Юкаликулево; Bashkir: Йүкәлекүл, Yükälekül) is a rural locality (a village) in Ibrayevsky Selsoviet, Kiginsky District, Bashkortostan, Russia. The population was 648 as of 2010. There are 8 streets.

== Geography ==
Yukalikulevo is located 20 km southwest of Verkhniye Kigi (the district's administrative centre) by road. Yelgildino is the nearest rural locality.
