= Alaguzovo =

Alaguzovo Алагузово
- Village
- Location within Bashkortostan Location within Russia
- Coordinates: 55°35′N 58°46′E
- Country: Russia
- Region: Bashkortostan
- District: Kiginsky District
- Time zone: UTC+5:00

Alaguzovo (Russian: Алагузово; Bashkir: Алағуз, Alağuz) is a rural locality (a village) in Abzaevsky Selsoviet, Kiginsky District, Bashkortostan, Russia. The population was 554 as of 2010. There are 4 streets.

== Geography ==
Alaguzovo is located 8 km east of Verkhniye Kigi (the district's administrative centre) by road. Leuza is the nearest rural locality.
