= Kurgashevo =

Kurgashevo Кургашево
- Village
- Location within Bashkortostan Location within Russia
- Coordinates: 55°22′N 58°45′E
- Country: Russia
- Region: Bashkortostan
- District: Kiginsky District
- Time zone: UTC+5:00

Kurgashevo (Russian: Кургашево; Bashkir: Ҡурғаш, Qurğaş) is a rural locality (a village) in Leuzinsky Selsoviet, Kiginsky District, Bashkortostan, Russia. The population was 279 as of 2010. There are 4 streets.

== Geography ==
Kurgashevo is located 14 km southeast of Verkhniye Kigi (the district's administrative centre) by road. Tuguzly is the nearest rural locality.
