= Yusupovo, Kiginsky District, Republic of Bashkortostan =

Yusupovo Юсупово
- Village
- Location within Bashkortostan Location within Russia
- Coordinates: 55°37′N 58°26′E
- Country: Russia
- Region: Bashkortostan
- District: Kiginsky District
- Time zone: UTC+5:00

Yusupovo (Russian: Юсупово; Bashkir: Йосоп, Yosop) is a rural locality (a village) in Kandakovsky Selsoviet, Kiginsky District, Bashkortostan, Russia. The population was 529 as of 2010. There are 6 streets.

== Geography ==
Yusupovo is located 31 km north of Verkhniye Kigi (the district's administrative centre) by road. Kandakovka is the nearest rural locality.
