= Sagirovo =

Sagirovo Сагирово
- Village
- Location within Bashkortostan Location within Russia
- Coordinates: 55°27′N 58°35′E
- Country: Russia
- Region: Bashkortostan
- District: Kiginsky District
- Time zone: UTC+5:00

Sagirovo (Russian: Сагирово; Bashkir: Сағыр, Sağır) is a rural locality (a village) in Dushanbekovsky Selsoviet, Kiginsky District, Bashkortostan, Russia. The population was 277 as of 2010. There are 3 streets.

== Geography ==
Sagirovo is located 7 km north of Verkhniye Kigi (the district's administrative centre) by road. Kizetamak is the nearest rural locality.
