= Kulmetovo =

Kulmetovo Кульметово
- Village
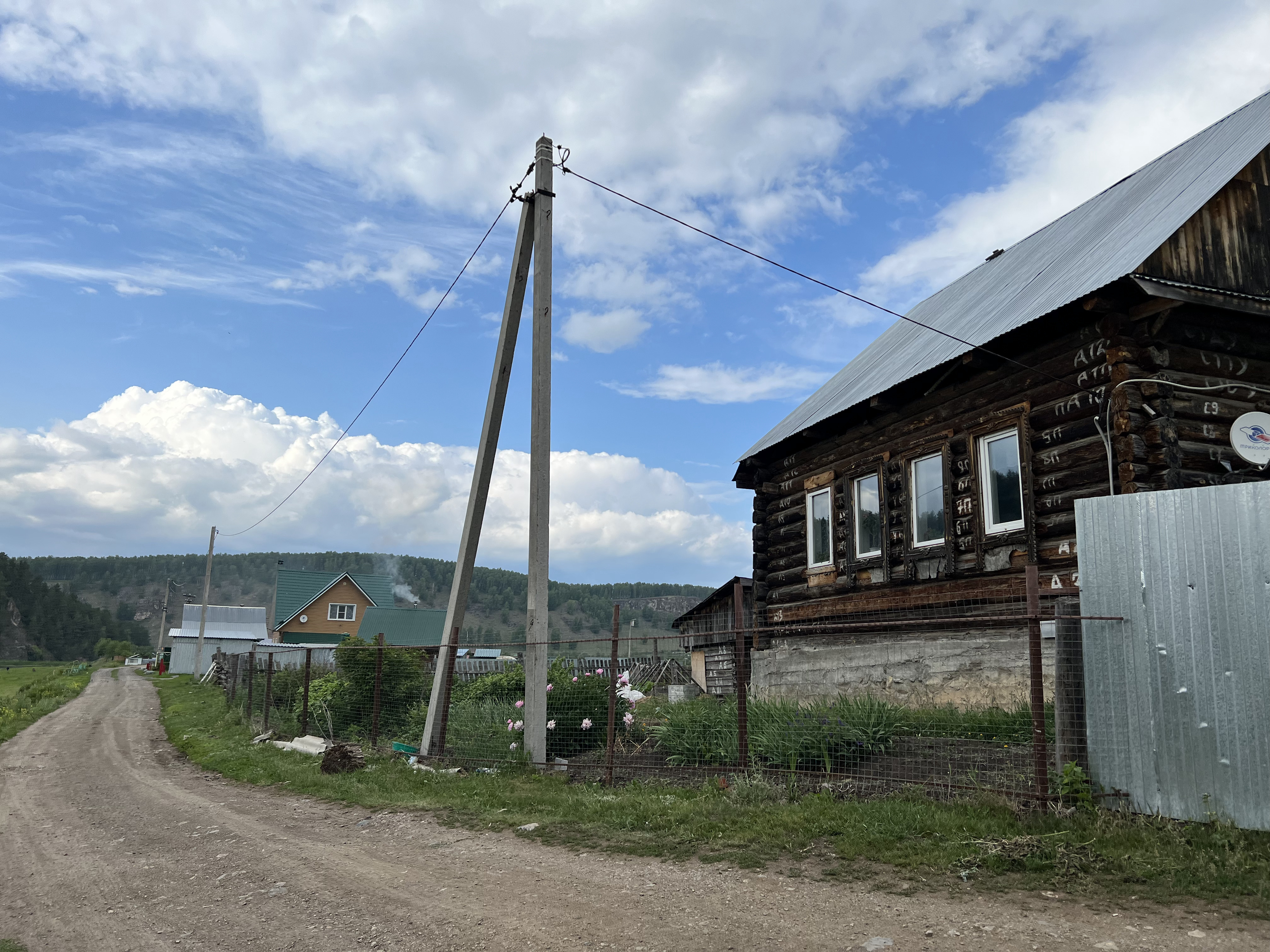
- View of Ayskaya Street in Kulmetovo

- Location within Bashkortostan Location within Russia
- Coordinates: 55°10′N 58°42′E
- Country: Russia
- Region: Bashkortostan
- District: Kiginsky District
- Time zone: UTC+5:00

Kulmetovo (Russian: Кульметово; Bashkir: Ҡолмәт, Qolmät) is a rural locality (a village) in Yelanlinsky Selsoviet, Kiginsky District, Bashkortostan, Russia. The population was 293 as of 2010. There are 5 streets.

== Geography ==
Kulmetovo is located 41 km south of Verkhniye Kigi (the district's administrative centre) by road. Alexeyevka is the nearest rural locality.
