= Idrisovo, Kiginsky District, Republic of Bashkortostan =

Idrisovo Идрисово
- Village
- Location within Bashkortostan Location within Russia
- Coordinates: 55°22′N 58°51′E
- Country: Russia
- Region: Bashkortostan
- District: Kiginsky District
- Time zone: UTC+5:00

Idrisovo (Russian: Идрисово; Bashkir: Иҙрис, İźris) is a rural locality (a village) in Arslanovsky Selsoviet, Kiginsky District, Bashkortostan, Russia. The population was 197 as of 2010. There are two streets.

== Geography ==
Idrisovo is located 31 km east of Verkhniye Kigi (the district's administrative centre) by road. Tuguzly is the nearest rural locality.
