= Masyakovo =

Masyakovo Масяково
- Village
- Location within Bashkortostan Location within Russia
- Coordinates: 55°35′N 58°36′E
- Country: Russia
- Region: Bashkortostan
- District: Kiginsky District
- Time zone: UTC+5:00

Masyakovo (Russian: Масяково; Bashkir: Мәсәк, Mäsäk) is a rural locality (a village) in Abzaevsky Selsoviet, Kiginsky District, Bashkortostan, Russia. The population was 225 as of 2010. There is 1 street.

== Geography ==
Masyakovo is located 32 km north of Verkhniye Kigi (the district's administrative centre) by road. Abzayevo is the nearest rural locality.
