= Kulbakovo =

Kulbakovo Кулбаково
- Village
- Location within Bashkortostan Location within Russia
- Coordinates: 55°20′N 59°08′E
- Country: Russia
- Region: Bashkortostan
- District: Kiginsky District
- Time zone: UTC+5:00

Kulbakovo (Russian: Кулбаково; Bashkir: Ҡолбаҡ, Qolbaq) is a rural locality (a village) in Arslanovsky Selsoviet, Kiginsky District, Bashkortostan, Russia. The population was 322 as of 2010. There are 4 streets.

== Geography ==
Kulbakovo is located 46 km southeast of Verkhniye Kigi (the district's administrative centre) by road. Asylguzhino is the nearest rural locality.
