= Vakiyarovo =

Vakiyarovo Вакиярово
- Village
- Location within Bashkortostan Location within Russia
- Coordinates: 55°16′N 58°39′E
- Country: Russia
- Region: Bashkortostan
- District: Kiginsky District
- Time zone: UTC+5:00

Vakiyarovo (Russian: Вакиярово; Bashkir: Вәҡийәр, Wäqiyär) is a rural locality (a village) in Yelanlinsky Selsoviet, Kiginsky District, Bashkortostan, Russia. The population was 445 as of 2010. There are 6 streets.

== Geography ==
Vakiyarovo is located 23 km south of Verkhniye Kigi (the district's administrative centre) by road. Yelanlino is the nearest rural locality.
