= Novomukhametovo =

Novomukhametovo Новомухаметово
- Village
- Location within Bashkortostan Location within Russia
- Coordinates: 55°20′N 58°18′E
- Country: Russia
- Region: Bashkortostan
- District: Kiginsky District
- Time zone: UTC+5:00

Novomukhametovo (Russian: Новомухаметово; Bashkir: Яңы Мөхәмәт, Yañı Möxämät) is a rural locality (a village) in Ibrayevsky Selsoviet, Kiginsky District, Bashkortostan, Russia. The population was 3 as of 2010.

== Geography ==
Novomukhametovo is located 25 km southwest of Verkhniye Kigi (the district's administrative centre) by road. Yukalikulevo is the nearest rural locality.
