= Ağçay =

Ağçay or Agchay may refer to:

- Ağçay, Khachmaz, Azerbaijan
- Ağçay, Qakh, Azerbaijan
- Sedat Ağçay, Turkish footballer
