= Oktyabr, Kiginsky District, Republic of Bashkortostan =

Oktyabr Октябрь
- Village
- Location within Bashkortostan Location within Russia
- Coordinates: 55°30′N 58°36′E
- Country: Russia
- Region: Bashkortostan
- District: Kiginsky District
- Time zone: UTC+5:00

Oktyabr (Russian: Октябрь) is a rural locality (a village) in Nizhnekiginsky Selsoviet, Kiginsky District, Bashkortostan, Russia. The population was 40 as of 2010. There is 1 street.

== Geography ==
Oktyabr is located 28 km north of Verkhniye Kigi (the district's administrative centre) by road. Igenchelyar is the nearest rural locality.
