= Zarechnoye, Kyrgyzstan =

Village in Chüy Region, Kyrgyzstan

Zarechnoye Kyrgyz: Заречное
- Village
- Location within Kyrgyzstan
- Coordinates: 42°45′23″N 74°34′33″E
- Country: Kyrgyzstan
- Region: Chüy Region
- District: Alamüdün District
- Rural community: Arashan
- Founded: 1938

Population (2022)
  - Total: 1,222
- Time zone: UTC+6

Zarechnoye (Kyrgyz: Заречное) is a village in Alamüdün District of Chüy Region, Kyrgyzstan. It is part of the Arashan rural community (ayyl aymak). Founded in 1938, the village had a population of 1,222 in 2022.

The village is listed in the 2025 state administrative-territorial classifier under SOATE code 41708 203 809 02 0.

== History ==
Zarechnoye was founded in 1938.

== Geography ==
Zarechnoye is situated south of Bishkek, in the valley of the Ala-Archa River, near the northern foothills of the Kyrgyz Ala-Too Range. The village is located along the Alamüdün–Arashan–Koy-Tash road.

A new bridge over the Ala-Archa River in Zarechnoye was opened to traffic in October 2024, replacing an earlier bridge that had become unusable. The bridge is 23 m long and 13 m wide.

== Population ==
According to the 2004 geographical encyclopedia of Kyrgyzstan, Zarechnoye had 565 inhabitants in 2002. Its population was 541 at the 2009 census and increased to 1,222 at the 2022 census.

Historical population
Year	Pop.	±% p.a.
2002	565	—
2009	541	−0.62%
2022	1,222	+6.47%
Sources: Geography of Kyrgyzstan (2004); 2009 and 2022 population censuses.
