= Salers (disambiguation) =

Salers is a commune of the Cantal département in France.

Salers may also refer to:

- Salers (cattle)
- Salers cheese

== See also ==
- Saler, a village in the Shamkir Rayon of Azerbaijan
