= Viktor Selikhov =

Soviet serial killer (1935–1965)

- Виктор Михайлович Селихов
- Born: 1935; Frunze, Kirghiz SSR (present-day Bishkek, Kyrgyzstan)
- Died: 1965 (aged 29–30); Kirghiz SSR
- Cause of death: Execution by shooting
- Other names: "The Naked Demon" "The Demon with a wreath"
- Convictions: Murder x3 Rape x10 Attempted rape x17
- Penalty: Death

Details
- Victims: 3+
- Span of crimes: 1962–1964
- Country: Soviet Union
- State: Chuy
- Date apprehended: 1964

Viktor Mikhailovich Selikhov (Russian: Виктор Михайлович Селихов; 1935 – 1965), known as The Naked Demon, was a Soviet serial killer and rapist who, between 1962 and 1964, attacked numerous young girls and women in the Kirghiz SSR's Chuy Region, raping at least 10 and killing 3 of his victims. Noted for his peculiar appearance while committing the crimes (barefoot, shirtless and wearing a wreath on his head), he was arrested, convicted and subsequently executed in 1965.

== Biography ==
Little is known about Selikhov's upbringing. Born in the Kirghiz SSR's capital, he lived in a small house on the outskirts and was described as a polite young man by his neighbors, who never drank or engaged in hooliganistic activities, and was a decent accordion player. He worked at a local factory, the 8th Motor Depot, where he was considered amiable by colleagues.

At one point, he fell in love with his roommate, Tonya, to whom he would eventually propose, but she rebuffed his advances and married another man. Angered, Selikhov began writing and sending her numerous letters, in which he continuously tried to convince her to marry him. After Tonya eventually divorced her husband, with whom she had had a son, Selikhov approached her yet again, offering to marry her and to even take care of her son. However, he was rejected yet again, leaving him even more embittered than before. Not long after, a mysterious wave of rapes and murders swept the localities around Frunze.

== Crime spree ==
Selikhov's first recorded crimes occurred in 1962, when he began raping young girls in the forest park of Alamüdün. In what he would describe as "an attempt to shock his victims" he would always attack without any shoes or shirt on, wearing a wreath around his head.

In November 1963, two women were attacked, but their assailant was thwarted by a group of passers-by. The crime wasn't reported to the police, and was initially considered an act of hooliganism. The following month, the naked body of a young teacher named M. Kulakovoy was found in a forest outside the village of Prigorodnoye. She had been raped, blindfolded and subsequently killed with a blunt object. On April 7, 1964, in the village of Leninsky, another young woman was brutally abused in this same way, but survived her injuries. This was followed up by another attack on May 8, when the offender attacked a young saleswoman outside her store in Alamüdün.

Just three days after the Alamüdün attack, the corpse of another young woman was found near Karagachevoy Grove outside Frunze. Her skirt had been torn, she had been raped and, like with the previous murder victim, killed by being hit on the head with a blunt object. While examining the crime scene, a blood-splattered white shoe was found, as well as drag marks on the nearby grass, indicating that the victim had been killed elsewhere. The local Department of Internal Affairs, which was assigned to handle the case, quickly established the identity of the victim as that of 20-year-old Elena Rambakh, a seamstress who worked at a nearby factory. According to her neighbors, she was last seen near the Tubbolnitsa bus stop. While questioning her parents, the investigators learned that the killer had stolen a gold watch with a bracelet from the victim. The officers also learned that her parents were Baptists who kept their religious activities secret, due to the USSR's state-mandated atheism. After learning that another victim had associations with the religious group, they launched a seven-month-long investigation complete with a show trial, believing that sectarians were attacking young girls due to the victims going against their beliefs.

In an attempt to catch the murderer, the policemen examined all reported cases of rape and checked every registered sex offender in the area, but to no avail. Even with the surviving victims' testimonies to help develop an identikit, it proved to be futile, as he attacked them from behind and they were unable to give an accurate, consistent description. At one point, it was even suggested that the perpetrator might have necrophilic tendencies, but this theory was thrown out of the window when all the local psychiatric wards confirmed that their patients were kept under watch. Security around the capital was tightened, but this also led to the spread of rumors of a maniac roaming the area: as a result, women refused to work night shifts or walk home alone at night, and several enterprises from the city sent a letter to the Communist Party of Kirghizia, urging them to catch the elusive "demon". In response, the police chief in charge of the investigation, I. Skorin, was pressured to allocate all resources to solving the case, with Skorin using all of his manpower and 300 druzhinniks to help with the capture, but to no avail. On June 1, Selikhov struck again, attacking nurse Rimma Pryadkina near a brick factory late at night. However, he was discovered while undressing the victim, and subsequently fled.

In a desperate attempt to capture their murderer, operatives of both sexes were disguised as couples and patrolled the parks around Frunze and Alamüdün. When it became clear that the offender was aware of their plan, since no attacks had taken place, the plan was dropped. On June 15, the final attack was reported: a young married couple had been attacked just outside Leninsky. Both of them had been hit from behind with a blunt object, with the husband, Yuri Perepyolkin, surviving, but his wife was dragged away, raped and then strangled in a nearby field. After killing Mrs. Perepyolkin, her killer stole two watches. Not long after, the killer tried to strike again, attacking a trio of druzhinniks, knocking out one of the men, but was warded off by the second, Nikolai Romanenko. While fleeing, the "demon" dropped his axe, which would later be used to track him down.

== Capture, sentence and execution ==
After getting a hold of the axe, the investigators showed the weapon to the local villagers, with one of them recognizing it as Selikhov's. However, Selikhov claimed that he had given it to some relatives, who needed it for construction work at their house. Upon closer inspection, it was revealed that the interviewed villager's nephew, Viktor Selikhov, often left the village at night without telling anyone where he went. Operatives were dispatched to arrest him, but Selikhov slipped away before he could get caught. While searching through his home, authorities found eight women's watches, as well as numerous women's clothing and accessories which belonged to the elusive killer's victims. A few days after his identification, he was arrested at a local market, where he was examining some of the new axes that had just arrived.

During his interrogation, Selikhov confessed almost immediately to all of the crimes. During the subsequent psychiatric evaluation, Selikhov was recognized as sane, and put on trial on charges of 3 murders, 10 rapes and 17 attempted rapes. He was convicted on all counts and sentenced to death, an after an unsuccessful appeal, he was executed the following year.

== See also ==
- List of serial killers by country
- List of serial rapists
