= Arslanovo, Kiginsky District, Republic of Bashkortostan =

Arslanovo Арсланово
- Selo
- Location within Bashkortostan Location within Russia
- Coordinates: 55°21′N 58°59′E
- Country: Russia
- Region: Bashkortostan
- District: Kiginsky District
- Time zone: UTC+5:00

Arslanovo (Russian: Арсланово; Bashkir: Арыҫлан, Arıślan) is a rural locality (a selo) and the administrative centre of Arslanovsky Selsoviet, Kiginsky District, Bashkortostan, Russia. The population was 719 as of 2010. There are 6 streets.

== Geography ==
Arslanovo is located 36 km southeast of Verkhniye Kigi (the district's administrative centre) by road. Asylguzhino is the nearest rural locality.
