= Gornaya Mayevka =

Village in Chüy Region, Kyrgyzstan

Gornaya Mayevka Горная Маевка
- Village
- Location within Kyrgyzstan
- Coordinates: 42°42′32″N 74°44′50″E
- Country: Kyrgyzstan
- Region: Chüy Region
- District: Alamüdün District
- Rural community: Tash-Moynok

Population (2022)
  - Total: 894
- Time zone: UTC+6

Gornaya Mayevka (Kyrgyz: Горная Маевка; Russian: Горная Маёвка) is a village in Alamüdün District, Chüy Region, Kyrgyzstan, and forms part of the Tash-Moynok rural community. According to the 2022 census, it had a population of 894.
