= Baytik =

Baytik Байтик
- Location within Kyrgyzstan
- Coordinates: 42°44′12″N 74°32′54″E
- Country: Kyrgyzstan
- Region: Chüy Region
- District: Alamüdün District
- Established: 1850
- Elevation: 1,185 m (3,888 ft)

Population (2021)
  - Total: 3,236

Baytik (known as Orto Alysh before 1991) is a village in the Alamüdün District of Chüy Region, Kyrgyzstan. Its population was 3,236 in 2021. It is named after Baytik Kanaev, one of the leaders of the Solto tribe who fought the Kokand Khanate. Baytik was established in 1850.
