= Asankhan Dzhumakhmatov =

Asankhan Dzhumakhmatov Асанкан Жумакматов
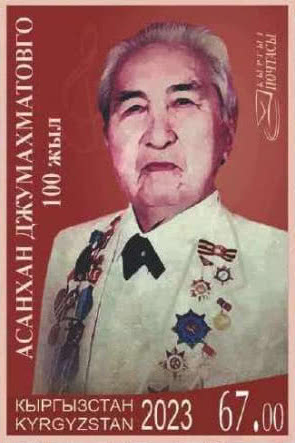
- Dzhumakhmatov on a 2023 stamp

Background information
- Born: June 16, 1923; Arashan, Russian Empire (present-day Kyrgyzstan)
- Died: June 21, 2008 (aged 85); Bishkek, Kyrgyzstan
- Genres: Classical
- Occupation(s): Composer, conductor
- Instrument: Percussion

Asankhan Dzhumakhmatov (Note: Kyrgyz: Асанкан Жумакматов, romanized: Asankan Zhumakmatov; Russian: Асанхан Джумахматович Джумахматов, romanized: Asankhan Dzhumakhmatovich Dzhumakhmatov) (16 June 1923 – 21 June 2008) was a Soviet and Kyrgyzstani composer and conductor of the Soviet era, born in Arashan. A member of the Communist Party of the Soviet Union since 1944, he was named a People's Artist of the USSR in 1976. He graduated from the Moscow Conservatory in 1958, and held various posts in the Kirghiz SSR. He also received the Toktogul State Prize of the Kirghiz SSR in 1972.
