= Lebedinovka =

Lebedinovka Лебединовка
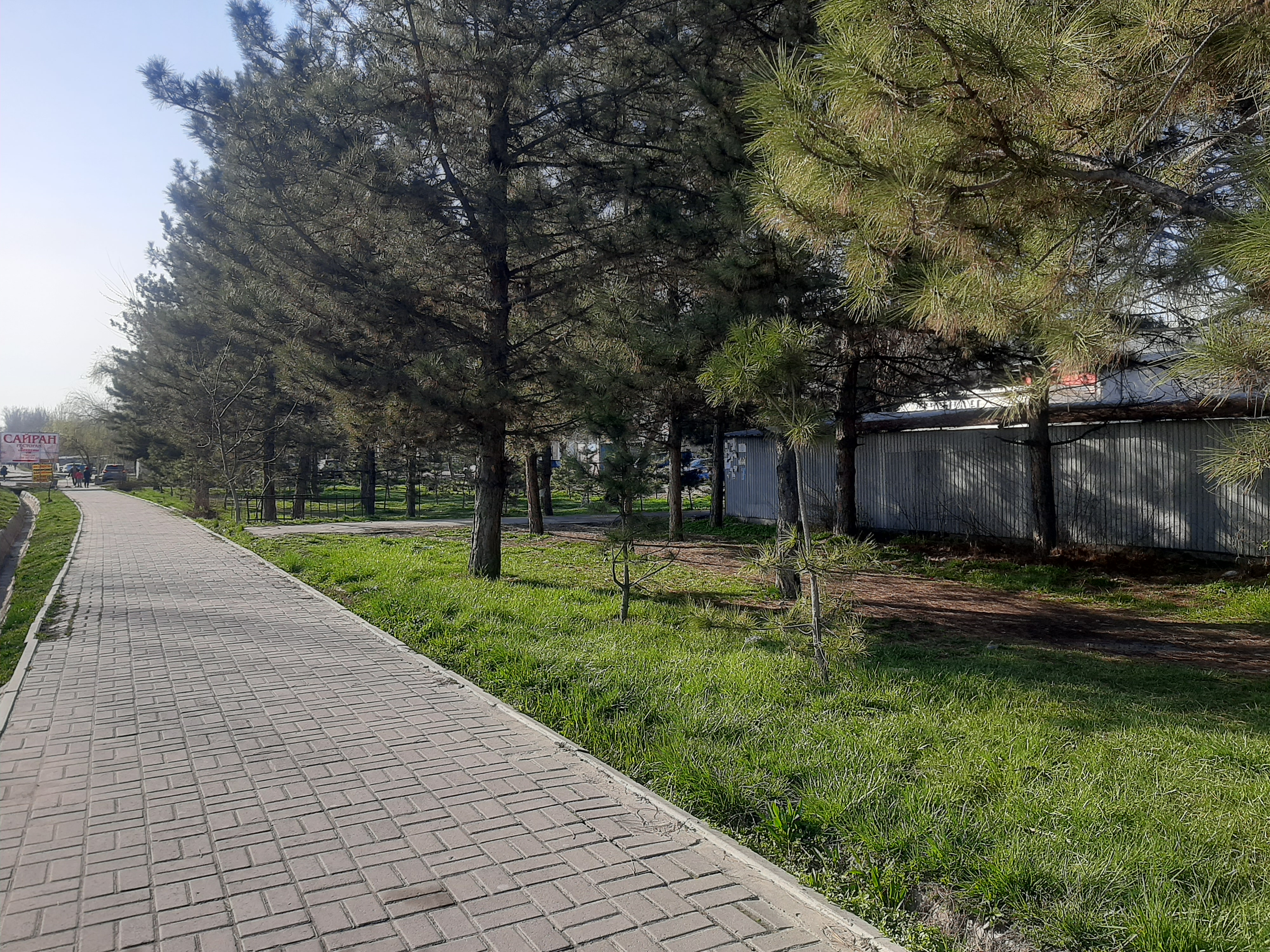

- Location within Kyrgyzstan
- Coordinates: 42°52′48″N 74°40′48″E
- Country: Kyrgyzstan
- Region: Chüy Region
- District: Alamüdün District
- Elevation: 730 m (2,400 ft)

Population (2021)
  - Total: 21,118

Lebedinovka (Kyrgyz: Лебединовка) is a village on the outskirts of the Kyrgyz capital Bishkek. Administratively, however, it is not part of the city, but is the center of the Alamüdün District of Chüy Region, which surrounds Bishkek. Lebedinovka was established in 1898. Its population was 21,118 in 2021.

== Population ==
Historical population
Year	Pop.	±% p.a.
2009	20,709	—
2021	21,118	+0.16%
Note: resident population; Sources:
