= Podgornoye, Chüy =

Podgornoye Подгорное
- Location within Kyrgyzstan
- Coordinates: 42°43′42″N 74°40′14″E
- Country: Kyrgyzstan
- Region: Chüy Region
- District: Alamüdün District
- Elevation: 1,250 m (4,100 ft)

Population (2021)
  - Total: 638
- Time zone: UTC+6

Podgornoye (also Podgornoe, Kyrgyz: Подгорное) is a village in the Alamüdün District in Chüy Region of Kyrgyzstan. Its population was 638 in 2021.
