= Alamüdün District =

Coordinates: 42°52′N 74°40′E

Alamüdün Аламүдүн району
- District
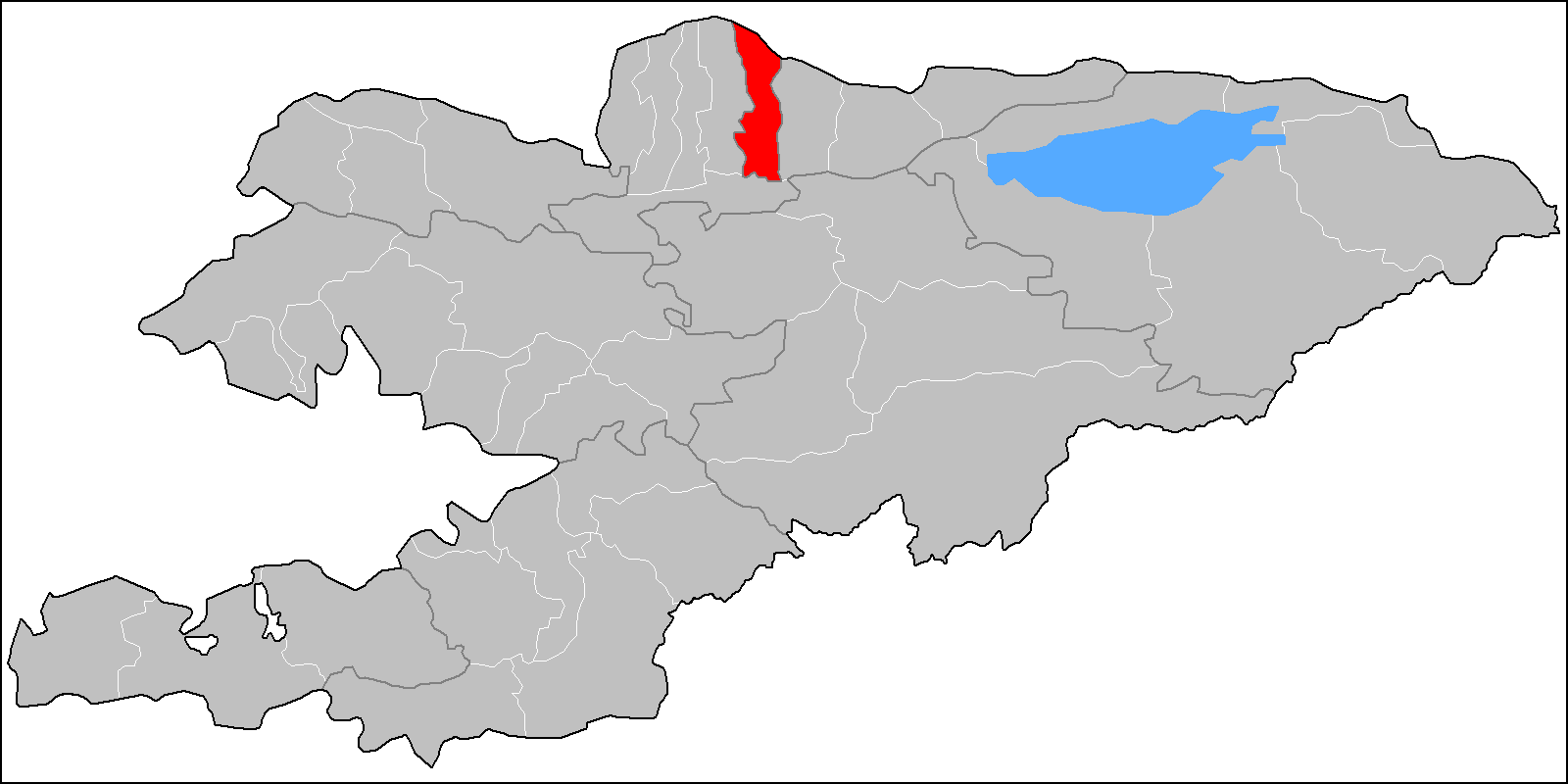
- Country: Kyrgyzstan
- Region: Chüy Region

Area
  - Total: 1,503 km^{2} (580 sq mi)

Population (2021)
  - Total: 188,484
  - Density: 125.4/km^{2} (324.8/sq mi)
- Time zone: UTC+6

Alamüdün (Kyrgyz: Аламүдүн району) is a district of Chüy Region in northern Kyrgyzstan. Its area is 1,503 square kilometres (580 sq mi), and its resident population was 188,484 in 2021. Its administrative seat is Lebedinovka. The district surrounds Bishkek, but does not include it, because the city forms a region-level unit of its own.

== Geography ==
Alamüdün District occupies the central part of the Chüy Valley and extends into the Kyrgyz Ala-Too in the south. It covers 1,439.3 km² and ranges in elevation from about 700 to 4,500 m, with Alamüdün Peak reaching 4,875 m. Most of the northern part lies on the plains of the Chüy and Baytik valleys, while the south is mountainous and includes the Ala-Archa and Alamüdün gorges. The mountains contain several glaciers, including Golubin, Adygine, Kurgaktör and Salyk.

The climate is continental. Mean temperatures range from 22–25 °C in July to −5 to −15 °C in January, and annual precipitation is 300–400 mm. The district lies within the Chu basin; its principal rivers are the Alamüdün and Ala-Archa. It also contains 33 smaller streams and 12 small lakes.

The lowlands are largely cultivated, while mountain steppe and alpine meadow vegetation predominate at higher elevations. Spruce and juniper forests occur in the Ala-Archa basin, which includes Ala-Archa Nature Park.

== Population ==
Historical population
Year	Pop.	±% p.a.
1970	88,455	—
1979	105,051	+1.93%
1989	116,325	+1.02%
1999	122,559	+0.52%
2009	148,032	+1.91%
2021	188,484	+2.03%
Note: resident population; Sources:

== Rural communities and villages ==
In total, Alamüdün District include 51 settlements in 17 rural communities (ayyl aymagy). Each rural community can consist of one or several villages. The rural communities and settlements in the Alamudun District are:

1. Ak-Döbö (seat: Kayyrma; incl. Moldovanovka)
2. Ala-Archa (seat: Mramornoye; incl. Rassvet)
3. Alamüdün (seat: Alamüdün; incl. Sadovoye)
4. Arashan (seat: Arashan; incl. Tatyr)
5. Baytik (seat: Baytik; incl. Archaly, Baygeldi, Bash-Kara-Suu and Kashka-Suu)
6. Grozd (seat: Grozd; incl. At-Bashy, Birdik, Ekinchi Besh Jyldyk and Lesnoye)
7. Kara-Jygach (seat: Kara-Jygach; incl. Bek-Too)
8. Kök-Jar (seat: Kök-Jar)
9. Lebedinovka (seat: Lebedinovka; incl. Vostok and Dachnoye)
10. Lenin (seat: Lenin; incl. Konstantinovka and Mykan)
11. Mayevka (seat: Mayevka)
12. Oktyabr (seat: Oktyabr; incl. Lubyanoye and Chüy)
13. Prigorodnoye (seat: Prigorodnoye; incl. Ozernoye, Stepnoye and Dostuk)
14. Tash-Döbö (seat: Tash-Döbö; incl. Zarechnoye, Malinovka and Süymönkul Chokmorov)
15. Tash-Moynok (seat: Koy-Tash; incl. Besh-Künggöy, Gornaya Mayevka, Kyzyl-Birdik, Podgornoye, Prokhladnoye and Tash-Moynok)
16. Tömönkü Ala-Archa (seat: Tömönkü Ala-Archa)
17. Vasilyevka (seat: Vinogradnoye; incl. Vasilyevka, Polevoye and Privolnoye)
Settlements of the Alamudun District
