= Arashan =

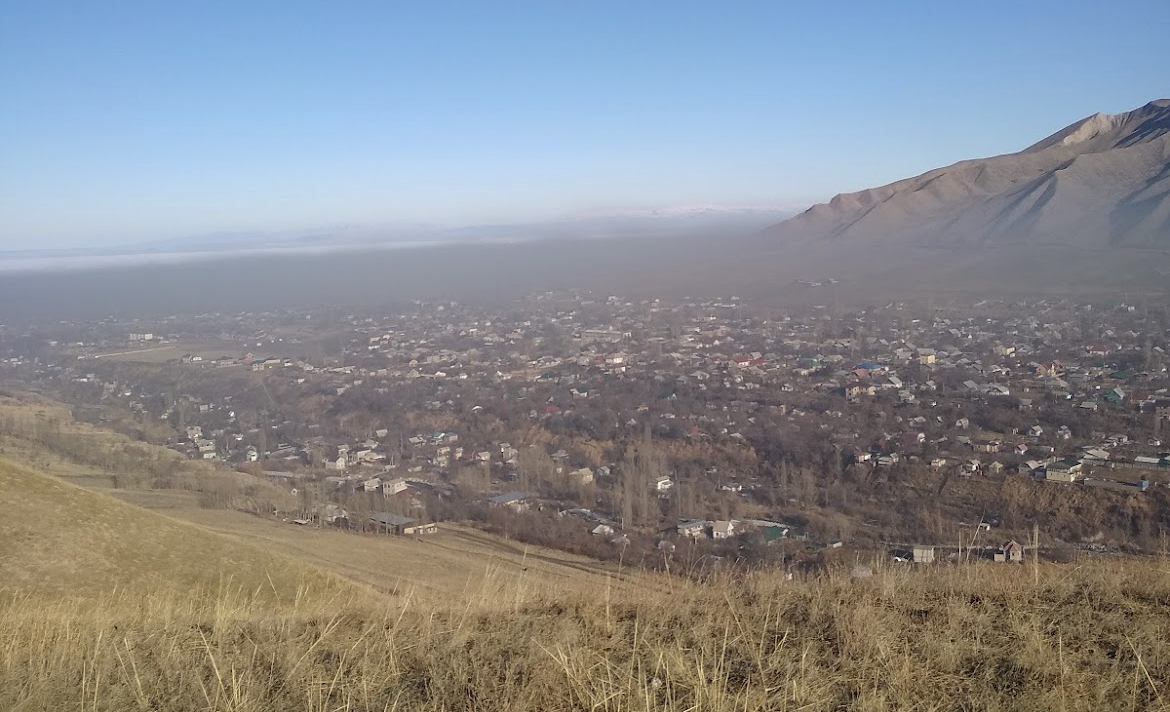

- Location within Kyrgyzstan
- Coordinates: 42°43′55″N 74°38′36″E
- Country: Kyrgyzstan
- Region: Chüy Region
- District: Alamüdün District

Population (2021)
  - Total: 3,791

Arashan is a village located to the south of city of Bishkek, in northern Kyrgyzstan. Its population was at 3,791 in 2021. The road leading north to Bishkek (about 22 km to the centre) becomes the M39 highway which links Bishkek to Almaty, Kazakhstan in the northeast. Nearby settlements include Tash-Moynok just to the northeast and Besh-Küngöy along the main road to the north, Chong-Tash to the northwest, Vorontsovskoye to the southwest and Koy-Tash and Prokhladnoye to the southeast. It lies in a fertile valley with lush green fields. There is a plantation to the north.

== Notable people ==
- Asankhan Dzhumakhmatov (1923–2008) - Kyrgyz composer.
- Almazbek Atambayev (born 1956) - 4th President of Kyrgyzstan
