= Tömönkü Ala-Archa =

Tömönkü Ala-Archa Төмөнкү Ала-Арча
- Location within Kyrgyzstan
- Coordinates: 42°55′50″N 74°36′10″E
- Country: Kyrgyzstan
- Region: Chüy
- District: Alamüdün
- Established: 1947
- Elevation: 701 m (2,300 ft)

Population (2021)
  - Total: 10,760

Tömönkü Ala-Archa (Kyrgyz: Төмөнкү Ала-Арча, Russian: Нижняя Ала-Арча, romanized: Nizhnyaya Ala-Archa) is a village in the Alamüdün District, Chüy Region of Kyrgyzstan. Its population was 10,760 in 2021. It was established in 1947.

== Population ==
Historical population
| Year | Pop. | ±% p.a. |
|---|---|---|
| 1993 | 9,300 | — |
| 2009 | 11,776 | +1.49% |
| 2021 | 10,760 | −0.75% |
Note: resident population; Sources:
