= Archaly, Alamüdün =

Village in Kyrgyzstan

Archaly Арчалы
- Village
- Location within Kyrgyzstan
- Coordinates: 42°43′58″N 74°30′26″E
- Country: Kyrgyzstan
- Region: Chüy Region
- District: Alamüdün District
- Rural community: Baytik Baatyr
- Settled: 1907
- Elevation: 1,200 m (3,900 ft)

Population (2022)
  - Total: 2,994
- Time zone: UTC+6 (UTC+6)

Archaly (Kyrgyz: Арчалы) is a village in Alamüdün District, Chüy Region, Kyrgyzstan, and forms part of the Baytik Baatyr rural community. It lies at an elevation of about 1,200 m (3,900 ft), approximately 30 km (19 mi). The settlement was established in 1907. According to the 2022 census, it had a population of 2,994.
