= Mayevka, Kyrgyzstan =

Mayevka
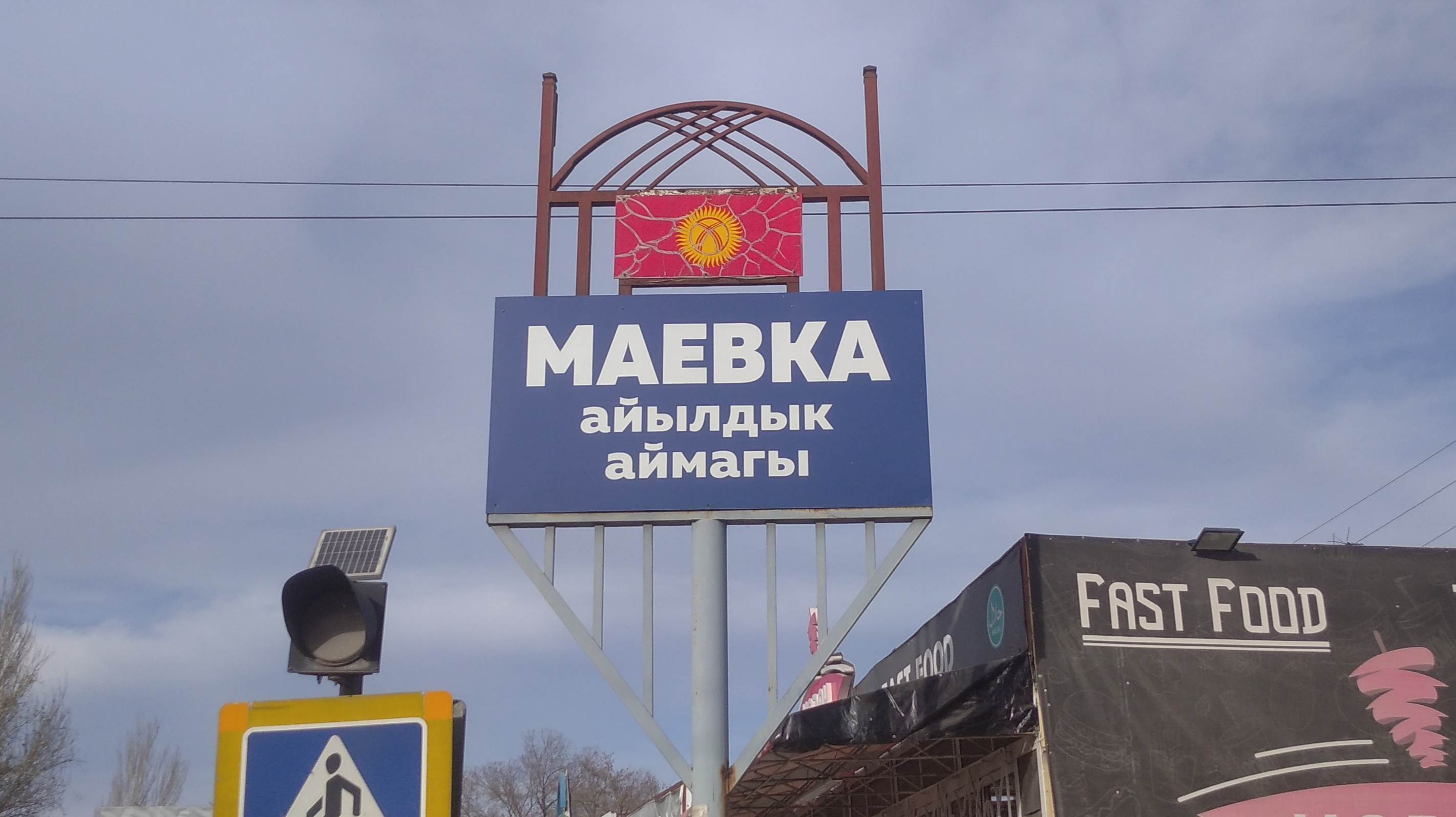

- Location within Kyrgyzstan
- Coordinates: 42°55′30″N 74°34′10″E
- Country: Kyrgyzstan
- Region: Chüy Region
- District: Alamüdün District
- Established: 1930
- Elevation: 706 m (2,316 ft)

Population (2021)
  - Total: 10,535
- Time zone: UTC+6

Mayevka is a village in the Alamüdün District in Chüy Region of Kyrgyzstan. Its population was 10,535 in 2021. The village was established in 1930.

== Population ==
Historical population
Year	Pop.	±% p.a.
1993	6,359	—
2009	10,475	+3.17%
2021	10,535	+0.05%
Note: resident population; Sources:
