= Saler =

- Location within Azerbaijan
- Coordinates: 40°40′N 45°57′E
- Country: Azerbaijan
- Rayon: Shamkir
- Time zone: UTC+4 (AZT)
  - Summer (DST): UTC+5 (AZT)

Saler ( Yeni Göyçə ) is a village in the Shamkir Rayon of Azerbaijan.
