= Lenin, Kyrgyzstan =

Lenin Ленин
- Location within Kyrgyzstan
- Coordinates: 42°58′50″N 74°40′20″E
- Country: Kyrgyzstan
- Region: Chüy
- District: Alamüdün

Population (2021)
  - Total: 10,653
- Time zone: UTC+6

Lenin (Kyrgyz: Ленин, Russian: Ленинское, romanized: Leninskoye) is a village in Chüy Region of Kyrgyzstan. It is part of the Alamüdün District. Its population was 10,653 in 2021.

== Population ==
Historical population
Year	Pop.	±% p.a.
2009	10,493	—
2021	10,653	+0.13%
Note: resident population; Sources:
