= Prigorodnoye, Kyrgyzstan =

Prigorodnoye Пригородное
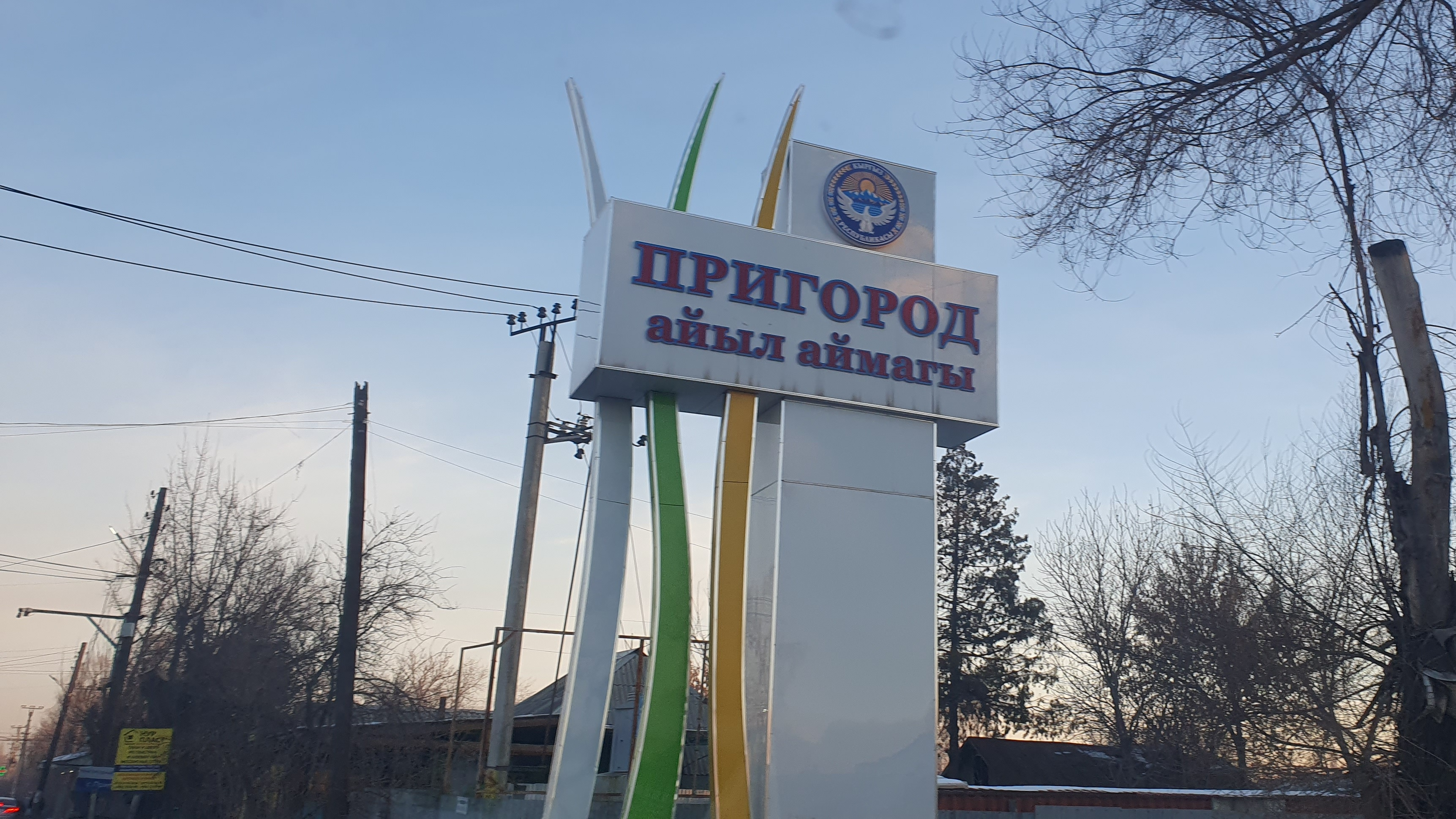

- Location within Kyrgyzstan
- Coordinates: 42°54′10″N 74°32′30″E
- Country: Kyrgyzstan
- Region: Chüy
- District: Alamüdün

Population (2021)
  - Total: 7,406
- Time zone: UTC+6

Prigorodnoye (Kyrgyz: Пригородное) is a village in Chüy Region of Kyrgyzstan. It is part of the Alamüdün District. Its population was 7,406 in 2021.

== Population ==
Historical population
Year	Pop.	±% p.a.
2009	6,388	—
2021	7,406	+1.24%
Note: resident population; Sources:
