= Baygeldi =

Village in Chüy Region, Kyrgyzstan

Baygeldi Байгелди
- Village
- Location within Kyrgyzstan
- Coordinates: 42°45′29″N 74°29′30″E
- Country: Kyrgyzstan
- Region: Chüy Region
- District: Alamüdün District
- Rural community: Baytik Baatyr

Population (2022)
  - Total: 333
- Time zone: UTC+6

Baygeldi (Kyrgyz: Байгелди) is a village in Alamüdün District, Chüy Region, Kyrgyzstan, and forms part of the Baytik Baatyr rural community. According to the 2022 census, it had a population of 333.
