= Ismailbek Taranchiev =

Soviet Kyrgyz aviator (1923–1944)

- Born: 6 April 1923; Besh-Kungey, Chuy Region, Kyrgyzstan
- Died: 18 March 1944 (aged 20); Sinimäe, Estonia (Soviet reports)
- Military career
- Allegiance: Soviet Union
- Branch: Soviet Air Force
- Service years: 1941–1944
- Rank: Junior lieutenant
- Unit: 566th Assault Aviation Regiment
- Conflicts: World War II
- Awards: Hero of the Soviet Union

Ismailbek Taranchiev (Russian: Исмаилбек Таранчиев; 6 April 1923 – 18 March 1944) was a Kyrgyz Soviet aviator and posthumous Hero of the Soviet Union. He is one of the Soviet war heroes to conduct a "fire taran" – a suicide attack by an aircraft on a ground target. After his Ilyushin Il-2 was hit by antiaircraft fire, Taranchiev crashed his plane into a concentration of German tanks in Estonia in March 1944.

== Early life ==
Ismailbek Taranchiev was born on 6 April 1923 in the village of Besh-Kungey in what is now part of the Chuy Region in Kyrgyzstan. Taranchiev graduated from eighth grade.

== World War II ==
By June 1941, Taranchiev had joined the Red Army. In 1943, he graduated from the 3rd Chkalovsky Pilots Military Aviation School. He joined the Communist Party of the Soviet Union in 1944 and fought in combat from January of the year. He became a pilot in the 566th Assault Aviation Regiment, which was assigned to the 277th Assault Aviation Division. A month later, he had made 11 combat sorties, destroying or damaging 13 vehicles, 12 freight carriages, and a motorcycle. He also reportedly suppressed the fire of a machine gun, a mortar, and an artillery gun, as well as killing up to 50 German soldiers. On 13 February his Il-2 was heavily damaged but Taranchiev was managed to land. For an air attack on German ground troops west of Narva on 18 February, the regiment received thanks from the 30th Guards Rifle Corps. Taranchiev was awarded the Order of the Red Star on 22 February for his actions.

On 26 February, along with other aircraft, he conducted a raid on the Axis-held airfield at Tartu. Taranchiev personally destroyed three German aircraft on the ground during the attack. By 18 March, Taranchiev had made 35 successful sorties attacking defense structures, railways, airfields and other targets flying an Il-2 ground attack aircraft.

On 18 March, Taranchiev flew a sortie with four other Il-2s, attacking enemy troops and equipment in the area described in Soviet sources with illiterate village names Jaama-kyule, Kyarikuyula and Lastikolony, which may be Jaama village, Käriküla (no such village in Estonia) and Lastekodumägi. During the attack, Taranchiev's plane was hit by antiaircraft fire and he deliberately crashed his plane into a concentration of enemy tanks, in a maneuver called a "fire taran" – a suicide attack by an aircraft on a ground target. Taranchiev was killed in the crash, as was his gunner, Alexey Tkachev. On 29 April 1944, he was posthumously awarded the Order of the Patriotic War 1st class. For his actions, he was posthumously awarded the title Hero of the Soviet Union and the Order of Lenin on 5 May 1991.

== Legacy ==
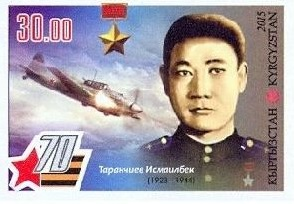
2015 Kyrgyz stamp depicting Taranchiev and his Il-2, issued in commemoration of the 70th anniversary of the end of World War II

In 2015, Kyrgyz Pochtasy issued a stamp depicting Taranchiev and his Il-2 for the 70th anniversary of the end of World War II. A Sukhoi Su-25 of the Russian Air Force based at Kant air base in Kyrgyzstan was named after Taranchiev in 2015.

== See also ==
- Aerial ramming
