= Bash-Kara-Suu =

Village in Chüy Region, Kyrgyzstan

Bash-Kara-Suu Баш-Кара-Суу
- Village
- Location within Kyrgyzstan
- Coordinates: 42°45′56″N 74°32′02″E
- Country: Kyrgyzstan
- Region: Chüy Region
- District: Alamüdün District
- Rural community: Baytik Baatyr

Population (2022)
  - Total: 855
- Time zone: UTC+6

Bash-Kara-Suu (Kyrgyz: Баш-Кара-Суу) is a village in Alamüdün District, Chüy Region, Kyrgyzstan, and forms part of the Baytik Baatyr rural community. According to the 2022 census, it had a population of 855.
