= Vasilyevka, Ust-Kalmansky District, Altai Krai =

Vasilyevka Васильевка
- Settlement
- Location within Altai Krai Location within Russia
- Coordinates: 51°55′N 83°44′E
- Country: Russia
- Region: Altai Krai
- District: Ust-Kalmansky District
- Time zone: UTC+7:00

Vasilyevka (Russian: Васильевка) is a rural locality (a settlement) in Mikhaylovsky Selsoviet, Ust-Kalmansky District, Altai Krai, Russia. The population was 79 as of 2013. There is 1 street.

== Geography ==
Vasilyevka is located 58 km southeast of Ust-Kalmanka (the district's administrative centre) by road. Mikhaylovka is the nearest rural locality.
