= Vasilyevka, Meleuzovsky District, Republic of Bashkortostan =

Vasilyevka Васильевка
- Selo
- Location within Bashkortostan Location within Russia
- Coordinates: 53°05′N 55°57′E
- Country: Russia
- Region: Bashkortostan
- District: Meleuzovsky District
- Time zone: UTC+5:00

Vasilyevka (Russian: Васильевка) is a rural locality (a selo) in Partizansky Selsoviet, Meleuzovsky District, Bashkortostan, Russia. The population was 290 as of 2010. There are 6 streets.

== Geography ==
Vasilyevka is located 21 km north of Meleuz (the district's administrative centre) by road. Ivanovka is the nearest rural locality.
