= Arslanovo, Aurgazinsky District, Republic of Bashkortostan =

Arslanovo Арсланово
- Village
- Location within Bashkortostan Location within Russia
- Coordinates: 54°09′N 55°54′E
- Country: Russia
- Region: Bashkortostan
- District: Aurgazinsky District
- Time zone: UTC+5:00

Arslanovo (Russian: Арсланово; Bashkir: Арыҫлан, Arıślan; Tatar: Арыслан, Arıslan) is a rural locality (a village) in Ishlinsky Selsoviet, Aurgazinsky District, Bashkortostan, Russia. The population was 50 as of 2010. There are 4 streets.

== Geography ==
Arslanovo is located 17 km north of Tolbazy (the district's administrative centre) by road. Yakty-Yul is the nearest rural locality.
