= Vasilyevka, Amur Oblast =

Vasilyevka Васильевка
- Selo
- Location within Amur Oblast Location within Russia
- Coordinates: 50°53′N 128°36′E
- Country: Russia
- Region: Amur Oblast
- District: Belogorsky District
- Time zone: UTC+9:00

Vasilyevka (Russian: Васильевка) is a rural locality (a selo) and the administrative center of Vasilyevsky Selsoviet of Belogorsky District, Amur Oblast, Russia. The population was 2,130 as of 2018. There are 18 streets.

== Geography ==
Vasilyevka is located on the left bank of the Tom River, 11 km southeast of Belogorsk (the district's administrative centre) by road. Mezhdugranka is the nearest rural locality.
