= Kök-Jar, Chüy =

Kök-Jar Көк-Жар
- Location within Kyrgyzstan
- Coordinates: 42°48′20″N 74°38′50″E
- Country: Kyrgyzstan
- Region: Chüy
- District: Alamüdün

Population (2021)
  - Total: 7,350
- Time zone: UTC+6

Kök-Jar (Kyrgyz: Көк-Жар) is a village in Chüy Region of Kyrgyzstan. It is part of the Alamüdün District. Its population was 7,350 in 2021.

== Population ==
Historical population
| Year | Pop. | ±% p.a. |
|---|---|---|
| 2009 | 4,294 | — |
| 2021 | 7,350 | +4.58% |
Note: resident population; Sources:
