= Oktyabr, Ishimbaysky District, Republic of Bashkortostan =

Oktyabr Октябрь
- Village
- Location within Bashkortostan Location within Russia
- Coordinates: 53°38′N 56°02′E
- Country: Russia
- Region: Bashkortostan
- District: Ishimbaysky District
- Time zone: UTC+5:00

Oktyabr (Russian: Октябрь) is a rural locality (a village) in Isheyevsky Selsoviet, Ishimbaysky District, Bashkortostan, Russia. The population was 91 as of 2010. There are 4 streets.

== Geography ==
Oktyabr is located 26 km north of Ishimbay (the district's administrative centre) by road. Shakhtau is the nearest rural locality.
