= Vasilyevka, Yermekeyevsky District, Republic of Bashkortostan =

Vasilyevka Васильевка
- Selo
- Location within Bashkortostan Location within Russia
- Coordinates: 54°06′N 53°44′E
- Country: Russia
- Region: Bashkortostan
- District: Yermekeyevsky District
- Time zone: UTC+5:00

Vasilyevka (Russian: Васильевка) is a rural locality (a selo) in Yermekeyevsky Selsoviet, Yermekeyevsky District, Bashkortostan, Russia. The population was 7 in 2010. There is one street.

== Geography ==
Vasilyevka is located 8 km northeast of Yermekeyevo (the district's administrative centre) by road. Semeno-Makarovo is the nearest rural locality.
