= Vasilyevka, Sobinsky District, Vladimir Oblast =

Vasilyevka Васильевка
- Village
- Location within Vladimir Oblast Location within Russia
- Coordinates: 56°02′N 39°58′E
- Country: Russia
- Region: Vladimir Oblast
- District: Sobinsky District
- Time zone: UTC+3:00

Vasilyevka (Russian: Васильевка) is a rural locality (a village) in Kurilovskoye Rural Settlement, Sobinsky District, Vladimir Oblast, Russia. The population was 438 as of 2010. There are 7 streets.

== Geography ==
Vasilyevka is located 12 km northwest of Sobinka (the district's administrative centre) by road. Lakinsky is the nearest rural locality.
