= Vasilyevka, Sharansky District, Republic of Bashkortostan =

Vasilyevka Васильевка
- Selo
- Location within Bashkortostan Location within Russia
- Coordinates: 55°00′N 54°03′E
- Country: Russia
- Region: Bashkortostan
- District: Sharansky District
- Time zone: UTC+5:00

Vasilyevka (Russian: Васильевка) is a rural locality (a selo) in Pisarevsky Selsoviet, Sharansky District, Bashkortostan, Russia. The population was 11 as of 2010. There is 1 street.

== Geography ==
Vasilyevka is located 34 km north of Sharan (the district's administrative centre) by road. Sakty is the nearest rural locality.
