= Göycəli =

- Municipality
- Location within Azerbaijan
- Coordinates: 41°02′37″N 45°28′37″E
- Country: Azerbaijan
- Rayon: Agstafa

Population
  - Total: 2,354
- Time zone: UTC+4 (AZT)
  - Summer (DST): UTC+5 (AZT)

Göycəli (also, Gëydzhali and Geydzhally) is a village and municipality in the Agstafa Rayon of Azerbaijan. It has a population of 2,354.
