= Vasilyevka, Yuryev-Polsky District, Vladimir Oblast =

Vasilyevka Васильевка
- Village
- Location within Vladimir Oblast Location within Russia
- Coordinates: 56°16′N 39°55′E
- Country: Russia
- Region: Vladimir Oblast
- District: Yuryev-Polsky District
- Time zone: UTC+3:00

Vasilyevka (Russian: Васильевка) is a rural locality (a village) in Nebylovskoye Rural Settlement, Yuryev-Polsky District, Vladimir Oblast, Russia. The population was 18 as of 2010.

== Geography ==
Vasilyevka is located on the Yakhroma River, 40 km southeast of Yuryev-Polsky (the district's administrative centre) by road. Chekovo is the nearest rural locality.
