= Vasilyevka, Sterlitamaksky District, Republic of Bashkortostan =

Vasilyevka Васильевка
- Selo
- Location within Bashkortostan Location within Russia
- Coordinates: 53°28′N 55°55′E
- Country: Russia
- Region: Bashkortostan
- District: Sterlitamaksky District
- Time zone: UTC+5:00

Vasilyevka (Russian: Васильевка) is a rural locality (a selo) in Naumovsky Selsoviet, Sterlitamaksky District, Bashkortostan, Russia. The population was 655 as of 2010. There are 9 streets.

== Geography ==
Vasilyevka is located 20 km south of Sterlitamak (the district's administrative centre) by road. Kantyukovka is the nearest rural locality.
