= Vasilyevka 1-ya =

Vasilyevka 1-ya Васильевка 1-я
- Selo
- Location within Voronezh Oblast Location within Russia
- Coordinates: 51°46′N 40°06′E
- Country: Russia
- Region: Voronezh Oblast
- District: Verkhnekhavsky District
- Time zone: UTC+3:00

Vasilyevka 1-ya (Russian: Васильевка 1-я) is a rural locality (a selo) in Verkhnekhavskoye Rural Settlement, Verkhnekhavsky District, Voronezh Oblast, Russia. The population was 337 as of 2010. There are 3 streets.

== Geography ==
Vasilyevka 1-ya is located 14 km southeast of Verkhnyaya Khava (the district's administrative centre) by road. Verkhnyaya Maza is the nearest rural locality.
