= Vasilyevka, Arkhangelsky District, Republic of Bashkortostan =

Vasilyevka Васильевка
- Village
- Location within Bashkortostan Location within Russia
- Coordinates: 54°21′N 56°42′E
- Country: Russia
- Region: Bashkortostan
- District: Arkhangelsky District
- Time zone: UTC+5:00

Vasilyevka (Russian: Васильевка) is a rural locality (a village) in Krasnozilimsky Selsoviet, Arkhangelsky District, Bashkortostan, Russia. The population was 18 as of 2010. There is 1 street.

== Geography ==
Vasilyevka is located 8 km southwest of Arkhangelskoye (the district's administrative centre) by road. Pobeda is the nearest rural locality.
