= Arslanovo, Karmaskalinsky District, Republic of Bashkortostan =

Arslanovo Арсланово
- Selo
- Location within Bashkortostan Location within Russia
- Coordinates: 54°23′N 55°59′E
- Country: Russia
- Region: Bashkortostan
- District: Karmaskalinsky District
- Time zone: UTC+5:00

Arslanovo (Russian: Арсланово; Bashkir: Арыҫлан, Arıślan) is a rural locality (a selo) in Staromusinsky Selsoviet, Karmaskalinsky District, Bashkortostan, Russia. The population was 209 as of 2010. There are 2 streets.

== Geography ==
Arslanovo is located 22 km west of Karmaskaly (the district's administrative centre) by road. Akkul and Shaymuratovo are the nearest rural localities.
