= Kashka-Suu, Alamüdün =

Village in Chüy Region, Kyrgyzstan

Kashka-Suu Кашка-Суу
- Location within Kyrgyzstan
- Coordinates: 42°42′08″N 74°32′04″E
- Country: Kyrgyzstan
- Region: Chüy Region
- District: Alamüdün District
- Rural community: Baytik Baatyr

Population (2022)
  - Total: 1,844
- Time zone: UTC+6

Kashka-Suu (Kyrgyz: Кашка-Суу) is a village in Alamüdün District, Chüy Region, Kyrgyzstan, and forms part of the Baytik Baatyr rural community. It is situated on the Ala-Archa River and is traversed by the M-010 road, which connects Chon-Aryk with Ala Archa National Park.According to the 2022 census, it had a population of 1,844.
