= Vasilyevka, Anninsky District, Voronezh Oblast =

Vasilyevka Васильевка
- Selo
- Location within Voronezh Oblast Location within Russia
- Coordinates: 51°29′N 40°11′E
- Country: Russia
- Region: Voronezh Oblast
- District: Anninsky District
- Time zone: UTC+3:00

Vasilyevka (Russian: Васильевка) is a rural locality (a selo) and the administrative center of Vasilyevskoye Rural Settlement, Anninsky District, Voronezh Oblast, Russia. The population was 586 as of 2010. There are 6 streets.

== Geography ==
Vasilyevka is located on the Vasilyevka River, 17 km west of Anna (the district's administrative centre) by road. Novonadezhdensky is the nearest rural locality.
