= Keken-Vasilyevka =

Keken-Vasilyevka Кекен-Васильевка
- Selo
- Location within Bashkortostan Location within Russia
- Coordinates: 53°42′N 54°43′E
- Country: Russia
- Region: Bashkortostan
- District: Miyakinsky District
- Time zone: UTC+5:00

Keken-Vasilyevka (Russian: Кекен-Васильевка; Bashkir: Кәкән-Васильевка, Käkän-Vasilyevka) is a rural locality (a selo) in Kozhay-Semyonovsky Selsoviet, Miyakinsky District, Bashkortostan, Russia. The population was 303 as of 2010. There are 2 streets.

== Geography ==
Keken-Vasilyevka is located 14 km northwest of Kirgiz-Miyaki (the district's administrative centre) by road. Chayka is the nearest rural locality.
