= Arslanovo, Chishminsky District, Republic of Bashkortostan =

Arslanovo Арсланово
- Selo
- Location within Bashkortostan Location within Russia
- Coordinates: 54°40′N 55°24′E
- Country: Russia
- Region: Bashkortostan
- District: Chishminsky District
- Time zone: UTC+5:00

Arslanovo (Russian: Арсланово; Bashkir: Арыҫлан, Arıślan) is a rural locality (a selo) and the administrative centre of Arslanovsky Selsoviet, Chishminsky District, Bashkortostan, Russia. The population was 650 as of 2010. There are 13 streets.

== Geography ==
Arslanovo is located 11 km north of Chishmy, the district's administrative seat. Novaya is the nearest rural locality.
