= Vasilyevka, Volgograd Oblast =

Vasilyevka Васильевка
- Selo
- Location within Volgograd Oblast Location within Russia
- Coordinates: 48°08′N 43°49′E
- Country: Russia
- Region: Volgograd Oblast
- District: Oktyabrsky District
- Time zone: UTC+4:00

Vasilyevka (Russian: Васильевка) is a rural locality (a selo) and the administrative center of Vasilyevskoye Rural Settlement, Oktyabrsky District, Volgograd Oblast, Russia. The population was 411 as of 2010. There are 11 streets.

== Geography ==
The village is located on Yergeni, on the Myshkova River, 190 km from Volgograd, 34 km from Oktyabrsky.
