= Vasilyevka, Gribanovsky District, Voronezh Oblast =

Vasilyevka Васильевка
- Selo
- Location within Voronezh Oblast Location within Russia
- Coordinates: 51°17′N 41°44′E
- Country: Russia
- Region: Voronezh Oblast
- District: Gribanovsky District
- Time zone: UTC+3:00

Vasilyevka (Russian: Васи́льевка) is a rural locality (a selo) and the administrative center of Vasilyevskoye Rural Settlement, Gribanovsky District, Voronezh Oblast, Russia. The population was 580 as of 2010. There are 16 streets.

== Geography ==
Vasilyevka is located 31 km southwest of Gribanovsky (the district's administrative centre) by road. Nizhny Karachan is the nearest rural locality.
