= Vasilyevka, Permsky District, Perm Krai =

Vasilyevka Васильевка
- Village
- Location within Perm Krai Location within Russia
- Coordinates: 57°49′N 55°28′E
- Country: Russia
- Region: Perm Krai
- District: Permsky District
- Time zone: UTC+5:00

Vasilyevka (Russian: Васильевка) is a rural locality (a village) in Zabolotskoye Rural Settlement, Permsky District, Perm Krai, Russia. The population was 30 as of 2010. There are five streets.

== Geography ==
Vasilyevka is located 66 km southwest of Perm (the district's administrative centre) by road. Verkh-Rechka is the nearest rural locality.
