= Vasilyevka, Ertilsky District, Voronezh Oblast =

Vasilyevka Васильевка
- Settlement
- Location within Voronezh Oblast Location within Russia
- Coordinates: 51°46′N 40°48′E
- Country: Russia
- Region: Voronezh Oblast
- District: Ertilsky District
- Time zone: UTC+3:00

Vasilyevka (Russian: Васильевка) is a rural locality (a settlement) in Pervoertilskoye Rural Settlement, Ertilsky District, Voronezh Oblast, Russia. The population was 29 as of 2010.

== Geography ==
Vasilyevka is located 8 km south of Ertil (the district's administrative centre) by road. Ertil is the nearest rural locality.
