= Vasilyevka, Kyrgyzstan =

Vasilyevka Васильевка
- Location within Kyrgyzstan
- Coordinates: 43°05′50″N 74°35′10″E
- Country: Kyrgyzstan
- Region: Chüy
- District: Alamüdün

Population (2021)
  - Total: 6,422
- Time zone: UTC+6

Vasilyevka (Kyrgyz: Васильевка) is a village in Chüy Region of Kyrgyzstan. It is part of the Alamüdün District. Its population was 6,422 in 2021.

== Population ==
Historical population
Year	Pop.	±% p.a.
2009	3,661	—
2021	6,422	+4.79%
Note: resident population; Sources:
