= Vasilyevka, Zilairsky District, Republic of Bashkortostan =

Vasilyevka Васильевка
- Village
- Location within Bashkortostan Location within Russia
- Coordinates: 52°05′N 57°35′E
- Country: Russia
- Region: Bashkortostan
- District: Zilairsky District
- Time zone: UTC+5:00

Vasilyevka (Russian: Васильевка) is a rural locality (a village) in Zilairsky Selsoviet, Zilairsky District, Bashkortostan, Russia. The population was 66 (2010 census); 100 (2002 census); There are 3 streets.

== Geography ==
Vasilyevka is located 22 km southeast of Zilair (the district's administrative centre) by road. Vladimiro-Nikolayevsky is the nearest rural locality.
