= Aşağı Göycəli =

- Municipality
- Location within Azerbaijan
- Coordinates: 41°06′57″N 45°29′07″E
- Country: Azerbaijan
- Rayon: Aghstafa
- Elevation: 341 m (1,119 ft)

Population (2009)
  - Total: 2,218
- Time zone: UTC+4 (AZT)

Aşağı Göycəli (also, Göycəli, Gëydzhali, and Gadzhally) is a village and municipality in the Aghstafa District of Azerbaijan. It has a population of 1,950.
