= Novaya Vasilyevka =

Novaya Vasilyevka Новая Васильевка
- Village
- Location within Bashkortostan Location within Russia
- Coordinates: 53°28′N 55°50′E
- Country: Russia
- Region: Bashkortostan
- District: Sterlitamaksky District
- Time zone: UTC+5:00

Novaya Vasilyevka (Russian: Новая Васильевка) is a rural locality (a village) in Ayuchevsky Selsoviet, Sterlitamaksky District, Bashkortostan, Russia. The population was 246 as of 2010. There are 3 streets.

== Geography ==
Novaya Vasilyevka is located 23 km south of Sterlitamak (the district's administrative centre) by road. Novonikolayevsky is the nearest rural locality.
