= Vasilyevka, Ishimbaysky District, Republic of Bashkortostan =

Vasilyevka Васильевка
- Village
- Location within Bashkortostan Location within Russia
- Coordinates: 53°37′N 56°28′E
- Country: Russia
- Region: Bashkortostan
- District: Ishimbaysky District
- Time zone: UTC+5:00

Vasilyevka (Russian: Васильевка) is a rural locality (a village) in Petrovsky Selsoviet, Ishimbaysky District, Bashkortostan, Russia. The population was 729 as of 2010. There are 7 streets.

== Geography ==
Vasilyevka is located 41 km northeast of Ishimbay (the district's administrative centre) by road. Kalmakovo is the nearest rural locality.
