= Staraya Vasilyevka =

Staraya Vasilyevka Старая Васильевка
- Selo
- Location within Bashkortostan Location within Russia
- Coordinates: 53°53′N 54°46′E
- Country: Russia
- Region: Bashkortostan
- District: Alsheyevsky District
- Time zone: UTC+5:00 (CET)

Staraya Vasilyevka (Russian: Старая Васильевка; Tatar: Иске Вәсели, İske Väseli; Bashkir: Иҫке Васильевка, İśke Vasilyevka) is a rural locality (a selo) in Mendyanovsky Selsoviet, Alsheyevsky District, Bashkortostan, Russia. The population was 266 as of 2010. There are 5 streets.

== Geography ==
Staraya Vasilyevka is located 33 km southwest of Rayevsky (the district's administrative centre) by road. Mendyanovo is the nearest rural locality.
