= Vasilyevka, Buturlinovsky District, Voronezh Oblast =

Vasilyevka Васильевка
- Selo
- Location within Voronezh Oblast Location within Russia
- Coordinates: 50°55′N 40°59′E
- Country: Russia
- Region: Voronezh Oblast
- District: Buturlinovsky District
- Time zone: UTC+3:00

Vasilyevka (Russian: Васильевка) is a rural locality (a selo) and the administrative center of Vasilyevskoye Rural Settlement, Buturlinovsky District, Voronezh Oblast, Russia. The population was 1,001 as of 2010. There are 15 streets.

== Geography ==
Vasilyevka is located 36 km northeast of Buturlinovka (the district's administrative centre) by road. Kucheryayevka is the nearest rural locality.
