= Arslanovo, Buzdyaksky District, Republic of Bashkortostan =

Arslanovo Арсланово
- Selo
- Location within Bashkortostan Location within Russia
- Coordinates: 54°39′N 54°23′E
- Country: Russia
- Region: Bashkortostan
- District: Buzdyaksky District
- Time zone: UTC+5:00

Arslanovo (Russian: Арсланово; Bashkir: Арыҫлан, Arıślan) is a rural locality (a selo) in Arslanovsky Selsoviet, Buzdyaksky District, Bashkortostan, Russia. The population was 482 as of 2010. There are 4 streets.

== Geography ==
Arslanovo is located 21 km northwest of Buzdyak (the district's administrative centre) by road. Starye Bogady is the nearest rural locality.
