= Vasilyevka, Khabarsky District, Altai Krai =

Vasilyevka Васильевка
- Settlement
- Location within Altai Krai Location within Russia
- Coordinates: 53°34′N 79°50′E
- Country: Russia
- Region: Altai Krai
- District: Khabarsky District
- Time zone: UTC+7:00

Vasilyevka (Russian: Васильевка) is a rural locality (a settlement) in Plyoso-Kuryinsky Selsoviet, Khabarsky District, Altai Krai, Russia. The population was 207 as of 2013. It was founded in 1910. There are 5 streets.

== Geography ==
Vasilyevka is located 38 km east of Khabary (the district's administrative centre) by road. Plyoso-Kurya is the nearest rural locality.
