= Oktyabr, Chüy =

Oktyabr Октябрь
- Location within Kyrgyzstan
- Coordinates: 43°07′00″N 74°29′40″E
- Country: Kyrgyzstan
- Region: Chüy
- District: Alamüdün

Population (2021)
  - Total: 7,621
- Time zone: UTC+6

Oktyabr (Kyrgyz: Октябрь, Russian: Октябрьское, romanized: Oktyabrskoye) is a village in Chüy Region of Kyrgyzstan. It is part of the Alamüdün District. Its population was 7,621 in 2021.

== Population ==
Historical population
Year	Pop.	±% p.a.
2009	5,439	—
2021	7,621	+2.85%
Note: resident population; Sources:
