= Vasilyevka, Gryazovetsky District, Vologda Oblast =

Vasilyevka Васильевка
- Village
- Location within Vologda Oblast Location within Russia
- Coordinates: 58°53′N 41°06′E
- Country: Russia
- Region: Vologda Oblast
- District: Gryazovetsky District
- Time zone: UTC+3:00

Vasilyevka (Russian: Васильевка) is a rural locality (a village) in Vokhtozhskoye Rural Settlement, Gryazovetsky District, Vologda Oblast, Russia. The population was 3 as of 2002.

== Geography ==
Vasilyevka is located 74 km east of Gryazovets (the district's administrative centre) by road. Putilovo is the nearest rural locality.
