= Ala-Archa =

Ala-Archa Alarcha
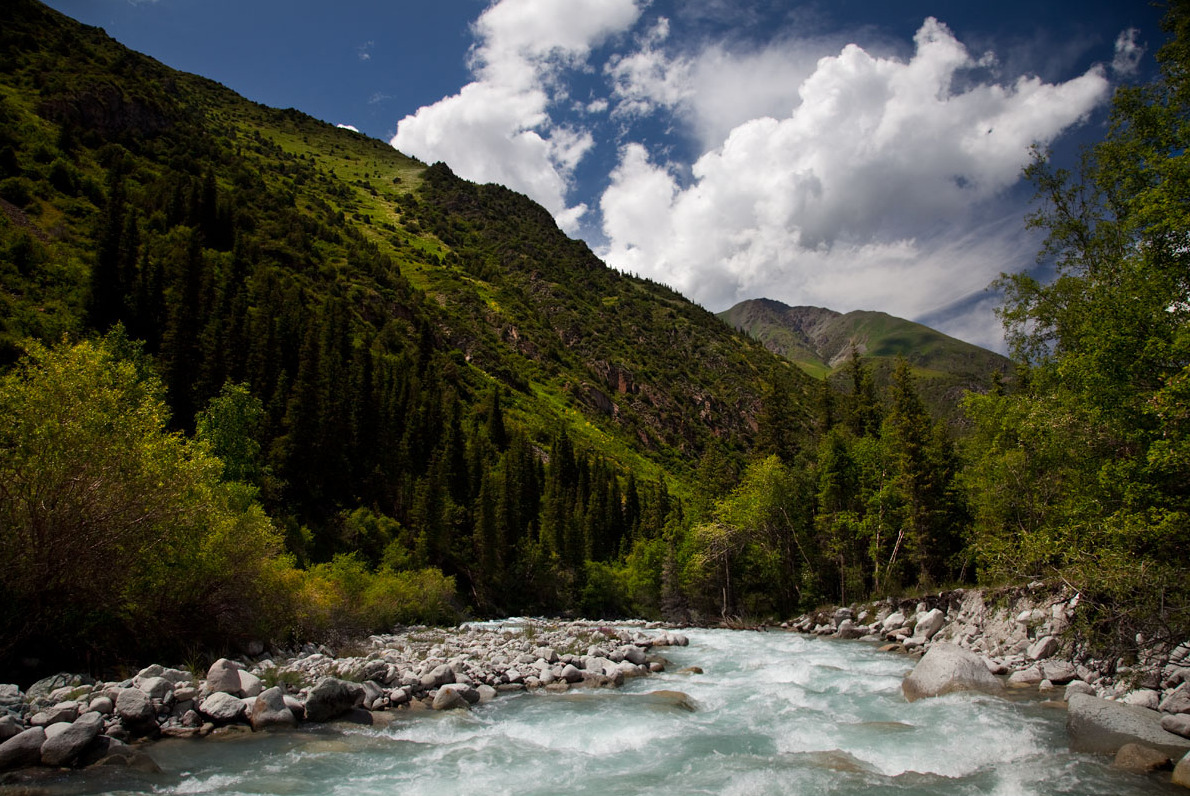
- Native name: Ала-Арча (Kyrgyz)

Location
- Country: Kyrgyzstan
- Region: Chüy Region
- District: Alamüdün District
- City: Bishkek

Physical characteristics
- Source
  - location: Northern slope of the Kyrgyz Ala-Too
- Mouth: Chu
  - coordinates: 43.0623°N 74.6382°E
- Length: 78 km (48 mi)
- Basin size: 270 km^{2} (100 sq mi)
- Discharge
  - average: 4.17 m^{3}/s (147 cu ft/s)
  - minimum: 0.81 m^{3}/s (29 cu ft/s)
  - maximum: 50 m^{3}/s (1,800 cu ft/s)

Basin features
- Progression: Chu→ Betpak-Dala desert
- Tributaries
  - right: Kashka-Suu

The Ala-Archa (Kyrgyz: Ала-Арча; also Alarcha, Аларча) is a river in Alamüdün District, Chüy Region, Kyrgyzstan, flowing through Bishkek. It belongs to the Chu river system and is traditionally regarded as a left tributary of the Chu. The river is 78 km (48 mi) long and has a drainage basin of 270 km^{2} (100 sq mi).

== Course ==
The Ala-Archa rises from glaciers on the northern slope of the Kyrgyz Ala-Too. Its upper course flows through a narrow mountain gorge. After the confluence with the Kashka-Suu river, the river emerges into the Baytik Depression.

Below Chon-Aryk, the river flows north through Bishkek. Settlements along its course include Kashka-Suu, Tash-Döbö, Ortolysh, Chon-Aryk, Orto-Say and Mayevka.

Its main tributaries include the Ak-Sai, Teke-Tör, Top-Karagai, Tuyuk-Suu, Jindi-Suu, Adygene and Kashka-Suu.

== Hydrology ==
The Ala-Archa is fed mainly by glaciers and snow. Its high-water period begins in May and continues until late September. The mean annual discharge is 4.17 m^{3}/s (147 cu ft/s), with a recorded maximum of 50 m^{3}/s (1,800 cu ft/s) and a minimum of 0.81 m^{3}/s (29 cu ft/s).

The drainage basin contains five lakes and 33 glaciers with a combined area of 53.6 km^{2} (20.7 sq mi).

== Environment ==
The upper basin of the Ala-Archa lies within Ala Archa National Park, which was established in 1976 to protect the mountain landscapes and ecosystems of the upper Ala-Archa valley.

The protected area includes juniper woodlands, patches of spruce forest, subalpine and alpine meadows, and riparian vegetation. More than 600 species of higher plants have been recorded within the park.

The Ala-Archa is the principal river of the park, with tributaries including the Ak-Sai and Adygene.

=== Water quality ===
Kyrgyzhydromet monitors water quality in the Ala-Archa at a sampling site 1 km downstream of Bishkek. Published bulletins for 2024–2026 report occasional exceedances of water-quality limits for fisheries: five-day biochemical oxygen demand (BOD₅) exceeded the limit in December 2024, May 2025 and December 2025; ammonium nitrogen in July 2024 and May 2025; and total iron in August 2026. Reported nitrate nitrogen concentrations remained below the applicable limit.

The published record contains gaps, and the range of indicators reported varies between months. These observations document intermittent exceedances but are insufficient to establish a sustained deterioration in water quality.

== Water use ==
The waters of the Ala-Archa are extensively used for irrigation. Two reservoirs have been constructed on the Ala-Archa. The Upper Ala-Archa Reservoir is situated near Kashka-Suu, while the Lower Ala-Archa Reservoir lies on the lower course of the river north of Bishkek. Because of water abstraction for irrigation, the Ala-Archa normally does not reach the Chu River.

== Gallery ==
Ala-Archa in the upper mountain valley

Confluence of the Ak-Sai and Ala-Archa

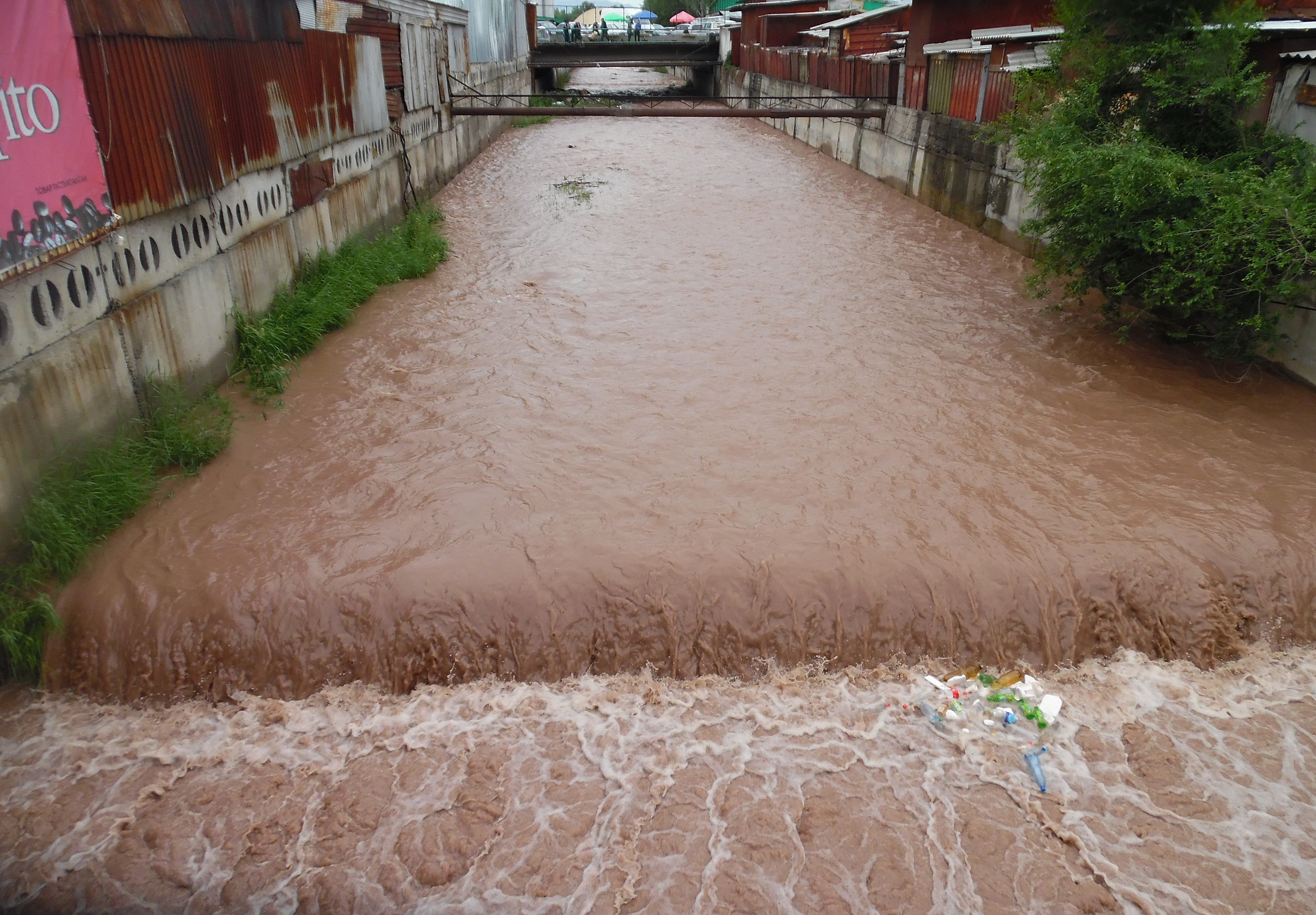
Ala-Archa in Bishkek after spring rains

Ala-Archa Reservoir
