= Göyçəkənd =

- Location within Azerbaijan
- Coordinates: 40°42′17″N 46°19′40″E
- Country: Azerbaijan
- City: Goygol District
- Time zone: UTC+4 (AZT)
  - Summer (DST): UTC+5 (AZT)

Göyçəkənd (also, Gəyçəkənd, known as Oktyabr until 1999) is a village and municipality in the Goygol Rayon of Azerbaijan. It has a population of 683.
