= Besh-Kungoy =

Besh-Kungoy Беш-Күңгөй
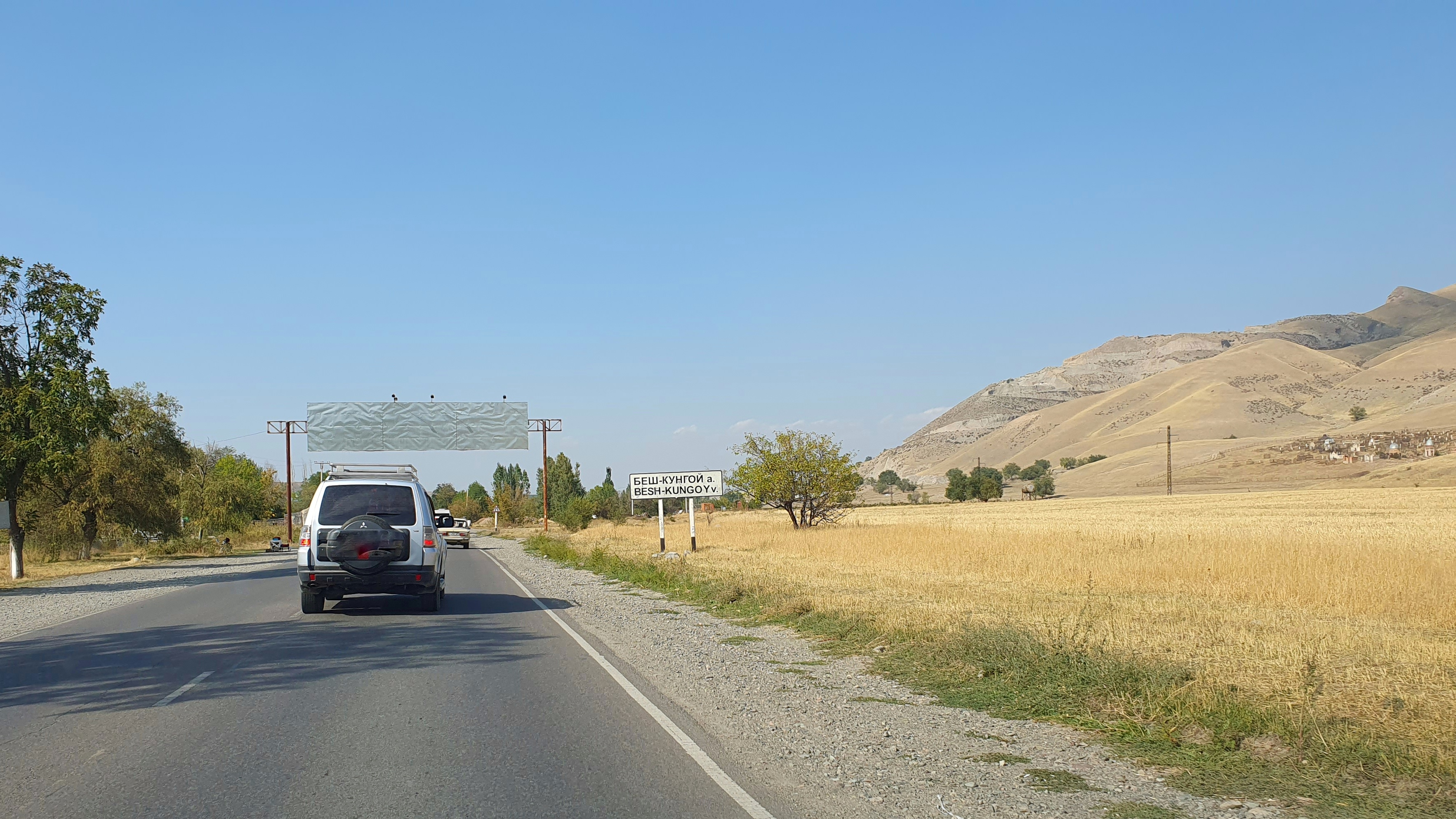

- Location within Kyrgyzstan
- Coordinates: 42°46′24″N 74°38′50″E
- Country: Kyrgyzstan
- Region: Chüy
- District: Alamüdün
- Established: 1898
- Elevation: 1,095 m (3,593 ft)

Population (2021)
  - Total: 3,856
- Time zone: UTC+6

Besh-Kungoy (also Besh-Kyungey, Kyrgyz: Беш-Күңгөй) is a village in the Alamüdün District in Chüy Region of Kyrgyzstan. Its population was 3,856 in 2021. It was established in 1898.

== Notable people ==
- Ismailbek Taranchiev (April 6, 1923 - April 26, 1944) - Soviet aviator, Hero of the Soviet Union.
