= Ağçay, Khachmaz =

Ağçay
- Municipality
- Location within Azerbaijan
- Coordinates: 41°29′13″N 48°56′27″E
- Country: Azerbaijan
- Rayon: Khachmaz

Population
  - Total: 387
- Time zone: UTC+4 (AZT)
  - Summer (DST): UTC+5 (AZT)

Ağçay (known as Vasilyevka until 1992) is a village and municipality in the Khachmaz Rayon of Azerbaijan. Founded in the nineteenth century as an ethnic Russian village, it had a population of 387 as of 2009.
