= Yeni Göyçə =

- Municipality
- Location within Azerbaijan
- Coordinates: 40°40′24″N 45°56′56″E
- Country: Azerbaijan
- Rayon: Shamkir

Population
  - Total: 215
- Time zone: UTC+4 (AZT)
  - Summer (DST): UTC+5 (AZT)

Yeni Göyçə (previously known as Saler) is a village and municipality in the Shamkir Rayon of Azerbaijan. It has a population of 215.
