= Alamüdün =

Alamüdün Аламүдүн
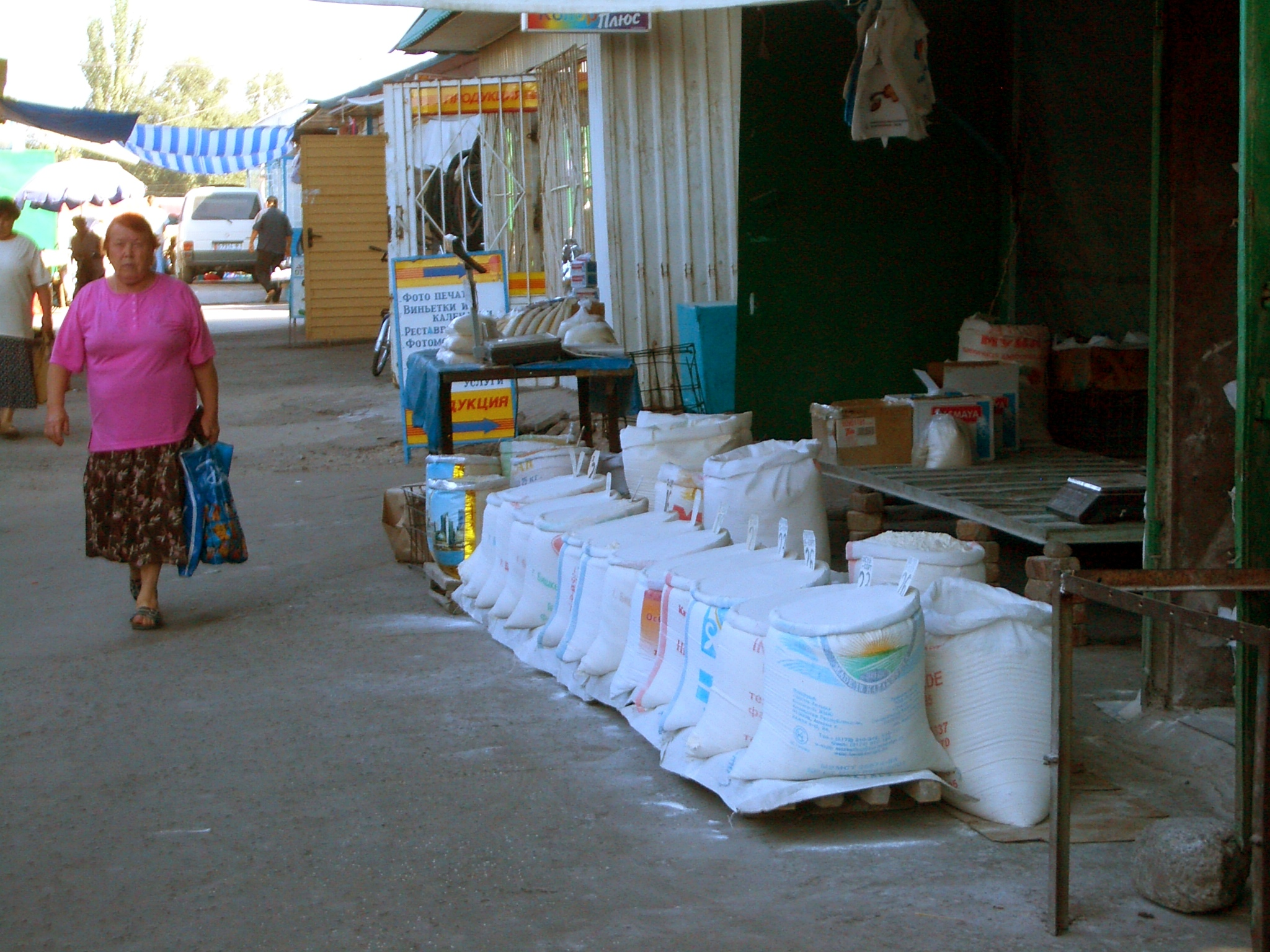
- Alamüdün Bazaar

- Location within Kyrgyzstan
- Coordinates: 42°53′24″N 74°37′48″E
- Country: Kyrgyzstan
- Region: Chüy Region
- District: Alamüdün District
- Elevation: 713 m (2,339 ft)

Population (2021)
  - Total: 12,198
- Time zone: UTC+6

Alamüdün (Kyrgyz: Аламүдүн, also Alamedin and Alamudun) is a town and northern suburb of Bishkek in Chüy Region of Kyrgyzstan, part of Alamüdün District (raion). Its population was 12,198 in 2021. It lies along the M39 highway which leads to Korday on the Kazakh border and further to Almaty. Alamüdün contains an elm grove park to the west with Lake Komsomolskoye. Its main market is the Alamüdün Bazaar and its football club, FC Alamudun, plays in the top division in Kyrgyzstan, the Kyrgyzstan League. It is the birthplace of Tatyana Kolpakova.

== Population ==
Historical population
Year	Pop.	±% p.a.
2009	11,773	—
2021	12,198	+0.30%
Note: resident population; Sources:
