= Verkhniye Kigi =

Verkhniye Kigi Верхние Киги
- Selo

Other transcription(s)
  - Bashkir: Үрге Ҡыйғы
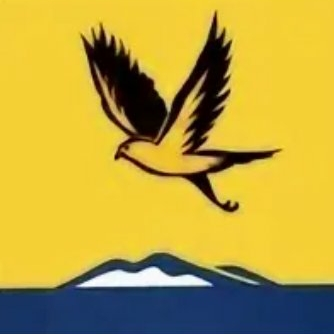
- Flag
- Interactive map of Verkhniye Kigi
- Location of Verkhniye Kigi Verkhniye Kigi (Bashkortostan)
- Coordinates: 55°24′19″N 58°36′15″E
- Country: Russia
- Federal subject: Bashkortostan
- Administrative district: Kiginsky District
- SelsovietSelsoviet: Verkhnekiginsky
- Founded: 1703
- Elevation: 267 m (876 ft)

Population (2010 Census)
  - Total: 6,637

Administrative status
  - Capital of: Kiginsky District, Verkhnekiginsky Selsoviet

Municipal status
  - Municipal district: Kiginsky Municipal District
  - Rural settlement: Verkhnekiginsky Selsoviet Rural Settlement
  - Capital of: Kiginsky Municipal District, Verkhnekiginsky Selsoviet Rural Settlement
- Time zone: UTC+5 (MSK+2)
- Postal code: 452500
- OKTMO ID: 80636415101

Verkhniye Kigi (Russian: Ве́рхние Киги́, Bashkir: Үрге Ҡыйғы, romanized: Ürge Qıyğı) is a rural locality (a selo) and the administrative center of Kiginsky District in the Republic of Bashkortostan, Russia. Population: 6,637 (2010 census); 6,872 (2002 census); 6,259 (1989 Soviet census).
