= Kiginsky District =

Kiginsky District Кигинский район (Russian)
- District

Other transcription(s)
  - Bashkir: Ҡыйғы районы
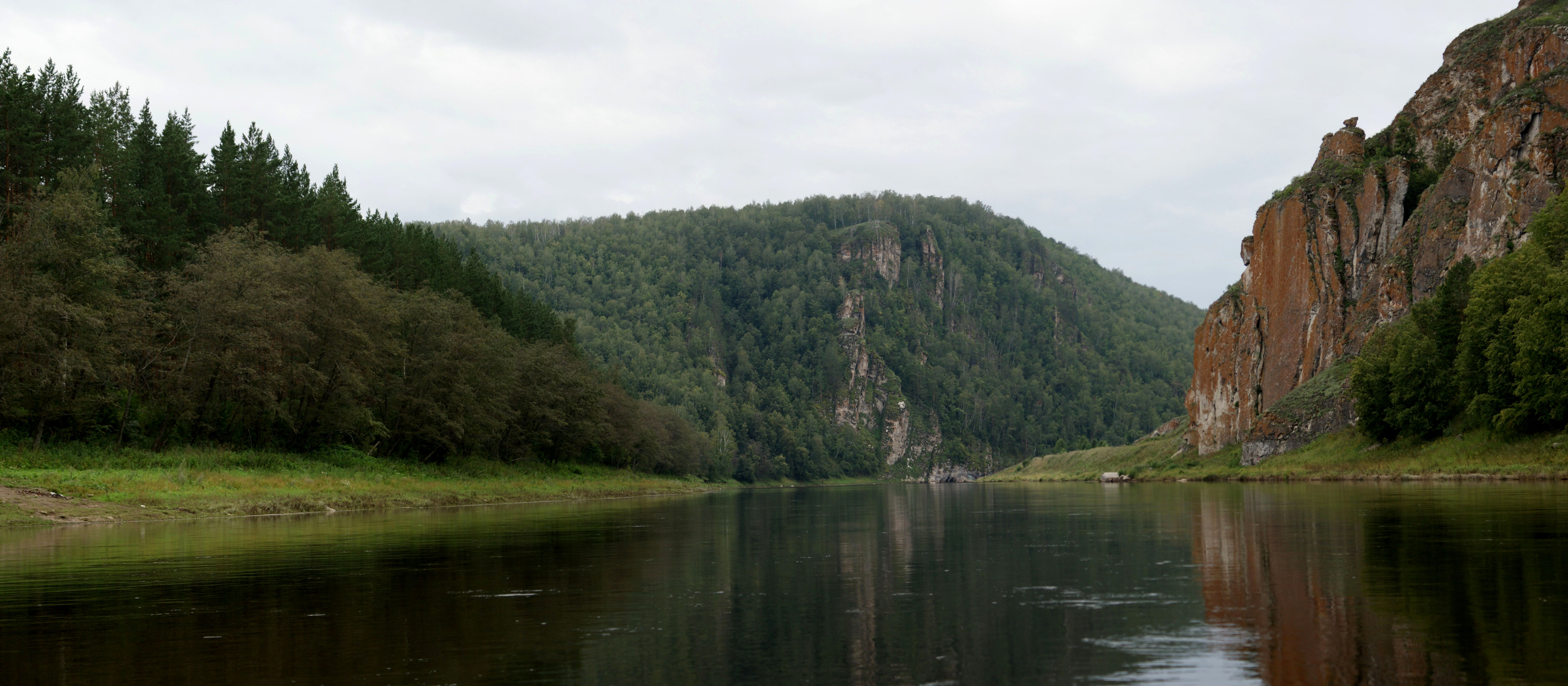
- Sokolinaya Forest, Kiginsky District

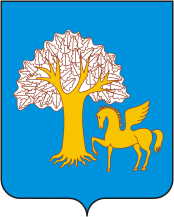
- Flag Coat of arms
- Location of Kiginsky District in the Republic of Bashkortostan
- Coordinates: 55°24′N 58°36′E
- Country: Russia
- Federal subject: Republic of Bashkortostan
- Established: August 20, 1930
- Administrative center: Verkhniye Kigi

Area
  - Total: 1,688 km^{2} (652 sq mi)

Population (2010 Census)
  - Total: 19,137
  - Estimate (2018): 17,023 (−11%)
  - Density: 11.34/km^{2} (29.36/sq mi)
  - Urban: 0%
  - Rural: 100%

Administrative structure
  - Administrative divisions: 9 Selsoviets
  - Inhabited localities: 39 rural localities

Municipal structure
  - Municipally incorporated as: Kiginsky Municipal District
  - Municipal divisions: 0 urban settlements, 9 rural settlements
- Time zone: UTC+5 (MSK+2)
- OKTMO ID: 80636000
- Website: http://www.kigiadm.ru

Population of Kiginsky District
- 2010 Census: 19,137
- 2002 Census: 19,825
- 1989 Census: 18,897
- 1979 Census: 20,539

Kiginsky District (Russian: Киги́нский райо́н; Bashkir: Ҡыйғы районы, Qıyğı rayonı; Tatar: Кыйгы районы, Qıyğı rayonı) is an administrative and municipal district (raion), one of the fifty-four in the Republic of Bashkortostan, Russia. It is located in the northeast of the republic and borders with Mechetlinsky and Belokataysky Districts in the north, Chelyabinsk Oblast in the east and southeast, Salavatsky District in the south and southwest, and with Duvansky District in the west. The area of the district is 1,688 square kilometers (652 sq mi). Its administrative center is the rural locality (a selo) of Verkhniye Kigi. As of the 2010 Census, the total population of the district was 19,137, with the population of Verkhniye Kigi accounting for 34.7% of that number.

== History ==
The district was established on August 20, 1930.

== Administrative and municipal status ==
Within the framework of administrative divisions, Kiginsky District is one of the fifty-four in the Republic of Bashkortostan. The district is divided into nine selsoviets, comprising thirty-nine rural localities. As a municipal division, the district is incorporated as Kiginsky Municipal District. Its nine selsoviets are incorporated as nine rural settlements within the municipal district. The selo of Verkhniye Kigi serves as the administrative center of both the administrative and municipal district.
