= Dyurtyuli (inhabited locality) =

Dyurtyuli (Russian: Дюртюли) is the name of several inhabited localities in the Republic of Bashkortostan, Russia.

Urban localities

- Dyurtyuli, a town; administratively incorporated as a town of republic significance

Rural localities

- Dyurtyuli, Aurgazinsky District, Republic of Bashkortostan, a village in Novokalchirovsky Selsoviet of Aurgazinsky District
- Dyurtyuli, Davlekanovsky District, Republic of Bashkortostan, a selo in Kurmankeyevsky Selsoviet of Davlekanovsky District
- Dyurtyuli, Karaidelsky District, Republic of Bashkortostan, a village in Novoberdyashsky Selsoviet of Karaidelsky District
- Dyurtyuli, Sharansky District, Republic of Bashkortostan, a selo in Dyurtyulinsky Selsoviet of Sharansky District
