= Imchag =

Imchag Имчаг
- Village
- Location within Bashkortostan Location within Russia
- Coordinates: 54°58′N 53°59′E
- Country: Russia
- Region: Bashkortostan
- District: Sharansky District
- Time zone: UTC+5:00

Imchag (Russian: Имчаг; Bashkir: Имсәк, İmsäk) is a rural locality (a village) in Pisarevsky Selsoviet, Sharansky District, Bashkortostan, Russia. The population was 9 as of 2010. There is 1 street.

== Geography ==
Imchag is located 28 km north of Sharan (the district's administrative centre) by road. Pisarevo is the nearest rural locality.
