= Novoalexandrovka, Sharansky District, Republic of Bashkortostan =

Novoalexandrovka Новоалександровка
- Village
- Location within Bashkortostan Location within Russia
- Coordinates: 54°58′N 54°04′E
- Country: Russia
- Region: Bashkortostan
- District: Sharansky District
- Time zone: UTC+5:00

Novoalexandrovka (Russian: Новоалександровка) is a rural locality (a village) in Pisarevsky Selsoviet, Sharansky District, Bashkortostan, Russia. The population was 11 as of 2010. There is 1 street.

== Geography ==
Novoalexandrovka is located 33 km north of Sharan (the district's administrative centre) by road. Novoknyazevo is the nearest rural locality.
