= Karanbash =

Karanbash Каранбаш
- Village
- Location within Bashkortostan Location within Russia
- Coordinates: 54°32′N 54°19′E
- Country: Russia
- Region: Bashkortostan
- District: Buzdyaksky District
- Time zone: UTC+5:00

Karanbash (Russian: Каранбаш; Bashkir: Ҡаранбаш, Qaranbaş) is a rural locality (a village) in Kopey-Kubovsky Selsoviet, Buzdyaksky District, Bashkortostan, Russia. The population was 49 as of 2010. There are 2 streets in total.

== Geography ==
Karanbash is located 22 km west of Buzdyak (the district's administrative centre) by road. Kopey-Kubovo is the nearest rural locality.
