= Yeremkino =

Yeremkino Еремкино
- Selo
- Location within Bashkortostan Location within Russia
- Coordinates: 54°45′N 53°45′E
- Country: Russia
- Region: Bashkortostan
- District: Sharansky District
- Time zone: UTC+5:00

Yeremkino (Russian: Еремкино; Bashkir: Йәрәмкә, Yärämkä) is a rural locality (a selo) in Dyurtyulinsky Selsoviet, Sharansky District, Bashkortostan, Russia. The population was 292 as of 2010. There are 5 streets.

== Geography ==
Yeremkino is located 23 km southwest of Sharan (the district's administrative centre) by road. Dyurtyuli is the nearest rural locality.
