= Sharbash =

Sharbash Шарбаш
- Village
- Location within Bashkortostan Location within Russia
- Coordinates: 54°45′N 54°31′E
- Country: Russia
- Region: Bashkortostan
- District: Buzdyaksky District
- Time zone: UTC+5:00

Sharbash (Russian: Шарбаш; Bashkir: Шарбаш, Şarbaş) is a rural locality (a village) in Kilimovsky Selsoviet, Buzdyaksky District, Bashkortostan, Russia. The population was 120 as of 2010. There is 1 street.

== Geography ==
Sharbash is located 25 km north of Buzdyak (the district's administrative centre) by road. Volodarskoye is the nearest rural locality.
