= Novotavlarovo, Sharansky District, Republic of Bashkortostan =

Novotavlarovo Новотавларово
- Village
- Location within Bashkortostan Location within Russia
- Coordinates: 54°53′N 54°11′E
- Country: Russia
- Region: Bashkortostan
- District: Sharansky District
- Time zone: UTC+5:00

Novotavlarovo (Russian: Новотавларово; Bashkir: Яңы Таулар, Yañı Tawlar) is a rural locality (a village) in Akbarisovsky Selsoviet, Sharansky District, Bashkortostan, Russia. The population was 219 as of 2010. There are 2 streets.

== Geography ==
Novotavlarovo is located 15 km northeast of Sharan (the district's administrative centre) by road. Akbarisovo is the nearest rural locality.
