= Isametovo, Sharansky District, Republic of Bashkortostan =

Isametovo Исаметово
- Village
- Location within Bashkortostan Location within Russia
- Coordinates: 54°48′N 53°54′E
- Country: Russia
- Region: Bashkortostan
- District: Sharansky District
- Time zone: UTC+5:00

Isametovo (Russian: Исаметово; Bashkir: Исәмәт, İsämät) is a rural locality (a village) in Dmitriyevo-Polyansky Selsoviet, Sharansky District, Bashkortostan, Russia. The population was 2 as of 2010. There is 1 street.

== Geography ==
Isametovo is located 17 km west of Sharan (the district's administrative centre) by road. Karakulka is the nearest rural locality.
