= Yulduzly =

Yulduzly Юлдузлы
- Village
- Location within Bashkortostan Location within Russia
- Coordinates: 54°36′N 54°19′E
- Country: Russia
- Region: Bashkortostan
- District: Buzdyaksky District
- Time zone: UTC+5:00

Yulduzly (Russian: Юлдузлы; Bashkir: Йондоҙло, Yondoźlo) is a rural locality (a village) in Arslanovsky Selsoviet, Buzdyaksky District, Bashkortostan, Russia. The population was 129 as of 2010. There is 1 street.

== Geography ==
Yulduzly is located 24 km northwest of Buzdyak (the district's administrative centre) by road. Ishtiryak is the nearest rural locality.
