= Yardam =

Yardam Ярдам
- Village
- Location within Bashkortostan Location within Russia
- Coordinates: 54°55′N 54°39′E
- Country: Russia
- Region: Bashkortostan
- District: Buzdyaksky District
- Time zone: UTC+5:00

Yardam (Russian: Ярдам; Bashkir: Ярҙам, Yarźam) is a rural locality (a village) in Kuzeyevsky Selsoviet, Buzdyaksky District, Bashkortostan, Russia. The population was 10 as of 2010. There is 1 street.

== Geography ==
Yardam is located 46 km north of Buzdyak (the district's administrative centre) by road. Chishma is the nearest rural locality.
