= Bulansaz =

Bulansaz Булансаз
- Village
- Location within Bashkortostan Location within Russia
- Coordinates: 54°56′N 54°07′E
- Country: Russia
- Region: Bashkortostan
- District: Sharansky District
- Time zone: UTC+5:00

Bulansaz (Russian: Булансаз; Bashkir: Боланһаҙ, Bolanhaź) is a rural locality (a village) in Michurinsky Selsoviet, Sharansky District, Bashkortostan, Russia. The population was 104 as of 2010. There are 2 streets.

== Geography ==
Bulansaz is located 16 km northeast of Sharan (the district's administrative centre) by road. Michurinsk is the nearest rural locality.
