= Novotavlarovo =

Novotavlarovo Новотавларово
- Village
- Location within Bashkortostan Location within Russia
- Coordinates: 54°49′N 54°20′E
- Country: Russia
- Region: Bashkortostan
- District: Buzdyaksky District
- Time zone: UTC+5:00

Novotavlarovo (Russian: Новотавларово; Bashkir: Яңы Таулар, Yañı Tawlar) is a rural locality (a village) in Tavlarovsky Selsoviet, Buzdyaksky District, Bashkortostan, Russia. The population was 269 as of 2010. There are 2 streets.

== Geography ==
Novotavlarovo is located 41 km northwest of Buzdyak (the district's administrative centre) by road. Starotavlarovo is the nearest rural locality.
