= Kagarchi-Bulyak =

Kagarchi-Bulyak Кугарчи-Буляк
- Selo
- Location within Bashkortostan Location within Russia
- Coordinates: 54°53′N 53°41′E
- Country: Russia
- Region: Bashkortostan
- District: Sharansky District
- Time zone: UTC+5:00

Kagarchi-Bulyak (Russian: Кугарчи-Буляк; Bashkir: Күгәрсен-Бүләк, Kügärsen-Büläk) is a rural locality (a selo) in Nizhnezaitovsky Selsoviet, Sharansky District, Bashkortostan, Russia. The population was 200 as of 2010. There are 2 streets.

== Geography ==
Kagarchi-Bulyak is located 36 km northwest of Sharan (the district's administrative centre) by road. Bukhara is the nearest rural locality.
