= Zagornye Kletya =

Zagornye Kletya Загорные Клетья
- Village
- Location within Bashkortostan Location within Russia
- Coordinates: 54°52′N 53°49′E
- Country: Russia
- Region: Bashkortostan
- District: Sharansky District
- Time zone: UTC+5:00

Zagornye Kletya (Russian: Загорные Клетья) is a rural locality (a village) in Dmitriyevo-Polyansky Selsoviet, Sharansky District, Bashkortostan, Russia. The population was 94 as of 2010. There are 3 streets.

== Geography ==
Zagornye Kletya is located 19 km northwest of Sharan (the district's administrative centre) by road. Istochnik is the nearest rural locality.
