= Novobaykiyevo =

Novobaykiyevo Новобайкиево
- Village
- Location within Bashkortostan Location within Russia
- Coordinates: 54°59′N 54°14′E
- Country: Russia
- Region: Bashkortostan
- District: Sharansky District
- Time zone: UTC+5:00

Novobaykiyevo (Russian: Новобайкиево; Bashkir: Яңы Бәйки, Yañı Bäyki) is a rural locality (a village) in Michurinsky Selsoviet, Sharansky District, Bashkortostan, Russia. The population was 38 as of 2010. There is 1 street.

== Geography ==
Novobaykiyevo is located 28 km northeast of Sharan (the district's administrative centre) by road. Novobaygildino is the nearest rural locality.
