= Novotumbagushevo =

Novotumbagushevo Новотумбагушево
- Village
- Location within Bashkortostan Location within Russia
- Coordinates: 54°53′N 54°00′E
- Country: Russia
- Region: Bashkortostan
- District: Sharansky District
- Time zone: UTC+5:00

Novotumbagushevo (Russian: Новотумбагушево; Bashkir: Яңы Томбағош, Yañı Tombağoş) is a rural locality (a village) in Starotumbagushevsky Selsoviet, Sharansky District, Bashkortostan, Russia. The population was 136 as of 2010. There is 1 street.

== Geography ==
Novotumbagushevo is located 10 km north of Sharan (the district's administrative centre) by road. Starotumbagushevo is the nearest rural locality.
