= Tugayevo =

Tugayevo Тугаево
- Selo
- Location within Bashkortostan Location within Russia
- Coordinates: 54°52′N 54°22′E
- Country: Russia
- Region: Bashkortostan
- District: Buzdyaksky District
- Time zone: UTC+5:00

Tugayevo (Russian: Тугаево; Bashkir: Туғай, Tuğay) is a rural locality (a selo) in Sabayevsky Selsoviet, Buzdyaksky District, Bashkortostan, Russia. As of 2010, the population was 300. It has three streets.

== Geography ==
Tugayevo is located 42 km north of Buzdyak (the district's administrative centre) by road. The nearest rural locality is Idyashbash.
