= Usmanovsky =

Usmanovsky Усмановский
- Village
- Location within Bashkortostan Location within Russia
- Coordinates: 54°49′N 54°42′E
- Country: Russia
- Region: Bashkortostan
- District: Buzdyaksky District
- Time zone: UTC+5:00

Usmanovsky (Russian: Усмановский; Bashkir: Уҫман, Uśman) is a rural locality (a village) in Kuzeyevsky Selsoviet, Buzdyaksky District, Bashkortostan, Russia. The population was 103 as of 2010. There is 1 street.

== Geography ==
Usmanovsky is located 48 km north of Buzdyak (the district's administrative centre) by road. Akhun is the nearest rural locality.
