= Staryye Bogady =

Staryye Bogady Старые Богады
- Selo
- Location within Bashkortostan Location within Russia
- Coordinates: 54°38′N 54°27′E
- Country: Russia
- Region: Bashkortostan
- District: Buzdyaksky District
- Time zone: UTC+5:00

Staryye Bogady (Russian: Старые Богады; Bashkir: Иҫке Боғаҙы, İśke Boğaźı) is a rural locality (a selo) and the administrative centre of Arslanovsky Selsoviet, Buzdyaksky District, Bashkortostan, Russia. The population was 547 as of 2010. There are six streets.

== Geography ==
Staryye Bogady is located 15 km northwest of Buzdyak (the district's administrative centre) by road. Arslanovo is the nearest rural locality.
