= Yemmetovo =

Yemmetovo Емметово
- Selo
- Location within Bashkortostan Location within Russia
- Coordinates: 54°45′N 54°14′E
- Country: Russia
- Region: Bashkortostan
- District: Sharansky District
- Time zone: UTC+5:00

Yemmetovo (Russian: Емметово; Bashkir: Йәммәт, Yämmät) is a rural locality (a selo) in Nureyevsky Selsoviet, Sharansky District, Bashkortostan, Russia. The population was 397 as of 2010. There are 3 streets.

== Geography ==
Yemmetovo is located 31 km southeast of Sharan (the district's administrative centre) by road. Tugaryak is the nearest rural locality.
