= Kanly-Turkeyevo =

Kanly-Turkeyevo Канлы-Туркеево
- Selo
- Location within Bashkortostan Location within Russia
- Coordinates: 54°22′N 54°26′E
- Country: Russia
- Region: Bashkortostan
- District: Buzdyaksky District
- Time zone: UTC+5:00

Kanly-Turkeyevo (Russian: Канлы-Туркеево; Bashkir: Ҡаңны-Төркәй, Qañnı-Törkäy) is a rural locality (a selo) and the administrative centre of Kanly-Turkeyevsky Selsoviet, Buzdyaksky District, Bashkortostan, Russia. The population was 878 as of 2010. There are 6 streets.

== Geography ==
Kanly-Turkeyevo is located 29 km southwest of Buzdyak (the district's administrative centre) by road. Kuzminka is the nearest rural locality.
