= Istochnik =

Istochnik Источник
- Village
- Location within Bashkortostan Location within Russia
- Coordinates: 54°53′N 53°50′E
- Country: Russia
- Region: Bashkortostan
- District: Sharansky District
- Time zone: UTC+5:00

Istochnik (Russian: Источник) is a rural locality (a village) in Dmitriyevo-Polyansky Selsoviet, Sharansky District, Bashkortostan, Russia. The population was 228 as of 2010. There are 6 streets.

== Geography ==
Istochnik is located 16 km northwest of Sharan (the district's administrative centre) by road. Zagornye Kletya is the nearest rural locality.
