= Khaziman =

Khaziman Хазиман
- Village
- Location within Bashkortostan Location within Russia
- Coordinates: 54°53′N 54°24′E
- Country: Russia
- Region: Bashkortostan
- District: Buzdyaksky District
- Time zone: UTC+5:00

Khaziman (Russian: Хазиман; Bashkir: Хажиман, Xajiman) is a rural locality (a village) in Sabayevsky Selsoviet, Buzdyaksky District, Bashkortostan, Russia. The population was 45 as of 2010. There are 2 streets.

== Geography ==
Khaziman is located 43 km north of Buzdyak (the district's administrative centre) by road. Novy Shigay is the nearest rural locality.
