= Novy Kichkinyash =

Novy Kichkinyash Новый Кичкиняш
- Village
- Location within Bashkortostan Location within Russia
- Coordinates: 54°53′N 54°02′E
- Country: Russia
- Region: Bashkortostan
- District: Sharansky District
- Time zone: UTC+5:00

Novy Kichkinyash (Russian: Новый Кичкиняш; Bashkir: Яңы Кескенәш, Yañı Keskenäş) is a rural locality (a village) in Starotumbagushevsky Selsoviet, Sharansky District, Bashkortostan, Russia. The population was 39 as of 2010. There is 1 street.

== Geography ==
Novy Kichkinyash is located 13 km north of Sharan (the district's administrative centre) by road. Stary Kichkinyash is the nearest rural locality.
