= Yuraktau, Buzdyaksky District, Republic of Bashkortostan =

Yuraktau Юрактау
- Village
- Location within Bashkortostan Location within Russia
- Coordinates: 54°40′N 54°36′E
- Country: Russia
- Region: Bashkortostan
- District: Buzdyaksky District
- Time zone: UTC+5:00

Yuraktau (Russian: Юрактау; Bashkir: Йөрәктау, Yäräktaw) is a rural locality (a village) in Karansky Selsoviet, Buzdyaksky District, Bashkortostan, Russia. The population was 28 as of 2010. There is 1 street.

== Geography ==
Yuraktau is located 19 km northeast of Buzdyak (the district's administrative centre) by road. Amirovo is the nearest rural locality.
