= Uyalovo =

Uyalovo Уялово
- Village
- Location within Bashkortostan Location within Russia
- Coordinates: 54°50′N 54°07′E
- Country: Russia
- Region: Bashkortostan
- District: Sharansky District
- Time zone: UTC+5:00

Uyalovo (Russian: Уялово; Bashkir: Уял, Uyal) is a rural locality (a village) in Akbarisovsky Selsoviet, Sharansky District, Bashkortostan, Russia. The population was 159 as of 2010. There are 3 streets.

== Geography ==
Uyalovo is located 9 km northeast of Sharan (the district's administrative centre) by road. Ursayevo is the nearest rural locality.
