= Tashlykul, Buzdyaksky District, Republic of Bashkortostan =

Tashlykul Ташлыкуль
- Selo
- Location within Bashkortostan Location within Russia
- Coordinates: 54°30′N 54°32′E
- Country: Russia
- Region: Bashkortostan
- District: Buzdyaksky District
- Time zone: UTC+5:00

Tashlykul (Russian: Ташлыкуль; Bashkir: Ташлыкүл, Taşlıkül) is a rural locality (a selo) in Gafuriysky Selsoviet, Buzdyaksky District, Bashkortostan, Russia. The population was 318 as of 2010. There are 3 streets.

== Geography ==
Tashlykul is located 8 km south of Buzdyak (the district's administrative centre) by road. Voznesenka is the nearest rural locality.
