= Starye Tlyavli =

Starye Tlyavli Старые Тлявли
- Village
- Location within Bashkortostan Location within Russia
- Coordinates: 54°45′N 54°08′E
- Country: Russia
- Region: Bashkortostan
- District: Sharansky District
- Time zone: UTC+5:00

Starye Tlyavli (Russian: Старые Тлявли; Bashkir: Иҫке Теләүле, İśke Teläwle) is a rural locality (a village) in Bazgiyevsky Selsoviet, Sharansky District, Bashkortostan, Russia. The population was 267 as of 2010. There are 3 streets.

== Geography ==
Starye Tlyavli is located 20 km southeast of Sharan (the district's administrative centre) by road. Kir-Tlyavli is the nearest rural locality.
