= Kubyak =

Kubyak Кубяк
- Selo
- Location within Bashkortostan Location within Russia
- Coordinates: 54°49′N 54°25′E
- Country: Russia
- Region: Bashkortostan
- District: Buzdyaksky District
- Time zone: UTC+5:00

Kubyak (Russian: Кубяк; Bashkir: Көбәк, Köbäk) is a rural locality (a selo) in Tavlarovsky Selsoviet, Buzdyaksky District, Bashkortostan, Russia. The population was 338 as of 2010. There are 6 streets.

== Geography ==
Kubyak is located 36 km north of Buzdyak (the district's administrative centre) by road. Starotavlarovo is the nearest rural locality.
