= Karazybash =

Karazybash Каразыбаш
- Village
- Location within Bashkortostan Location within Russia
- Coordinates: 54°51′N 54°02′E
- Country: Russia
- Region: Bashkortostan
- District: Sharansky District
- Time zone: UTC+5:00

Karazybash (Russian: Каразыбаш; Bashkir: Ҡараҙыбаш, Qaraźıbaş) is a rural locality (a village) in Starotumbagushevsky Selsoviet, Sharansky District, Bashkortostan, Russia. The population was 74 as of 2010. There are 2 streets.

== Geography ==
Karazybash is located 5 km northeast of Sharan (the district's administrative centre) by road. Starotumbagushevo is the nearest rural locality.
