= Derevnya Khozyaystva Zagotskota =

Derevnya Khozyaystva Zagotskota Деревня Хозяйства Заготскота
- Village
- Location within Bashkortostan Location within Russia
- Coordinates: 54°38′N 54°39′E
- Country: Russia
- Region: Bashkortostan
- District: Buzdyaksky District
- Time zone: UTC+5:00

Derevnya Khozyaystva Zagotskota (Russian: Деревня Хозяйства Заготскота; Bashkir: Заготскот Хужалығы, Zagotskot Xujalığı) is a rural locality (a village) in Buzdyaksky Selsoviet, Buzdyaksky District, Bashkortostan, Russia. The population was 116 as of 2010. There are 2 streets. It is located within the Yekaterinburg Time Zone (GMT+5).

== Geography ==
The village is located 19 km northeast of Buzdyak (the district's administrative centre) by road. Staroamirovo is the nearest rural locality.
