= Biktyshevo =

Biktyshevo Биктышево
- Selo
- Location within Bashkortostan Location within Russia
- Coordinates: 54°52′N 54°09′E
- Country: Russia
- Region: Bashkortostan
- District: Sharansky District
- Time zone: UTC+5:00

Biktyshevo (Russian: Биктышево; Bashkir: Биктыш, Biktış) is a rural locality (a selo) in Akbarisovsky Selsoviet, Sharansky District, Bashkortostan, Russia. The population was 124 as of 2010. There are 2 streets.

== Geography ==
Biktyshevo is located 13 km northeast of Sharan (the district's administrative centre) by road. Bikkulovo is the nearest rural locality.
