= Bayrash =

Bayrash Байраш
- Village
- Location within Bashkortostan Location within Russia
- Coordinates: 54°41′N 54°30′E
- Country: Russia
- Region: Bashkortostan
- District: Buzdyaksky District
- Time zone: UTC+5:00

Bayrash (Russian: Байраш; Bashkir: Байраш, Bayraş) is a rural locality (a village) in Karansky Selsoviet, Buzdyaksky District, Bashkortostan, Russia. The population was 106 as of 2010. There are 3 streets.

== Geography ==
Bayrash is located 17 km north of Buzdyak (the district's administrative centre) by road. Karan is the nearest rural locality.
