= Selo Saraygirovskogo otdeleniya Urtakulskogo sovkhoza =

Selo Saraygirovskogo otdeleniya Urtakulskogo sovkhoza Село Сарайгировского отделения Уртакульского совхоза
- Selo
- Location within Bashkortostan Location within Russia
- Coordinates: 54°27′N 54°27′E
- Country: Russia
- Region: Bashkortostan
- District: Buzdyaksky District
- Time zone: UTC+5:00

Selo Saraygirovskogo otdeleniya Urtakulskogo sovkhoza (Russian: Село Сарайгировского отделения Уртакульского совхоза; Bashkir: Уртакүл совхозының Һарайғыр бүлексәһе ауылы, Urtakül sovxozınıñ Harayğır büleksähe awılı) is a rural locality (a selo) in Urtakulsky Selsoviet, Buzdyaksky District, Bashkortostan, Russia. The population was 213 as of 2010. There are 3 streets.

== Geography ==
It is located 11 km north of Buzdyak (the district's administrative centre) by road.
