= Yelan-Yelga =

Yelan-Yelga Елань-Елга
- Village
- Location within Bashkortostan Location within Russia
- Coordinates: 54°55′N 54°02′E
- Country: Russia
- Region: Bashkortostan
- District: Sharansky District
- Time zone: UTC+5:00

Yelan-Yelga (Russian: Елань-Елга; Bashkir: Йыланйылға, Yılanyılğa) is a rural locality (a village) in Starotumbagushevsky Selsoviet, Sharansky District, Bashkortostan, Russia. The population was 26 as of 2010. There is 1 street.

== Geography ==
Yelan-Yelga is located 14 km north of Sharan (the district's administrative centre) by road. Temyakovo is the nearest rural locality.
