= Stary Kichkinyash =

Stary Kichkinyash Старый Кичкиняш
- Village
- Location within Bashkortostan Location within Russia
- Coordinates: 54°54′N 54°04′E
- Country: Russia
- Region: Bashkortostan
- District: Sharansky District
- Time zone: UTC+5:00

Stary Kichkinyash (Russian: Старый Кичкиняш; Bashkir: Иҫке Кескенәш, İśke Keskenäş) is a rural locality (a village) in Starotumbagushevsky Selsoviet, Sharansky District, Bashkortostan, Russia. The population was 103 as of 2010. There is 1 street.

== Geography ==
Stary Kichkinyash is located 13 km northeast of Sharan (the district's administrative centre) by road. Novy Kichkinyash is the nearest rural locality.
