= Yangaulovo =

Yangaulovo Янгаулово
- Selo
- Location within Bashkortostan Location within Russia
- Coordinates: 54°53′N 54°13′E
- Country: Russia
- Region: Bashkortostan
- District: Sharansky District
- Time zone: UTC+5:00

Yangaulovo (Russian: Янгаулово; Bashkir: Яңауыл, Yañawıl) is a rural locality (a selo) in Akbarisovsky Selsoviet, Sharansky District, Bashkortostan, Russia. The population was 204 as of 2010. There are 2 street.

== Geography ==
Yangaulovo is located 19 km northeast of Sharan (the district's administrative centre) by road. Novotavlarovo is the nearest rural locality.
