= Papanovka =

Papanovka Папановка
- Village
- Location within Bashkortostan Location within Russia
- Coordinates: 55°00′N 54°13′E
- Country: Russia
- Region: Bashkortostan
- District: Sharansky District
- Time zone: UTC+5:00

Papanovka (Russian: Папановка) is a rural locality (a village) in Michurinsky Selsoviet, Sharansky District, Bashkortostan, Russia. The population was 90 as of 2010. There are 3 streets.

== Geography ==
Papanovka is located 30 km northeast of Sharan (the district's administrative centre) by road. Sokolovka is the nearest rural locality.
