= Yelanchikbash =

Yelanchikbash Еланчикбаш
- Village
- Location within Bashkortostan Location within Russia
- Coordinates: 54°58′N 54°13′E
- Country: Russia
- Region: Bashkortostan
- District: Sharansky District
- Time zone: UTC+5:00

Yelanchikbash (Russian: Еланчикбаш; Bashkir: Йылансыҡбаш, Yılansıqbaş) is a rural locality (a village) in Michurinsky Selsoviet, Sharansky District, Bashkortostan, Russia. The population was 58 as of 2010. There is 1 street.

== Geography ==
Yelanchikbash is located 24 km northeast of Sharan (the district's administrative centre) by road. Novoyumashevo is the nearest rural locality.
