= Tarkhan, Republic of Bashkortostan =

Tarkhan Тархан
- Village
- Location within Bashkortostan Location within Russia
- Coordinates: 54°45′N 54°02′E
- Country: Russia
- Region: Bashkortostan
- District: Sharansky District
- Time zone: UTC+5:00

Tarkhan (Russian: Тархан; Bashkir: Тархан, Tarxan) is a rural locality (a village) in Sharansky Selsoviet, Sharansky District, Bashkortostan, Russia. The population was 14 as of 2010. There are 5 streets.

== Geography ==
Tarkhan is located 13 km southeast of Sharan (the district's administrative centre) by road. Stary Tamyan is the nearest rural locality.
