= Kurtutel =

Kurtutel Куртутель
- Village
- Location within Bashkortostan Location within Russia
- Coordinates: 54°53′N 53°46′E
- Country: Russia
- Region: Bashkortostan
- District: Sharansky District
- Time zone: UTC+5:00

Kurtutel (Russian: Куртутель; Bashkir: Ҡыртүтәл, Qırtütäl) is a rural locality (a village) in Ziriklinsky Selsoviet, Sharansky District, Bashkortostan, Russia. The population was 176 as of 2010. There are 2 streets.

== Geography ==
Kurtutel is located 27 km northwest of Sharan (the district's administrative centre) by road. Tallykul is the nearest rural locality.
