= Kazaklar-Kubovo =

Kazaklar-Kubovo Казаклар-Кубово
- Selo
- Location within Bashkortostan Location within Russia
- Coordinates: 54°27′N 54°19′E
- Country: Russia
- Region: Bashkortostan
- District: Buzdyaksky District
- Time zone: UTC+5:00

Kazaklar-Kubovo (Russian: Казаклар-Кубово; Bashkir: Ҡаҙаҡлар-Ҡобау, Qaźaqlar-Qobaw) is a rural locality (a selo) in Kopey-Kubovsky Selsoviet, Buzdyaksky District, Bashkortostan, Russia. The population was 240 as of 2010. There are 5 streets.

== Geography ==
Kazaklar-Kubovo is located 23 km southwest of Buzdyak (the district's administrative centre) by road. Batyrsha-Kubovo is the nearest rural locality.
