= Sharlykbash =

Sharlykbash Шарлыкбаш
- Village
- Location within Bashkortostan Location within Russia
- Coordinates: 54°49′N 53°45′E
- Country: Russia
- Region: Bashkortostan
- District: Sharansky District
- Time zone: UTC+5:00

Sharlykbash (Russian: Шарлыкбаш; Bashkir: Шарлыҡбаш, Şarlıqbaş) is a rural locality (a village) in Ziriklinsky Selsoviet, Sharansky District, Bashkortostan, Russia. The population was 75 as of 2010. There is 1 street.

== Geography ==
Sharlykbash is located 22 km west of Sharan (the district's administrative centre) by road. Zirikly is the nearest rural locality.
