= Yenakhmetovo =

Yenakhmetovo Енахметово
- Selo
- Location within Bashkortostan Location within Russia
- Coordinates: 54°49′N 54°13′E
- Country: Russia
- Region: Bashkortostan
- District: Sharansky District
- Time zone: UTC+5:00

Yenakhmetovo (Russian: Енахметово; Bashkir: Йәнәхмәт, Yänäxmät) is a rural locality (a selo) in Nureyevsky Selsoviet, Sharansky District, Bashkortostan, Russia. The population was 416 as of 2010. There are 4 streets.

== Geography ==
Yenakhmetovo is located 32 km east of Sharan (the district's administrative centre) by road. Bakhcha is the nearest rural locality.
