= Kiska-Yelga =

Kiska-Yelga Киска-Елга
- Selo
- Location within Bashkortostan Location within Russia
- Coordinates: 54°32′N 54°28′E
- Country: Russia
- Region: Bashkortostan
- District: Buzdyaksky District
- Time zone: UTC+5:00

Kiska-Yelga (Russian: Киска-Елга; Bashkir: Ҡыҫҡайылға, Qıśqayılğa) is a rural locality (a selo) in Urtakulsky Selsoviet, Buzdyaksky District, Bashkortostan, Russia. The population was 509 as of 2010. There are 8 streets.

== Geography ==
Kiska-Yelga is located 8 km southwest of Buzdyak (the district's administrative centre) by road. Buzdyak is the nearest rural locality.
