= Sabanayevo =

Sabanayevo Сабанаево
- Selo
- Location within Bashkortostan Location within Russia
- Coordinates: 54°44′N 54°28′E
- Country: Russia
- Region: Bashkortostan
- District: Buzdyaksky District
- Time zone: UTC+5:00

Sabanayevo (Russian: Сабанаево; Bashkir: Сабанай, Sabanay) is a rural locality (a selo) in Karansky Selsoviet, Buzdyaksky District, Bashkortostan, Russia. The population was 188 as of 2010. There are 3 streets.

== Geography ==
Sabanayevo is located 25 km north of Buzdyak (the district's administrative centre) by road. Staroaktau is the nearest rural locality.
