= Akbarisovo =

Akbarisovo Акбарисово
- Selo
- Location within Bashkortostan Location within Russia
- Coordinates: 54°51′N 54°11′E
- Country: Russia
- Region: Bashkortostan
- District: Sharansky District
- Time zone: UTC+5:00

Akbarisovo (Russian: Акбарисово; Bashkir: Акбарыҫ, Aqbarıś) is a rural locality (a selo) and the administrative centre of Akbarisovsky Selsoviet, Sharansky District, Bashkortostan, Russia. The population was 437 as of 2010. There are 6 streets.

== Geography ==
Akbarisovo is located 18 km northeast of Sharan (the district's administrative centre) by road. Novotavlarovo is the nearest rural locality.
