= Meshcherovo =

Meshcherovo Мещерево
- Village
- Location within Bashkortostan Location within Russia
- Coordinates: 54°49′N 54°05′E
- Country: Russia
- Region: Bashkortostan
- District: Sharansky District
- Time zone: UTC+5:00

Meshcherovo (Russian: Мещерево; Bashkir: Мишәр, Mişär) is a rural locality (a village) in Akbarisovsky Selsoviet, Sharansky District, Bashkortostan, Russia. The population was 179 as of 2010. There are 2 streets.

== Geography ==
Meshcherovo is located 9 km north of Sharan (the district's administrative centre) by road.
