= Chupayevo =

Chupayevo Чупаево
- Selo
- Location within Bashkortostan Location within Russia
- Coordinates: 54°48′N 54°04′E
- Country: Russia
- Region: Bashkortostan
- District: Sharansky District
- Time zone: UTC+5:00

Chupayevo (Russian: Чупаево; Bashkir: Супай, Supay) is a rural locality (a selo) in Akbarisovsky Selsoviet, Sharansky District, Bashkortostan, Russia. The population was 176 as of 2010. There are 5 street.

== Geography ==
Chupayevo is located 9 km southeast of Sharan (the district's administrative centre) by road. Meshcherevo is the nearest rural locality.
