= Roshcha, Sharansky District, Republic of Bashkortostan =

Roshcha Роща
- Village
- Location within Bashkortostan Location within Russia
- Coordinates: 54°57′N 53°54′E
- Country: Russia
- Region: Bashkortostan
- District: Sharansky District
- Time zone: UTC+5:00

Roshcha (Russian: Роща) is a rural locality (a village) in Pisarevsky Selsoviet, Sharansky District, Bashkortostan, Russia. The population was 14 as of 2010. There is 1 street.

== Geography ==
Roshcha is located 20 km north of Sharan (the district's administrative centre) by road. Pisarevo is the nearest rural locality.
