= Nizhniye Tashly =

Nizhniye Tashly Нижние Ташлы
- Selo
- Location within Bashkortostan Location within Russia
- Coordinates: 54°55′N 53°45′E
- Country: Russia
- Region: Bashkortostan
- District: Sharansky District
- Time zone: UTC+5:00

Nizhniye Tashly (Russian: Нижние Ташлы; Bashkir: Түбәнге Ташлы, Tübänge Taşlı) is a rural locality (a selo) and the administrative centre of Nizhnetashlinsky Selsoviet, Sharansky District, Bashkortostan, Russia. The population was 443 as of 2010. There are 5 streets.

== Geography ==
Nizhniye Tashly is located 32 km northwest of Sharan (the district's administrative centre) by road. Verkhniye Tashly is the nearest rural locality.
