= Kir-Tlyavli =

Kir-Tlyavli Кир-Тлявли
- Selo
- Location within Bashkortostan Location within Russia
- Coordinates: 54°45′N 54°08′E
- Country: Russia
- Region: Bashkortostan
- District: Sharansky District
- Time zone: UTC+5:00

Kir-Tlyavli (Russian: Кир-Тлявли; Bashkir: Ҡыр-Теләүле, Qır-Teläwle) is a rural locality (a selo) in Bazgiyevsky Selsoviet, Sharansky District, Bashkortostan, Russia. The population was 190 as of 2010. There is 1 street.

== Geography ==
Kir-Tlyavli is located 21 km southeast of Sharan (the district's administrative centre) by road. Starye Tlyavli is the nearest rural locality.
