= Shaltykbashevo =

Shaltykbashevo Шалтыкбашево
- Village
- Location within Bashkortostan Location within Russia
- Coordinates: 54°53′N 54°17′E
- Country: Russia
- Region: Bashkortostan
- District: Sharansky District
- Time zone: UTC+5:00

Shaltykbashevo (Russian: Шалтыкбашево; Bashkir: Шалтыҡбаш, Şaltıqbaş) is a rural locality (a village) in Akbarisovsky Selsoviet, Sharansky District, Bashkortostan, Russia. The population was 8 as of 2010. There is 1 street.

== Geography ==
Shaltykbashevo is located 23 km northeast of Sharan (the district's administrative centre) by road. Yangaulovo is the nearest rural locality.
