= Novy Tamyan =

Novy Tamyan Новый Тамьян
- Village
- Location within Bashkortostan Location within Russia
- Coordinates: 54°43′N 54°05′E
- Country: Russia
- Region: Bashkortostan
- District: Sharansky District
- Time zone: UTC+5:00

Novy Tamyan (Russian: Новый Тамьян; Bashkir: Яңы Тамъян, Yañı Tamyan) is a rural locality (a village) in Bazgiyevsky Selsoviet, Sharansky District, Bashkortostan, Russia. The population was 173 as of 2010. There is 1 street.

== Geography ==
Novy Tamyan is located 17 km southeast of Sharan (the district's administrative centre) by road. Bazgiyevo is the nearest rural locality.
