= Kiyazibash =

Kiyazibash Киязибаш
- Village
- Location within Bashkortostan Location within Russia
- Coordinates: 54°42′N 54°17′E
- Country: Russia
- Region: Bashkortostan
- District: Buzdyaksky District
- Time zone: UTC+5:00

Kiyazibash (Russian: Киязибаш; Bashkir: Киәҙебаш, Kiäźebaş) is a rural locality (a village) in Arslanovsky Selsoviet, Buzdyaksky District, Bashkortostan, Russia. The population was 24 as of 2010. There is 1 street.

== Geography ==
Kiyazibash is located 33 km northwest of Buzdyak (the district's administrative centre) by road. Kyzyl-Yelga is the nearest rural locality.
