= Amirovo, Buzdyaksky District, Republic of Bashkortostan =

Amirovo Амирово
- Selo
- Location within Bashkortostan Location within Russia
- Coordinates: 54°41′N 54°33′E
- Country: Russia
- Region: Bashkortostan
- District: Buzdyaksky District
- Time zone: UTC+5:00

Amirovo (Russian: Амирово; Bashkir: Әмир, Ämir) is a rural locality (a selo) in Karansky Selsoviet, Buzdyaksky District, Bashkortostan, Russia. The population was 482 as of 2010. There are 7 streets.

== Geography ==
Amirovo is located 14 km north of Buzdyak (the district's administrative centre) by road. Ishmenevo is the nearest rural locality.
