= Ukiyaz =

Ukiyaz Укияз
- Village
- Location within Bashkortostan Location within Russia
- Coordinates: 54°46′N 53°46′E
- Country: Russia
- Region: Bashkortostan
- District: Sharansky District
- Time zone: UTC+5:00

Ukiyaz (Russian: Укияз; Bashkir: Уҡыяҙ, Uqıyaź) is a rural locality (a village) in Dyurtyulinsky Selsoviet, Sharansky District, Bashkortostan, Russia. The population was 13 as of 2010. There is 1 street.

== Geography ==
Ukiyaz is located 21 km southwest of Sharan (the district's administrative centre) by road. Dyurtyuli is the nearest rural locality.
