= Telyakey-Kubovo =

Telyakey-Kubovo Телякей-Кубово
- Village
- Location within Bashkortostan Location within Russia
- Coordinates: 54°26′N 54°20′E
- Country: Russia
- Region: Bashkortostan
- District: Buzdyaksky District
- Time zone: UTC+5:00

Telyakey-Kubovo (Russian: Телякей-Кубово; Bashkir: Теләкәй-Ҡобау, Teläkäy-Qobaw) is a rural locality (a village) in Kanly-Turkeyevsky Selsoviet, Buzdyaksky District, Bashkortostan, Russia. The population was 44 as of 2010. There are 3 streets.

== Geography ==
Telyakey-Kubovo is located 26 km southwest of Buzdyak (the district's administrative centre) by road. Kazaklar-Kubovo is the nearest rural locality.
