= Kiskakulbash =

Kiskakulbash Кискакулбаш
- Village
- Location within Bashkortostan Location within Russia
- Coordinates: 54°51′N 54°33′E
- Country: Russia
- Region: Bashkortostan
- District: Buzdyaksky District
- Time zone: UTC+5:00

Kiskakulbash (Russian: Кискакулбаш; Bashkir: Ҡыҫҡаҡулбаш, Qıśqaqulbaş) is a rural locality (a village) in Kuzeyevsky Selsoviet, Buzdyaksky District, Bashkortostan, Russia. The population was 34 as of 2010. There is 1 street.

== Geography ==
Kiskakulbash is located 35 km north of Buzdyak (the district's administrative centre) by road. Kuzeyevo is the nearest rural locality.
