= Preobrazhenskoye, Sharansky District, Republic of Bashkortostan =

Preobrazhenskoye Преображенское
- Village
- Location within Bashkortostan Location within Russia
- Coordinates: 54°50′N 53°56′E
- Country: Russia
- Region: Bashkortostan
- District: Sharansky District
- Time zone: UTC+5:00

Preobrazhenskoye (Russian: Преображенское) is a rural locality (a village) located in Dmitriyevo-Polyansky Selsoviet, Sharansky District, Bashkortostan, Russia. The population was 55 as of 2010. There is 1 street.

== Geography ==
Preobrazhenskoye is located 5 km northwest of Sharan (the district's administrative centre) by road. Dmitriyeva Polyana is the nearest rural locality.
