= Komsomol, Buzdyaksky District, Republic of Bashkortostan =

Komsomol Комсомол
- Selo
- Location within Bashkortostan Location within Russia
- Coordinates: 54°33′N 54°40′E
- Country: Russia
- Region: Bashkortostan
- District: Buzdyaksky District
- Time zone: UTC+5:00

Komsomol (Russian: Комсомол) is a rural locality (a selo) in Gafuriysky Selsoviet, Buzdyaksky District, Bashkortostan, Russia. The population was 316 as of 2010. There are 4 streets.

== Geography ==
Komsomol is located 11 km east of Buzdyak (the district's administrative centre) by road. Syrtlanovo is the nearest rural locality.
