= Novoyumashevo =

Novoyumashevo Новоюмашево
- Selo
- Location within Bashkortostan Location within Russia
- Coordinates: 54°57′N 54°11′E
- Country: Russia
- Region: Bashkortostan
- District: Sharansky District
- Time zone: UTC+5:00

Novoyumashevo (Russian: Новоюмашево; Bashkir: Яңы Йомаш, Yañı Yomaş) is a rural locality (a selo) in Michurinsky Selsoviet, Sharansky District, Bashkortostan, Russia. The population was 296 as of 2010. There are 2 streets.

== Geography ==
Novoyumashevo is located 21 km northeast of Sharan (the district's administrative centre) by road. Timirovo is the nearest rural locality.
