= Sakty =

Sakty Сакты
- Selo
- Location within Bashkortostan Location within Russia
- Coordinates: 54°59′N 54°02′E
- Country: Russia
- Region: Bashkortostan
- District: Sharansky District
- Time zone: UTC+5:00

Sakty (Russian: Сакты; Bashkir: Саҡты, Saqtı) is a rural locality (a selo) in Pisarevsky Selsoviet, Sharansky District, Bashkortostan, Russia. The population was 260 as of 2010. There are 3 streets.

== Geography ==
Sakty is located 31 km north of Sharan (the district's administrative centre) by road. Novoknyazevo is the nearest rural locality.
