= Kubalyak =

Kubalyak Кубаляк
- Village
- Location within Bashkortostan Location within Russia
- Coordinates: 54°52′N 54°05′E
- Country: Russia
- Region: Bashkortostan
- District: Sharansky District
- Time zone: UTC+5:00

Kubalyak (Russian: Кубаляк; Bashkir: Күбәләк, Kübäläk) is a rural locality (a village) in Michurinsky Selsoviet, Sharansky District, Bashkortostan, Russia. The population was 31 as of 2010. There are two streets.

== Geography ==
Kubalyak is located 9 km northeast of Sharan (the district's administrative centre) by road. Karazybash is the nearest rural locality.
