= Starotumbagushevo =

Starotumbagushevo Старотумбагушево
- Village
- Location within Bashkortostan Location within Russia
- Coordinates: 54°52′N 54°02′E
- Country: Russia
- Region: Bashkortostan
- District: Sharansky District
- Time zone: UTC+5:00

Starotumbagushevo (Russian: Старотумбагушево; Bashkir: Иҫке Томбағош, İśke Tombağoş) is a rural locality (a village) and the administrative centre of Starotumbagushevsky Selsoviet, Sharansky District, Bashkortostan, Russia. The population was 289 as of 2010. There are 4 streets.

== Geography ==
Starotumbagushevo is located 9 km north of Sharan (the district's administrative centre) by road. Novotumbagushevo is the nearest rural locality.
