= Ishmenevo =

Ishmenevo Ишменево
- Village
- Location within Bashkortostan Location within Russia
- Coordinates: 54°41′N 54°31′E
- Country: Russia
- Region: Bashkortostan
- District: Buzdyaksky District
- Time zone: UTC+5:00

Ishmenevo (Russian: Ишменево; Bashkir: Ишмән, İşmän) is a rural locality (a village) in Karansky Selsoviet, Buzdyaksky District, Bashkortostan, Russia. The population was 53 as of 2010. There is 1 street.

== Geography ==
Ishmenevo is located 16 km north of Buzdyak (the district's administrative centre) by road. Bayrash is the nearest rural locality.
