= Yakupovo =

Yakupovo Якупово
- Selo
- Location within Bashkortostan Location within Russia
- Coordinates: 54°48′N 54°32′E
- Country: Russia
- Region: Bashkortostan
- District: Buzdyaksky District
- Time zone: UTC+5:00

Yakupovo (Russian: Якупово; Bashkir: Яҡуп, Yaqup) is a rural locality (a selo) in Kilimovsky Selsoviet, Buzdyaksky District, Bashkortostan, Russia. The population was 312 as of 2010. There are 2 streets.

== Geography ==
Yakupovo is located 30 km north of Buzdyak (the district's administrative centre) by road. Shigaykulbash is the nearest rural locality.
