= Ursayevo =

Ursayevo Урсаево
- Village
- Location within Bashkortostan Location within Russia
- Coordinates: 54°50′N 54°07′E
- Country: Russia
- Region: Bashkortostan
- District: Sharansky District
- Time zone: UTC+5:00

Ursayevo (Russian: Урсаево; Bashkir: Урсай, Ursay) is a rural locality (a village) in Akbarisovsky Selsoviet, Sharansky District, Bashkortostan, Russia. The population was 106 as of 2010. There is 1 street.

== Geography ==
Ursayevo is located 9 km northeast of Sharan (the district's administrative centre) by road. Bikkulovo is the nearest rural locality.
