= Starochikeyevo =

Starochikeyevo Старочикеево
- Selo
- Location within Bashkortostan Location within Russia
- Coordinates: 55°01′N 54°16′E
- Country: Russia
- Region: Bashkortostan
- District: Sharansky District
- Time zone: UTC+5:00

Starochikeyevo (Russian: Старочикеево; Bashkir: Иҫке Сикәй, İśke Sikäy) is a rural locality (a selo) in Michurinsky Selsoviet, Sharansky District, Bashkortostan, Russia. The population was 218 as of 2010. There is 1 street.

Starochikeyevo is located 31 km northeast of Sharan (the district's administrative centre) by road. Chishma-Karan is the nearest rural locality.
