= Starodrazhzhevo =

Starodrazhzhevo Стародражжево
- Selo
- Location within Bashkortostan Location within Russia
- Coordinates: 54°57′N 53°52′E
- Country: Russia
- Region: Bashkortostan
- District: Sharansky District
- Time zone: UTC+5:00

Starodrazhzhevo (Russian: Стародражжево; Bashkir: Иҫке Драж, İśke Draj) is a rural locality (a selo) in Pisarevsky Selsoviet, Sharansky District, Bashkortostan, Russia. The population was 118 as of 2010. There are 2 streets.

== Geography ==
Starodrazhzhevo is located 19 km northwest of Sharan (the district's administrative centre) by road. Anisimova Polyana is the nearest rural locality.
