= Yunost, Sharansky District, Republic of Bashkortostan =

Yunost Юность
- Village
- Location within Bashkortostan Location within Russia
- Coordinates: 54°58′N 54°15′E
- Country: Russia
- Region: Bashkortostan
- District: Sharansky District
- Time zone: UTC+5:00

Yunost (Russian: Юность) is a rural locality (a village) in Michurinsky Selsoviet, Sharansky District, Bashkortostan, Russia. The population was 106 as of 2010. There are 2 streets.

== Geography ==
Yunost is located 26 km northeast of Sharan (the district's administrative centre) by road. Yelanchikbash is the nearest rural locality.
