= Tash-Chishma =

Tash-Chishma Таш-Чишма
- Village
- Location within Bashkortostan Location within Russia
- Coordinates: 54°54′N 53°40′E
- Country: Russia
- Region: Bashkortostan
- District: Sharansky District
- Time zone: UTC+5:00

Tash-Chishma (Russian: Таш-Чишма; Bashkir: Ташшишмә, Taşşişmä) is a rural locality (a village) in Nizhnezaitovsky Selsoviet, Sharansky District, Bashkortostan, Russia. The population was 10 as of 2010. There is 1 street.

== Geography ==
Tash-Chishma is located 40 km northwest of Sharan (the district's administrative centre) by road. Kugarchi-Bulyak is the nearest rural locality.
