= Uranovo =

Uranovo Ураново
- Village
- Location within Bashkortostan Location within Russia
- Coordinates: 54°42′N 54°29′E
- Country: Russia
- Region: Bashkortostan
- District: Buzdyaksky District
- Time zone: UTC+5:00

Uranovo (Russian: Ураново; Bashkir: Уран, Uran) is a rural locality (a village) in Karansky Selsoviet, Buzdyaksky District, Bashkortostan, Russia. The population was 419 as of 2010. There are 6 streets.

== Geography ==
Uranovo is located 19 km north of Buzdyak (the district's administrative centre) by road. Karan is the nearest rural locality.
