= Stary Tamyan =

Stary Tamyan Старый Тамьян
- Village
- Location within Bashkortostan Location within Russia
- Coordinates: 54°45′N 54°06′E
- Country: Russia
- Region: Bashkortostan
- District: Sharansky District
- Time zone: UTC+5:00

Stary Tamyan (Russian: Старый Тамьян; Bashkir: Иҫке Тамъян, İśke Tamyan) is a rural locality (a village) in Bazgiyevsky Selsoviet, Sharansky District, Bashkortostan, Russia. The population was 156 as of 2010. There is 1 street.

== Geography ==
Stary Tamyan is located 22 km southeast of Sharan (the district's administrative centre) by road. Kir-Tlyavli is the nearest rural locality.
