= Ulik-Yelga =

Ulik-Yelga Улик-Елга
- Village
- Location within Bashkortostan Location within Russia
- Coordinates: 54°46′N 53°52′E
- Country: Russia
- Region: Bashkortostan
- District: Sharansky District
- Time zone: UTC+5:00

Ulik-Yelga (Russian: Улик-Елга; Bashkir: Үлекйылға, Ülekyılğa) is a rural locality (a village) in Dyurtyulinsky Selsoviet, Sharansky District, Bashkortostan, Russia. The population was 36 as of 2010. There is 1 street.

== Geography ==
Ulik-Yelga is located 16 km southwest of Sharan (the district's administrative centre) by road. Chalmaly is the nearest rural locality.
