= Novokilimovo =

Novokilimovo Новокилимово
- Village
- Location within Bashkortostan Location within Russia
- Coordinates: 54°29′N 54°37′E
- Country: Russia
- Region: Bashkortostan
- District: Buzdyaksky District
- Time zone: UTC+5:00

Novokilimovo (Russian: Новокилимово; Bashkir: Яңы Килем, Yañı Kilem) is a rural locality (a village) in Gafuriysky Selsoviet, Buzdyaksky District, Bashkortostan, Russia. The population was 88 as of 2010. There is 1 street.

== Geography ==
Novokilimovo is located 15 km southeast of Buzdyak (the district's administrative centre) by road. Mikhaylovka is the nearest rural locality.
