= Tyuryushevo =

Tyuryushevo Тюрюшево
- Selo
- Location within Bashkortostan Location within Russia
- Coordinates: 54°54′N 54°34′E
- Country: Russia
- Region: Bashkortostan
- District: Buzdyaksky District
- Time zone: UTC+5:00

Tyuryushevo (Russian: Тюрюшево; Bashkir: Түреш, Türeş) is a rural locality (a selo) and the administrative centre of Tyuryushevsky Selsoviet, Buzdyaksky District, Bashkortostan, Russia. The population was 722 as of 2010. There are 4 streets.

== Geography ==
Tyuryushevo is located 40 km north of Buzdyak (the district's administrative centre) by road. Kuzeyevo is the nearest rural locality.
