= Michurinsk, Sharansky District, Republic of Bashkortostan =

Michurinsk Мичуринск
- Selo
- Location within Bashkortostan Location within Russia
- Coordinates: 54°56′N 54°08′E
- Country: Russia
- Region: Bashkortostan
- District: Sharansky District
- Time zone: UTC+5:00

Michurinsk (Russian: Мичуринск) is a rural locality (a selo) and the administrative centre of Michurinsky Selsoviet, Sharansky District, Bashkortostan, Russia. The population was 328 in 2010. There are seven streets.

== Geography ==
Michurinsk is located 16 km northeast of Sharan (the district's administrative centre) by road. Bulansaz is the nearest rural locality.
