= Barsukovo, Sharansky District, Republic of Bashkortostan =

Barsukovo Барсуково
- Selo
- Location within Bashkortostan Location within Russia
- Coordinates: 54°48′N 53°47′E
- Country: Russia
- Region: Bashkortostan
- District: Sharansky District
- Time zone: UTC+5:00

Barsukovo (Russian: Барсуково; Bashkir: Бурһыҡ, Burhıq) is a rural locality (a selo) in Dyurtyulinsky Selsoviet, Sharansky District, Bashkortostan, Russia. The population was 269 as of 2010. There are 3 streets.

== Geography ==
Barsukovo is located 17 km west of Sharan (the district's administrative centre) by road. Zirikly is the nearest rural locality.
