= Novy Shigay =

Novy Shigay Новый Шигай
- Village
- Location within Bashkortostan Location within Russia
- Coordinates: 54°53′N 54°23′E
- Country: Russia
- Region: Bashkortostan
- District: Buzdyaksky District
- Time zone: UTC+5:00

Novy Shigay (Russian: Новый Шигай; Bashkir: Яңы Шығай, Yañı Şığay) is a rural locality (a village) in Sabayevsky Selsoviet, Buzdyaksky District, Bashkortostan, Russia. The population was 6 as of 2010. There is 1 street.

== Geography ==
Novy Shigay is located 45 km north of Buzdyak (the district's administrative centre) by road. Tugayevo is the nearest rural locality.
