= Nizhnezaitovo =

Nizhnezaitovo Нижнезаитово
- Selo
- Location within Bashkortostan Location within Russia
- Coordinates: 54°49′N 53°40′E
- Country: Russia
- Region: Bashkortostan
- District: Sharansky District
- Time zone: UTC+5:00

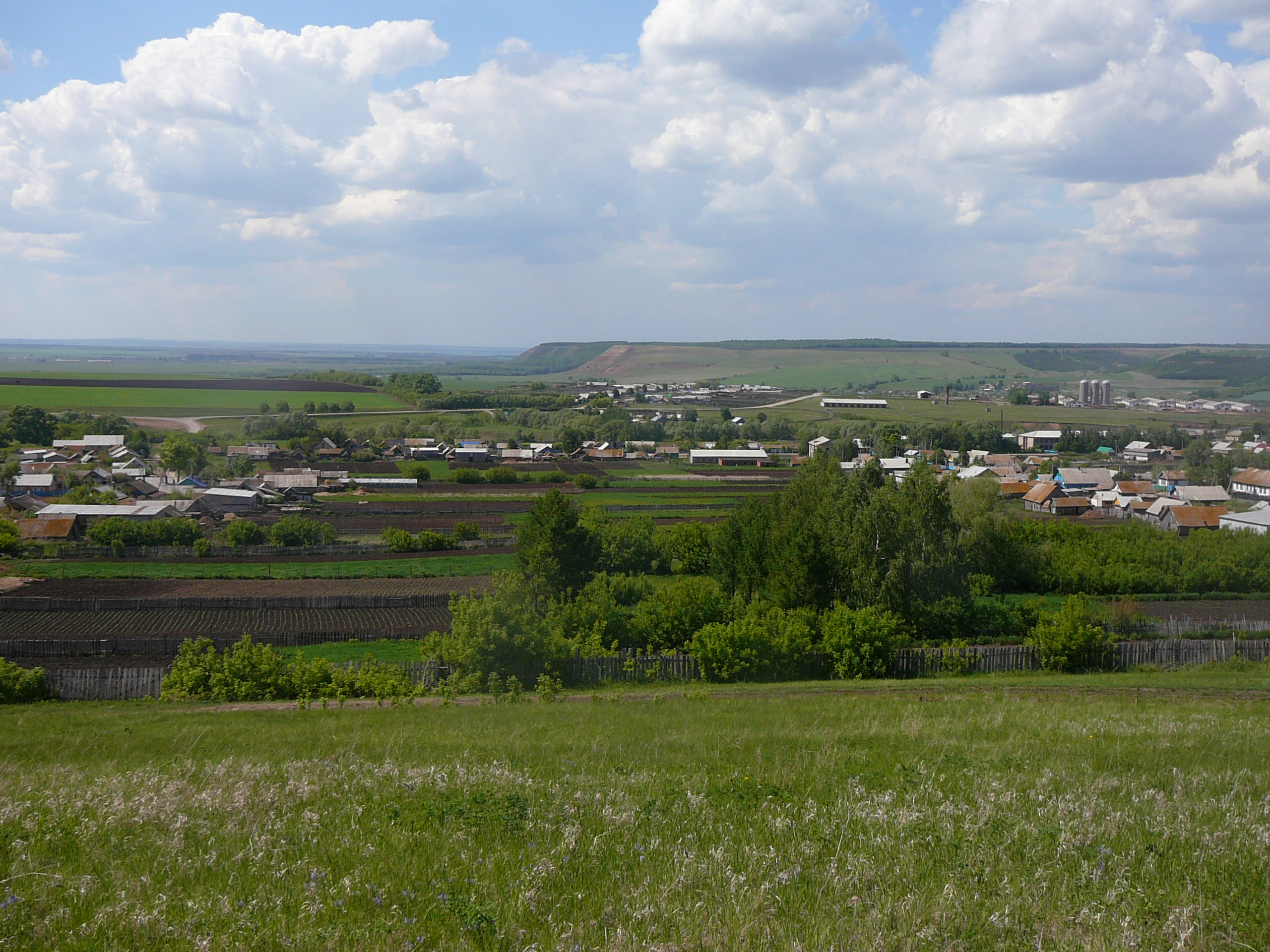

Nizhnezaitovo (Russian: Нижнезаитово; Bashkir: Түбәнге Зәйет, Tübänge Zäyet) is a rural locality (a selo) and the administrative centre of Nizhnezaitovsky Selsoviet, Sharansky District, Bashkortostan, Russia. The population was 690 as of 2010. There are 8 streets.

== Geography ==
Nizhnezaitovo is located 31 km west of Sharan (the district's administrative centre) by road. Chekan-Tamak is the nearest rural locality.
