= Stary Buzdyak =

Stary Buzdyak Старый Буздяк
- Selo
- Location within Bashkortostan Location within Russia
- Coordinates: 54°36′N 54°32′E
- Country: Russia
- Region: Bashkortostan
- District: Buzdyaksky District
- Time zone: UTC+5:00

Stary Buzdyak (Russian: Старый Буздяк; Bashkir: Иҫке Бүздәк, İśke Büzdäk) is a rural locality (a selo) in Urtakulsky Selsoviet, Buzdyaksky District, Bashkortostan, Russia. The population was 484 as of 2010. There are 15 streets.

== Geography ==
Stary Buzdyak is located 6 km north of Buzdyak (the district's administrative centre) by road. Buzdyak is the nearest rural locality.
