= Stary Shigay =

Stary Shigay Старый Шигай
- Selo
- Location within Bashkortostan Location within Russia
- Coordinates: 54°51′N 54°29′E
- Country: Russia
- Region: Bashkortostan
- District: Buzdyaksky District
- Time zone: UTC+5:00

Stary Shigay (Russian: Старый Шигай; Bashkir: Иҫке Шығай, İśke Şığay) is a rural locality (a selo) in Sabayevsky Selsoviet, Buzdyaksky District, Bashkortostan, Russia. The population was 153 as of 2010. There are 2 streets.

== Geography ==
Stary Shigay is located 39 km north of Buzdyak (the district's administrative centre) by road. Sabayevo is the nearest rural locality.
