= Shigaykulbash =

Shigaykulbash Шигайкулбаш
- Village
- Location within Bashkortostan Location within Russia
- Coordinates: 54°49′N 54°34′E
- Country: Russia
- Region: Bashkortostan
- District: Buzdyaksky District
- Time zone: UTC+5:00

Shigaykulbash (Russian: Шигайкулбаш; Bashkir: Шығайкүлбаш, Şığaykülbaş) is a rural locality (a village) in Kilimovsky Selsoviet, Buzdyaksky District, Bashkortostan, Russia. The population was 72 as of 2010. There is 1 street.

== Geography ==
Shigaykulbash is located 30 km north of Buzdyak (the district's administrative centre) by road. Yakupovo is the nearest rural locality.
