= Dmitriyeva Polyana =

Dmitriyeva Polyana Дмитриева Поляна
- Village
- Location within Bashkortostan Location within Russia
- Coordinates: 54°51′N 53°55′E
- Country: Russia
- Region: Bashkortostan
- District: Sharansky District
- Time zone: UTC+5:00

Dmitriyeva Polyana (Russian: Дмитриева Поляна) is a rural locality (a village) and the administrative centre of Dmitriyevo-Polyansky Selsoviet, Sharansky District, Bashkortostan, Russia. The population was 545 as of 2010. There are 10 streets.

== Geography ==
Dmitriyeva Polyana is located 8 km northwest of Sharan (the district's administrative centre) by road. Preobrazhenskoye is the nearest rural locality.
