= Ishtiryak =

Ishtiryak Иштиряк
- Village
- Location within Bashkortostan Location within Russia
- Coordinates: 54°35′N 54°20′E
- Country: Russia
- Region: Bashkortostan
- District: Buzdyaksky District
- Time zone: UTC+5:00

Ishtiryak (Russian: Иштиряк; Bashkir: Иштирәк, İştiräk) is a rural locality (a village) in Arslanovsky Selsoviet, Buzdyaksky District, Bashkortostan, Russia. The population was 11 as of 2010. There is 1 street.

== Geography ==
Ishtiryak is located 26 km northwest of Buzdyak (the district's administrative centre) by road. Yulduzly is the nearest rural locality.
