= Tallykul, Sharansky District, Republic of Bashkortostan =

Tallykul Таллыкуль
- Village
- Location within Bashkortostan Location within Russia
- Coordinates: 54°52′N 53°48′E
- Country: Russia
- Region: Bashkortostan
- District: Sharansky District
- Time zone: UTC+5:00

Tallykul (Russian: Таллыкуль; Bashkir: Таллыкүл, Tallıkül) is a rural locality (a village) in Ziriklinsky Selsoviet, Sharansky District, Bashkortostan, Russia. The population was 14 as of 2010. There is 1 street.

== Geography ==
Tallykul is located 28 km northwest of Sharan (the district's administrative centre) by road. Kurtutel is the nearest rural locality.
