= Dyurmenevo =

Dyurmenevo Дюрменево
- Selo
- Location within Bashkortostan Location within Russia
- Coordinates: 54°44′N 53°52′E
- Country: Russia
- Region: Bashkortostan
- District: Sharansky District
- Time zone: UTC+5:00

Dyurmenevo (Russian: Дюрменево; Bashkir: Дүрмән, Dürmän) is a rural locality (a selo) in Chalmalinsky Selsoviet, Sharansky District, Bashkortostan, Russia. The population was 325 as of 2010. There are 3 streets.

== Geography ==
Dyurmenevo is located 13 km southwest of Sharan (the district's administrative centre) by road. Chalmaly is the nearest rural locality.
