= Alpayevo =

Alpayevo Алпаево
- Village
- Location within Bashkortostan Location within Russia
- Coordinates: 54°50′N 53°49′E
- Country: Russia
- Region: Bashkortostan
- District: Sharansky District
- Time zone: UTC+5:00

Alpayevo (Russian: Алпаево; Bashkir: Алпай, Alpay) is a rural locality (a village) in Ziriklinsky Selsoviet, Sharansky District, Bashkortostan, Russia. The population was 103 as of 2010. There are 2 streets.

== Geography ==
Alpayevo is located 24 km west of Sharan (the district's administrative centre) by road. Zirikly is the nearest rural locality.
