= Kuzeyevo, Buzdyaksky District, Republic of Bashkortostan =

Kuzeyevo Кузеево
- Selo
- Location within Bashkortostan Location within Russia
- Coordinates: 54°52′N 54°36′E
- Country: Russia
- Region: Bashkortostan
- District: Buzdyaksky District
- Time zone: UTC+5:00

Kuzeyevo (Russian: Кузеево; Bashkir: Күҙәй, Küźäy) is a rural locality (a selo) and the administrative centre of Kuzeyevsky Selsoviet, Buzdyaksky District, Bashkortostan, Russia. The population was 492 as of 2010. There are 6 streets.

== Geography ==
Kuzeyevo is located 40 km north of Buzdyak (the district's administrative centre) by road. Akhun is the nearest rural locality.
