= Urzaybash =

Urzaybash Урзайбаш
- Selo
- Location within Bashkortostan Location within Russia
- Coordinates: 54°41′N 54°22′E
- Country: Russia
- Region: Bashkortostan
- District: Buzdyaksky District
- Time zone: UTC+5:00

Urzaybash (Russian: Урзайбаш; Bashkir: Урҙайбаш, Urźaybaş) is a rural locality (a selo) in Arslanovsky Selsoviet, Buzdyaksky District, Bashkortostan, Russia. The population was 713 as of 2010. There are 4 streets.

== Geography ==
Urzaybash is located 26 km northwest of Buzdyak (the district's administrative centre) by road. Kyzyl-Yelga is the nearest rural locality.
