= Sharanbash-Knyazevo =

Sharanbash-Knyazevo Шаранбаш-Князево
- Selo
- Location within Bashkortostan Location within Russia
- Coordinates: 54°57′N 54°07′E
- Country: Russia
- Region: Bashkortostan
- District: Sharansky District
- Time zone: UTC+5:00

Sharanbash-Knyazevo (Russian: Шаранбаш-Князево; Bashkir: Шаранбаш-Кенәз, Şaranbaş-Kenäz) is a rural locality (a selo) in Michurinsky Selsoviet, Sharansky District, Bashkortostan, Russia. The population was 429 as of 2010. There are 3 streets.

== Geography ==
Sharanbash-Knyazevo is located 20 km northeast of Sharan (the district's administrative centre) by road. Michurinsk is the nearest rural locality.
