= Verkhniye Tashly =

Verkhniye Tashly Верхние Ташлы
- Selo
- Location within Bashkortostan Location within Russia
- Coordinates: 54°56′N 53°45′E
- Country: Russia
- Region: Bashkortostan
- District: Sharansky District
- Time zone: UTC+5:00

Verkhniye Tashly (Russian: Верхние Ташлы; Bashkir: Үрге Ташлы, Ürge Taşlı) is a rural locality (a selo) in Nizhnetashlinsky Selsoviet, Sharansky District, Bashkortostan, Russia. The population was 248 as of 2010. There are 3 streets.

== Geography ==
Verkhniye Tashly is located 32 km northwest of Sharan (the district's administrative centre) by road. Nizhniye Tashly is the nearest rural locality.
