= Novye Karyavdy, Sharansky District, Republic of Bashkortostan =

Novye Karyavdy Новые Карьявды
- Selo
- Location within Bashkortostan Location within Russia
- Coordinates: 54°54′N 54°06′E
- Country: Russia
- Region: Bashkortostan
- District: Sharansky District
- Time zone: UTC+5:00

Novye Karyavdy (Russian: Новые Карьявды; Bashkir: Яңы Ҡаръяуҙы, Yañı Qaryawźı) is a rural locality (a selo) in Michurinsky Selsoviet, Sharansky District, Bashkortostan, Russia. The population was 118 as of 2010. There are 3 streets.

== Geography ==
Novye Karyavdy is located 12 km northeast of Sharan (the district's administrative centre) by road. Stary Kichkinyash is the nearest rural locality.
