= Klyatayak =

Klyatayak Клятаяк
- Village
- Location within Bashkortostan Location within Russia
- Coordinates: 54°20′N 54°23′E
- Country: Russia
- Region: Bashkortostan
- District: Buzdyaksky District
- Time zone: UTC+5:00

Klyatayak (Russian: Клятаяк; Bashkir: Келәтаяҡ, Kelätayaq) is a rural locality (a village) in Kanly-Turkeyevsky Selsoviet, Buzdyaksky District, Bashkortostan, Russia. The population was 57 as of 2010. There are 2 streets.

== Geography ==
Klyatayak is located 34 km southwest of Buzdyak (the district's administrative centre) by road. Karanay is the nearest rural locality.
