= Novaya Sbrodovka =

Novaya Sbrodovka Новая Сбродовка
- Village
- Location within Bashkortostan Location within Russia
- Coordinates: 54°54′N 54°01′E
- Country: Russia
- Region: Bashkortostan
- District: Sharansky District
- Time zone: UTC+5:00

Novaya Sbrodovka (Russian: Новая Сбродовка) is a rural locality (a village) in Starotumbagushevsky Selsoviet, Sharansky District, Bashkortostan, Russia. The population was 15 as of 2010. There is 1 street.

== Geography ==
Novaya Sbrodovka is located 15 km north of Sharan (the district's administrative centre) by road. Yelan-Yelga is the nearest rural locality.
