= Urtakul =

Urtakul Уртакуль
- Selo
- Location within Bashkortostan Location within Russia
- Coordinates: 54°30′N 54°27′E
- Country: Russia
- Region: Bashkortostan
- District: Buzdyaksky District
- Time zone: UTC+5:00

Urtakul (Russian: Уртакуль; Bashkir: Уртакүл, Urtakül) is a rural locality (a selo) and the administrative centre of Urtakulsky Selsoviet, Buzdyaksky District, Bashkortostan, Russia. The population was 437 as of 2010. There are 5 streets.

== Geography ==
Urtakul is located 12 km southwest of Buzdyak (the district's administrative centre) by road. Kiska-Yelga is the nearest rural locality.
