= Novoaktau =

Novoaktau Новоактау
- Selo
- Location within Bashkortostan Location within Russia
- Coordinates: 54°45′N 54°21′E
- Country: Russia
- Region: Bashkortostan
- District: Buzdyaksky District
- Time zone: UTC+5:00

Novoaktau (Russian: Новоактау; Bashkir: Яңы Аҡтау, Yañı Aqtaw) is a rural locality (a selo) in Karansky Selsoviet, Buzdyaksky District, Bashkortostan, Russia. The population was 141 as of 2010. There are 4 streets.

== Geography ==
Novoaktau is located 31 km northwest of Buzdyak (the district's administrative centre) by road. Syunbash is the nearest rural locality.
