= Vostochnoye, Buzdyaksky District, Republic of Bashkortostan =

Vostochnoye Восточное
- Selo
- Location within Bashkortostan Location within Russia
- Coordinates: 54°38′N 54°34′E
- Country: Russia
- Region: Bashkortostan
- District: Buzdyaksky District
- Time zone: UTC+5:00

Vostochnoye (Russian: Восточное; Bashkir: Көнсығыш, Könsığış) is a rural locality (a selo) in Buzdyaksky Selsoviet, Buzdyaksky District, Bashkortostan, Russia. The population was 421 as of 2010. There are 7 streets.

== Geography ==
Vostochnoye is located 12 km north of Buzdyak (the district's administrative centre) by road. Stary Buzdyak is the nearest rural locality.
