= Bakhcha, Sharansky District, Republic of Bashkortostan =

Bakhcha Бахча
- Village
- Location within Bashkortostan Location within Russia
- Coordinates: 54°48′N 54°15′E
- Country: Russia
- Region: Bashkortostan
- District: Sharansky District
- Time zone: UTC+5:00

Bakhcha (Russian: Бахча; Bashkir: Баҡса, Baqsa) is a rural locality (a village) in Nureyevsky Selsoviet, Sharansky District, Bashkortostan, Russia. The population was 46 as of 2010. There is 1 street.

== Geography ==
Bakhcha is located 30 km east of Sharan (the district's administrative centre) by road. Yenakhmetovo is the nearest rural locality.
