= Bazgiyevo =

Bazgiyevo Базгиево
- Selo
- Location within Bashkortostan Location within Russia
- Coordinates: 54°43′N 54°04′E
- Country: Russia
- Region: Bashkortostan
- District: Sharansky District
- Time zone: UTC+5:00

Bazgiyevo (Russian: Базгиево; Bashkir: Баҙғыя, Baźğıya) is a rural locality (a selo) and the administrative centre of Bazgiyevsky Selsoviet, Sharansky District, Bashkortostan, Russia. The population was 465 as of 2010. There are 3 streets.

== Geography ==
Bazgiyevo is located 16 km southeast of Sharan (the district's administrative centre) by road. Novy Tamyan is the nearest rural locality.
