= Idyashbash =

Idyashbash Идяшбаш
- Village
- Location within Bashkortostan Location within Russia
- Coordinates: 54°52′N 54°19′E
- Country: Russia
- Region: Bashkortostan
- District: Buzdyaksky District
- Time zone: UTC+5:00

Idyashbash (Russian: Идяшбаш; Bashkir: Иҙәшбаш, İźäşbaş) is a rural locality (a village) in Sabayevsky Selsoviet, Buzdyaksky District, Bashkortostan, Russia. The population was 154 as of 2010. There are 2 streets.

== Geography ==
Idyashbash is located 46 km northwest of Buzdyak (the district's administrative centre) by road. Tugayevo is the nearest rural locality.
