= Chalmaly =

Chalmaly Чалмалы
- Selo
- Location within Bashkortostan Location within Russia
- Coordinates: 54°45′N 53°54′E
- Country: Russia
- Region: Bashkortostan
- District: Sharansky District
- Time zone: UTC+5:00

Chalmaly (Russian: Чалмалы; Bashkir: Салмалы, Salmalı) is a rural locality (a selo) and the administrative centre of Chalmalinsky Selsoviet, Sharansky District, Bashkortostan, Russia. The population was 563 as of 2010. There are 13 street.

== Geography ==
Chalmaly is located 10 km southwest of Sharan (the district's administrative centre) by road. Dyurmenevo is the nearest rural locality.
