= Karazirek =

Karazirek Каразирек
- Village
- Location within Bashkortostan Location within Russia
- Coordinates: 54°56′N 54°27′E
- Country: Russia
- Region: Bashkortostan
- District: Buzdyaksky District
- Time zone: UTC+5:00

Karazirek (Russian: Каразирек; Bashkir: Ҡараерек, Qarayerek) is a rural locality (a village) in Tyuryushevsky Selsoviet, Buzdyaksky District, Bashkortostan, Russia. The population was 123 as of 2010. There is 1 street.

== Geography ==
Karazirek is located 45 km north of Buzdyak (the district's administrative centre) by road. Makarovka is the nearest rural locality.
