= Yaltyrkulbash =

Yaltyrkulbash Ялтыркулбаш
- Village
- Location within Bashkortostan Location within Russia
- Coordinates: 54°48′N 54°35′E
- Country: Russia
- Region: Bashkortostan
- District: Buzdyaksky District
- Time zone: UTC+5:00

Yaltyrkulbash (Russian: Ялтыркулбаш; Bashkir: Ялтырҡулбаш, Yaltırqulbaş) is a rural locality (a village) in Kilimovsky Selsoviet, Buzdyaksky District, Bashkortostan, Russia. The population was 10 as of 2010. There is 1 street.

== Geography ==
Yaltyrkulbash is located 29 km north of Buzdyak (the district's administrative centre) by road. Yakupovo is the nearest rural locality.
