= Yumadybash =

Yumadybash Юмадыбаш
- Selo
- Location within Bashkortostan Location within Russia
- Coordinates: 54°44′N 53°58′E
- Country: Russia
- Region: Bashkortostan
- District: Sharansky District
- Time zone: UTC+5:00

Yumadybash (Russian: Юмадыбаш; Bashkir: Йомаҙыбаш, Yomaźıbaş) is a rural locality (a selo) in Chalmalinsky Selsoviet, Sharansky District, Bashkortostan, Russia. The population was 519 as of 2010. There are 4 street.

== Geography ==
Yumadybash is located 13 km south of Sharan (the district's administrative centre) by road. Tarkhan is the nearest rural locality.
