= Karanay, Republic of Bashkortostan =

Karanay Каранай
- Village
- Location within Bashkortostan Location within Russia
- Coordinates: 54°21′N 54°21′E
- Country: Russia
- Region: Bashkortostan
- District: Buzdyaksky District
- Time zone: UTC+5:00

Karanay (Russian: Каранай; Bashkir: Ҡаранай, Qaranay) is a rural locality (a village) in Kanly-Turkeyevsky Selsoviet, Buzdyaksky District, Bashkortostan, Russia. The population was 14 as of 2010. There is 1 street.

== Geography ==
Karanay is located 33 km southwest of Buzdyak (the district's administrative centre) by road. Novosemenkino is the nearest rural locality.
