= Stary Karbash =

Stary Karbash Старый Карбаш
- Village
- Location within Bashkortostan Location within Russia
- Coordinates: 54°47′N 54°26′E
- Country: Russia
- Region: Bashkortostan
- District: Buzdyaksky District
- Time zone: UTC+5:00

Stary Karbash (Russian: Старый Карбаш; Bashkir: Иҫке Ҡарбаш, İśke Qarbaş) is a rural locality (a village) in Tavlarovsky Selsoviet, Buzdyaksky District, Bashkortostan, Russia. The population was 122 as of 2010. There is 1 street.

== Geography ==
Stary Karbash is located 34 km north of Buzdyak (the district's administrative centre) by road. Kartamak is the nearest rural locality.
