= Novobaygildino =

Novobaygildino Новобайгильдино
- Village
- Location within Bashkortostan Location within Russia
- Coordinates: 54°59′N 54°14′E
- Country: Russia
- Region: Bashkortostan
- District: Sharansky District
- Time zone: UTC+5:00

Novobaygildino (Russian: Новобайгильдино; Bashkir: Яңы Байгилде, Yañı Baygilde; Meadow Mari: У Пайгелде, U Pajgelde) is a rural locality (a village) in Michurinsky Selsoviet, Sharansky District, Bashkortostan, Russia. The population was 55 as of 2010. There is 1 street.

== Geography ==
Novobaygildino is located 26 km northeast of Sharan (the district's administrative centre) by road. Novobaykiyevo is the nearest rural locality.
