= Chekan-Tamak =

Chekan-Tamak Чекан-Тамак
- Selo
- Location within Bashkortostan Location within Russia
- Coordinates: 54°50′N 53°38′E
- Country: Russia
- Region: Bashkortostan
- District: Sharansky District
- Time zone: UTC+5:00

Chekan-Tamak (Russian: Чекан-Тамак; Bashkir: Сәкәнтамаҡ, Säkäntamaq) is a rural locality (a selo) in Nizhnezaitovsky Selsoviet, Sharansky District, Bashkortostan, Russia. The population was 78 as of 2010. There are 3 street.

== Geography ==
Chekan-Tamak is located 33 km west of Sharan (the district's administrative centre) by road. Nizhnezaitovo is the nearest rural locality.
