= Tan, Sharansky District, Republic of Bashkortostan =

Tan Тан
- Village
- Location within Bashkortostan Location within Russia
- Coordinates: 54°42′N 53°52′E
- Country: Russia
- Region: Bashkortostan
- District: Sharansky District
- Time zone: UTC+5:00

Tan (Russian: Тан; Bashkir: Таң, Tañ) is a rural locality (a village) in Chalmalinsky Selsoviet, Sharansky District, Bashkortostan, Russia. The population was 16 as of 2010.

== Geography ==
Tan is located 18 km southwest of Sharan (the district's administrative centre) by road. Dyurmenevo is the nearest rural locality.
