= Starotavlarovo =

Starotavlarovo Старотавларово
- Selo
- Location within Bashkortostan Location within Russia
- Coordinates: 54°49′N 54°24′E
- Country: Russia
- Region: Bashkortostan
- District: Buzdyaksky District
- Time zone: UTC+5:00

Starotavlarovo (Russian: Старотавларово; Bashkir: Иҫке Таулар, İśke Tawlar) is a rural locality (a selo) and the administrative centre of Tavlarovsky Selsoviet, Buzdyaksky District, Bashkortostan, Russia. The population was 737 in 2010. There are nine streets.

== Geography ==
Starotavlarovo is located 37 km north of Buzdyak (the district's administrative centre) by road. Kubyak is the nearest rural locality.
