= Temyakovo =

Temyakovo Темяково
- Village
- Location within Bashkortostan Location within Russia
- Coordinates: 54°55′N 54°01′E
- Country: Russia
- Region: Bashkortostan
- District: Sharansky District
- Time zone: UTC+5:00

Temyakovo (Russian: Темяково) is a rural locality (a village) in Starotumbagushevsky Selsoviet, Sharansky District, Bashkortostan, Russia. The population was 107 as of 2010. There are 4 streets.

== Geography ==
Temyakovo is located 15 km north of Sharan (the district's administrative centre) by road. Yelan-Yelga is the nearest rural locality.
