= Sevadybashevo =

Sevadybashevo Севадыбашево
- Selo
- Location within Bashkortostan Location within Russia
- Coordinates: 54°57′N 54°39′E
- Country: Russia
- Region: Bashkortostan
- District: Buzdyaksky District
- Time zone: UTC+5:00

Sevadybashevo (Russian: Севадыбашево; Bashkir: Сәүәҙебаш, Säwäźebaş) is a rural locality (a selo) in Tyuryushevsky Selsoviet, Buzdyaksky District, Bashkortostan, Russia. The population was 604 as of 2010. There are 10 streets.

== Geography ==
Sevadybashevo is located 50 km north of Buzdyak (the district's administrative centre) by road. Nizhnyaya Chatra is the nearest rural locality.
