= Grigoryevka, Sharansky District, Republic of Bashkortostan =

Grigoryevka Григорьевка
- Village
- Location within Bashkortostan Location within Russia
- Coordinates: 54°56′N 54°16′E
- Country: Russia
- Region: Bashkortostan
- District: Sharansky District
- Time zone: UTC+5:00

Grigoryevka (Russian: Григорьевка) is a rural locality (a village) in Michurinsky Selsoviet, Sharansky District, Bashkortostan, Russia. The population was 47 as of 2010. There is 1 street.

== Geography ==
Grigoryevka is located 27 km northeast of Sharan (the district's administrative centre) by road. Novotroitsk is the nearest rural locality.
