= Sunbash =

Rural locality in Bashkortostan, Russia

Sunbash Сюньбаш
- Selo
- Location within Bashkortostan Location within Russia
- Coordinates: 54°47′N 54°16′E
- Country: Russia
- Region: Bashkortostan
- District: Sharansky District
- Time zone: UTC+5:00

Sunbash (Russian: Сюньбаш; Bashkir: Сөнбаш, Sönbaş) is a rural locality (a selo) in Nureyevsky Selsoviet, Sharansky District, Bashkortostan, Russia. The population was 51 as of 2010. There is 1 street.

== Geography ==
Sunbash is located 31 km east of Sharan (the district's administrative centre) by road. Tugaryak is the nearest rural locality.
