= Tugaryak =

Tugaryak Тугаряк
- Village
- Location within Bashkortostan Location within Russia
- Coordinates: 54°46′N 54°15′E
- Country: Russia
- Region: Bashkortostan
- District: Sharansky District
- Time zone: UTC+5:00

Tugaryak (Russian: Тугаряк; Bashkir: Түгәрәк, Tügäräk) is a rural locality (a village) in Nureyevsky Selsoviet, Sharansky District, Bashkortostan, Russia. The population was 3 as of 2010. There is 1 street.

== Geography ==
Tugaryak is located 31 km southeast of Sharan (the district's administrative centre) by road. Syunbash is the nearest rural locality.
