= Tuktarkul =

Tuktarkul Туктаркуль
- Village
- Location within Bashkortostan Location within Russia
- Coordinates: 54°34′N 54°38′E
- Country: Russia
- Region: Bashkortostan
- District: Buzdyaksky District
- Time zone: UTC+5:00

Tuktarkul (Russian: Туктаркуль; Bashkir: Туҡтаркүл, Tuqtarkül) is a rural locality (a village) in Buzdyaksky Selsoviet, Buzdyaksky District, Bashkortostan, Russia. The population was 55 as of 2010. There is 1 street.

== Geography ==
Tuktarkul is located 10 km east of Buzdyak (the district's administrative centre) by road. Sergeyevka is the nearest rural locality.
