= Rozhdestvenka, Republic of Bashkortostan =

Rozhdestvenka Рождественка
- Village
- Location within Bashkortostan Location within Russia
- Coordinates: 54°59′N 54°17′E
- Country: Russia
- Region: Bashkortostan
- District: Sharansky District
- Time zone: UTC+5:00

Rozhdestvenka (Russian: Рождественка) is a rural locality (a village) in Michurinsky Selsoviet, Sharansky District, Bashkortostan, Russia. The population was 151 as of 2010. There are 2 streets.

== Geography ==
Rozhdestvenka is located 30 km northeast of Sharan (the district's administrative centre) by road. Tri Klyucha is the nearest rural locality.
