= Staroturbeyevo =

Staroturbeyevo Старотурбеево
- Selo
- Location within Bashkortostan Location within Russia
- Coordinates: 54°55′N 54°06′E
- Country: Russia
- Region: Bashkortostan
- District: Sharansky District
- Time zone: UTC+5:00

Staroturbeyevo (Russian: Старотурбеево; Bashkir: Иҫке Тырбый, İśke Tırbıy) is a rural locality (a selo) in Michurinsky Selsoviet, Sharansky District, Bashkortostan, Russia. The population was 96 as of 2010. There is 1 street.

== Geography ==
Staroturbeyevo is located 16 km northeast of Sharan (the district's administrative centre) by road. Bulansaz is the nearest rural locality.
