= Nizhnyaya Chatra =

Nizhnyaya Chatra Нижняя Чатра
- Village
- Location within Bashkortostan Location within Russia
- Coordinates: 54°57′N 54°41′E
- Country: Russia
- Region: Bashkortostan
- District: Buzdyaksky District
- Time zone: UTC+5:00

Nizhnyaya Chatra (Russian: Нижняя Чатра; Bashkir: Түбәнге Сатра, Tübänge Satra) is a rural locality (a village) in Tyuryushevsky Selsoviet, Buzdyaksky District, Bashkortostan, Russia. The population was 41 as of 2010. There are 2 streets.

== Geography ==
Nizhnyaya Chatra is located 55 km north of Buzdyak (the district's administrative centre) by road. Sevadybashevo is the nearest rural locality.
