= Tallykulevo =

Tallykulevo Таллыкулево
- Village
- Location within Bashkortostan Location within Russia
- Coordinates: 54°24′N 54°22′E
- Country: Russia
- Region: Bashkortostan
- District: Buzdyaksky District
- Time zone: UTC+5:00

Tallykulevo (Russian: Таллыкулево; Bashkir: Таллыҡул, Tallıqul) is a rural locality (a village) in Kanly-Turkeyevsky Selsoviet, Buzdyaksky District, Bashkortostan, Russia. The population was 354 as of 2010. There are 4 streets.

== Geography ==
Tallykulevo is located 27 km southwest of Buzdyak (the district's administrative centre) by road. Telyakey-Kubovo is the nearest rural locality.
