= Karakashly, Republic of Bashkortostan =

Karakashly Каракашлы
- Village
- Location within Bashkortostan Location within Russia
- Coordinates: 54°45′N 53°43′E
- Country: Russia
- Region: Bashkortostan
- District: Sharansky District
- Time zone: UTC+5:00

Karakashly (Russian: Каракашлы; Bashkir: Ҡараҡашлы, Qaraqaşlı) is a rural locality (a village) in Dyurtyulinsky Selsoviet, Sharansky District, Bashkortostan, Russia. The population was 61 as of 2010. There is 1 street.

== Geography ==
Karakashly is located 26 km southwest of Sharan (the district's administrative centre) by road. Yeremkino is the nearest rural locality.
