= Zirikly, Sharansky District, Republic of Bashkortostan =

Zirikly Зириклы
- Selo
- Location within Bashkortostan Location within Russia
- Coordinates: 54°50′N 53°46′E
- Country: Russia
- Region: Bashkortostan
- District: Sharansky District
- Time zone: UTC+5:00

Zirikly (Russian: Зириклы; Bashkir: Ерекле, Yerekle) is a rural locality (a selo) and the administrative centre of Ziriklinsky Selsoviet, Sharansky District, Bashkortostan, Russia. The population was 835 as of 2010. There are 7 streets.

== Geography ==
Zirikly is located 21 km northwest of Sharan (the district's administrative centre) by road. Sharlykbash is the nearest rural locality.
