= Sarsaz, Sharansky District, Republic of Bashkortostan =

Sarsaz Сарсаз
- Village
- Location within Bashkortostan Location within Russia
- Coordinates: 54°47′N 53°50′E
- Country: Russia
- Region: Bashkortostan
- District: Sharansky District
- Time zone: UTC+5:00

Sarsaz (Russian: Сарсаз; Bashkir: Һарыһаҙ, Harıhaź) is a rural locality (a village) in Dyurtyulinsky Selsoviet, Sharansky District, Bashkortostan, Russia. The population was 273 as of 2010. There are 6 streets in the locality.

== Geography ==
Sarsaz is located 13 km southwest of Sharan (the district's administrative centre) by road. Tat-Kuchuk is the nearest rural locality.
