= Bolshaya Ustyuba =

Bolshaya Ustyuba Большая Устюба
- Selo
- Location within Bashkortostan Location within Russia
- Coordinates: 54°34′N 54°22′E
- Country: Russia
- Region: Bashkortostan
- District: Buzdyaksky District
- Time zone: UTC+5:00

Bolshaya Ustyuba (Russian: Большая Устюба; Bashkir: Оло Өстүбә, Olo Östübä) is a rural locality (a selo) in Kopey-Kubovsky Selsoviet, Buzdyaksky District, Bashkortostan, Russia. The population was 345 as of 2010. There are 5 streets.

== Geography ==
Bolshaya Ustyuba is located 14 km west of Buzdyak (the district's administrative centre) by road. Ishtiryak is the nearest rural locality.
