= Batyrsha-Kubovo =

Batyrsha-Kubovo Батырша-Кубово
- Selo
- Location within Bashkortostan Location within Russia
- Coordinates: 54°28′N 54°20′E
- Country: Russia
- Region: Bashkortostan
- District: Buzdyaksky District
- Time zone: UTC+5:00

Batyrsha-Kubovo (Russian: Батырша-Кубово; Bashkir: Батырша-Ҡобау, Batırşa-Qobaw) is a rural locality (a selo) in Kopey-Kubovsky Selsoviet, Buzdyaksky District, Bashkortostan, Russia. The population was 330 as of 2010. There are 5 streets.

== Geography ==
Batyrsha-Kubovo is located 22 km southwest of Buzdyak (the district's administrative centre) by road. Kazaklar-Kubovo is the nearest rural locality.
