= Staroaktau =

Staroaktau Староактау
- Selo
- Location within Bashkortostan Location within Russia
- Coordinates: 54°42′N 54°27′E
- Country: Russia
- Region: Bashkortostan
- District: Buzdyaksky District
- Time zone: UTC+5:00

Staroaktau (Russian: Староактау; Bashkir: Иҫке Аҡтау, İśke Aqtaw) is a rural locality (a selo) in Karansky Selsoviet, Buzdyaksky District, Bashkortostan, Russia. The population was 303 as of 2010. There are 6 streets.

== Geography ==
Staroaktau is located 23 km north of Buzdyak (the district's administrative centre) by road. Uranovo is the nearest rural locality.
