= Shlanlykulevo =

Shlanlykulevo Шланлыкулево
- Village
- Location within Bashkortostan Location within Russia
- Coordinates: 54°35′N 54°26′E
- Country: Russia
- Region: Bashkortostan
- District: Buzdyaksky District
- Time zone: UTC+5:00

Shlanlykulevo (Russian: Шланлыкулево; Bashkir: Шланлыкүл, Şlanlıkül) is a rural locality (a village) in Arslanovsky Selsoviet, Buzdyaksky District, Bashkortostan, Russia. The population was 251 as of 2010.

== Geography ==
Shlanlykulevo is located 10 km northwest of Buzdyak (the district's administrative centre) by road. Starye Bogady is the nearest rural locality.
