= Karan, Buzdyaksky District, Republic of Bashkortostan =

Karan Каран
- Selo
- Location within Bashkortostan Location within Russia
- Coordinates: 54°41′N 54°29′E
- Country: Russia
- Region: Bashkortostan
- District: Buzdyaksky District
- Time zone: UTC+5:00

Karan (Russian: Каран; Bashkir: Ҡаран, Qaran) is a rural locality (a selo) and the administrative centre of Karansky Selsoviet, Buzdyaksky District, Bashkortostan, Russia. The population was 358 as of 2010. There are 5 streets.

== Geography ==
Karan is located 18 km north of Buzdyak (the district's administrative centre) by road. Uranovo is the nearest rural locality.
