= Syrtlanovo =

Syrtlanovo Сыртланово
- Village
- Location within Bashkortostan Location within Russia
- Coordinates: 54°32′N 54°39′E
- Country: Russia
- Region: Bashkortostan
- District: Buzdyaksky District
- Time zone: UTC+5:00

Syrtlanovo (Russian: Сыртланово; Bashkir: Сыртлан, Sırtlan) is a rural locality (a village) in Gafuriysky Selsoviet, Buzdyaksky District, Bashkortostan, Russia. The population was 35 as of 2010. There is 1 street.

== Geography ==
Syrtlanovo is located 9 km southeast of Buzdyak (the district's administrative centre) by road. Gafuri is the nearest rural locality.
