= Novoyuzeyevo =

Novoyuzeyevo Новоюзеево
- Selo
- Location within Bashkortostan Location within Russia
- Coordinates: 54°58′N 53°44′E
- Country: Russia
- Region: Bashkortostan
- District: Sharansky District
- Time zone: UTC+5:00

Novoyuzeyevo (Russian: Новоюзеево; Bashkir: Яңы Йүзәй, Yañı Yüzäy) is a rural locality (a selo) in Nizhnetashlinsky Selsoviet, Sharansky District, Bashkortostan, Russia. The population was 119 as of 2010. There are 3 streets.

== Geography ==
Novoyuzeyevo is located 37 km northwest of Sharan (the district's administrative centre) by road. Ustyumovo is the nearest rural locality.
