= Kartamak =

Kartamak Картамак
- Selo
- Location within Bashkortostan Location within Russia
- Coordinates: 54°48′N 54°28′E
- Country: Russia
- Region: Bashkortostan
- District: Buzdyaksky District
- Time zone: UTC+5:00

Kartamak (Russian: Картамак; Bashkir: Ҡартамаҡ, Qartamaq) is a rural locality (a selo) in Tavlarovsky Selsoviet, Buzdyaksky District, Bashkortostan, Russia. The population was 283 as of 2010. There are 4 streets. The village having only one shop.

== Geography ==
Kartamak is located 32 km north of Buzdyak (the district's administrative centre) by road. Stary Karbash is the nearest rural locality.
