= Kyzyl-Yelga =

Kyzyl-Yelga Кызыл-Елга
- Village
- Location within Bashkortostan Location within Russia
- Coordinates: 54°43′N 54°19′E
- Country: Russia
- Region: Bashkortostan
- District: Buzdyaksky District
- Time zone: UTC+5:00

Kyzyl-Yelga (Russian: Кызыл-Елга; Bashkir: Ҡыҙылйылға, Qıźılyılğa) is a rural locality (a village) in Arslanovsky Selsoviet, Buzdyaksky District, Bashkortostan, Russia. The population was 27 as of 2010. There is 1 street.

== Geography ==
Kyzyl-Yelga is located 29 km northwest of Buzdyak (the district's administrative centre) by road. Urzaybash is the nearest rural locality.
