= Bakcha =

Bakcha Бакча
- Village
- Location within Bashkortostan Location within Russia
- Coordinates: 54°56′N 54°34′E
- Country: Russia
- Region: Bashkortostan
- District: Buzdyaksky District
- Time zone: UTC+5:00

Bakcha (Russian: Бакча; Bashkir: Баҡса, Baqsa) is a rural locality (a village) in Tyuryushevsky Selsoviet, Buzdyaksky District, Bashkortostan, Russia. The population was 4 as of 2010. There is 1 street.

== Geography ==
Bakcha is located 43 km north of Buzdyak (the district's administrative centre) by road. Biyek is the nearest rural locality.
