= Sungurovka =

Sungurovka Сунгуровка
- Village
- Location within Bashkortostan Location within Russia
- Coordinates: 55°00′N 53°57′E
- Country: Russia
- Region: Bashkortostan
- District: Sharansky District
- Time zone: UTC+5:00

Sungurovka (Russian: Сунгуровка; Bashkir: Соңғор, Soñğor) is a rural locality (a village) in Pisarevsky Selsoviet, Sharansky District, Bashkortostan, Russia. The population was 4 as of 2010. There is 1 street.

== Geography ==
Sungurovka is located 28 km north of Sharan (the district's administrative centre) by road. Pisarevo is the nearest rural locality.
