= Novochikeyevo =

Novochikeyevo Новочикеево
- Village
- Location within Bashkortostan Location within Russia
- Coordinates: 55°01′N 54°11′E
- Country: Russia
- Region: Bashkortostan
- District: Sharansky District
- Time zone: UTC+5:00

Novochikeyevo (Russian: Новочикеево; Bashkir: Яңы Сикәй, Yañı Sikäy) is a rural locality (a village) in Michurinsky Selsoviet, Sharansky District, Bashkortostan, Russia. The population was 34 as of 2010. There is 1 street.

== Geography ==
Novochikeyevo is located 32 km northeast of Sharan (the district's administrative centre) by road. Papanovka is the nearest rural locality.
