= Timirovo, Sharansky District, Republic of Bashkortostan =

Timirovo Тимирово
- Village
- Location within Bashkortostan Location within Russia
- Coordinates: 54°56′N 54°12′E
- Country: Russia
- Region: Bashkortostan
- District: Sharansky District
- Time zone: UTC+5:00

Timirovo (Russian: Тимирово; Bashkir: Тимер, Timer) is a rural locality (a village) in Michurinsky Selsoviet, Sharansky District, Bashkortostan, Russia. The population was 83 as of 2010. There is 1 street.

== Geography ==
Timirovo is located 23 km northeast of Sharan (the district's administrative centre) by road. Novoyumashevo is the nearest rural locality.
