= Kopey-Kubovo =

Kopey-Kubovo Копей-Кубово
- Selo
- Location within Bashkortostan Location within Russia
- Coordinates: 54°31′N 54°22′E
- Country: Russia
- Region: Bashkortostan
- District: Buzdyaksky District
- Time zone: UTC+5:00

Kopey-Kubovo (Russian: Копей-Кубово; Bashkir: Кәпәй-Ҡобау, Käpäy-Qobaw) is a rural locality (a selo) and the administrative centre of Kopey-Kubovsky Selsoviet, Buzdyaksky District, Bashkortostan, Russia. The population was 949 as of 2010. The locality includes seven streets.

== Geography ==
Kopey-Kubovo is located 19 km southwest of Buzdyak (the district's administrative centre) by road. Karanbash is the nearest rural locality.
