= Pisarevo =

Pisarevo Писарево
- Village
- Location within Bashkortostan Location within Russia
- Coordinates: 54°58′N 53°56′E
- Country: Russia
- Region: Bashkortostan
- District: Sharansky District
- Time zone: UTC+5:00

Pisarevo (Russian: Писарево) is a rural locality (a village) and the administrative centre of Pisarevsky Selsoviet, Sharansky District, Bashkortostan, Russia. The population was 288 as of 2010. There are 6 streets.

== Geography ==
Pisarevo is located 23 km north of Sharan (the district's administrative centre) by road. Roshcha is the nearest rural locality.
