= Novoknyazevo =

Novoknyazevo Новокнязево
- Village
- Location within Bashkortostan Location within Russia
- Coordinates: 54°59′N 54°03′E
- Country: Russia
- Region: Bashkortostan
- District: Sharansky District
- Time zone: UTC+5:00

Novoknyazevo (Russian: Новокнязево) is a rural locality (a village) in Pisarevsky Selsoviet, Sharansky District, Bashkortostan, Russia. The population was 105 as of 2010. There is 1 street.

== Geography ==
Novoknyazevo is located 31 km north of Sharan (the district's administrative centre) by road. Sakty is the nearest rural locality.
