= Dyurtyuli, Sharansky District, Republic of Bashkortostan =

Dyurtyuli Дюртюли
- Selo
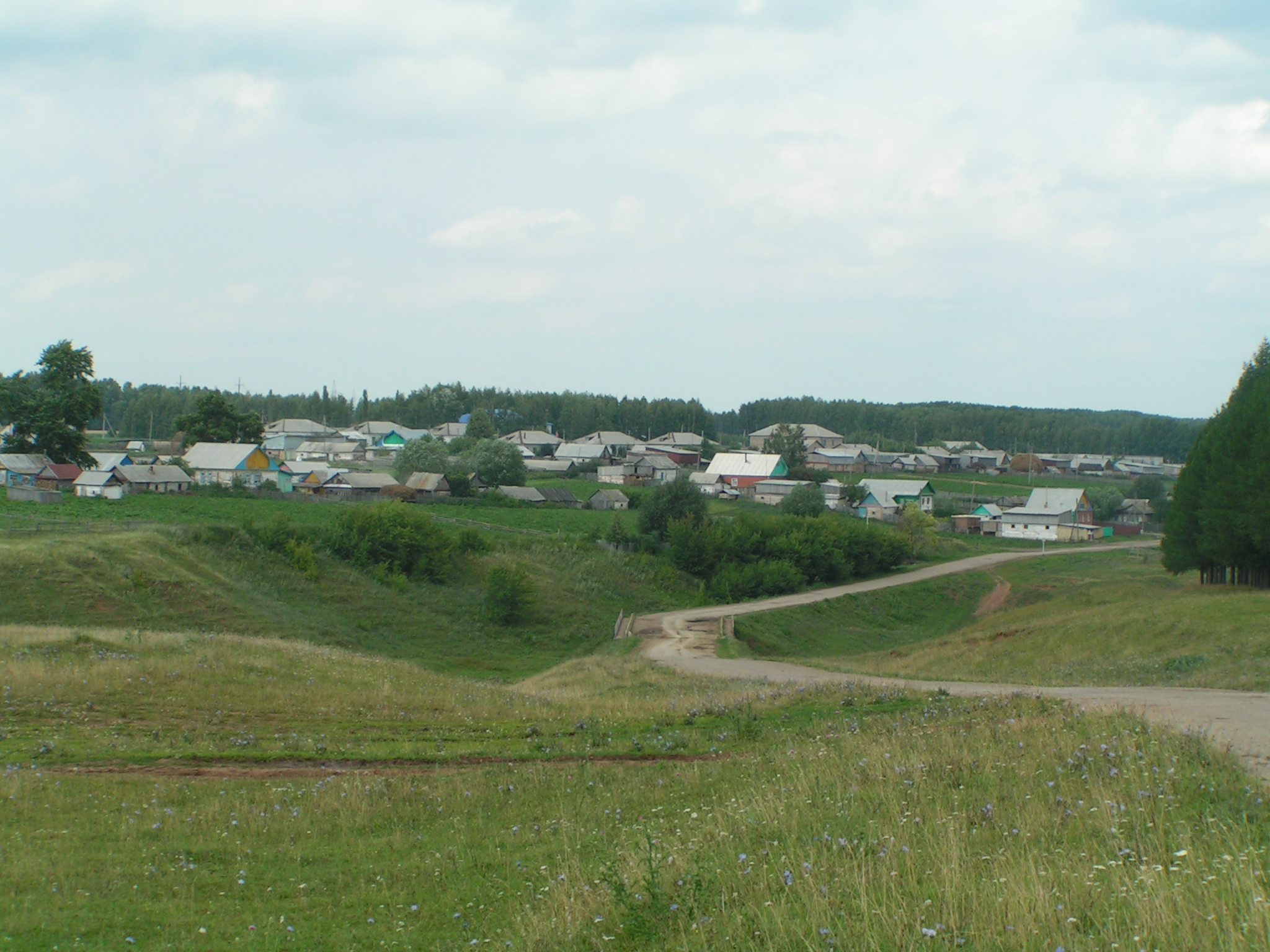

- Location within Bashkortostan Location within Russia
- Coordinates: 54°45′N 53°47′E
- Country: Russia
- Region: Bashkortostan
- District: Sharansky District
- Time zone: UTC+5:00 (CET)

Dyurtyuli (Russian: Дюртюли; Bashkir: Дүртөйлө, Dürtöylö) is a rural locality (a selo) and the administrative centre of Dyurtyulinsky Selsoviet, Sharansky District, Bashkortostan, Russia. The population was 582 as of 2010. There are 6 streets.

== Geography ==
Dyurtyuli is located 23 km southwest of Sharan (the district's administrative centre) by road. Yeremkino is the nearest rural locality.
