= Dyurtyuli, Karaidelsky District, Republic of Bashkortostan =

Dyurtyuli Дюртюли
- Village
- Location within Bashkortostan Location within Russia
- Coordinates: 55°38′N 57°05′E
- Country: Russia
- Region: Bashkortostan
- District: Karaidelsky District
- Time zone: UTC+5:00

Dyurtyuli (Russian: Дюртюли; Bashkir: Дүртөйлө, Dürtöylö) is a rural locality (a village) in Novoberdyashsky Selsoviet, Karaidelsky District, Bashkortostan, Russia. The population was 29 as of 2010. There is 1 street.

== Geography ==
Dyurtyuli is located 39 km southeast of Karaidel (the district's administrative centre) by road. Kadysi is the nearest rural locality.
