= Dyurtyuli, Davlekanovsky District, Republic of Bashkortostan =

Dyurtyuli Дюртюли
- Selo
- Location within Bashkortostan Location within Russia
- Coordinates: 54°08′N 55°04′E
- Country: Russia
- Region: Bashkortostan
- District: Davlekanovsky District
- Time zone: UTC+5:00

Dyurtyuli (Russian: Дюртюли; Bashkir: Дүртөйлө, Dürtöylö) is a rural locality (a selo) and the administrative centre of Kurmankeyevsky Selsoviet, Davlekanovsky District, Bashkortostan, Russia. The population was 317 as of 2010. There are 4 streets.

== Geography ==
Dyurtyuli is located 12 km southeast of Davlekanovo (the district's administrative centre) by road. Ibrayevo is the nearest rural locality.
