= Buzdyaksky District =

Buzdyaksky District Буздякский район (Russian)
- District

Other transcription(s)
  - Bashkir: Бүздәк районы
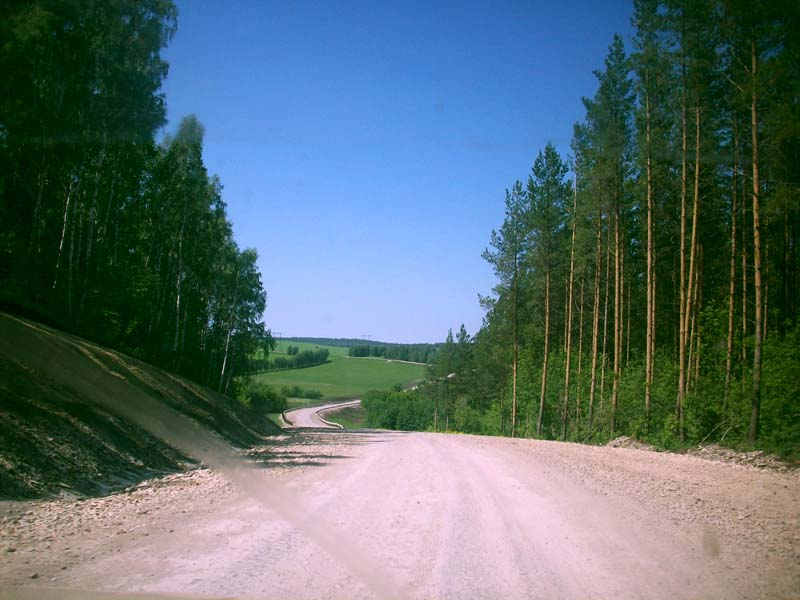
- Road in Buzdyaksky District

- Flag Coat of arms
- Location of Buzdyaksky District in the Republic of Bashkortostan
- Coordinates: 54°34′N 54°32′E
- Country: Russia
- Federal subject: Republic of Bashkortostan
- Established: August 20, 1930
- Administrative center: Buzdyak

Area
  - Total: 1,632.8 km^{2} (630.4 sq mi)

Population (2010 Census)
  - Total: 30,688
  - Density: 18.795/km^{2} (48.678/sq mi)
  - Urban: 0%
  - Rural: 100%

Administrative structure
  - Administrative divisions: 12 Selsoviets
  - Inhabited localities: 82 rural localities

Municipal structure
  - Municipally incorporated as: Buzdyaksky Municipal District
  - Municipal divisions: 0 urban settlements, 12 rural settlements
- Time zone: UTC+5 (MSK+2)
- OKTMO ID: 80617000
- Website: https://buzdyak.bashkortostan.ru/

Population of Buzdyaksky District
- 2010 Census: 30,688
- 2002 Census: 31,178
- 1989 Census: 30,334
- 1979 Census: 33,758

Buzdyaksky District (Russian: Буздя́кский райо́н; Bashkir and Tatar: Бүздәк районы, Büzdäk rayonı) is an administrative and municipal district (raion), one of the fifty-four in the Republic of Bashkortostan, Russia. It is located in the west of the republic and borders with Chekmagushevsky District in the north, Blagovarsky District in the east, Davlekanovsky District in the southeast, Belebeyevsky District in the south, Tuymazinsky District in the southwest and west, and with Sharansky District in the west and northwest. The area of the district is 1,632.8 square kilometers (630.4 sq mi). Its administrative center is the rural locality (a selo) of Buzdyak. As of the 2010 Census, the total population of the district was 30,688, with the population of Buzdyak accounting for 33.6% of that number.

== History ==
The district was established on August 20, 1930.

== Administrative and municipal status ==
Within the framework of administrative divisions, Buzdyaksky District is one of the fifty-four in the Republic of Bashkortostan. The district is divided into twelve selsoviets, comprising eighty-two rural localities. As a municipal division, the district is incorporated as Buzdyaksky Municipal District. Its twelve selsoviets are incorporated as twelve rural settlements within the municipal district. The selo of Buzdyak serves as the administrative center of both the administrative and municipal district.
