= Buzdyak =

Buzdyak Буздяк
- Selo

Other transcription(s)
  - Bashkir: Бүздәк
- Interactive map of Buzdyak
- Location of Buzdyak Buzdyak (Bashkortostan)
- Coordinates: 54°34′0″N 54°31′51″E
- Country: Russia
- Federal subject: Bashkortostan
- Administrative district: Buzdyaksky District
- SelsovietSelsoviet: Buzdyaksky Selsoviet

Population (2010 Census)
  - Total: 10,323
  - Estimate (1 January 1937): 2,262 (−78.1%)

Administrative status
  - Capital of: Buzdyaksky District, Buzdyaksky Selsoviet

Municipal status
  - Municipal district: Buzdyaksky Municipal District
  - Rural settlement: Buzdyaksky Selsoviet Rural Settlement
  - Capital of: Buzdyaksky Municipal District, Buzdyaksky Selsoviet Rural Settlement
- Time zone: UTC+5 (MSK+2)
- Postal code: 452710
- OKTMO ID: 80617407101

Buzdyak (Russian: Буздяк, Bashkir: Бүздәк, Büzdäk) is a rural locality (a selo) and the administrative center of Buzdyaksky District in Republic of Bashkortostan, Russia. Its population was 10,323 (2010 census); 9,733 (2002 census); 8,719 (1989 Soviet census).

== History ==
Buzdyak was originally named Kanlytyuba during its settlement by the Bashkirs of the Kanlinsky volost. The name later changed to Toruyino, where in 1738 the Bashir-Canlinian Buzdyak Ishembetov lived, by whose name this village is known today.

Before the construction of the Inza railway Chishmy line (1910-1912) existed the Misharsky village of Tabanlykul. Initially the railway was supposed to head north through southern Buzdyak (now Old Buzdyak), however, a group of deputies of the state Duma of the third convocation, primarily Gaisa Enikeev, made a change in the project. As a result the branch ran 4 kilometers south from the initial plan, through the dried lake Tabanlykul and further near the clan village of Enikeev Kargaly. The station that arose on the site of Tabanlykul received the name Buzdyak, and the village thus became known as Buzdyak.

In February 1942, at the Buzdyak railway station, the 1097th, 1098th cannon-artillery, 121st, 122nd, and 123rd mortar regiments were formed.
