= Sharan, Russia =

Sharan Шаран
- Selo
- Interactive map of Sharan
- Location of Sharan Sharan (Bashkortostan)
- Coordinates: 54°49′09″N 53°59′35″E
- Country: Russia
- Federal subject: Bashkortostan
- Administrative district: Sharansky District

Population (2010 Census)
  - Total: 5,929
  - Estimate (2010): 5,929 (0%)

Administrative status
  - Capital of: Sharansky District
- Time zone: UTC+5 (MSK+2)
- Postal code: 452630
- OKTMO ID: 80658485101

Sharan (Russian: Шара́н; Bashkir: Шаран, Şaran) is a rural locality (a selo) and the administrative center of Sharansky District of the Republic of Bashkortostan, Russia. Population: 5,929 (2010 census); 5,544 (2002 census); 4,734 (1989 Soviet census).
