= Sharansky District =

Sharansky District Шаранский район (Russian)
- District

Other transcription(s)
  - Bashkir: Шаран районы
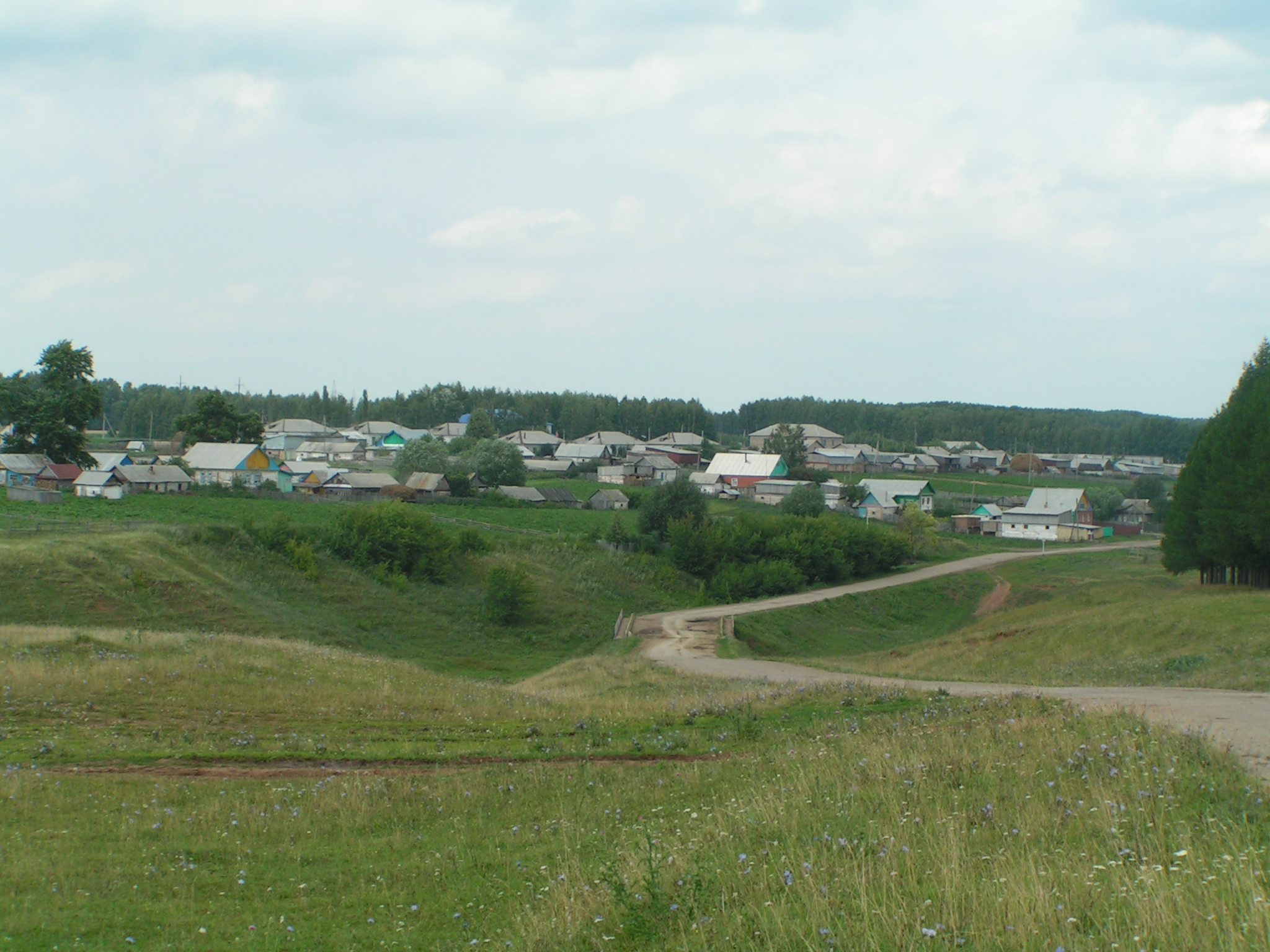
- The selo of Dyurtyuli in Sharansky District

- Flag Coat of arms
- Location of Sharansky District in the Republic of Bashkortostan
- Coordinates: 54°49′N 54°00′E
- Country: Russia
- Federal subject: Republic of Bashkortostan
- Established: January 31, 1935
- Administrative center: Sharan

Area
  - Total: 1,384 km^{2} (534 sq mi)

Population (2010 Census)
  - Total: 22,514
  - Estimate (2018): 20,303 (−9.8%)
  - Density: 16.27/km^{2} (42.13/sq mi)
  - Urban: 0%
  - Rural: 100%

Administrative structure
  - Administrative divisions: 13 Selsoviets
  - Inhabited localities: 103 rural localities

Municipal structure
  - Municipally incorporated as: Sharansky Municipal District
  - Municipal divisions: 0 urban settlements, 13 rural settlements
- Time zone: UTC+5 (MSK+2)
- OKTMO ID: 80658000
- Website: http://www.sharanrb.ru

Population of Sharansky District
- 2010 Census: 22,514
- 2002 Census: 24,494
- 1989 Census: 23,889
- 1979 Census: 28,900

Sharansky District (Russian: Шара́нский райо́н; Bashkir: Шаран районы, Şaran rayonı) is an administrative and municipal district (raion), one of the fifty-four in the Republic of Bashkortostan, Russia. It is located in the west of the republic and borders with Bakalinsky District in the northwest and north, Chekmagushevsky District in the northeast, Buzdyaksky District in the southeast, Tuymazinsky District in the south, and with the Republic of Tatarstan in the west. The area of the district is 1,384 square kilometers (534 sq mi). Its administrative center is the rural locality (a selo) of Sharan. As of the 2010 Census, the total population of the district was 22,514, with the population of Sharan accounting for 26.3% of that number.

== History ==
The district was established on January 31, 1935, when it was split from Tuymazinsky District.

== Administrative and municipal status ==
Within the framework of administrative divisions, Sharansky District is one of the fifty-four in the Republic of Bashkortostan. The district is divided into 13 selsoviets, comprising 103 rural localities. As a municipal division, the district is incorporated as Sharansky Municipal District. Its thirteen selsoviets are incorporated as thirteen rural settlements within the municipal district. The selo of Sharan serves as the administrative center of both the administrative and municipal district.
