= Romadanovka =

Romadanovka Ромадановка
- Selo
- Location within Bashkortostan Location within Russia
- Coordinates: 53°13′N 56°13′E
- Country: Russia
- Region: Bashkortostan
- District: Ishimbaysky District
- Time zone: UTC+5:00

Romadanovka (Russian: Ромадановка) is a rural locality (a selo) in Verkhotorsky Selsoviet, Ishimbaysky District, Bashkortostan, Russia. The population was 176 as of 2010. There are 3 streets.

== Geography ==
Romadanovka is located 32 km southeast of Ishimbay (the district's administrative centre) by road. Kuznetsovsky is the nearest rural locality.
