= Bayguzino =

Bayguzino Байгузино
- Village
- Location within Bashkortostan Location within Russia
- Coordinates: 53°25′N 56°08′E
- Country: Russia
- Region: Bashkortostan
- District: Ishimbaysky District
- Time zone: UTC+5:00

Bayguzino (Russian: Байгу́зино; Bashkir: Байғужа, Bayğuja) is a rural locality (a village) in Bayguzinsky Selsoviet, Ishimbaysky District, Bashkortostan, Russia. The population was 504 as of 2010. There are 9 streets.

== Geography ==
Bayguzino is located 11 km southeast of Ishimbay (the district's administrative centre) by road. Kinzebulatovo is the nearest rural locality.
