= Urman (disambiguation) =

Urman, Ukraine is a village in Ternopil Raion of Ternopil Oblast.

Urman may also refer to:

== Places ==
- Urman, Bakalinsky District, Republic of Bashkortostan, Russia
- Urman, Iglinsky District, Republic of Bashkortostan, Russia
- Urman, Nurimanovsky District, Republic of Bashkortostan, Russia
- Urman-Asty, Dyurtyulinsky District, Republic of Bashkortostan, Russia
- Urman-Bishkadak, Ishimbaysky District, Republic of Bashkortostan, Russia
- Urman, Suwayda, town in Syria

== People ==
- Jennie Snyder Urman (born 1975), American television producer
- Mark Urman (1952–2019), American film executive, producer and distributor
