= Kashalakbash =

Kashalakbash Кашалакбаш
- Khutor
- Location within Bashkortostan Location within Russia
- Coordinates: 53°25′N 56°16′E
- Country: Russia
- Region: Bashkortostan
- District: Ishimbaysky District
- Time zone: UTC+5:00

Kashalakbash (Russian: Кашалакбаш; Bashkir: Кәшәләкбаш, Käşäläkbaş) is a rural locality (a khutor) in Bayguzinsky Selsoviet, Ishimbaysky District, Bashkortostan, Russia. The population was 58 as of 2010. There are 3 streets.

== Geography ==
Kashalakbash is located 23 km southeast of Ishimbay (the district's administrative centre) by road. Anikeyevsky is the nearest rural locality.
