= Yangi-Aul, Ishimbaysky District, Republic of Bashkortostan =

Yangi-Aul Янги-Аул
- Village
- Location within Bashkortostan Location within Russia
- Coordinates: 53°37′N 56°03′E
- Country: Russia
- Region: Bashkortostan
- District: Ishimbaysky District
- Time zone: UTC+5:00

Yangi-Aul (Russian: Янги-Аул; Bashkir: Яңауыл, Yañawıl) is a rural locality (a village) in Isheyevsky Selsoviet, Ishimbaysky District, Bashkortostan, Russia. The population was 116 as of 2010. There are 4 streets.

== Geography ==
Yangi-Aul is located 22 km north of Ishimbay (the district's administrative centre) by road. Vostok is the nearest rural locality.
