= Biksyanovo =

Biksyanovo Биксяново
- Village
- Location within Bashkortostan Location within Russia
- Coordinates: 53°27′N 56°19′E
- Country: Russia
- Region: Bashkortostan
- District: Ishimbaysky District
- Time zone: UTC+5:00

Biksyanovo (Russian: Биксяново; Bashkir: Биксән, Biksän) is a rural locality (a village) in Sayranovsky Selsoviet, Ishimbaysky District, Bashkortostan, Russia. The population was 513 as of 2010. There are 8 streets.

== Geography ==
Biksyanovo is located 28 km east of Ishimbay (the district's administrative centre) by road. Novoaptikovo is the nearest rural locality.
