= Kyzyl Oktyabr =

Kyzyl Oktyabr Кызыл Октябрь
- Village
- Location within Bashkortostan Location within Russia
- Coordinates: 53°31′N 56°28′E
- Country: Russia
- Region: Bashkortostan
- District: Ishimbaysky District
- Time zone: UTC+5:00

Kyzyl Oktyabr (Russian: Кызыл Октябрь; Bashkir: Ҡыҙыл Октябрь, Qıźıl Oktyabr) is a rural locality (a village) in Kuzyanovsky Selsoviet, Ishimbaysky District, Bashkortostan, Russia. The population was 40 as of 2010. There is 1 street.

== Geography ==
Kyzyl Oktyabr is located 47 km northeast of Ishimbay (the district's administrative centre) by road. Iksisyakovo is the nearest rural locality.
