= Novoivanovka, Ishimbaysky District, Republic of Bashkortostan =

Novoivanovka Новоивановка
- Village
- Location within Bashkortostan Location within Russia
- Coordinates: 53°29′N 56°09′E
- Country: Russia
- Region: Bashkortostan
- District: Ishimbaysky District
- Time zone: UTC+5:00

Novoivanovka (Russian: Новоивановка) is a rural locality (a village) in Urman-Bishkadaksky Selsoviet, Ishimbaysky District, Bashkortostan, Russia. The population was 51 as of 2010. There are 2 streets.

== Geography ==
Novoivanovka is located 14 km northeast of Ishimbay (the district's administrative centre) by road. Novogeorgiyevka is the nearest rural locality.
