= Ibrayevo, Ishimbaysky District, Republic of Bashkortostan =

Ibrayevo Ибраево
- Village
- Location within Bashkortostan Location within Russia
- Coordinates: 53°39′N 56°34′E
- Country: Russia
- Region: Bashkortostan
- District: Ishimbaysky District
- Time zone: UTC+5:00

Ibrayevo (Russian: Ибраево; Bashkir: Ибрай, İbray) is a rural locality (a village) in Makarovsky Selsoviet, Ishimbaysky District, Bashkortostan, Russia. The population was 134 as of 2010. There are 2 streets.

== Geography ==
Ibrayevo is located 51 km northeast of Ishimbay (the district's administrative centre) by road. Isyakayevo is the nearest rural locality.
