= Kalu-Ayry =

Kalu-Ayry Калу-Айры
- Village
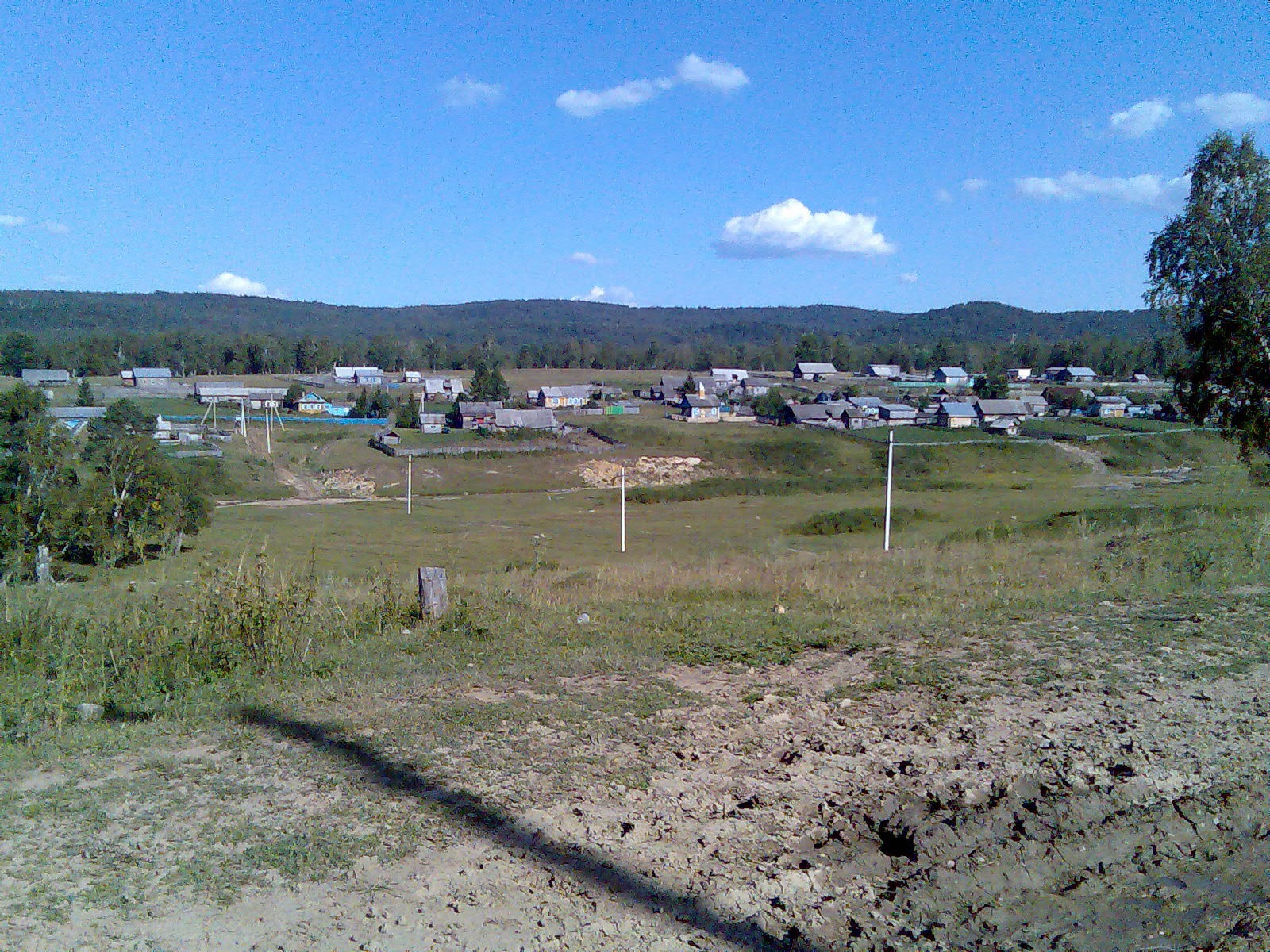

- Location within Bashkortostan Location within Russia
- Coordinates: 53°31′N 56°57′E
- Country: Russia
- Region: Bashkortostan
- District: Ishimbaysky District
- Time zone: UTC+5:00

Kalu-Ayry (Russian: Калу-Айры; Bashkir: Ҡалыуайыры, Qalıwayırı) is a rural locality (a village) in Kulguninsky Selsoviet, Ishimbaysky District, Bashkortostan, Russia. The population was 149 as of 2010. There are 2 streets.

== Geography ==
Kalu-Ayry is located 87 km east of Ishimbay (the district's administrative centre) by road. Kulgunino is the nearest rural locality.
