= Yasheltau =

Yasheltau Яшельтау
- Village
- Location within Bashkortostan Location within Russia
- Coordinates: 53°14′N 55°58′E
- Country: Russia
- Region: Bashkortostan
- District: Ishimbaysky District
- Time zone: UTC+5:00

Yasheltau (Russian: Яшельтау; Bashkir: Йәшелтау, Yäşeltaw) is a rural locality (a village) in Skvorchikhinsky Selsoviet, Ishimbaysky District, Bashkortostan, Russia. The population was 9 as of 2010. There are 2 streets.

== Geography ==
Yasheltau is located on the right bank of the Belaya River, 34 km south of Ishimbay (the district's administrative centre) by road. Sabashevo is the nearest rural locality.
