= Bolshebaikovo =

Bolshebaikovo Большебаиково
- Village
- Location within Bashkortostan Location within Russia
- Coordinates: 53°22′N 56°09′E
- Country: Russia
- Region: Bashkortostan
- District: Ishimbaysky District
- Time zone: UTC+5:00

Bolshebaikovo (Russian: Большебаиково; Bashkir: Оло Байыҡ, Olo Bayıq) is a rural locality (a village) in Bayguzinsky Selsoviet, Ishimbaysky District, Bashkortostan, Russia. The population was 52 as of 2010. There are 2 streets.

== Geography ==
Bolshebaikovo is located 16 km southeast of Ishimbay (the district's administrative centre) by road. Kyzyl-Yulduz is the nearest rural locality.
