= Asiyalan =

Asiyalan Асиялан
- Village
- Location within Bashkortostan Location within Russia
- Coordinates: 53°19′N 56°28′E
- Country: Russia
- Region: Bashkortostan
- District: Ishimbaysky District
- Time zone: UTC+5:00

Asiyalan (Russian: Асиялан; Bashkir: Әсеялан, Äseyalan) is a rural locality (a village) in Itkulovsky Selsoviet, Ishimbaysky District, Bashkortostan, Russia. The population was 44 as of 2010. There are 4 streets.

== Geography ==
Asiyalan is located 41 km southeast of Ishimbay (the district's administrative centre) by road. Urazbayevo is the nearest rural locality.
