= Anikeyevsky =

Anikeyevsky Аникеевский
- Village
- Location within Bashkortostan Location within Russia
- Coordinates: 53°25′N 56°14′E
- Country: Russia
- Region: Bashkortostan
- District: Ishimbaysky District
- Time zone: UTC+5:00

Anikeyevsky (Russian: Аникеевский) is a rural locality (a village) in Bayguzinsky Selsoviet, Ishimbaysky District, Bashkortostan, Russia. The population was 12 as of 2010. There is 1 street.

== Geography ==
Anikeyevsky is located 25 km east of Ishimbay (the district's administrative centre) by road. Kashalakbash is the nearest rural locality.
