= Yuldashevo, Ishimbaysky District, Republic of Bashkortostan =

Yuldashevo Юлдашево
- Village
- Location within Bashkortostan Location within Russia
- Coordinates: 53°19′N 56°01′E
- Country: Russia
- Region: Bashkortostan
- District: Ishimbaysky District
- Time zone: UTC+5:00

Yuldashevo (Russian: Юлдашево; Bashkir: Юлдаш, Yuldaş) is a rural locality (a village) in Skvorchikhinsky Selsoviet, Ishimbaysky District, Bashkortostan, Russia. The population was 16 as of 2010. There is 1 street.

== Geography ==
Yuldashevo is located 16 km south of Ishimbay (the district's administrative centre) by road. Mikhaylovka is the nearest rural locality.
