= Kiyaukovo =

Kiyaukovo Кияуково
- Village
- Location within Bashkortostan Location within Russia
- Coordinates: 53°40′N 56°19′E
- Country: Russia
- Region: Bashkortostan
- District: Ishimbaysky District
- Time zone: UTC+5:00

Kiyaukovo (Russian: Кияуково; Bashkir: Ҡыяуыҡ, Qıyawıq) is a rural locality (a village) in Yanurusovsky Selsoviet, Ishimbaysky District, Bashkortostan, Russia. The population was 146 as of 2010. There are 2 streets.

== Geography ==
Kiyaukovo is located 51 km northeast of Ishimbay (the district's administrative centre) by road. Yanurusovo is the nearest rural locality.
