= Karasyovka =

Karasyovka Карасёвка
- Village
- Location within Bashkortostan Location within Russia
- Coordinates: 53°39′N 56°05′E
- Country: Russia
- Region: Bashkortostan
- District: Ishimbaysky District
- Time zone: UTC+5:00

Karasyovka (Russian: Карасёвка) is a rural locality (a village) in Isheyevsky Selsoviet, Ishimbaysky District, Bashkortostan, Russia. The population was 70 as of 2010. There are 8 streets.

== Geography ==
Karasyovka is located 29 km north of Ishimbay (the district's administrative centre) by road. Urnyak is the nearest rural locality.
