= Aptikovo =

Aptikovo Аптиково
- Village
- Location within Bashkortostan Location within Russia
- Coordinates: 53°29′N 56°16′E
- Country: Russia
- Region: Bashkortostan
- District: Ishimbaysky District
- Time zone: UTC+5:00

Aptikovo (Russian: Аптиково; Bashkir: Әптек, Äptek) is a rural locality (a village) in Urman-Bishkadaksky Selsoviet, Ishimbaysky District, Bashkortostan, Russia. The population was 243 as of 2010. There are 3 streets.

== Geography ==
Aptikovo is located 23 km east of Ishimbay (the district's administrative centre) by road. Novoaptikovo is the nearest rural locality.
