= Novogeorgiyevka, Ishimbaysky District, Republic of Bashkortostan =

Novogeorgiyevka Новогеоргиевка
- Village
- Location within Bashkortostan Location within Russia
- Coordinates: 53°30′N 56°07′E
- Country: Russia
- Region: Bashkortostan
- District: Ishimbaysky District
- Time zone: UTC+5:00

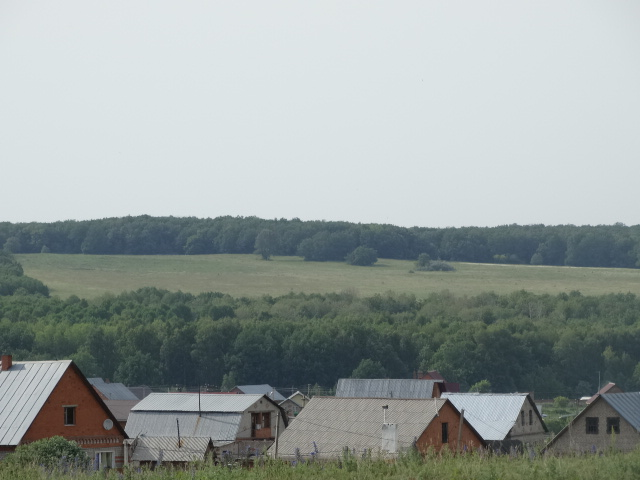

Novogeorgiyevka (Russian: Новогеоргиевка) is a rural locality (a village) in Urman-Bishkadaksky Selsoviet, Ishimbaysky District, Bashkortostan, Russia. The population was 116 as of 2010. There are 7 streets.

== Geography ==
Novogeorgiyevka is located 10 km northeast of Ishimbay (the district's administrative centre) by road. Bogdanovka is the nearest rural locality.
