= Torgaska =

Torgaska Торгаска
- Khutor
- Location within Bashkortostan Location within Russia
- Coordinates: 53°17′N 56°10′E
- Country: Russia
- Region: Bashkortostan
- District: Ishimbaysky District
- Time zone: UTC+5:00

Torgaska (Russian: Торгаска; Bashkir: Торғаҫ, Torğaś) is a rural locality (a khutor) in Skvorchikhinsky Selsoviet, Ishimbaysky District, Bashkortostan, Russia. The population was 8 as of 2010. There are 2 streets.

== Geography ==
Torgaska is located 23 km southeast of Ishimbay (the district's administrative centre) by road. Lesnoye is the nearest rural locality.
