= Arlarovo =

Arlarovo Арларово
- Village
- Location within Bashkortostan Location within Russia
- Coordinates: 53°27′N 56°25′E
- Country: Russia
- Region: Bashkortostan
- District: Ishimbaysky District
- Time zone: UTC+5:00

Arlarovo (Russian: Арларово; Bashkir: Арлар, Arlar) is a rural locality (a village) in Sayranovsky Selsoviet, Ishimbaysky District, Bashkortostan, Russia. The population was 210 as of 2010. There are 3 streets.

== Geography ==
Arlarovo is located 35 km east of Ishimbay (the district's administrative centre) by road. Sayranovo is the nearest rural locality.
