= Kuzyanovo =

Kuzyanovo Кузяново
- Selo
- Location within Bashkortostan Location within Russia
- Coordinates: 53°33′N 56°28′E
- Country: Russia
- Region: Bashkortostan
- District: Ishimbaysky District
- Time zone: UTC+5:00

Kuzyanovo (Russian: Кузя́ново; Bashkir: Көҙән, Köźän) is a rural locality (a selo) and the administrative centre of Kuzyanovsky Selsoviet, Ishimbaysky District, Bashkortostan, Russia. The population was 847 as of 2010. There are 10 streets.

== Geography ==
Kuzyanovo is located 43 km northeast of Ishimbay (the district's administrative centre) by road. Pavlovka is the nearest rural locality.
