= Kabyasovo =

Kabyasovo Кабясово
- Village
- Location within Bashkortostan Location within Russia
- Coordinates: 53°27′N 56°53′E
- Country: Russia
- Region: Bashkortostan
- District: Ishimbaysky District
- Time zone: UTC+5:00

Kabyasovo (Russian: Кабясово; Bashkir: Кәбәс, Käbäs) is a rural locality (a village) in Kulguninsky Selsoviet, Ishimbaysky District, Bashkortostan, Russia. The population was 38 as of 2010. There is 1 street.

== Geography ==
Kabyasovo is located 97 km east of Ishimbay (the district's administrative centre) by road. Yaltaran is the nearest rural locality.
