= Yaltaran =

Yaltaran Ялтаран
- Village
- Location within Bashkortostan Location within Russia
- Coordinates: 53°26′N 56°54′E
- Country: Russia
- Region: Bashkortostan
- District: Ishimbaysky District
- Time zone: UTC+5:00

Yaltaran (Russian: Ялтаран; Bashkir: Ялтыран, Yaltıran) is a rural locality (a village) in Kulguninsky Selsoviet, Ishimbaysky District, Bashkortostan, Russia. The population was 23 as of 2010. There is 1 street.

== Geography ==
Yaltaran is located 98 km east of Ishimbay (the district's administrative centre) by road. Kabyasovo is the nearest rural locality.
