= Urazbayevo =

Urazbayevo Уразбаево
- Village
- Location within Bashkortostan Location within Russia
- Coordinates: 53°19′N 56°20′E
- Country: Russia
- Region: Bashkortostan
- District: Ishimbaysky District
- Time zone: UTC+5:00

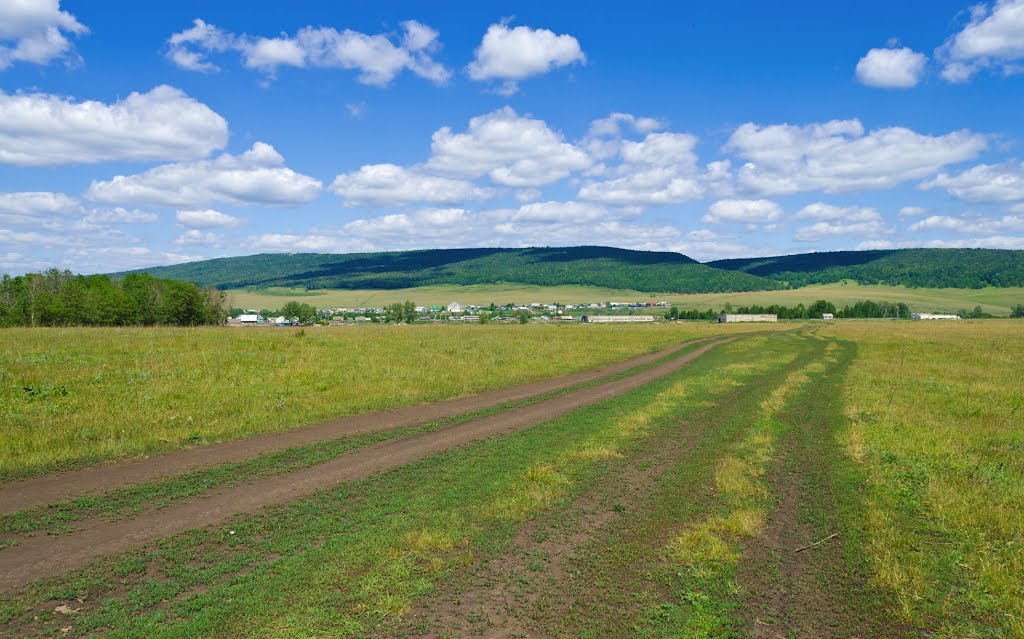
A road from the village to a pond

Urazbayevo (Russian: Уразбаево; Bashkir: Ураҙбай, Uraźbay) is a rural locality (a village) in Itkulovsky Selsoviet, Ishimbaysky District, Bashkortostan, Russia. The population was 638 as of 2010. There are 7 streets.

== Geography ==
Urazbayevo is located 31 km southeast of Ishimbay (the district's administrative centre) by road. Verkhneitkulovo is the nearest rural locality.
