= Verkhotor =

Verkhotor Верхотор
- Selo
- Location within Bashkortostan Location within Russia
- Coordinates: 53°11′N 56°16′E
- Country: Russia
- Region: Bashkortostan
- District: Ishimbaysky District
- Time zone: UTC+5:00

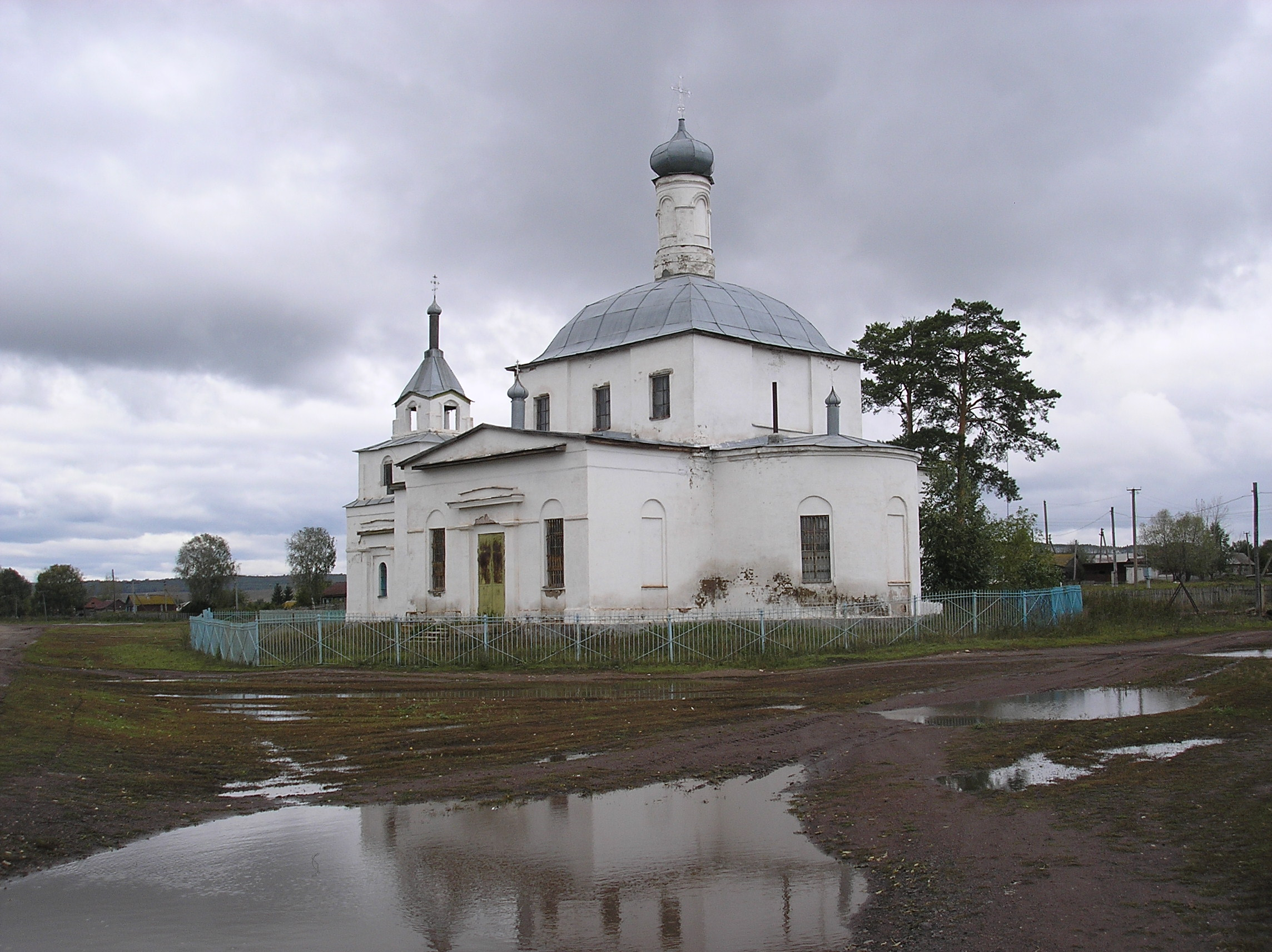
Church of the Kazan Mother of God in the village of Verkhotor.

Verkhotor (Russian: Верхото́р) is a rural locality (a selo) and the administrative centre of Verkhotorsky Selsoviet, Ishimbaysky District, Bashkortostan, Russia. The population was 818 as of 2010. There are 29 streets.

== Geography ==
Verkhotor is located 41 km southeast of Ishimbay (the district's administrative centre) by road. Kuznetsovsky is the nearest rural locality.

== Geology ==
Outcrops of the Permian period (Ufimian, Kazanian and Urzhumian regional stages) are discovered on a right bank of the river Tor, near Verkhotor.
