= Yangi-Yurt =

Yangi-Yurt Янги-Юрт
- Khutor
- Location within Bashkortostan Location within Russia
- Coordinates: 53°43′N 56°22′E
- Country: Russia
- Region: Bashkortostan
- District: Ishimbaysky District
- Time zone: UTC+5:00

Yangi-Yurt (Russian: Янги-Юрт; Bashkir: Яңы Йорт, Yañı Yort) is a rural locality (a khutor) in Yanurusovsky Selsoviet, Ishimbaysky District, Bashkortostan, Russia. The population was 55 as of 2010. There are 2 streets.

== Geography ==
Yangi-Yurt is located 56 km northeast of Ishimbay (the district's administrative centre) by road. Tugayevo is the nearest rural locality.
