= Berdyshla =

Berdyshla Бердышла
- Village
- Location within Bashkortostan Location within Russia
- Coordinates: 53°34′N 56°21′E
- Country: Russia
- Region: Bashkortostan
- District: Ishimbaysky District
- Time zone: UTC+5:00

Berdyshla (Russian: Бердышла; Bashkir: Бәрҙешле, Bärźeşle) is a rural locality (a village) in Petrovsky Selsoviet, Ishimbaysky District, Bashkortostan, Russia. The population was 212 as of 2010. There are 2 streets.

== Geography ==
Berdyshla is located 30 km northeast of Ishimbay (the district's administrative centre) by road. Pavlovka is the nearest rural locality.
