= Khazinovo =

Khazinovo Хазиново
- Village
- Location within Bashkortostan Location within Russia
- Coordinates: 53°24′N 56°22′E
- Country: Russia
- Region: Bashkortostan
- District: Ishimbaysky District
- Time zone: UTC+5:00

Khazinovo (Russian: Хазиново; Bashkir: Хажы, Xajı) is a rural locality (a village) in Sayranovsky Selsoviet, Ishimbaysky District, Bashkortostan, Russia. The population was 62 as of 2010. There is 1 street.

== Geography ==
Khazinovo is located 31 km southeast of Ishimbay (the district's administrative centre) by road. Aznayevo is the nearest rural locality.
