= Kyzyl-Yulduz, Ishimbaysky District, Republic of Bashkortostan =

Kyzyl-Yulduz Кызыл-Юлдуз
- Village
- Location within Bashkortostan Location within Russia
- Coordinates: 53°22′N 56°12′E
- Country: Russia
- Region: Bashkortostan
- District: Ishimbaysky District
- Time zone: UTC+5:00

Kyzyl-Yulduz (Russian: Кызыл-Юлдуз; Bashkir: Ҡыҙыл Йондоҙ, Qıźıl Yondoź) is a rural locality (a village) in Bayguzinsky Selsoviet, Ishimbaysky District, Bashkortostan, Russia. The population was 22 as of 2010. There are 2 streets.

== Geography ==
Kyzyl-Yulduz is located 19 km southeast of Ishimbay (the district's administrative centre) by road. Bolshebaikovo is the nearest rural locality.
