= Kulgunino =

Kulgunino Кулгунино
- Selo
- Location within Bashkortostan Location within Russia
- Coordinates: 53°35′N 56°55′E
- Country: Russia
- Region: Bashkortostan
- District: Ishimbaysky District
- Time zone: UTC+5:00

Kulgunino (Russian: Кулгунино; Bashkir: Ҡолғона, Qolğona) is a rural locality (a selo) and the administrative centre of Kulguninsky Selsoviet, Ishimbaysky District, Bashkortostan, Russia. The population was 774 as of 2010. There are 14 streets.

== Geography ==
Kulgunino is located 81 km east of Ishimbay (the district's administrative centre) by road. Kalu-Ayry is the nearest rural locality.
