= Aznayevo, Ishimbaysky District, Republic of Bashkortostan =

Aznayevo Азнаево
- Village
- Location within Bashkortostan Location within Russia
- Coordinates: 53°24′N 56°21′E
- Country: Russia
- Region: Bashkortostan
- District: Ishimbaysky District
- Time zone: UTC+5:00

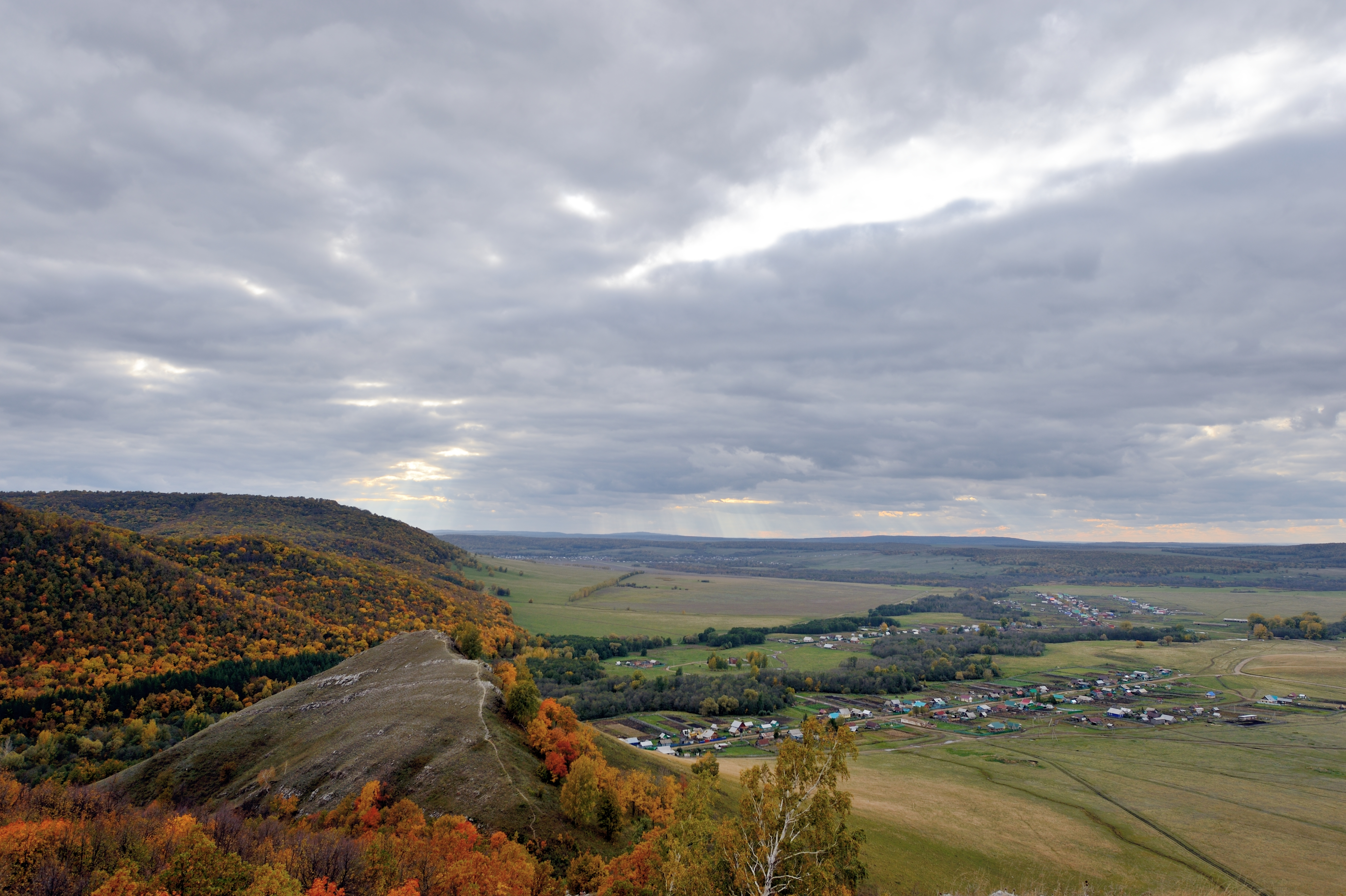
Aznaevo village, Ishimbay district

Aznayevo (Russian: Азнаево; Bashkir: Аҙнай, Aźnay) is a rural locality (a village) in Itkulovsky Selsoviet, Ishimbaysky District, Bashkortostan, Russia. The population was 278 as of 2010. There are 4 streets.

== Geography ==
Aznayevo is located 29 km southeast of Ishimbay (the district's administrative centre) by road. Khazinovo is the nearest rural locality.
