= Nizhnearmetovo =

Nizhnearmetovo Нижнеарметово
- Selo
- Location within Bashkortostan Location within Russia
- Coordinates: 53°39′N 56°29′E
- Country: Russia
- Region: Bashkortostan
- District: Ishimbaysky District
- Time zone: UTC+5:00

Nizhnearmetovo (Russian: Нижнеарметово; Bashkir: Түбәнге Әрмет, Tübänge Ärmet) is a rural locality (a selo) and the administrative centre of Armetovsky Selsoviet, Ishimbaysky District, Bashkortostan, Russia. The population was 590 as of 2010. There are six streets.

== Geography ==
Nizhnearmetovo is located 45 km northeast of Ishimbay (the district's administrative centre) by road. Verkhnearmetovo is the nearest rural locality.
