= Urman-Bishkadak =

Urman-Bishkadak Урман-Бишкадак
- Selo
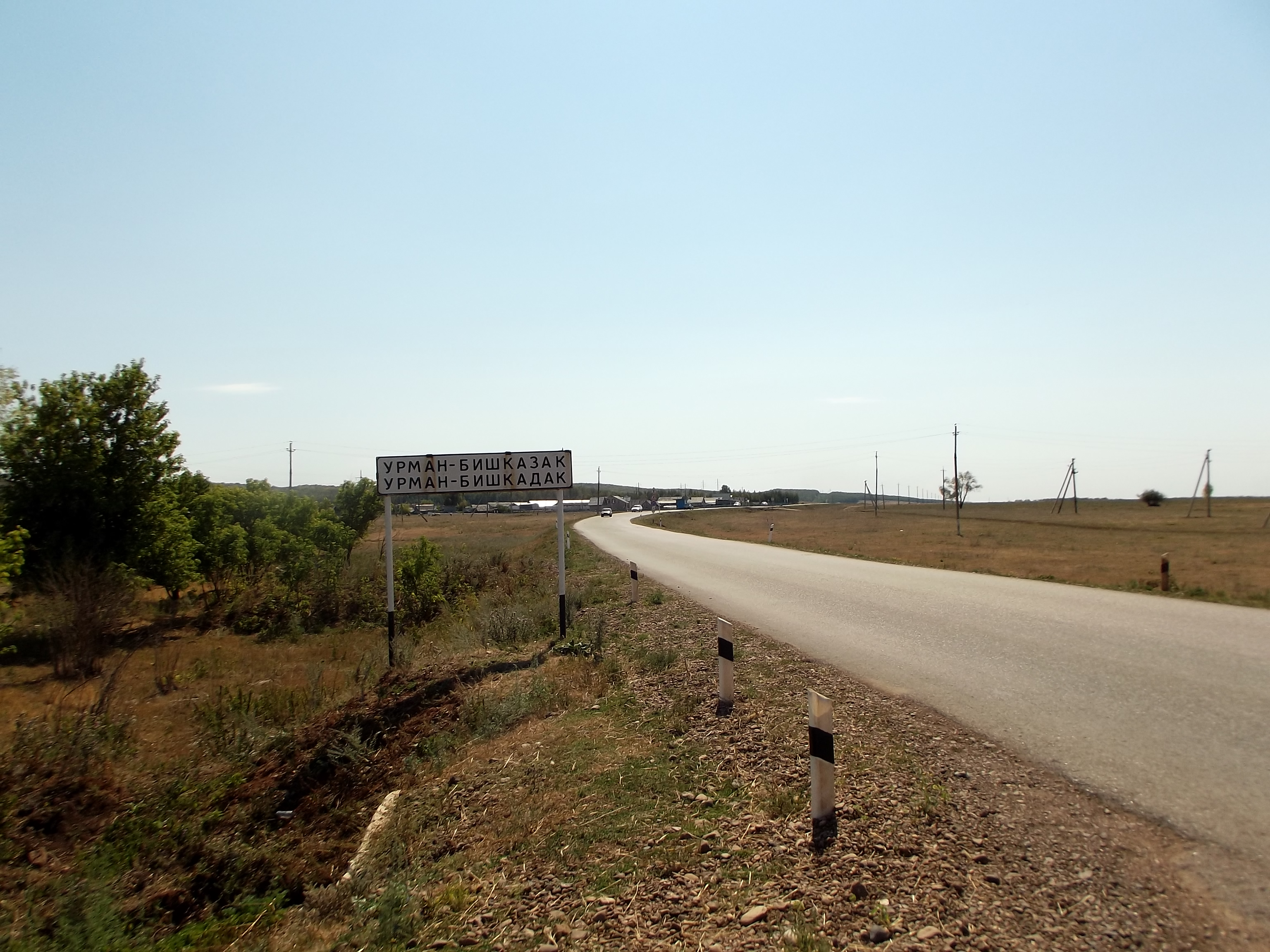
- Road leading to Urman-Bishkadak

- Location within Bashkortostan Location within Russia
- Coordinates: 53°31′N 56°04′E
- Country: Russia
- Region: Bashkortostan
- District: Ishimbaysky District
- Time zone: UTC+5:00

Urman-Bishkadak (Russian: Урман-Бишкадак; Bashkir: Урман-Бишҡаҙаҡ, Urman-Bişqaźaq) is a rural locality (a selo) and the administrative centre of Urman-Bishkadaksky Selsoviet, Ishimbaysky District, Bashkortostan, Russia. The population was 613 in 2010. There are seven streets. It is eleven kilometres north of Ishimbay (the district's administrative centre) by road. Yar-Bishkadak is the nearest rural locality.
