= Novoaptikovo =

Novoaptikovo Новоаптиково
- Selo
- Location within Bashkortostan Location within Russia
- Coordinates: 53°28′N 56°17′E
- Country: Russia
- Region: Bashkortostan
- District: Ishimbaysky District
- Time zone: UTC+5:00

Novoaptikovo (Russian: Новоаптиково; Bashkir: Яңы Әптек, Yañı Äptek) is a rural locality (a selo) and the administrative centre of Sayranovsky Selsoviet, Ishimbaysky District, Bashkortostan, Russia. The population was 1,421 as of 2010. There are 25 streets.

== Geography ==
Novoaptikovo is located 26 km east of Ishimbay (the district's administrative centre) by road. Aptikovo is the nearest rural locality.
