= Shikhan =

Shikhan Шихан
- Village
- Location within Bashkortostan Location within Russia
- Coordinates: 53°33′N 56°05′E
- Country: Russia
- Region: Bashkortostan
- District: Ishimbaysky District
- Time zone: UTC+5:00

Shikhan (Russian: Шихан; Bashkir: Шихан, Şixan) is a rural locality (a village) in Urman-Bishkadaksky Selsoviet, Ishimbaysky District, Bashkortostan, Russia. The population was 11 as of 2010. There are 3 streets.

== Geography ==
Shikhan is located 16 km north of Ishimbay (the district's administrative centre) by road. Karayganovo is the nearest rural locality.
