= Sargayevo =

Sargayevo Саргаево
- Village
- Location within Bashkortostan Location within Russia
- Coordinates: 53°41′N 56°37′E
- Country: Russia
- Region: Bashkortostan
- District: Ishimbaysky District
- Time zone: UTC+5:00

Sargayevo (Russian: Саргаево; Bashkir: Һарғай, Harğay) is a rural locality (a village) in Makarovsky Selsoviet, Ishimbaysky District, Bashkortostan, Russia. The population was 64 in 2010. There is one street.

== Geography ==
Sargayevo is located 55 kilometres (34 mi) northeast of Ishimbay (the district's administrative centre) by road. Isyakayevo is the nearest rural locality.
