= Alakayevo =

Alakayevo Алакаево
- Village
- Location within Bashkortostan Location within Russia
- Coordinates: 53°20′N 56°00′E
- Country: Russia
- Region: Bashkortostan
- District: Ishimbaysky District
- Time zone: UTC+5:00

Alakayevo (Russian: Алакаево; Bashkir: Алаҡай, Alaqay) is a rural locality (a village) in Skvorchikhinsky Selsoviet, Ishimbaysky District, Bashkortostan, Russia. The population was 119 as of 2010. There are 3 streets.

== Geography ==
Alakayevo is located 16 km south of Ishimbay (the district's administrative centre) by road. Yuldashevo is the nearest rural locality.
