= Karayganovo =

Karayganovo Карайганово
- Village
- Location within Bashkortostan Location within Russia
- Coordinates: 53°35′N 56°02′E
- Country: Russia
- Region: Bashkortostan
- District: Ishimbaysky District
- Time zone: UTC+5:00

Karayganovo (Russian: Карайганово; Bashkir: Ҡарайған, Qarayğan) is a rural locality (a village) in Urman-Bishkadaksky Selsoviet, Ishimbaysky District, Bashkortostan, Russia. The population was 277 as of 2010. There are 5 streets.

== Geography ==
Karayganovo is located 18 km north of Ishimbay (the district's administrative centre) by road. Yangi-Aul is the nearest rural locality.
