= Kanakayevo =

Kanakayevo Канакаево
- Village
- Location within Bashkortostan Location within Russia
- Coordinates: 53°33′N 56°11′E
- Country: Russia
- Region: Bashkortostan
- District: Ishimbaysky District
- Time zone: UTC+5:00

Kanakayevo (Russian: Канакаево; Bashkir: Ҡанаҡай, Qanaqay) is a rural locality (a village) in Isheyevsky Selsoviet, Ishimbaysky District, Bashkortostan, Russia. The population was 776 as of 2010. There are 8 streets.

== Geography ==
Kanakayevo is located 20 km northeast of Ishimbay (the district's administrative centre) by road. Akhmerovo is the nearest rural locality.
