= Verkhneitkulovo =

Verkhneitkulovo Верхнеиткулово
- Selo
- Location within Bashkortostan Location within Russia
- Coordinates: 53°22′N 56°19′E
- Country: Russia
- Region: Bashkortostan
- District: Ishimbaysky District
- Time zone: UTC+5:00

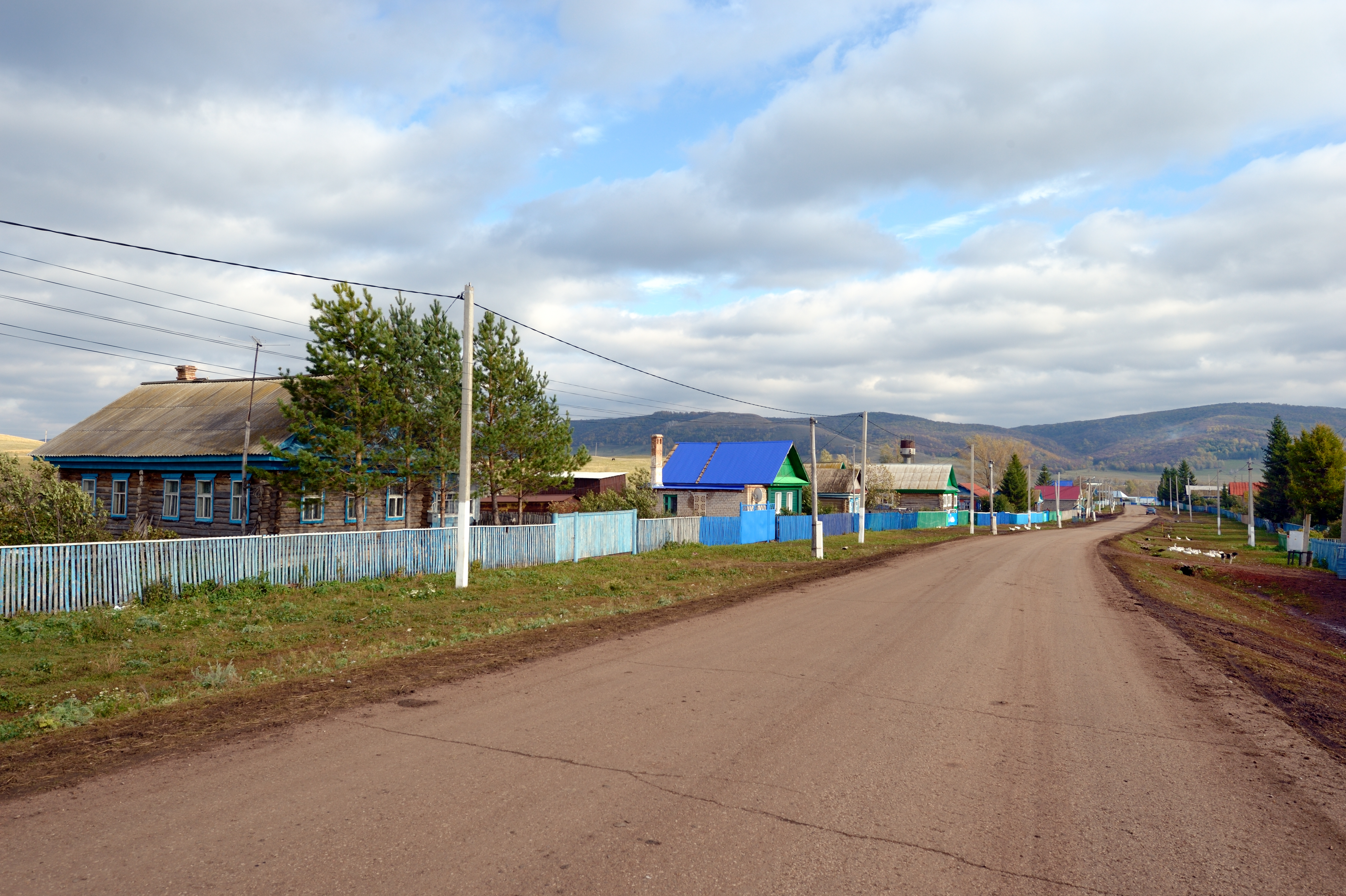

Verkhneitkulovo (Russian: Верхнеиткулово; Bashkir: Үрге Этҡол, Ürge Etqol) is a rural locality (a selo) and the administrative centre of Itkulovsky Selsoviet, Ishimbaysky District, Bashkortostan, Russia. The population was 888 as of 2010. There are 12 streets.

== Geography ==
Verkhneitkulovo is located 25 km southeast of Ishimbay (the district's administrative centre) by road. Urazbayevo is the nearest rural locality.
