= Almaly, Republic of Bashkortostan =

Almaly Алмалы
- Village
- Location within Bashkortostan Location within Russia
- Coordinates: 53°36′N 56°30′E
- Country: Russia
- Region: Bashkortostan
- District: Ishimbaysky District
- Time zone: UTC+5:00

Almaly (Russian: Алмалы; Bashkir: Алмалы, Almalı) is a rural locality (a village) in Petrovsky Selsoviet, Ishimbaysky District, Bashkortostan, Russia. The population was 73 as of 2010. There is 1 street.

== Geography ==
Almaly is located 45 km northeast of Ishimbay (the district's administrative centre) by road. Vasilyevka is the nearest rural locality.
