= Urnyak, Ishimbaysky District, Republic of Bashkortostan =

Urnyak Урняк
- Village
- Location within Bashkortostan Location within Russia
- Coordinates: 53°40′N 56°05′E
- Country: Russia
- Region: Bashkortostan
- District: Ishimbaysky District
- Time zone: UTC+5:00

Urnyak (Russian: Урняк; Bashkir: Үрнәк, Ürnäk) is a rural locality (a village) in Isheyevsky Selsoviet, Ishimbaysky District, Bashkortostan, Russia. The population was 119 as of 2010. There are 14 streets.

== Geography ==
Urnyak is located 31 km north of Ishimbay (the district's administrative centre) by road. Shikhany is the nearest rural locality.
