= Podlesny =

Podlesny Подлесный
- Khutor
- Location within Bashkortostan Location within Russia
- Coordinates: 53°17′N 56°15′E
- Country: Russia
- Region: Bashkortostan
- District: Ishimbaysky District
- Time zone: UTC+5:00

Podlesny (Russian: Подлесный) is a rural locality (a khutor) in Itkulovsky Selsoviet, Ishimbaysky District, Bashkortostan, Russia. The population was 10 as of 2010. There is 1 street.

== Geography ==
Podlesny is located 31 km southeast of Ishimbay (the district's administrative centre) by road. Avangard is the nearest rural locality.
