= Kalmakovo, Ishimbaysky District, Republic of Bashkortostan =

Kalmakovo Калмаково
- Village
- Location within Bashkortostan Location within Russia
- Coordinates: 53°38′23″N 56°28′35″E
- Country: Russia
- Region: Bashkortostan
- District: Ishimbaysky District
- Time zone: UTC+5:00

Kalmakovo (Russian: Калмаково; Bashkir: Ҡалмаҡ, Qalmaq) is a rural locality (a village) in Petrovsky Selsoviet, Ishimbaysky District, Bashkortostan, Russia. The population was 24 as of 2010. There is one street.

== Geography ==
Kalmakovo is located 42 km (26 mi) northeast of Ishimbay (the district's administrative centre) by road. Vasilyevka is the nearest rural locality.
