= Salikhovo, Ishimbaysky District, Republic of Bashkortostan =

Salikhovo Салихово
- Selo
- Location within Bashkortostan Location within Russia
- Coordinates: 53°30′N 56°13′E
- Country: Russia
- Region: Bashkortostan
- District: Ishimbaysky District
- Time zone: UTC+5:00

Salikhovo (Russian: Салихово; Bashkir: Сәлих, Sälix) is a rural locality (a selo) in Urman-Bishkadaksky Selsoviet, Ishimbaysky District, Bashkortostan, Russia. The population was 584 as of 2010. There are 14 streets.

== Geography ==
Salikhovo is located 17 km northeast of Ishimbay (the district's administrative centre) by road. Aptikovo is the nearest rural locality.
