= Malomaksyutovo =

Malomaksyutovo Маломаксютово
- Village
- Location within Bashkortostan Location within Russia
- Coordinates: 53°25′N 56°18′E
- Country: Russia
- Region: Bashkortostan
- District: Ishimbaysky District
- Time zone: UTC+5:00

Malomaksyutovo (Russian: Маломаксю́тово; Bashkir: Бәләкәй Мәҡсүт, Bäläkäy Mäqsüt) is a rural locality (a village) in Sayranovsky Selsoviet, Ishimbaysky District, Bashkortostan, Russia. The population was 207 as of 2010. There are 5 streets.

== Geography ==
Malomaksyutovo is located 25 km southeast of Ishimbay (the district's administrative centre) by road. Kashalakbash is the nearest rural locality.
