= Iskisyakovo =

Iskisyakovo Искисяково
- Village
- Location within Bashkortostan Location within Russia
- Coordinates: 53°29′N 56°30′E
- Country: Russia
- Region: Bashkortostan
- District: Ishimbaysky District
- Time zone: UTC+5:00

Iskisyakovo (Russian: Искисяково; Bashkir: Иҫкесәк, İśkesäk) is a rural locality (a village) in Kuzyanovsky Selsoviet, Ishimbaysky District, Bashkortostan, Russia. The population was 68 as of 2010. There is 1 street.

== Geography ==
Iskisyakovo is located 51 km east of Ishimbay (the district's administrative centre) by road. Kyzyl Oktyabr is the nearest rural locality.
