= Malobaikovo =

Malobaikovo Малобаиково
- Village
- Location within Bashkortostan Location within Russia
- Coordinates: 53°23′N 56°07′E
- Country: Russia
- Region: Bashkortostan
- District: Ishimbaysky District
- Time zone: UTC+5:00

Malobaikovo (Russian: Малобаиково; Bashkir: Бәләкәй Байыҡ, Bäläkäy Bayıq) is a rural locality (a village) in Bayguzinsky Selsoviet, Ishimbaysky District, Bashkortostan, Russia. The population was 148 as of 2010. There are 3 streets.

== Geography ==
Malobaikovo is located 12 km southeast of Ishimbay (the district's administrative centre) by road. Bayguzino is the nearest rural locality.
