= Timashevka =

Timashevka Тимашевка
- Village
- Location within Bashkortostan Location within Russia
- Coordinates: 53°32′N 56°20′E
- Country: Russia
- Region: Bashkortostan
- District: Ishimbaysky District
- Time zone: UTC+5:00

Timashevka (Russian: Тимашевка) is a rural locality (a village) in Petrovsky Selsoviet, Ishimbaysky District, Bashkortostan, Russia. The population was 385 as of 2010. There are 5 streets.

== Geography ==
Timashevka is located 25 km northeast of Ishimbay (the district's administrative centre) by road. Solyony is the nearest rural locality.
