= Kinzekeyevo =

Kinzekeyevo Кинзекеево
- Selo
- Location within Bashkortostan Location within Russia
- Coordinates: 53°17′N 56°03′E
- Country: Russia
- Region: Bashkortostan
- District: Ishimbaysky District
- Time zone: UTC+5:00

Kinzekeyevo (Russian: Кинзеке́ево; Bashkir: Кинйәкәй, Kinyäkäy) is a rural locality (a selo) in Skvorchikhinsky Selsoviet, Ishimbaysky District, Bashkortostan, Russia. The population was 261 as of 2010. There are 4 streets.

== Geography ==
Kinzekeyevo is located 27 km south of Ishimbay (the district's administrative centre) by road. Skvorchikha is the nearest rural locality.
