= Verkhnearmetovo =

Verkhnearmetovo Верхнеарметово
- Village
- Location within Bashkortostan Location within Russia
- Coordinates: 53°41′N 56°29′E
- Country: Russia
- Region: Bashkortostan
- District: Ishimbaysky District
- Time zone: UTC+5:00

Verkhnearmetovo (Russian: Верхнеарметово; Bashkir: Үрге Әрмет, Ürge Ärmet) is a rural locality (a village) in Armetovsky Selsoviet, Ishimbaysky District, Bashkortostan, Russia. The population was 382 as of 2010. There are 2 streets.

== Geography ==
Verkhnearmetovo is located 57 km northeast of Ishimbay (the district's administrative centre) by road. Nizhnearmetovo is the nearest rural locality.
