= Isyakayevo, Ishimbaysky District, Republic of Bashkortostan =

Isyakayevo Исякаево
- Village
- Location within Bashkortostan Location within Russia
- Coordinates: 53°40′N 56°35′E
- Country: Russia
- Region: Bashkortostan
- District: Ishimbaysky District
- Time zone: UTC+5:00

Isyakayevo (Russian: Исякаево; Bashkir: Иҫәкәй, İśäkäy) is a rural locality (a village) in Makarovsky Selsoviet, Ishimbaysky District, Bashkortostan, Russia. The population was 251 as of 2010. There are 3 streets.

== Geography ==
Isyakayevo is located 53 km northeast of Ishimbay (the district's administrative centre) by road. Ibrayevo is the nearest rural locality.
