= Armetrakhimovo =

Armetrakhimovo Арметрахимово
- Village
- Location within Bashkortostan Location within Russia
- Coordinates: 53°38′N 56°27′E
- Country: Russia
- Region: Bashkortostan
- District: Ishimbaysky District
- Time zone: UTC+5:00

Armetrakhimovo (Russian: Арметрахимово; Bashkir: Әрмет-Рәхим, Ärmet-Räxim) is a rural locality (a village) in Petrovsky Selsoviet, Ishimbaysky District, Bashkortostan, Russia. The population was 315 in 2010. There are seven streets.

== Geography ==
Armetrakhimovo is located 41 km northeast of Ishimbay (the district's administrative centre) by road. Vasilyevka is the nearest rural locality.
