= Starosaitovo =

Starosaitovo Старосаитово
- Village
- Location within Bashkortostan Location within Russia
- Coordinates: 53°40′N 56°58′E
- Country: Russia
- Region: Bashkortostan
- District: Ishimbaysky District
- Time zone: UTC+5:00

Starosaitovo (Russian: Старосаитово; Bashkir: Иҫке Сәйет, İśke Säyet) is a rural locality (a village) in Kulguninsky Selsoviet, Ishimbaysky District, Bashkortostan, Russia. The population was 177 as of 2010. There are 4 streets.

== Geography ==
Starosaitovo is located 94 km northeast of Ishimbay (the district's administrative centre) by road. Kulgunino is the nearest rural locality.
