= Kuznetsovsky =

Kuznetsovsky Кузнецовский
- Khutor
- Location within Bashkortostan Location within Russia
- Coordinates: 53°11′N 56°12′E
- Country: Russia
- Region: Bashkortostan
- District: Ishimbaysky District
- Time zone: UTC+5:00

Kuznetsovsky (Russian: Кузнецовский) is a rural locality (a khutor) in Verkhotorsky Selsoviet, Ishimbaysky District, Bashkortostan, Russia. The population was 98 as of 2010. There are 2 streets.

== Geography ==
Kuznetsovsky is located 36 km southeast of Ishimbay (the district's administrative centre) by road. Romadanovka is the nearest rural locality.
