= Sergey Novikov =

Sergey Novikov may refer to:

- Sergei Novikov (footballer) (born 1961), Soviet Russian footballer
- Sergei Novikov (mathematician) (1938–2024), Russian mathematician
- Sergey Novikov (biathlete) (born 1979), Belarusian biathlete
- Sergey Novikov (cross-country skier) (born 1980), Russian cross-country skier
- Sergey Novikov (photographer), Russian photographer

== See also ==
- Serhiy Novikov (1949–2021), Soviet judoka from Ukraine
- Siarhei Novikau (disambiguation)
