= Kinzebulatovo =

Kinzebulatovo Кинзебулатово
- Village
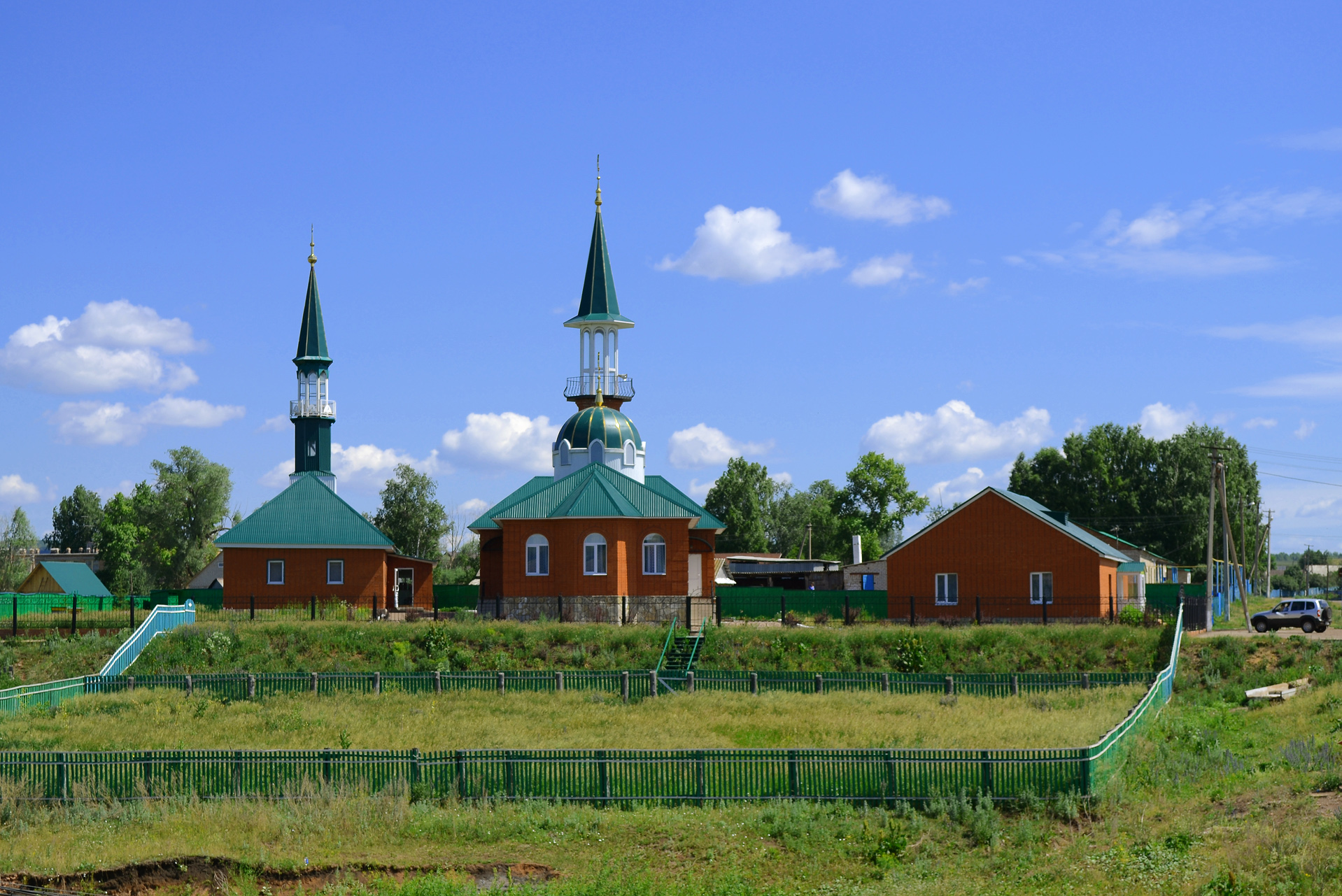

- Location within Bashkortostan Location within Russia
- Coordinates: 53°24′N 56°11′E
- Country: Russia
- Region: Bashkortostan
- District: Ishimbaysky District
- Time zone: UTC+5:00

Kinzebulatovo (Russian: Кинзебулатово; Bashkir: Кинйәбулат, Kinyäbulat) is a rural locality (a village) and the administrative centre of Bayguzinsky Selsoviet, Ishimbaysky District, Bashkortostan, Russia. The population was 1,058 as of 2010. There are 23 streets.

== Geography ==
Kinzebulatovo is located 15 km southeast of Ishimbay (the district's administrative centre) by road. Bayguzino is the nearest rural locality.
