= Safartuy =

Former human settlement in Republic of Bashkortostan, Russia

Coordinates: 53°46′49″N 56°46′49″E

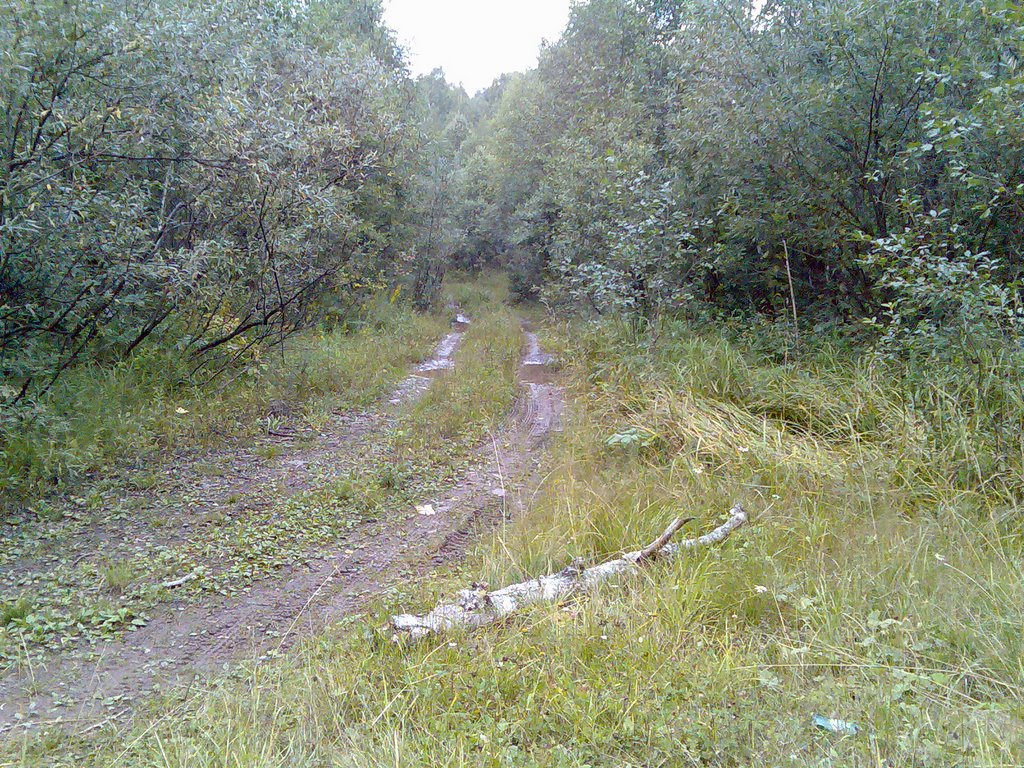
A road in Safartuy

Safartuy (Russian: Сафартуй) was a rural locality (a khutor) in Ishimbaysky District of the Bashkir ASSR in the Russian SFSR, Soviet Union, located in the upper reaches of the Bolshoy Ryauzak River. It was abolished on December 11, 1987.
