= Yar-Bishkadak =

Yar-Bishkadak Яр-Бишкадак
- Village
- Location within Bashkortostan Location within Russia
- Coordinates: 53°29′N 56°02′E
- Country: Russia
- Region: Bashkortostan
- District: Ishimbaysky District
- Time zone: UTC+5:00

Yar-Bishkadak (Russian: Яр-Бишкадак; Bashkir: Яр-Бишҡаҙаҡ, Yar-Bişqaźaq) is a rural locality (a village) in Urman-Bishkadaksky Selsoviet, Ishimbaysky District, Bashkortostan, Russia. The population was 539 as of 2010. There are 5 streets in this locality.

== Geography ==
Yar-Bishkadak is located 6 km north of Ishimbay (the district's administrative centre) by road. Ishimbay is the nearest rural locality.
