= Siarhei Novikau =

Siarhei Novikau may refer to:

- Siarhei Novikau (boxer) (born 1989), Belarusian boxer
- Siarhei Novikau (judoka) (born 1982), Belarusian judoka

== See also ==
- Sergey Novikov (disambiguation)
