= Urman-Asty =

Urman-Asty Урман-Асты
- Village
- Location within Bashkortostan Location within Russia
- Coordinates: 55°15′N 54°55′E
- Country: Russia
- Region: Bashkortostan
- District: Dyurtyulinsky District
- Time zone: UTC+5:00

Urman-Asty (Russian: Урман-Асты; Bashkir: Урманаҫты, Urmanaśtı) is a rural locality (a village) in Kukkuyanovsky Selsoviet, Dyurtyulinsky District, Bashkortostan, Russia. The population was 279 as of 2010. There are 6 streets.

== Geography ==
Urman-Asty is located 34 km south of Dyurtyuli (the district's administrative centre) by road. Ivachevo is the nearest rural locality.
