= Sergey Novikov (photographer) =

Soviet-Russian photographer

Sergey Georgiyevich Novikov (born 1954, Ishimbay, Bashkiria) is a Soviet-Russian photographer with primary focus on portraits of academic subjects. Between 1970–80s he did mostly landscapes and Nude art, and was interested in photomontage and collaging.

== Biography ==
He graduated from Chelyabinsk State Pedagogical University with degree in Physics and studied under photographer Yuri Teusha.

To commemorate his 70th birthday in 2024, St. Petersburg publisher «Ludovik» printed a two-volume book containing selection of curated works by Novikov. The first one is titled Новиков. Явление мастера, showcasing the work he has done before he became known for his portraits, while the second, Новиков. Явление лица, is a brief tour of his works created within the last 40 years.
