= Ishimbaysky District =

Ishimbaysky District Ишимбайский район (Russian)
- District

Other transcription(s)
  - Bashkir: Ишембай районы
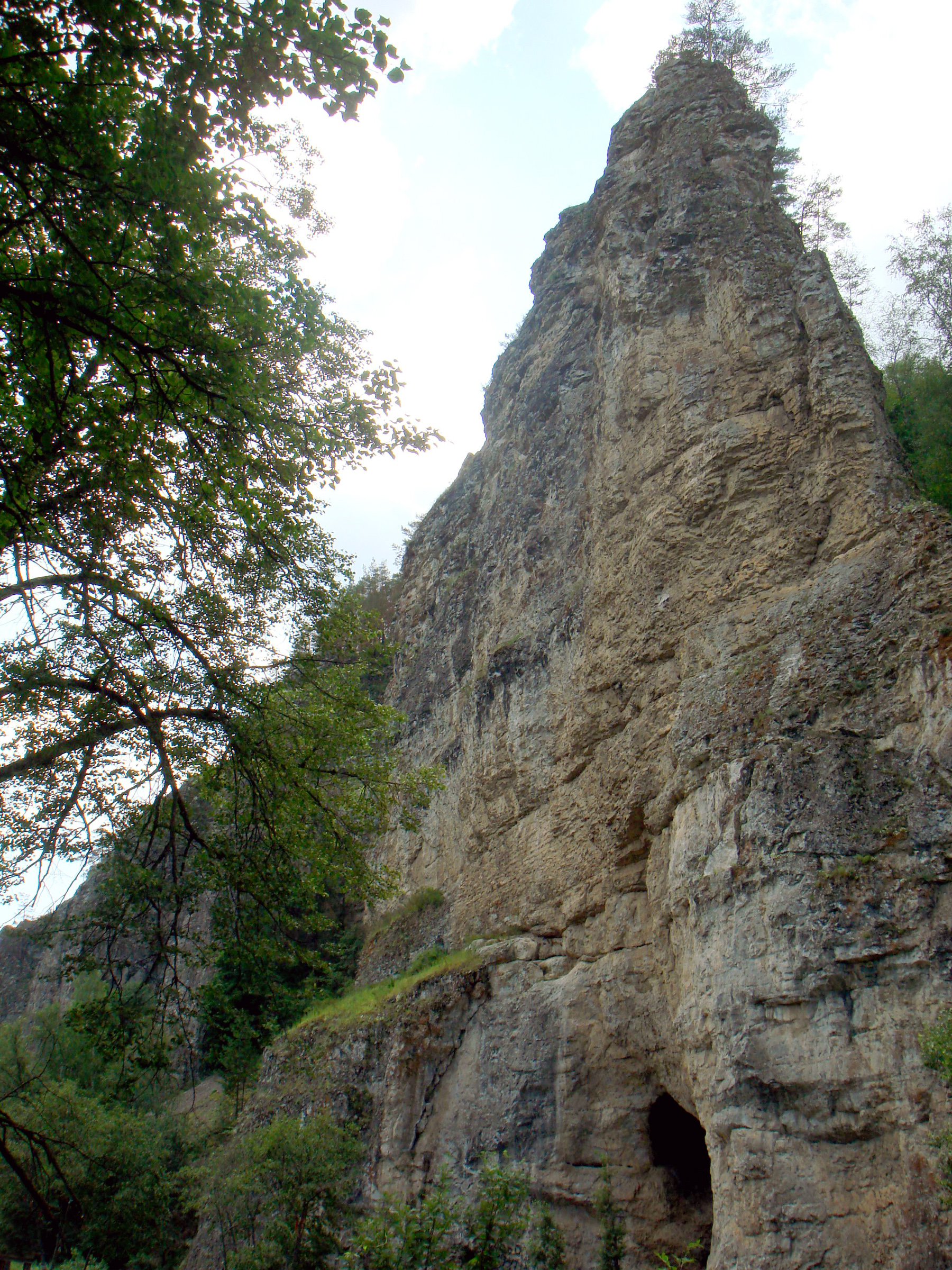
- The Kalim-uskan Rock with the Salavat Yulayev Cave is a natural monument located in Ishimbaysky District

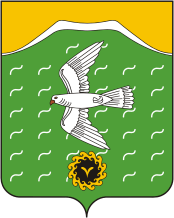
- Flag Coat of arms
- Location of Ishimbaysky District in the Republic of Bashkortostan
- Coordinates: 53.477°N 56.512°E
- Country: Russia
- Federal subject: Republic of Bashkortostan
- Established: March 20, 1937
- Administrative center: Ishimbay

Area
  - Total: 4,006 km^{2} (1,547 sq mi)

Population (2010 Census)
  - Total: 25,042
  - Estimate (2018): 87,282 (+248.5%)
  - Density: 6.251/km^{2} (16.19/sq mi)
  - Urban: 0%
  - Rural: 100%

Administrative structure
  - Administrative divisions: 13 Selsoviets
  - Inhabited localities: 86 rural localities

Municipal structure
  - Municipally incorporated as: Ishimbaysky Municipal District
  - Municipal divisions: 1 urban settlements, 13 rural settlements
- Time zone: UTC+5 (MSK+2)
- OKTMO ID: 80631000
- Website: http://www.ishimbaimr.ru

Population of Ishimbaysky District
- 2010 Census: 25,042
- 2002 Census: 25,610
- 1989 Census: 25,499
- 1979 Census: 33,429

Ishimbaysky District (Russian: Ишимба́йский райо́н; Bashkir: Ишембай районы, romanized: İşembay rayonı) is an administrative and municipal district (raion), one of the fifty-four in the Republic of Bashkortostan, Russia. It is located in the southern central part of the republic and borders with Gafuriysky District in the north, Beloretsky District in the northeast, Burzyansky District in the east and southeast, Meleuzovsky District in the south, and with Sterlitamaksky District in the west. The area of the district is 4,006 square kilometers (1,547 sq mi). Its administrative center is the town of Ishimbay (which is not administratively a part of the district). As of the 2010 Census, the total population of the district was 25,042.

== History ==
The district was established on March 20, 1937.

== Administrative and municipal status ==
Within the framework of administrative divisions, Ishimbaysky District is one of the fifty-four in the Republic of Bashkortostan. It is divided into thirteen selsoviets, comprising eighty-six rural localities. The town of Ishimbay serves as its administrative center, despite being incorporated separately as a town of republic significance—an administrative unit with the status equal to that of the districts.

As a municipal division, the district is incorporated as Ishimbaysky Municipal District, with the town of republic significance of Ishimbay being incorporated within it as Ishimbay Urban Settlement. Its thirteen selsoviets are incorporated as thirteen rural settlements within the municipal district. The town of Ishimbay serves as the administrative center of the municipal district as well.

== Villages and localities ==
- Safartuy
- Yar-Bishkadak

== Gallery ==
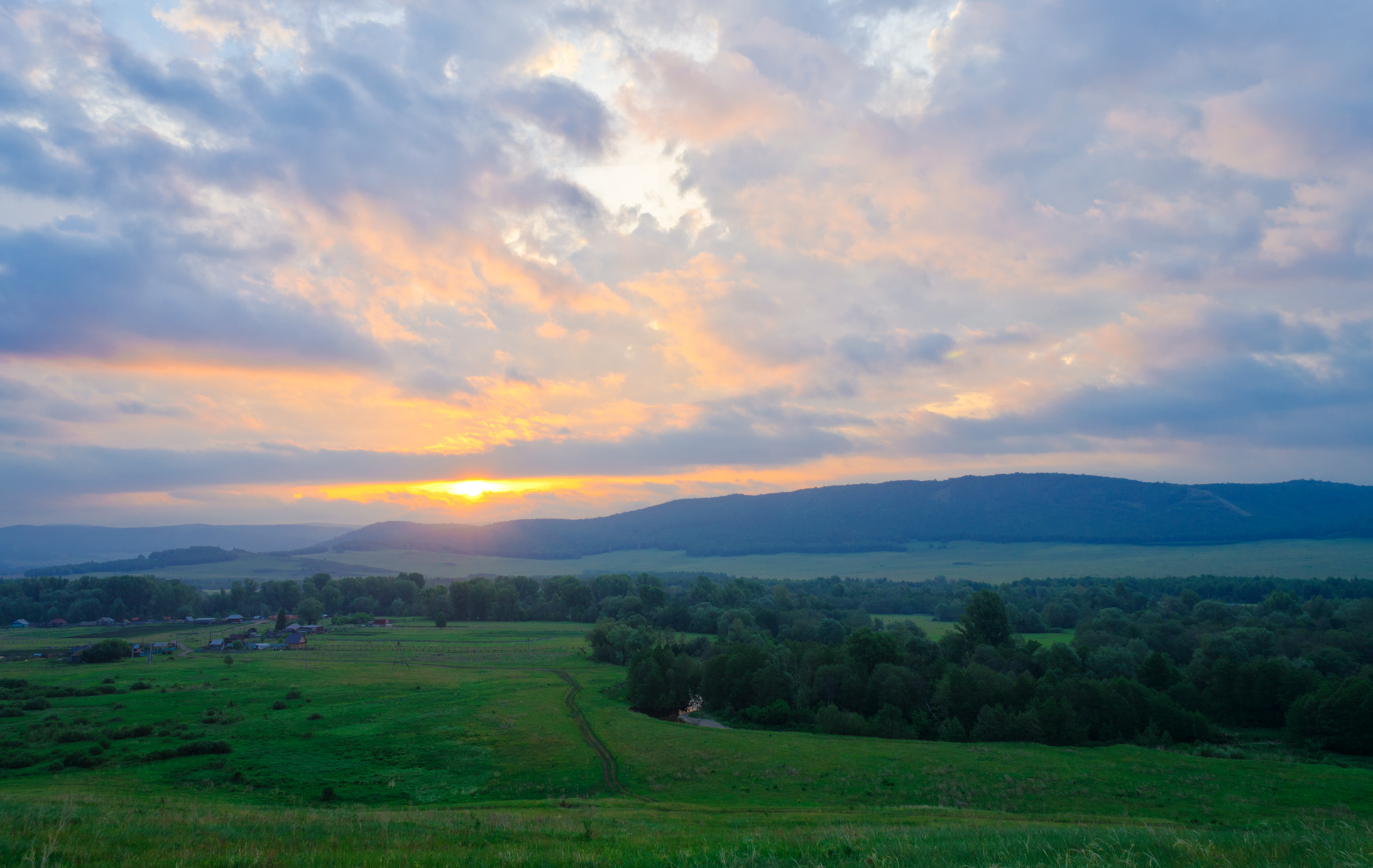
Sunrise on the Zigan River

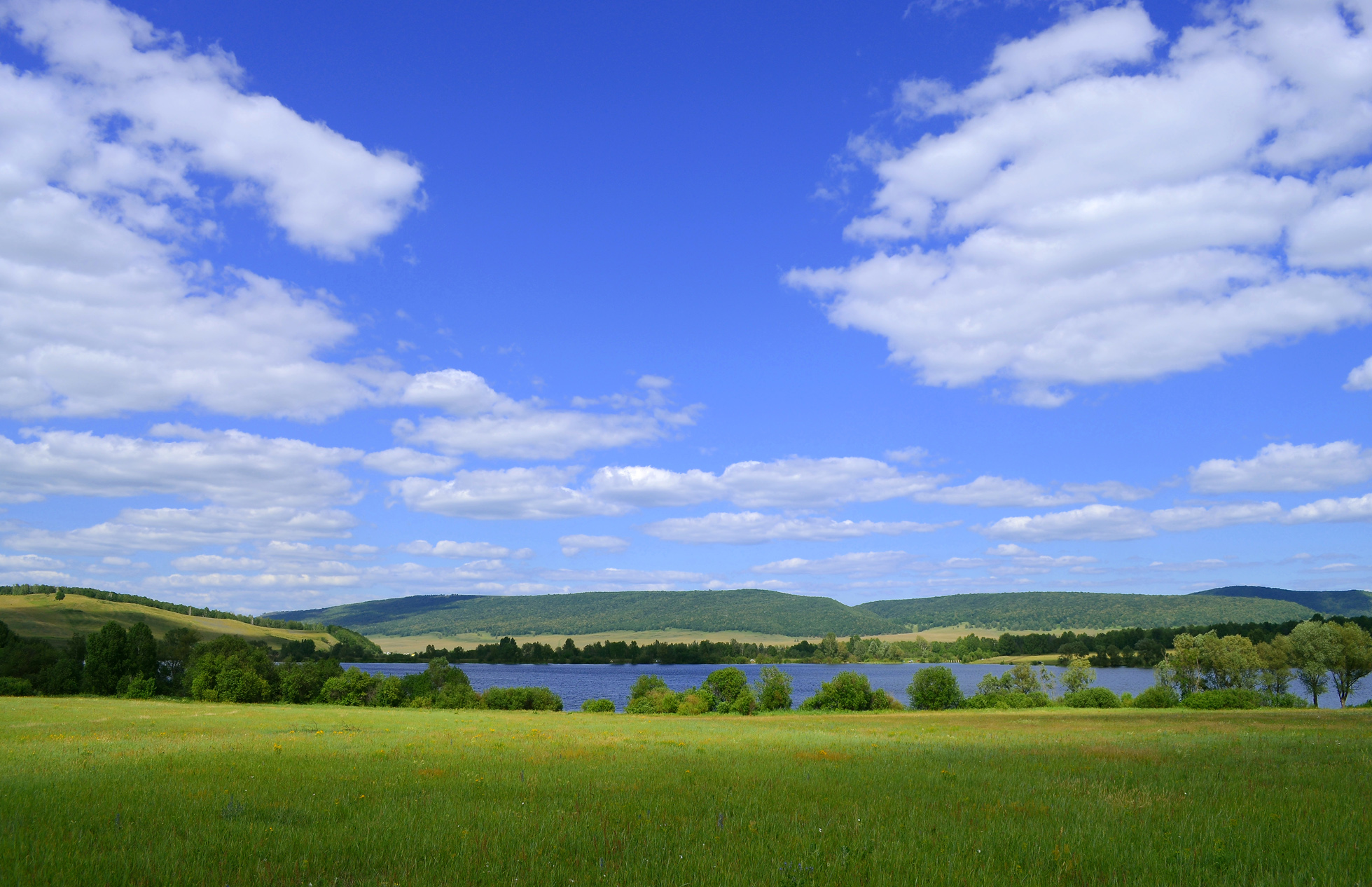
Lake near Urazbayevo village

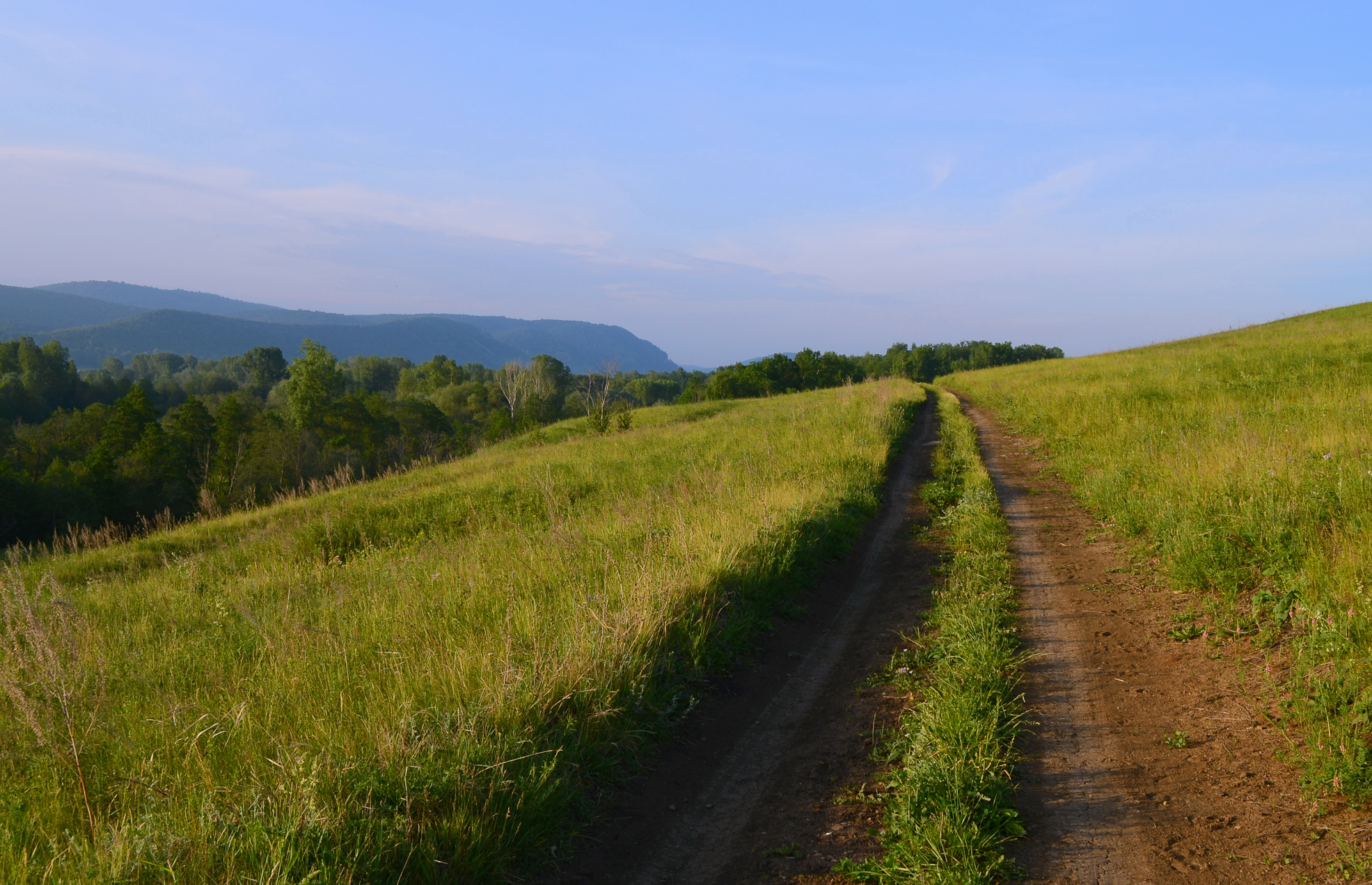
Rural road

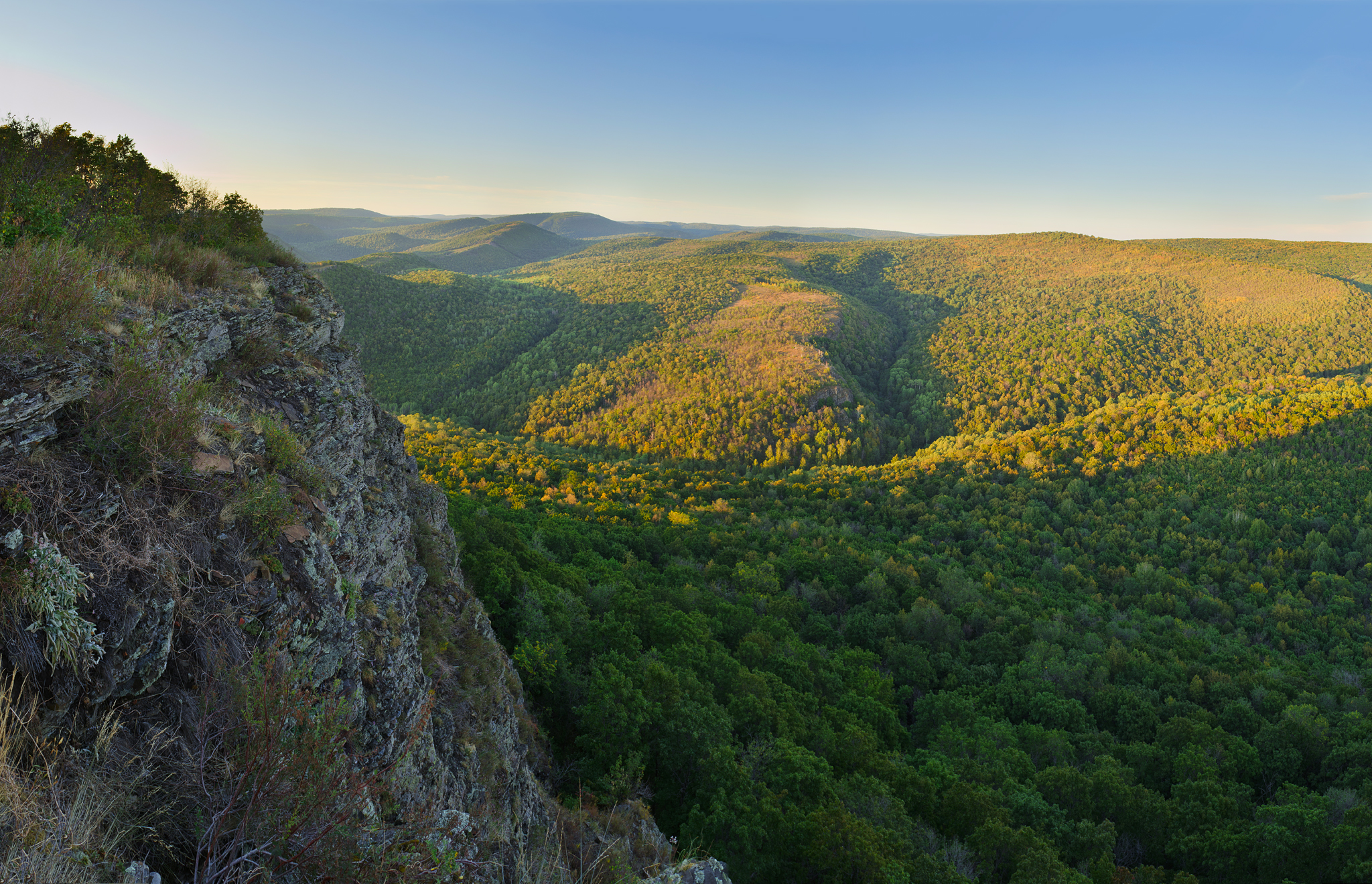
Hauaze rocks
