= Ishimbay =

Town in Bashkortostan, Russia

Ishimbay Ишимбай
- Town

Other transcription(s)
  - Bashkir: Ишембай
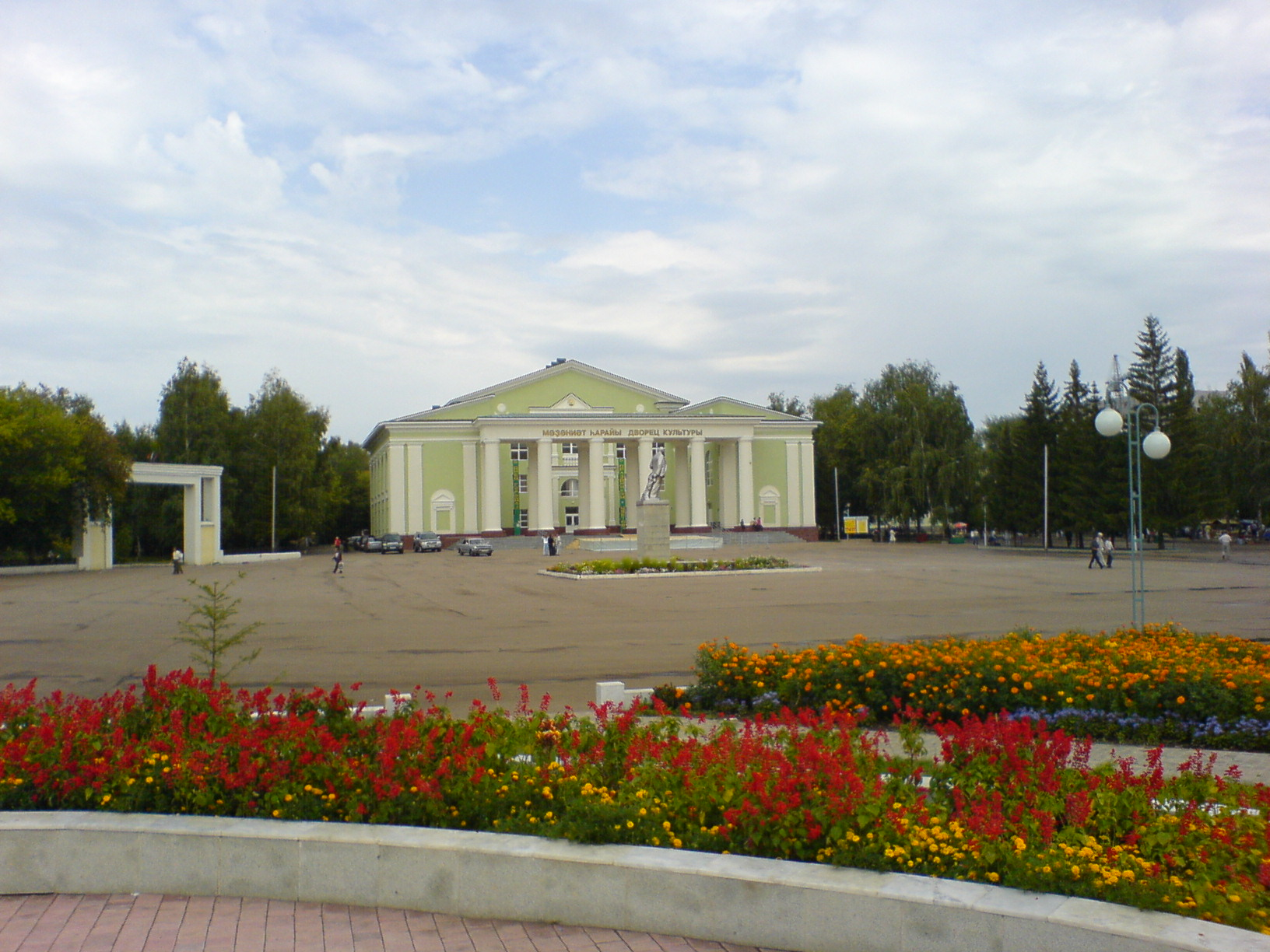

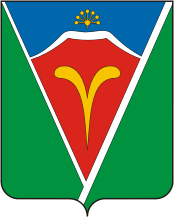
- Flag Coat of arms
- Interactive map of Ishimbay
- Location of Ishimbay Ishimbay (Bashkortostan)
- Coordinates: 53°27′N 56°02′E
- Country: Russia
- Federal subject: Bashkortostan
- Founded: 1815
- Elevation: 150 m (490 ft)

Population (2010 Census)
  - Total: 66,259
  - Estimate (2025): 61,978 (−6.5%)
  - Rank: 235th in 2010

Administrative status
  - Subordinated to: town of republic significance of Ishimbay
  - Capital of: Ishimbaysky District, town of republic significance of Ishimbay

Municipal status
  - Municipal district: Ishimbaysky Municipal District
  - Urban settlement: Ishimbay Urban Settlement
  - Capital of: Ishimbaysky Municipal District, Ishimbay Urban Settlement
- Time zone: UTC+5 (MSK+2)
- Postal code: 453200–453215
- OKTMO ID: 80631101001

Ishimbay (Russian: Ишимба́й; Bashkir: Ишембай, romanized: İşembay) is a town in the Republic of Bashkortostan, Russia, located on the banks of the Belaya and Tayruk Rivers, 166 kilometers (103 mi) south of Ufa. Population: 66,259 (2010 census); 70,195 (2002 census); 69,896 (1989 Soviet census).

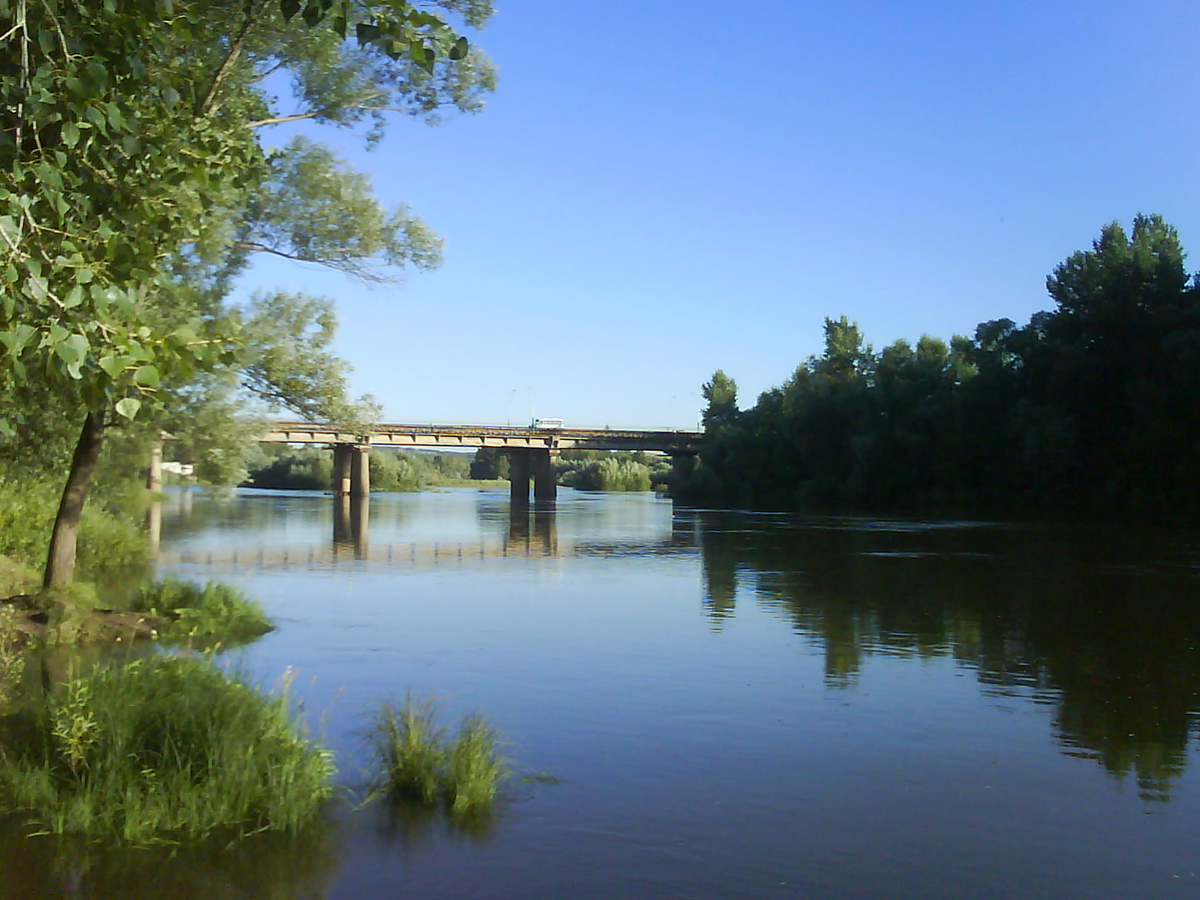
The Belaya River in Ishimbay

== Administrative and municipal status ==
Within the framework of administrative divisions, Ishimbay serves as the administrative center of Ishimbaysky District, even though it is not a part of it. As an administrative division, it is incorporated separately as the town of republic significance of Ishimbay—an administrative unit with the status equal to that of the districts. As a municipal division, the town of republic significance of Ishimbay is incorporated within Ishimbaysky Municipal District as Ishimbay Urban Settlement.

== Geography ==
=== Climate ===
The climate of Ishimbay is continental with the average annual temperature being 3.31 °C (37.96 °F), ranging from −12.3 °C (9.9 °F) in January to 20.3 °C (68.5 °F) in July.

== Demographics ==
Ethnic composition:

- Russians: 51.7% (34 080)
- Bashkirs: 28.4% (18 990)
- Tatars: 14.9% (8976)
- others: 5% (3315)

== Economy ==
Bashneft has one of its offices located in Ishimbay.

Industrial production is represented by factories producing tracked articulated, all-terrain carrier (engineering company "Vityaz"), drilling equipment (Ishimbayskiy Machine Works), remote manipulators (INMAN, belongs Palfinger).

== Notable people ==
- Sergey Novikov, portrait photographer
