= Mikhaylov (surname) =

Mikhaylov or Mikhaylova, also transliterated as Mikhailov or Mihaylov, is a surname that is derived from the male given name Mikhail and literally means Mikhail's.

== Geographical distribution ==
As of 2014, 84.7% of all known bearers of the surname Mikhaylov were residents of Russia (frequency 1:795), 7.0% of Ukraine (1:3,051), 2.2% of Kazakhstan (1:3,694), 2.2% of Belarus (1:2,047) and 2.0% of Uzbekistan (1:7,109).

In Russia, the frequency of the surname was higher than national average (1:795) in the following subjects of the Russian Federation:

1. Chuvashia (1:114)
2. Pskov Oblast (1:146)
3. Novgorod Oblast (1:159)
4. Mari El (1:205)
5. Leningrad Oblast (1:254)
6. Sakha Republic (1:256)
7. Amur Oblast (1:338)
8. Tver Oblast (1:372)
9. Zabaykalsky Krai (1:406)
10. Kostroma Oblast (1:451)
11. Stavropol Krai (1:480)
12. Saint Petersburg (1:512)
13. Smolensk Oblast (1:515)
14. Jewish Autonomous Oblast (1:534)
15. Komi Republic (1:580)
16. Krasnoyarsk Krai (1:637)
17. Murmansk Oblast (1:650)
18. Tomsk Oblast (1:665)
19. Republic of Karelia (1:670)
20. Udmurtia (1:673)
21. Yaroslavl Oblast (1:673)
22. Samara Oblast (1:688)
23. Kemerovo Oblast (1:710)
24. Volgograd Oblast (1:757)
25. Buryatia (1:758)
26. Khakassia (1:788)
27. Irkutsk Oblast (1:789)

== People ==
- Aksinia Mihaylova (born 1963), Bulgarian translator, editor and poet
- Alexey Iosifovich Mikhaylov (1895–1941), Soviet officer
- Aleksei Vladimirovich Mikhaylov (born 1983), Russian footballer
- Alexander Mikhaylov (disambiguation), several people
- Anani Mikhaylov (born 1948), Bulgarian fencer
- Anatoly Mikhaylov (disambiguation), several people
- Andrei Mihailov (born 1980), Moldovan backstroke swimmer
- Antonio Mihaylov (born 1991), Bulgarian footballer
- Atanas Mihaylov (1949–2006), Bulgarian footballer
- Biser Mihaylov (1943–2020), Bulgarian footballer
- Boris Mikhailov (born 1944), Soviet ice hockey player
- Boris Mikhailov (born 1938), Soviet and Ukrainian photographer
- Boris Mikhaylovich Mikhaylov (1908–1984), Soviet chemist
- Borislav Mihaylov (1963–2026), Bulgarian footballer and football official
- Dmitry Mikhaylov (born 1976), Russian football player and coach
- Eduard Mikhaylov (born 1972), Russian football player
- Egor Mikhailov (born 1978), Russian ice hockey player
- Ekaterina Mihaylova (born 1956), Bulgarian politician
- Emil Mihaylov (born 1988), Bulgarian footballer
- Hristo Mihaylov (1893–1944), Bulgarian Communist and military commander
- Felix Mikhailov (1930–2006), Soviet and Russian psychologist
- Gennady Mikhaylov (born 1974), Russian road bicycle racer
- Gorazd Mihajlov (born 1974), Macedonian footballer
- Iskra Mihaylova (born 1957), Bulgarian politician
- Ivan Mihailov (1896–1990), Bulgarian revolutionary
- Ivan Mihailov (born 1944), Bulgarian boxer
- Ivaylo Mihaylov (born 1991), Bulgarian footballer
- Ivo Mihaylov (born 1989), Bulgarian footballer
- Ivomira Mihaylova (born 1990), Bulgarian judoka
- Kalvis Mihailovs (born 1988), Latvian orienteering competitor
- Katya Sambuca (born Yekaterina Mikhailova, 1991), Russian singer, actress, television presenter, and erotic model
- Khristo Mikhailov (1893–1944), Bulgarian politician
- Kiril Mihaylov (born 1986), Bulgarian footballer
- Konstantin Mikhailov (disambiguation), several people
- Larissa Mikhailova (born 1981), Kazakhstani water polo player
- Lev Mikhailov (revolutionary) (1872–1928), Russian revolutionary
- Lev Mikhailov (1936–2003), Soviet and Russian clarinetist and saxophonist
- Lev Mikhaylov (1938–2004), Soviet figure skater
- Lilian Mihaylov (born 1994), Bulgarian badminton player
- Maxim Mikhailov (1893–1971), Russian opera singer
- Maxim Mikhaylov (born 1988), Russian volleyball player
- Mikhail Mikhaylov (disambiguation), several people
- Nadezhda Neynsky (born Nadezhda Mihaylova, 1962), Bulgarian politician
- Natalia Mikhailova (born 1986), Russian competitive ice dancer
- Nikolay Mihaylov (born 1988), Bulgarian racing cyclist
- Nikolay Mihaylov (born 1988), Bulgarian football player
- Nikolay Mikhaylov (1932–2006), Soviet military conductor
- Nikolay Mikhaylov (born 1948), Bulgarian ice hockey player
- Nikolay Nikolayevich Mikhaylov (1905–1982), Soviet writer
- Nina Kulagina (born Ninel Mikhaylova; 1926–1990), Russian woman who claimed to have psychic powers
- Oleg Mikhaylov (disambiguation), several people
- Olga Mikhaylova (born 1986), Russian race walker
- P. Mikhailov, Russian soloist with the Alexandrov Ensemble
- Polina Mikhaylova (born 1986), Russian table tennis player
- Ruslan Mikhaylov (born 1979), Russian footballer
- Sergey Mikhaylov (disambiguation), several people
- Snezhana Mikhaylova (born 1954), Bulgarian basketball player
- Spiridon Mikhaylov (1821–1861), Russian historian, folklorist, and writer
- Serafim Mihaylov (born 1995), Bulgarian footballer
- Stas Mikhaylov (born 1969), Russian singer-songwriter
- Tanja Mihhailova (born 1983), Estonian singer
- Tatsiana Mikhailava (born 1987), Belarusian female speed skater
- Timofey Mikhaylov (1859–1881), Russian revolutionary, member of Narodnaya Volya
- Valeria Mikhailova (born 2002), Russian competitive figure skater
- Vera Mikhailova (1907–1985) Soviet children's writer and journalist
- Viktor Mikhaylov (academic) (1934–2011), Russian academic and nuclear scientist
- Viktor Mikhailov (1924–2021), Soviet and Russian military officer
- Vitalii Mihailov (1976), Moldovan judoka
- Vitaly Mikhailov (born 1986), Belarusian long track speed skater
- Vladimir Mikhaylov (disambiguation), several people
- Yekaterina Mikhailova-Demina (1925–2019), Soviet military doctor, Hero of the Soviet Union
- Yevgeniya Mikhaylova (born 1949), Russian politician, educator and psychologist
- Yuri Mikhaylov (1930–2008), Soviet speed skater
