= Mikhail Mikhailov (climber) =

Kyrgyzstani mountaineer (b. 1972)

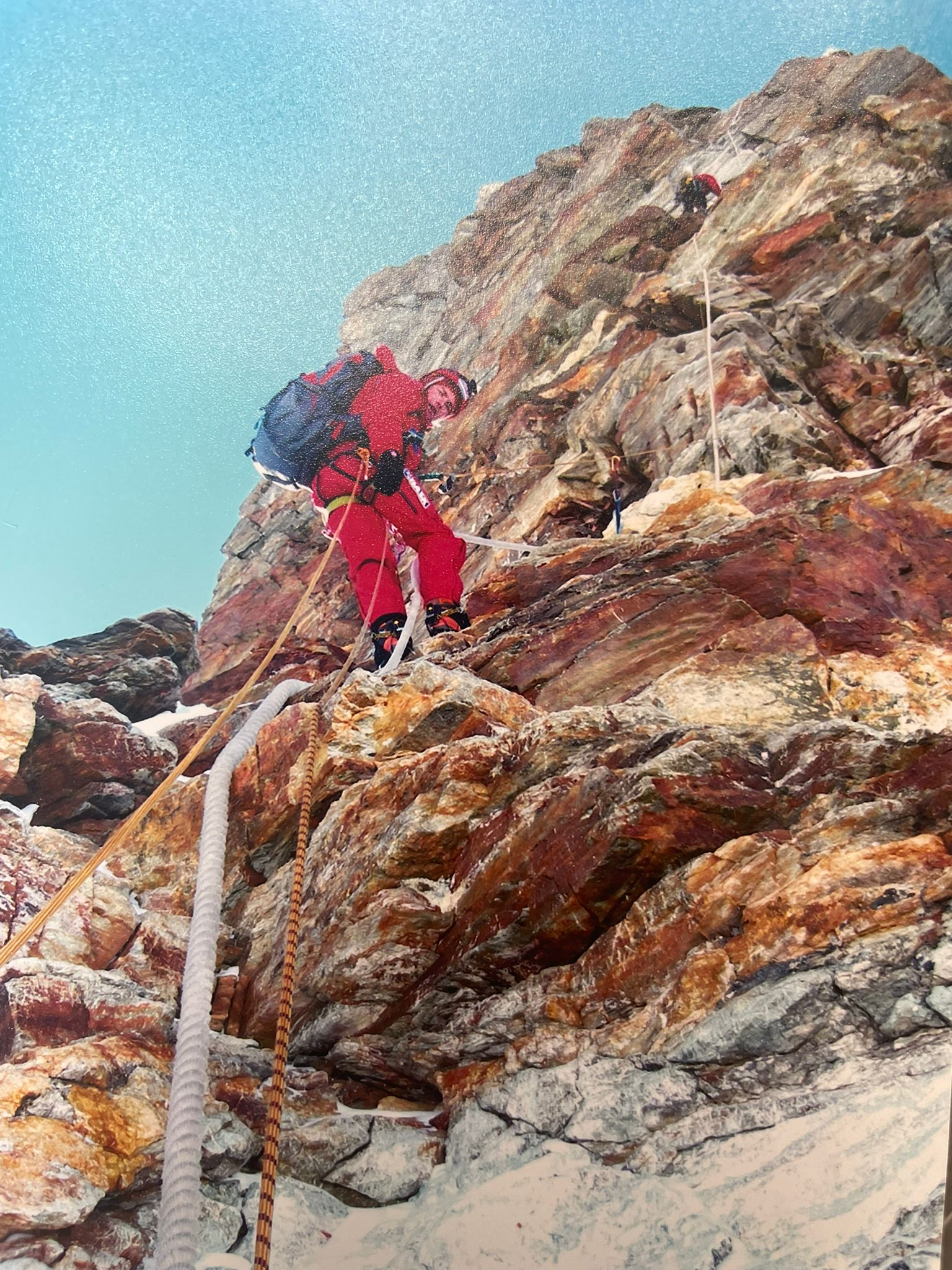
Mikhailov abseiling on the Matterhorn

Mikhail Mikhailov (born 10 August 1972) is a Kyrgyz elite level technical alpinist, climber and mountaineering and climbing instructor. In 2004 he received the Piolet d' Or for the first ascent on Jannu North Face (Alexander Odintsov, Alexander Ruchkin, Sergey Borisov, Michail Mikhailov, Gennady Kirievsky, Michail Pershin, Nikolay Totmyanin, Alexey Bolotov, Eugeny Prilepa, Dmitry Pavlenko). In 2009 he received Russian Golden Ice Axe and American Golden Piton with Alexander Ruchkin for peak 6134m Minya Konga.

== Early life ==
Mikhail was born in Frunze (now Bishkek) in a modest family. His father, Master of sports of mountain tourism of USSR, brought him to the mountains since early age. He is a multiple championand medallist at the Kyrgyz SSR Climbing Championships. In the USSR Championships he won 5th place.

However, the climbing school closed in 1988, and in Mikhail joined mountaineering club "Sport Club of Physical Culture of in Kyrgyz Republic".

== Career ==
- In 1991 he joint Central Sports Club of the Army of the Republic of Kazakhstan, Almaty. He was a professional athlete of the Ministry of Defence of the Republic of Kazakhstan. He met the athletic title "Candidate of Masters of sports in mountaineering in 1993. During this period he made ascents to peak Khan Tengri, Communism peak, Lenin peak and Pobeda West peak.
- From 1993 to 1999, he served in the Central Army Sports Club (Ministry of Defence of the Republic of Kazakhstan) rank Senior Warrant Officer on position: Mountaineering Athlete-Coach at the Central Army Sports Club specialized in mountain training for the armed forces. He was a Member of the Kazakhstan national mountaineering team. During his service, he was a multiple champion and medallist at the Kazakhstan and CIS mountaineering championships. Trained by Coach Yervand Ilyinsky. In 1994, he took part in a winter ascent of Manaslu (8,163 m) (Himalayas, Nepal).
- From 1993 to 1999, he worked for various companies as a high-altitude rigger in industrial mountaineering.
- In 1997, he took part in the Kazakhstan army expedition to Mount Everest. From the Tibetan side. An autonomous expedition without the use of high-altitude porters or established camps. Maximum ascent altitude without the use of bottled oxygen: 8,200 m.
- From 1999 to 2009, he worked for the Tien Shan Travel company. Director of the ‘Enilchek’ high-altitude mountaineering camp. Organised high-altitude ascents of Khan Tengri (7,010 m) and Pobeda Peak (7,439 m). He was also Coach of the Kyrgyzstan National Mountaineering Team. Multiple champion and medallist at the Kyrgyz Republic and CIS Mountaineering Championships.
- From 2002 to 2007, by invitation, member of the ‘Russian Way – Walls of the World’ project team (Russia). In 2004, for the first ascent of Jannu Peak (7,710 m) (Himalayas, Nepal) via the spectacular north face, he was awarded the world's highest honour, the Piolet d’Or (France), for his achievements in mountaineering. In 2007, for his ascent of Kyzyl-Asker Peak (5,842 m, Kyrgyzstan), he was awarded the ‘Best Ascent of the Year (Russia) for the first ascent of the south-east face.
- From 2007 to 2011, co-organiser of the mountaineering project ‘First Ascents in Inaccessible Mountain Regions of the World’. Climbed in a two-man team with Alexander Ruchkin on extremely difficult wall routes in alpine style.
- In 2008, for the first ascent of a 6,134-metre peak (Tibet, China), he was nominated for the world's highest honour, the Piolet d’Or (France), the prestigious Golden Piton award for the best climb of the year (USA), and the international ‘Golden Ice Axe of Russia’ award (Russia). In 2011, for his ascent of Shark Tooth (Greenland), he was awarded the ‘Best Ascent of the Year’ prize (Russia).
- Since 2023, leading "Alga Kyrgyz Alpine Club". In 2023 -2024 he was the coach of the Kyrgyzstan Youth Mountaineering Team.

The Kyrgyz Mountaineering Federation has never recognized his achievement in alpinism.

== List of ascents ==
- Traverse from Peak 5100 to Lenin Peak (7,134 m)
- Communism Peak (7,495 m) Russian classification of difficulty 5B Tamm
- Pobeda West Peak (6,918 m) – 3 ascents
- Everest to an altitude of 8,200 m
- Khan Tengri Peak (7,010 m) 6A via the right side of the North Face (first ascent)
- Khan Tengri Peak (7,010 m) 6B direct route up the North Face (first ascent)
- Khan Tengri Peak (7,010 m) 5B Kuzmin. Left edge of the North Face.
- Khan Tengri Peak (7,010 m) via the classic routes from the north and south – 7 ascents.
- Prаvda Peak 5B (6,378 m)
- Free Korea Peak 6A Popenko
- Free Korea Peak 6A Bezzubkina
- Free Korea Peak 6B Semiletkina
- Free Korea Peak 6B via the centre of the North Face (first winter ascent)
- Free Korea Peak 5B Barber (5 times)
- Free Korea Peak 5B (Bagaeva)
- Corona Peak 5th Tower 6A (Balezina – second ascent)
- Corona Peak 5th Tower 5B via the left side of the SW Face (first ascent)
- Corona Peak 5th Tower 5B (Ruzhevsky)
- Corona Peak 5th Tower 5B Sadovsky
- Corona Peak 6th Tower 5B Glukhovtsev
- Semenov-Tianshansky Peak 5B Nikiforenko
- Semenov-Tianshansky Peak 5B Zakharov
- Talgar Peak 6A Akimenko
- Talgar Peak 5B Snesarev
- Talgar Peak 5B Pelevin
- Boks Peak 5B via the Bastion of the North Face (first ascent)
- Marble Wall Peak (6,400 m) 5B via the right bastion of the Marble Wall (first ascent).
- Mramornaya Stena Peak (6,400 m) 5A via the north face (first winter ascent).
- Mramornaya Stena Peak (6,400 m) – 6 ascents via various routes.
- RGO Peak (6,357 m) 5B via the West Ridge (Second ascent)
- Grudzinski Peak (6,400 m) 5B via the West Face (first ascent)
- Pobeda Peak East (7,060 m) 6A – attempt at the second ascent of the Forostyan route, 2/3 of the route
- Nansen Peak (5,697 m) 5B via the buttress of the north face (winter first ascent)
- Admiralteets Peak 6A via the pillar
- Kurumdy Peak (6,613 m) 5B via the buttress of the north slope (first ascent)
- Matterhorn (winter ascent)
- Uch-Chat Peak 5A (winter first ascent)
- Jannu Peak (7,710 m) 6B direct route up the north face (first ascent) – Piolet d’Or award (France).
- Masherbrum Peak (7,821 m) (first ascent attempt)
- Kyzyl-Asker Peak (5,832 m) 6B South-East Face (first ascent) – Best Climb of the Year (Russia)
- 13 May 2009 Peak 6,134 m, Minya Konka Range, Eastern Tibet, Sichuan Province, China 6B (first ascent) – Climbing with A. Ruchkin. Awards – Golden Piton (USA), Piolet d’Or shortlist of nominees, Golden Ice Axe (Russia).
- 5 May 2010 Shark Tooth Peak,Greenland 6B (first ascent) – Climbing with A. Ruchkin. Awards – Best Climb of the Year (Russia)
- Monte Rosa – Gran Paradiso – Mont Blanc (ski descent from three peaks in one week)
