= Tutta Larsen =

Russian journalist (born 1974)

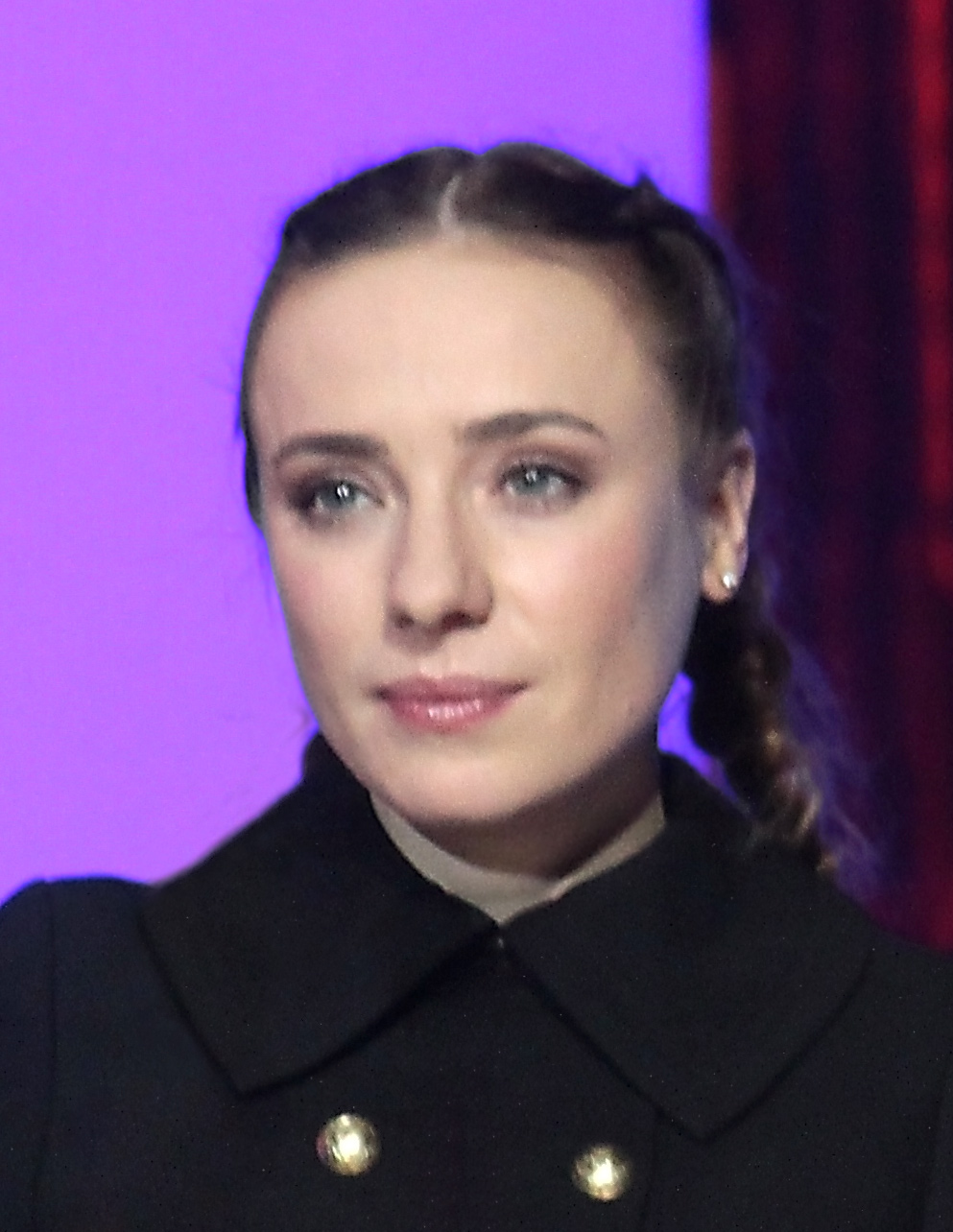
- Larsen in 2009
- Born: Tatyana Anatolyevna Romanenko; 7 May 1974 (age 52); Khanzhonkove-Pivnichne, Makiivka, Ukrainian SSR, Soviet Union
- Education: MSU Faculty of Journalism

Tutta Larsen (Russian: Тутта Лаpсeн; born 5 July 1974 in Khanzhonkove-Pivnichne, Makiivka, Donetsk Oblast, Ukraine, USSR), born Tatyana Anatolyevna Romanenko (Russian: Татьяна Анатoльeвна Poманeнкo) is a VJ and TV presenter.

She worked at the MTV Russia (1998 and 2008), Stolitsa FM, Channel Mother and Child and is the founder and leader of TUTTA.TV.

== Biography ==
When Tatyana was seven years old, her father left the family. Her mother remarried. Her stepfather, Yuri Belenky (born 4 May 1956), was a film producer. At school she loved to organize matinees, plays, contest KVN. She studied English and ballet, and was fond of cycling and football, as well as extreme tourism, mountain climbing, rock climbing, kayaking, and orienteering. In 1990 in Makeyevka she graduated from music school in classical guitar, and in 1991 from a comprehensive school with a gold medal.

Immediately after school she went to Moscow and entered the MSU Faculty of Journalism. During her studies in 1994, she trained in the advertising department of the company BIZ-Enterprises, where she began a career as a TV presenter. At that time, Tatyana began to use the pseudonym Tutta Larsen, derived from the names of the red fox cub Ludwig Larsen and the young chicken Tutta Carlson - fairy-tale characters of the Swedish children's writer Jan-Olof Ekholm

In 1996-1998, Tutta Larsen worked as a leading music programs on the channel Muz-TV. From 1996 to 2000 she was a DJ on the Radio Maximum. From September 1998 to July 2008 she worked as a DJ on the channel MTV Russia; she did live interviews, conducted music news, charts, talk shows about the problems of modern youth, a game show, and an awards ceremony channel. The new genre of music programs involved the transformation of the speaker into the VJ, a dialogue with the audience, etc. The music channel became a window into the world of youth.

Tutta Larsen was a soloist with the bands Jazzlobster and Thaivox, and recorded as a singer more than one album. In 1998 she released her only album «Newbodyforms».

In addition, she appeared in several music videos and was a guest star in several television series.

From 2007, she worked on the Radio Mayak together with Dmitry Glukhovsky, later with Konstantin Mikhailov, Vladimir Averin and Gia Saralidze и «Центральный комитет». In 2010, Radio Mayak in Barnaul hosted the evening The Show Hit Home with Tutta Larsen and Gia Saralidze.

In 2008, after working for ten years on MTV Russia, Tutta Larsen moved to the TV channel Zvezda, where at the end of the year she released two documentaries about the Great Patriotic War.

From 23 April 2010 to 15 August 2014 one of the leading talk shows was Girls on the channel Russia 1.

In 2012, Tutta Larsen became a member of the Russian jury Eurovision Song Contest 2012.

In May 2015 she launched her own channel TUTTA.TV, dedicated to the issues of motherhood, parenting, psychology and relationships.

=== Personal life ===
Larsen's first husband was Maxim Galstyan, a musician and guitarist. She was in a long-term relationship with journalist and writer Zakhar Artemyev, the older brother of singer Pavel Artemyev. From that partnership a son was born in May 2005. Her second husband is Valery Koloskov. The couple shares two children, a daughter born in 2010 and a son born in 2015.
