= Anna Stetsenko =

Anna Stetsenko may refer to:

- Anna Stetsenko (psychologist)
- Anna Stetsenko (swimmer)
