= Ala-Archa Nature Park =

National park in Kyrgyzstan

- IUCN category II (national park)
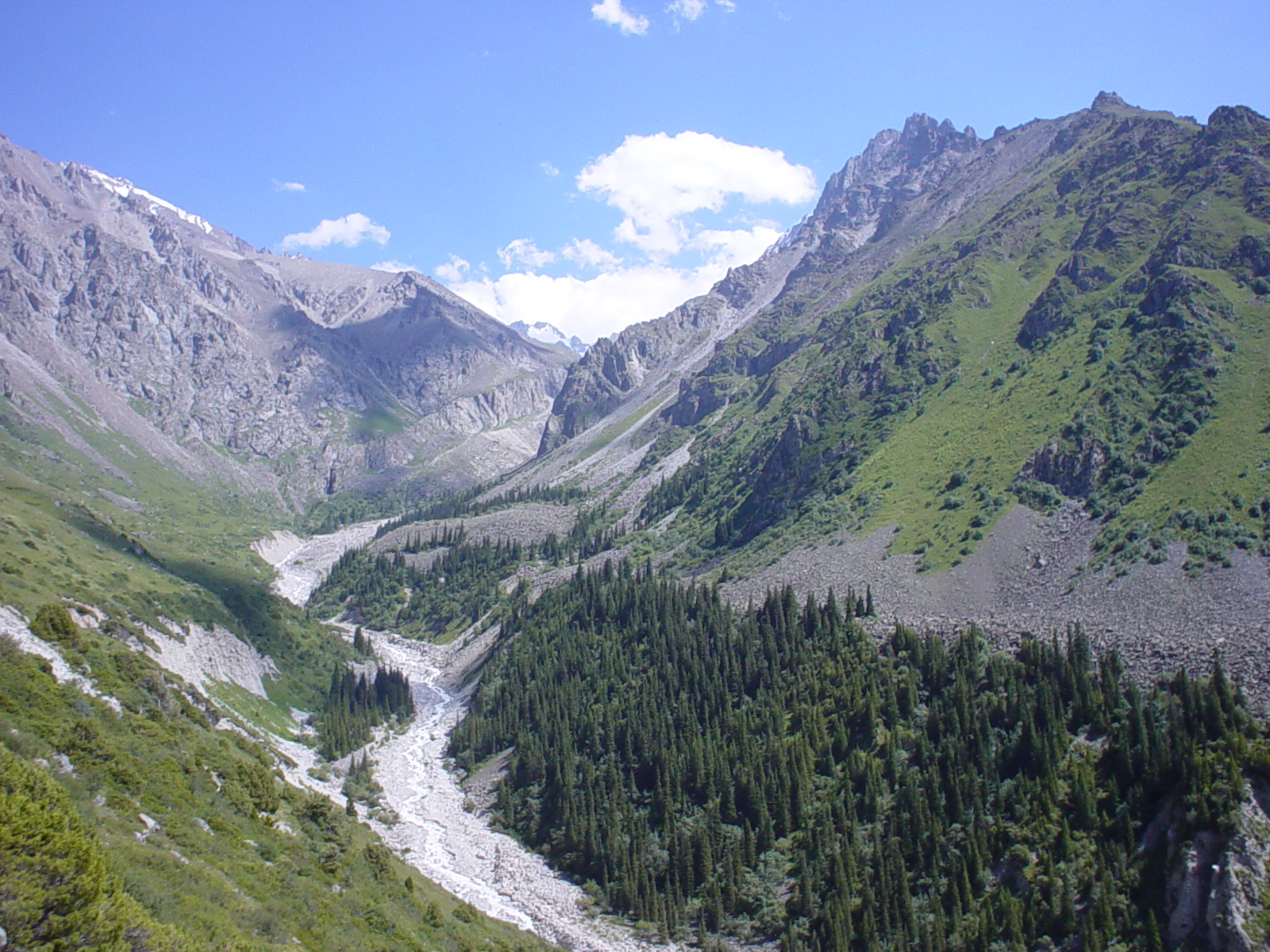
- Looking up the Ala Archa river valley

- Location within Kyrgyzstan
- Location: Chüy Region, Kyrgyzstan
- Nearest city: Bishkek
- Coordinates: 42°35′N 74°29′E
- Area: 164.8 square kilometres (64 mi^{2})
- Established: 1976
- Website: alaarchapark.kg

The Ala-Archa Nature Park (Kyrgyz: Ала-Арча кыргыз мамлекеттик жаратылыш паркы, Russian: Государственный природный национальный парк Ала-Арча) is an alpine national park in the Tian Shan mountains of Kyrgyzstan, located approximately 35 km south of the capital city of Bishkek. Established in 1976, it currently covers 16,485 hectares.

== Name ==
The nature park is named after the river that flows through it, Ala-Archa. In Kyrgyz, the archa, which is the base of the river's and the park's names, is a bright or many-colored juniper which are held in special esteem in Kyrgyz folklore, with Kyrgyz traditionally using smoke from its burning wood to chase away evil spirits. However, the archa is not meant to be planted too near to the home, because it is believed to slowly to deplete the energy from humans living close by.

== Geography ==
The park covers about 165 square kilometers, and its altitude ranges from about 1,500 meters at the entrance to a maximum of 4,895 meters at Semenov-Tian-Shansky Peak, the highest peak in the Kyrgyz Ala-Too Range of the Tian Shan. There are more than 20 small and large glaciers and some 50 mountain peaks within the park. The total area of the glaciers in the park is 53.6 km^{2} (20.7 sq mi).

Two smaller rivers, the Adygene and the Ak-Sai, originate from these glaciers' melting waters. The Adygene gorge is a wooded valley with waterfalls, springs and abundant trout.

The park includes the gorge of the river Ala-Archa and the mountains surrounding it.

== Mountains ==
Mountain climbing is a popular activity within the park, which offers several peaks in the 4000m class:

- Semenov-Tian-Shansky Peak (4895m)
- Korona Peak (4860m)
- Free Korea Peak (4740m)

== Biosphere ==
A small reservoir on the Kargay-Bulak river was built to study the Amu Darya trout. Other wildlife includes the very rare snow leopard (in Kyrgyz: "ilbirs") on the alpine meadows and snowfields above 2,500 m elevation, wild goats, roe deer and marmots.

A park camera photographed a snow leopard for the first time in May 2017.

Many plants can be found in the park, including the Crocus alatavicus.

== Gallery ==
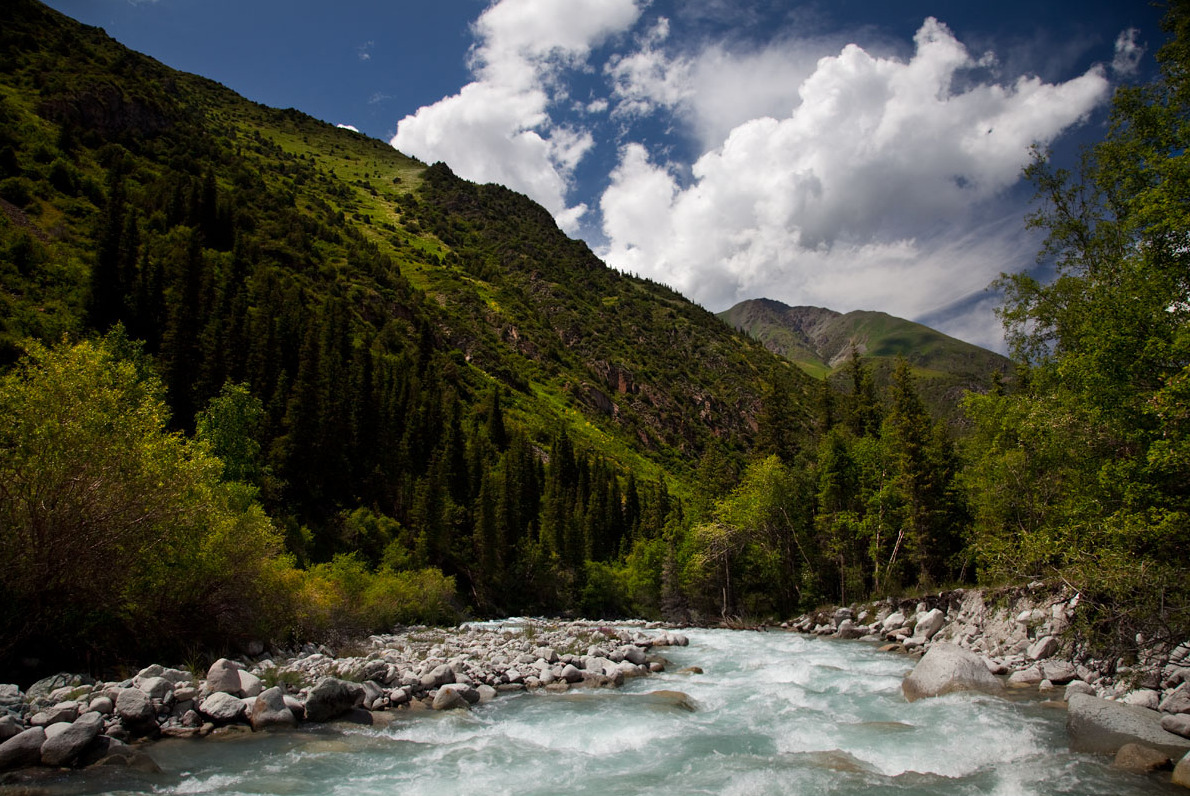
Ala Archa River

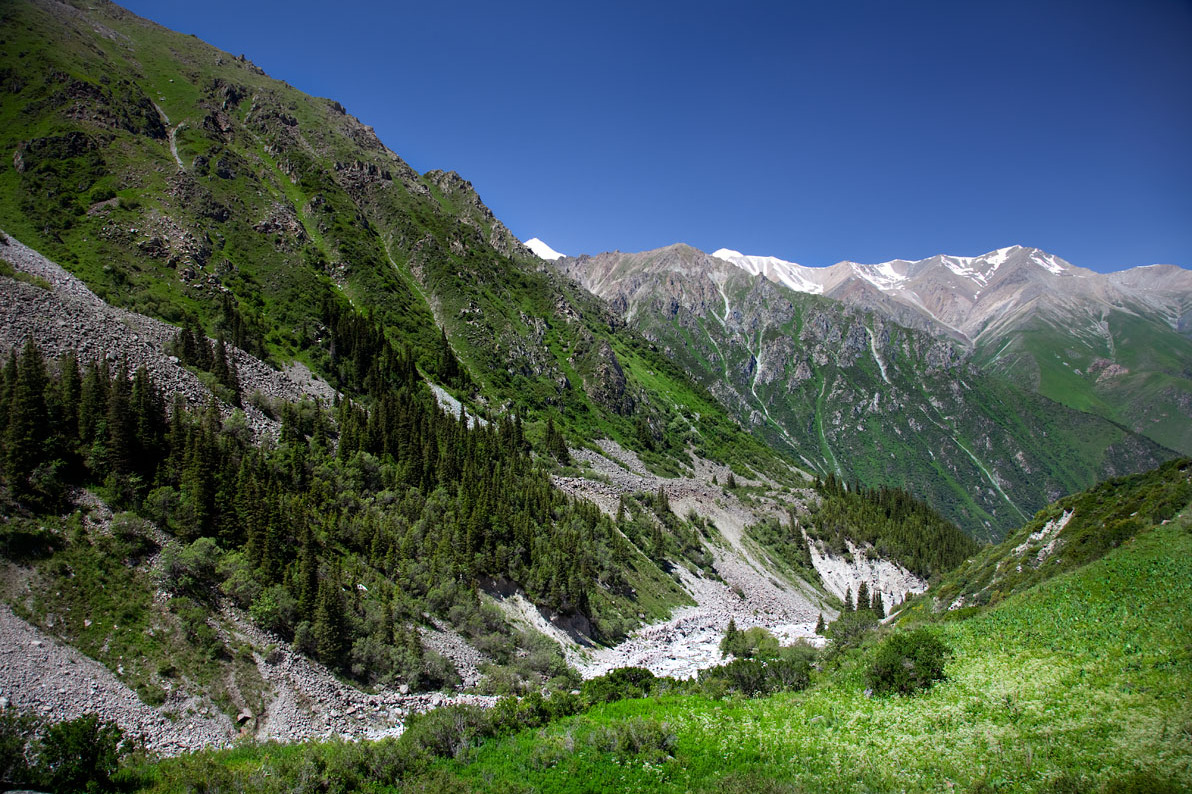
Ala Archa National Park

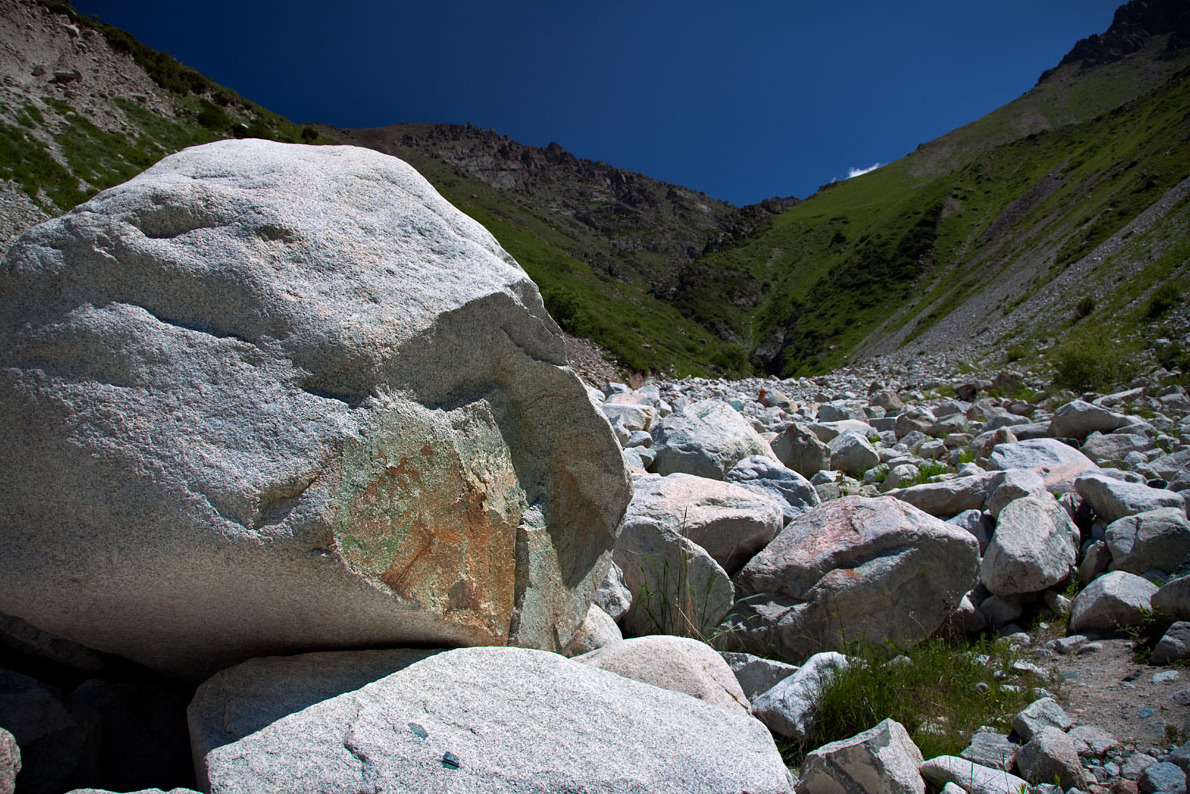
A boulder field at Ala Archa National Park

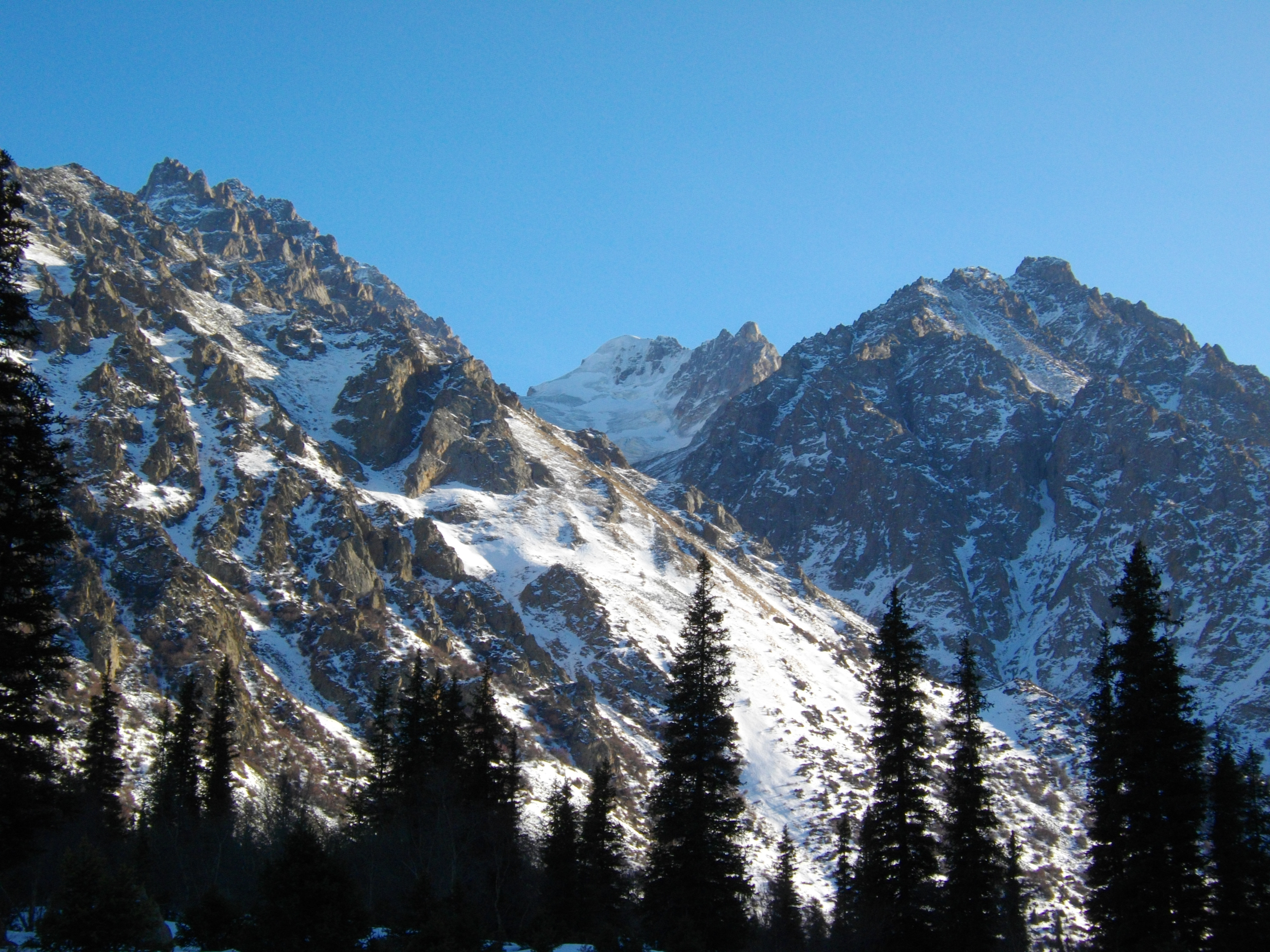
At Ala Archa National Park

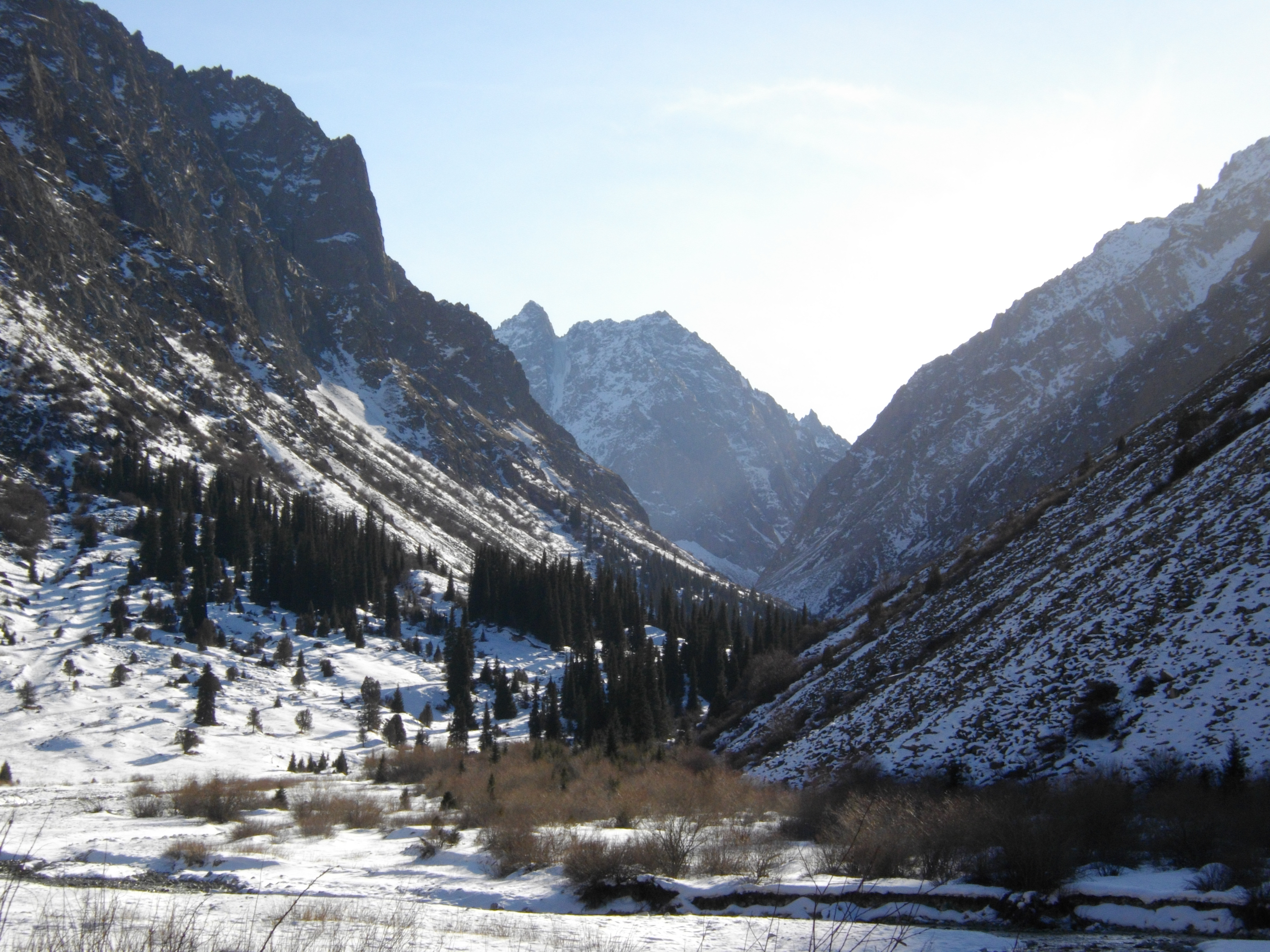
At Ala Archa National Park

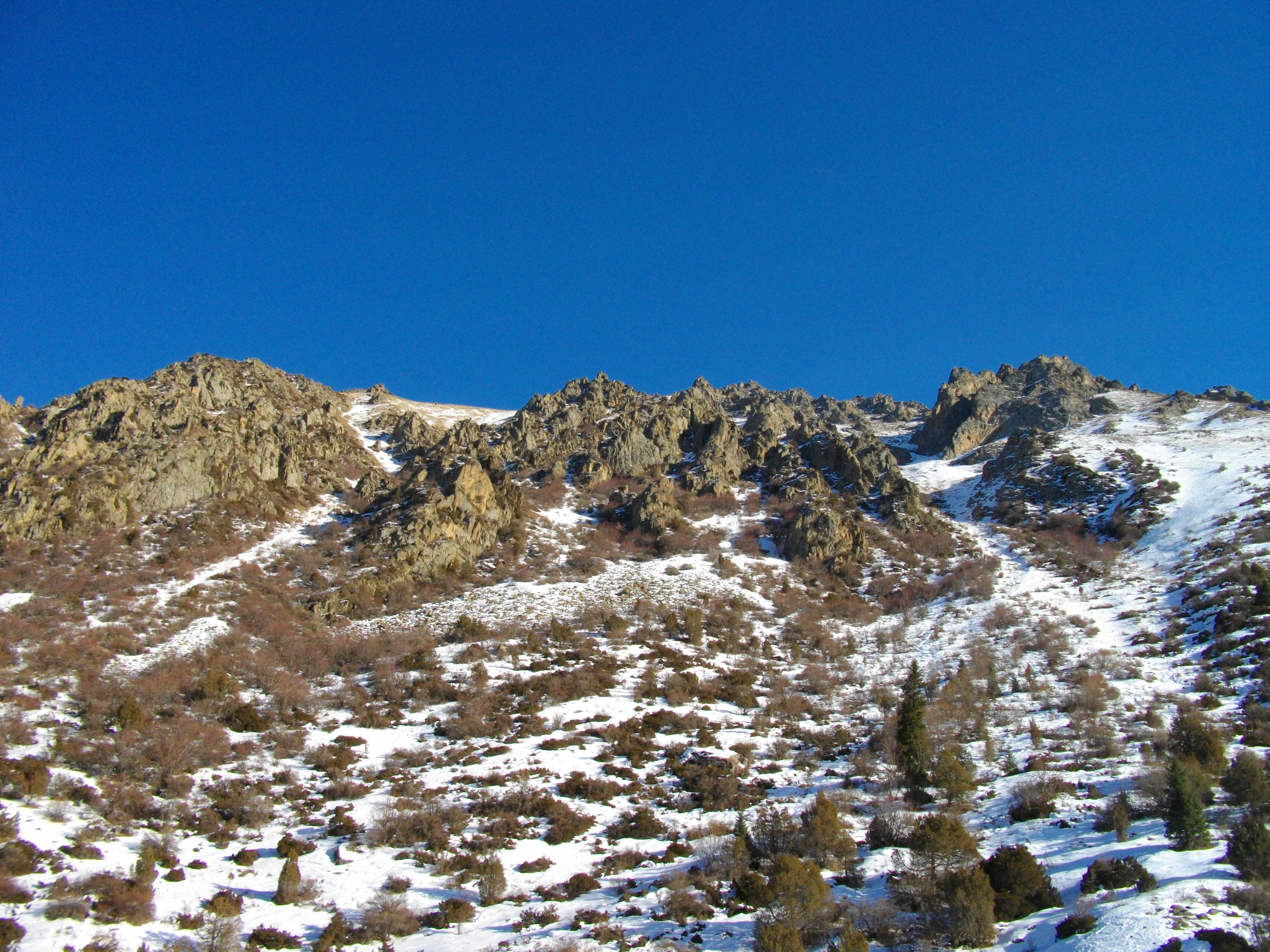
At Ala Archa National Park

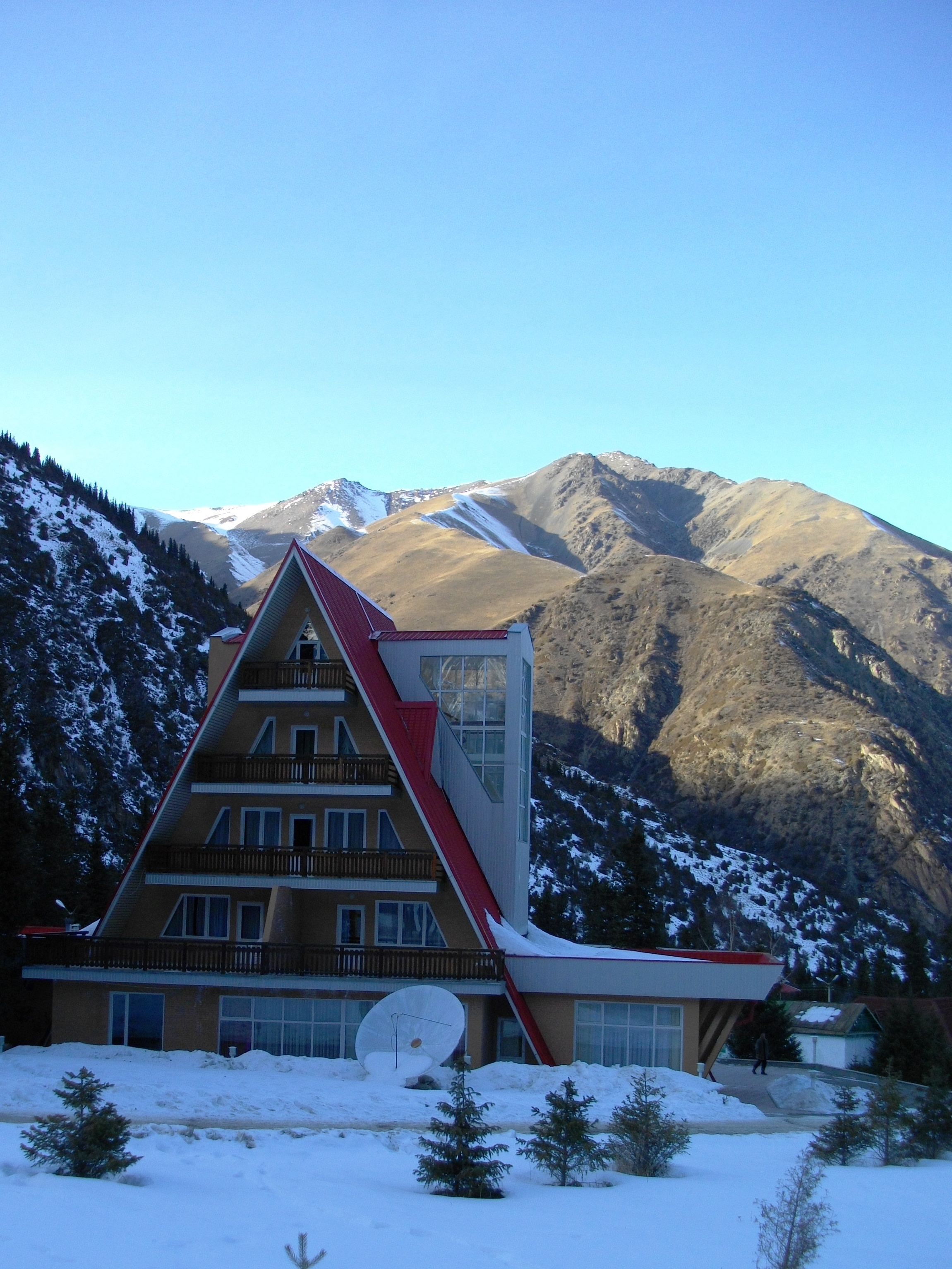
At Ala Archa National Park

== Tourism ==
The park is a destination point for weekend picnickers, hikers, horse trekkers, skiers as well as mountain climbers looking for ice, rock and mixed routes. The park is open year-round, although the most popular season is late summer and early fall. Every May 1, hundreds of people camp out in the valley and climb Mount Komsomolets for the Alpinada festival.

There is a nominal fee for entering the park. Past the gate, the road continues 12 km to a small collection of buildings, including one newly renovated lodge. At the end of the road, up a trail to the left (East), lies the Ak-Sai Glacier, where remains of a Soviet climbing base indicate the high quality mountaineering within the park. The Soviet climbing base (Ratsek Hut) has been recently improved and is acting as a base for rock climbers. The region's most famous peaks rise from the Ak-Sai glacier, including Korona Peak (4860m) and Free Korea Peak (4740m). To the west of Ala Archa Valley is a trail to the Adygene valley where a climbers' cemetery is located. A third main trail continues down the center of the Ala-Archa valley for 10 km to an old, now abandoned, ski area and numerous other 4000m peaks.

In December 2016, a map of every country's most popular tourist site published by TripAdvisor indicated that the Ala Archa Gorge was the most popular destination in Kyrgyzstan.
