= Anna Stetsenko (psychologist) =

Soviet psychologist

- Occupation: Professor of Psychology

Academic background
- Education: PhD at Moscow State University

Academic work
- Discipline: Developmental Psychology, Urban Education
- Institutions: CUNY Graduate Center
- Website: https://annastetsenko.ws.gc.cuny.edu/

Anna Stetsenko is a developmental psychologist known for her contributions to cultural-historical activity theory, building on the work of Lev Vygotsky, Leontiev and Alexander Luria. Her research centers human development, education, and social theory.

Stetsenko is a professor of psychology and urban education at the CUNY Graduate Center, and is the training area head for the developmental psychology PhD program.

== Education and career ==
Stetsenko received her PhD in general and developmental psychology from Moscow State University in 1984. During her time at Moscow State University, she worked with scholars such as Alexei Leontiev and Vasily Davydov. She worked as a postdoctoral research fellow at the Max Planck Institute for Human Development and Education in Berlin. She was an invited visiting fellow at the Center of Cultural Studies in Vienna. From 1993 to 1999, Stetsenko was an assistant professor at the Department of Developmental Psychology at the University of Bern, Switzerland.

Stetsenko was appointed to the CUNY Graduate Center as an associate professor in 1999, and went on to be a full professor of psychology and urban education. In her ongoing tenure, Stetsenko has published research on agency, personhood, and human development, from the lens of social change. She has served as the principal advisor on more than 20 PhD dissertations.

She serves on the editorial boards for several academic journals, including the Journal of Psycholinguistic Research, Mind, Culture, and Activity, and Experimental Psychology (Russia). Stetsenko has published a number of books, including The Transformative Mind: Expanding Vygotsky's Approach to Development and Education. She has contributed chapters to influential books, such as The Essential Vygotsky and The World's Youth: Adolescence in Eight Regions of the Globe. Her writing has been published in English, Russian, German and French.

Stetsenko has been a keynote speaker at the International Society of Cultural and Activity Research Congress, Literacy Research Association Congress, and the Nordic Education Research Association.

== Honors and awards ==
Stetsenko has received numerous grants and awards from agencies, such as the Swiss National Science Foundation and the Spencer Foundation. In 2009, Stetsenko was awarded a National Science Foundation grant as a co-Principal Investigator for "The Scientific Thinker" project. In 2023, Stetsenko was honored by the American Education Research Association for Lifetime Contributions to Cultural-Historical Research.

== Research ==
Stetsenko studies human development in varied contexts including educational settings. She is known for her contribution to Vygotskian activity theory. Stetsenko's research involves socio-cultural activity theory and its potential positive and negative outcomes within the human development and learning. She has carried out extensive empirical research on adolescents and social development, closely related to issues of gender, self-concept and motivation. Her works are closely connected with the social-cultural interaction and daily activities of adolescents and children.

In 2017, Stetsenko published "The Transformative Mind: Expanding Vygotsky's Approach to Development and Education". This book explores Vygotsky's theoretical work and discusses contemporary issues in the social sciences. Building on Vygotsky's approach, Stetsenko outlines the transformative activist stance, a perspective on human development that posits that people are shaped by and actively shape their social worlds.

== Books ==
- Bakhurst, D., Blunden, A., Brunila, M., Camillo, J., Chaiklin, S., Cole, M., Smet, B. D., Engeström, Y., Hasse, C., Rodrigues, A. M., Mattos, C., Nardi, B., Oittinen, V., Rantavuori, J., Sannino, A., Stetsenko, A., Yamazumi, K. (2024). Activity Theory: An Introduction. Germany: ibidem-Verlag.
- Stetsenko, A. (2017). The transformative mind: Expanding Vygotsky's approach to development and education. Cambridge University Press.
- Stetsenko, A. (2005). Rozhdenie soznanija: stanovlenie znachenij na rannih etapah zhizni [The birth of consciousness: The development of meanings in early ontogeny]. Moscow: CheRo Press.
- Robbins, D., Stetsenko, A. (2002). Voices Within Vygotsky's Non-classical Psychology: Past, Present, Future. United States: Nova Science.

== Selected publications ==
- Stetsenko, A. Radicalizing Theory and Vygotsky: Addressing Crisis Through Activist-Transformative Methodology. Hu Arenas 7, 311–328 (2024). https://doi.org/10.1007/s42087-022-00299-2
- Stetsenko, A. (2023). Cultural-historical activity theory and its contemporary import: Ideas emerging in context and time. Cultural-Historical Psychology, 19(1), 20–29. https://doi.org/10.17759/chp.2023190103
- Stetsenko, A. (2008). From relational ontology to transformative activist stance on development and learning: Expanding Vygotsky’s (CHAT) project. Cultural Studies of Science Education, 3, 471-491. https://doi.org/10.1007/s11422-008-9111-3
- Stetsenko, A. (2005). Activity as Object-Related: Resolving the Dichotomy of Individual and Collective Planes of Activity. Mind, Culture, and Activity, 12(1), 70–88. https://doi.org/10.1207/s15327884mca1201_6
- Stetsenko, A., & Arievitch, I. M. (2004). The Self in Cultural-Historical Activity Theory: Reclaiming the Unity of Social and Individual Dimensions of Human Development. Theory & Psychology, 14(4), 475-503. https://doi.org/10.1177/0959354304044921
