= Ushba =

Mountain in Georgia

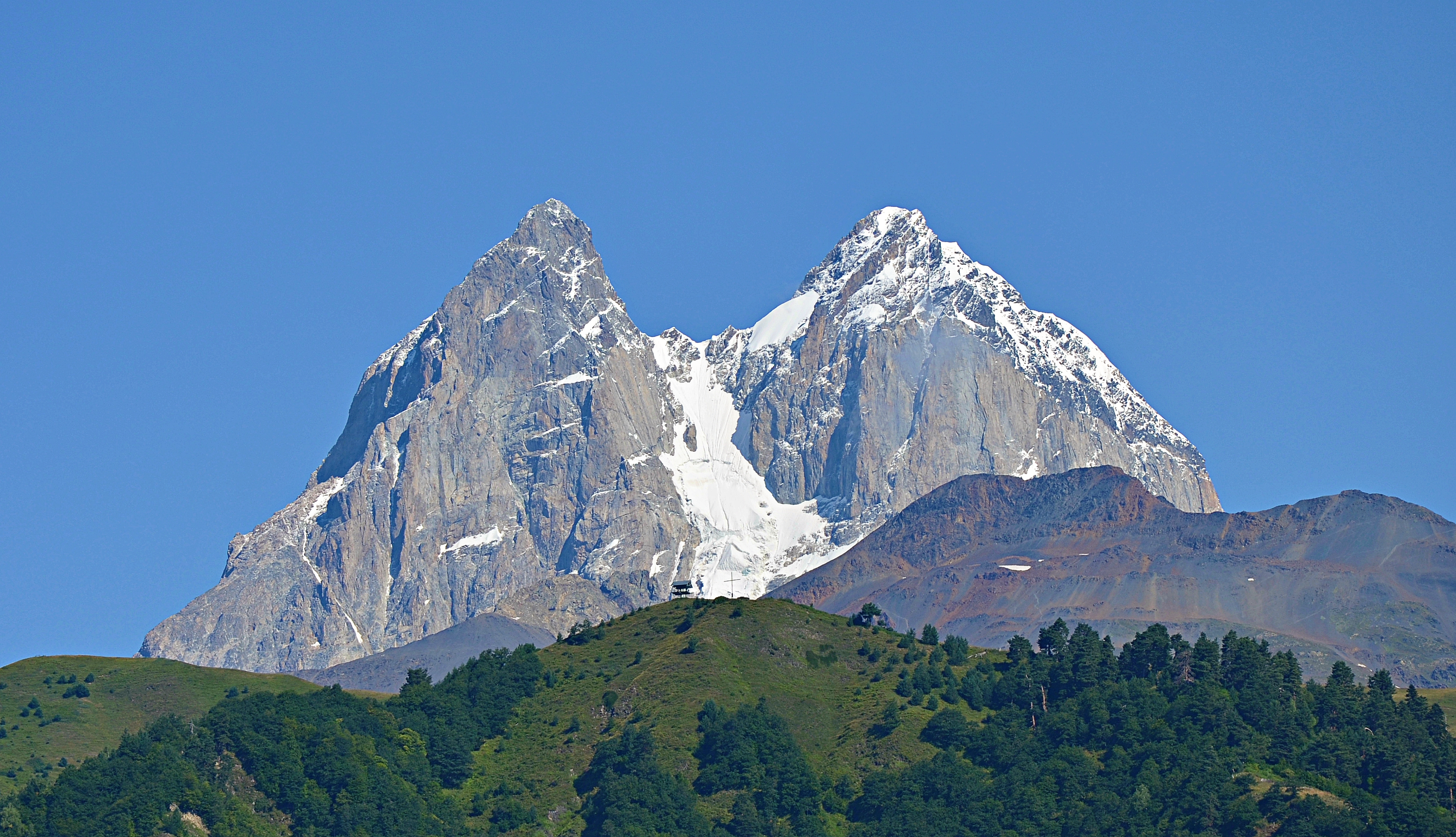
- Ushba

Highest point
- Elevation: 4,710 m (15,450 ft)
- Prominence: 1,222 m (4,009 ft)
- Isolation: 28.28 km (17.57 mi)
- Listing: Ribu
- Coordinates: 43.12486°N 42.65901°E

Geography
- Location within Georgia Location within Samegrelo-Zemo Svaneti
- Location: Svaneti region, Georgia
- Country: Georgia
- Parent range: Greater Caucasus Mountains

Climbing
- First ascent: 26 July 1903 by expedition led by Willi Rickmer Rickmers
- Easiest route: Northeast Ridge (to North Summit) (AD+/Russian 4a)

Ushba (Georgian: უშბა) is one of the most notable peaks of the Caucasus Mountains. It is located in the Svaneti region of Georgia, just south of the border with the Kabardino-Balkaria region of Russia. Although it does not rank in the 10 highest peaks of the range, Ushba is known as the "Matterhorn of the Caucasus" for its picturesque, spire-shaped double summit. Ushba is considered by many climbers as the most difficult ascent in the Caucasus.

In Georgian mythology, Ushba was thought to be the home of the hunting goddess Dali.

== Geography ==
Ushba's south summit is slightly higher than its north summit, which has an elevation of 4,690 m (15,387 ft). Although the length of the so-called “Ushba Traverse” route varies between 1,500 and 2,000 meters due to the complexity of the terrain and the descent to the saddle, the straight-line horizontal (geometric) distance between the summits is 636.9 meters. The north summit was first climbed in 1888 by John Garforth Cokklin and Ulrich Almer, while the south summit saw its first ascent in 1903 by a German-Swiss-Austrian expedition led by Willi Rickmer Rickmers.

Ushba's north summit is more accessible than the south summit: the standard route, the Northeast Ridge, ascends from the Russian side of the range to a high plateau and thence to the summit. (Hence a summit ascent on this route technically involves crossing the border.) The route is graded French AD+ or Russian 4a. Routes on the south summit, from the Georgian side, include two routes graded French ED.

== Soviet era ==
Prior to the discovery in the late 1980s of the 4810m Peak 4810 in Karavshin, Ushba, together with Chatyn-Tau and Free Korea Peak in Kyrgyzstan, were considered some of the most difficult and prestigious peaks to climb in the former Soviet Union.

== Recent history ==
In August 2012, thunderstorms made the ascent of Ushba treacherous. One climber died and another, Andranik Miribyan, was stuck near the summit for four days after becoming trapped on a ledge by heavy snowfall. Due to high winds, rescuers were unable to reach him by helicopter and Andranik made the decision to descend the mountain, despite having no ice axe after his broke while clearing snow.

Russian tourists Victoria Bushuyeva, 30, and Andrey Sidorov, 36, went missing on Ushba in September, 2013.

In May 2025, Georgian mountaineer and mountain guide Nikoloz Faliani died following a fall during a mountaineering expedition on Ushba. Three other members of the group were evacuated by helicopter from an altitude of approximately 3,600 metres.

== Bibliography ==
- Irving, R. L. G., Ten Great Mountains (London, J. M. Dent & Sons, 1940)
