= Konstantin Mikhailov =

Konstantin Mikhailov could be:

- Konstantin Mikhaylov (journalist) (born 1965), Russian journalist
- Konstantin Mihailov (born 1964), a Bulgarian ice hockey goaltender
- Konstantin Mikhailov, Russian paramilitary and convict
