= Mikhail Mikhaylov =

Mikhail Mikhaylov or Mikhail Mikhailov is the name of:

- Mikhail Mikhailov (climber) (born 1972), Kyrgyzstani mountaineer
- Mikhail Mikhailov (writer) (1829–1865), Russian writer
- Mikhail Mikhaylov (tenor) (1858–1929), Russian opera singer (tenor)
- Mykhaylo Mykhaylov (born 1959), Soviet Ukrainian footballer
- Mikhail Mikhaylov (footballer) (born 1981), Russian footballer
