= Eduard Mikhaylov =

Russian footballer

Personal information
- Full name: Eduard Aleksandrovich Mikhaylov
- Date of birth: 2 June 1972 (age 54)
- Height: 1.85 m (6 ft 1 in)
- Positions: Forward; midfielder

Senior career*
| Years | Team | Apps | (Gls) |
| 1990 | Rostselmash Rostov-on-Don | 2 | (0) |
| 1990–1992 | SKA Rostov-on-Don | 32 | (4) |
| 1992–1993 | Rostselmash Rostov-on-Don | 7 | (0) |
| 1992–1993 | → Rostselmash-2 Rostov-on-Don (loan) | 38 | (4) |
| 1994–1995 | Metallurg Magnitogorsk | 24 | (0) |
- * Club domestic league appearances and goals

Eduard Aleksandrovich Mikhaylov (Russian: Эдуард Александрович Михайлов; born 2 June 1972) is a former Russian football player.
