= Free Korea Peak =

Mountain in Kyrgyzstan

- Pik Svobodnaya Koreya
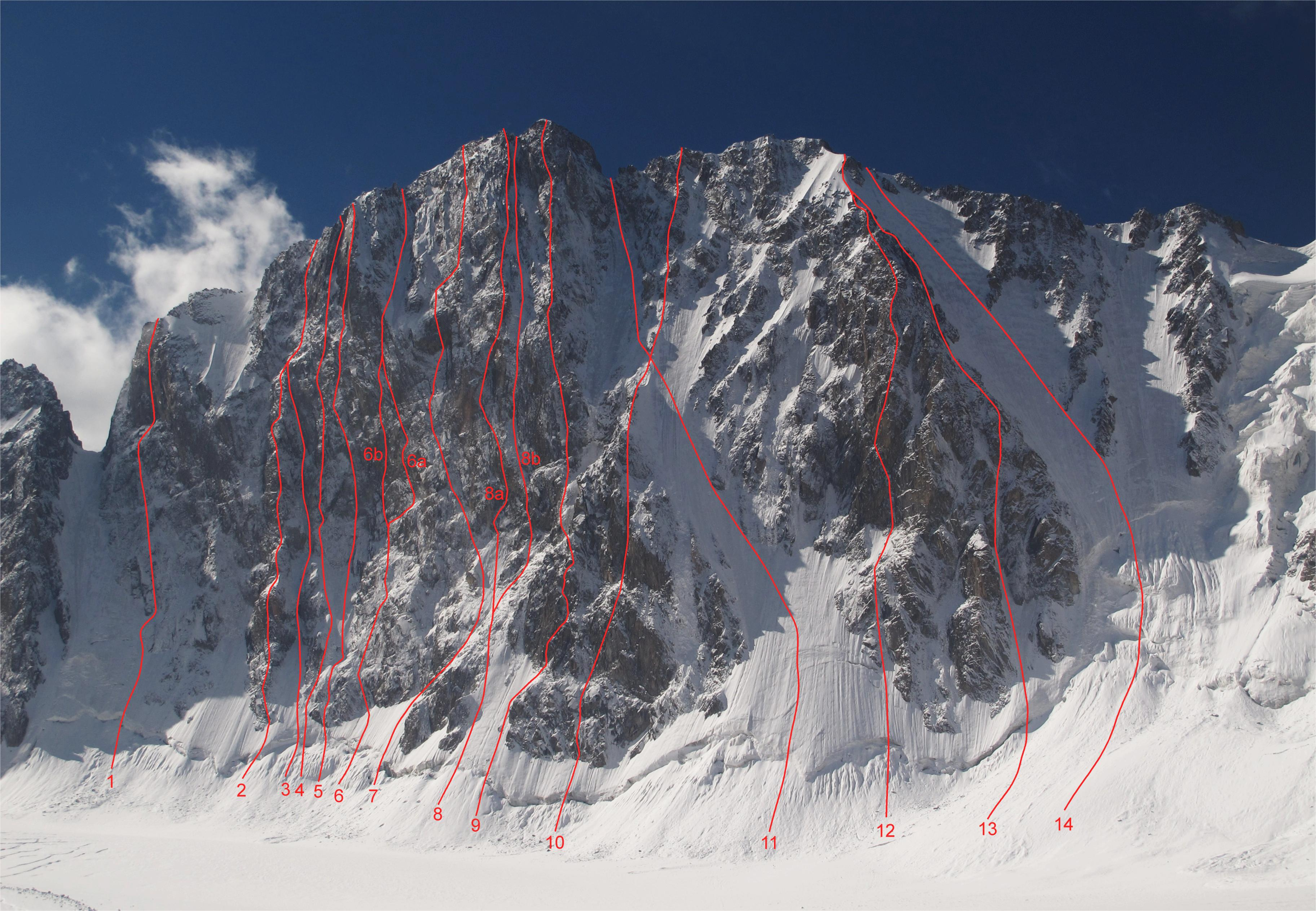
- The northern face

Highest point
- Elevation: 4,740 m (15,550 ft)
- Coordinates: 42°29′46″N 74°32′59″E

Geography
- Location within Kyrgyzstan
- Location: Kyrgyzstan
- Parent range: Kyrgyz Ala-Too Range, Tian Shan

Free Korea Peak (Russian: Пик Свободная Корея, romanized: Pik Svobodnaya Koreya) is a mountain in the Kyrgyz Ala-Too Range of the Tian Shan. It is located in Ala Archa National Park in Kyrgyzstan. It is one of the most famous peaks in the former Soviet Union, with a 900m wall on its northern face that is famously challenging to climb.

Sources differ on Free Korea Peak's elevation, with both 4740m and 4777m quoted. To its north and slightly to the west lies the Ak-Sai Glacier.

== History ==
The first ascent along the northern wall was made by an expedition led by V. Andreev in 1959.

Prior to the discovery in the late 1980s of the 4810m Peak 4810 in Karavshin, Free Korea Peak, together with Ushba and Chatyn-Tau in the Caucasus, were considered some of the most difficult and prestigious peaks to climb in the former Soviet Union.

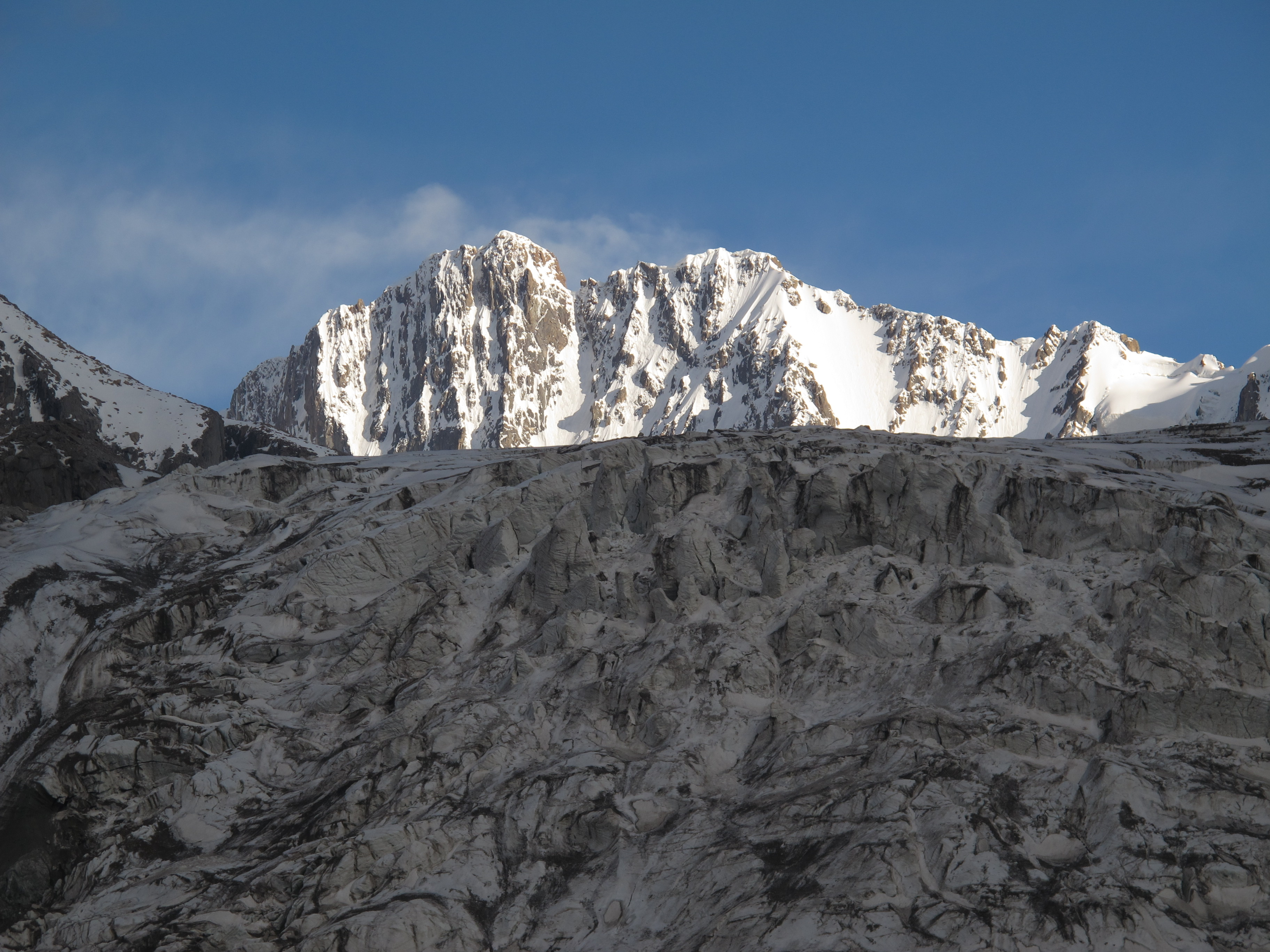
Viewed from the north. Ak-Sai Glacier is in the foreground.

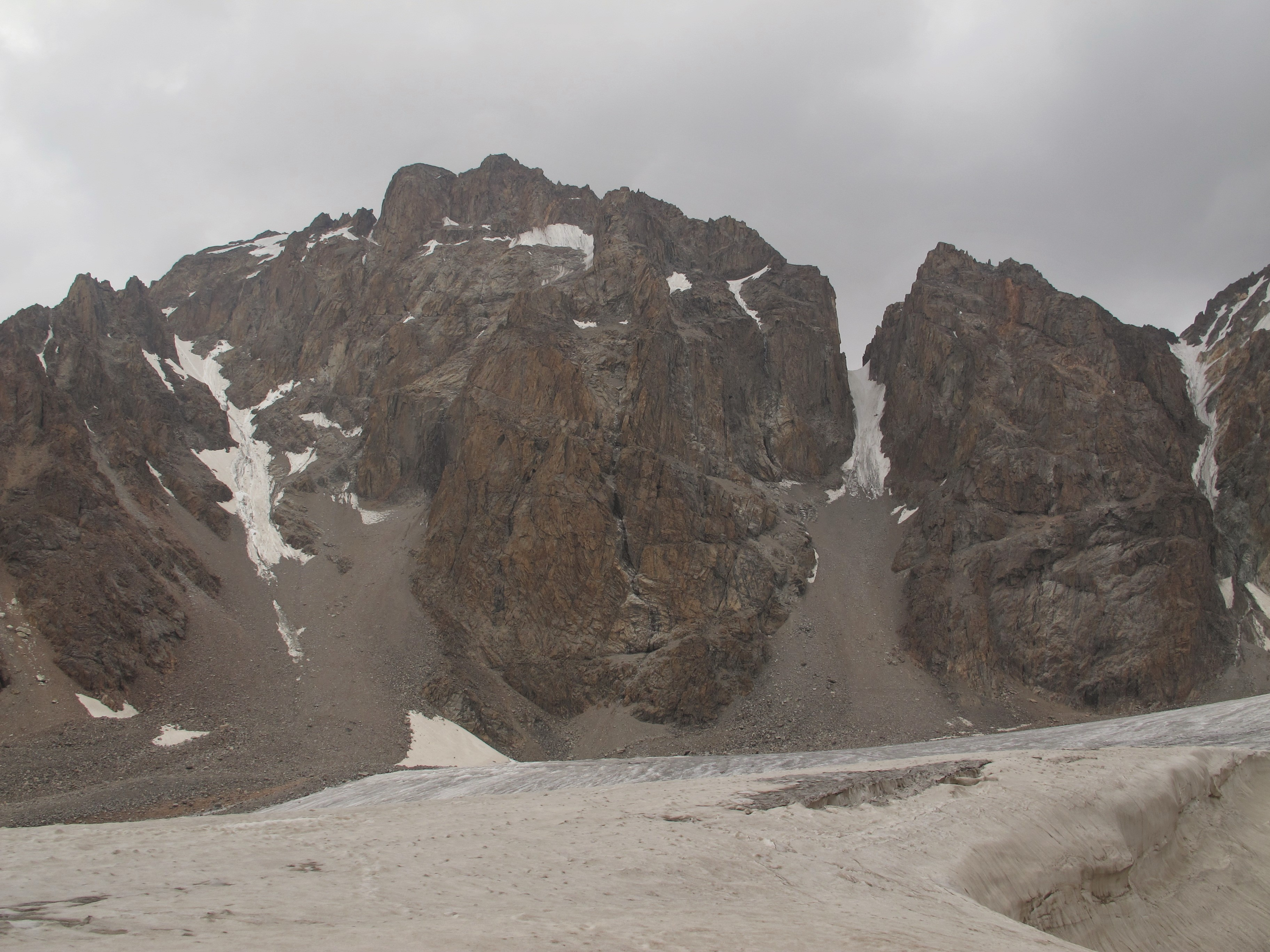
The southern face
