= Anatoly Mikhaylov =

Anatoly Mikhaylov may refer to:

- Anatoly Mikhaylov (hurdler) (1936–2022), Soviet hurdler
- Anatoly Mikhaylov (radiologist) (1936–2026), Belarusian radiologist
