= Semenov-Tian-Shansky Peak =

Mountain in Kyrgyzstan

- Pik Semonova-Tyan'shanskogo, Alamedin Peak
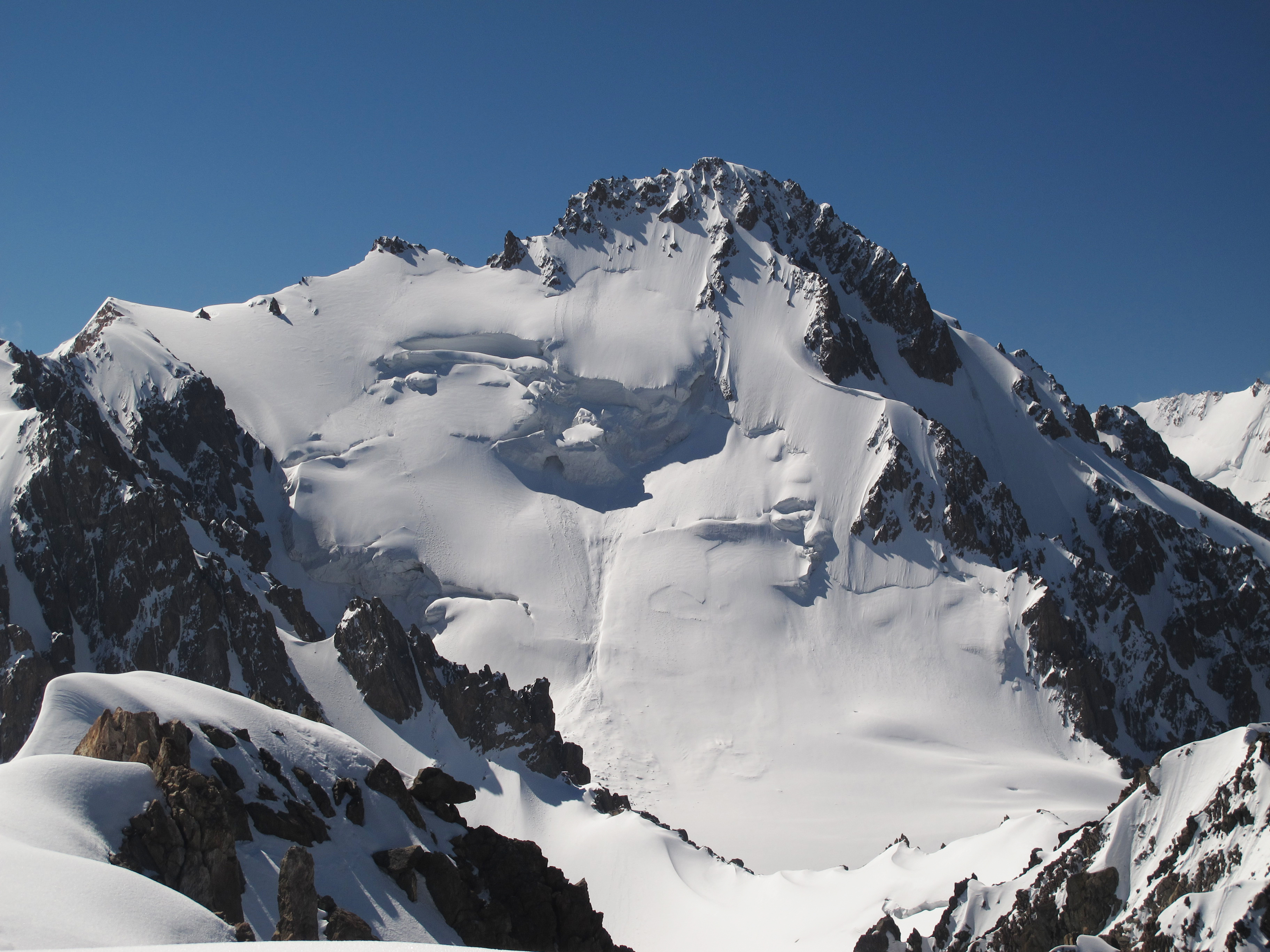
- The view from Uchitel Peak in the northwest

Highest point
- Elevation: 4,895 m (16,060 ft)
- Prominence: 2,231 m (7,320 ft)
- Isolation: 233.57 km (145.13 mi)
- Coordinates: 42°31′16″N 74°34′18″E

Geography
- Location within Kyrgyzstan
- Location: Kyrgyzstan
- Parent range: Kyrgyz Ala-Too Range, Tian Shan

Semenov-Tian-Shansky Peak (Russian: Пик Семёнова-Тяньшанского, romanized: Pik Semonova-Tyan'shanskogo, Kyrgyz: Аламүдүн чокусу, romanized: Alamüdün çokusu, lit. 'Alamedin Peak') is a mountain in the Kyrgyz Ala-Too Range of the Tian Shan. It is located in Ala Archa National Park in Kyrgyzstan. It is the tallest mountain in the Kyrgyz Ala-Too Range and is an Ultra with a prominence of 2231m.

The mountain is situated between the Ala-Archa River to the west and the Alamedin River to the east.

== History ==
The peak is named after the Russian geographer Peter Semenov-Tian-Shansky.

== See also ==
- List of ultras of Central Asia
