= Vladimir Mikhaylov =

Vladimir Mikhaylov may refer to:

- Vladimir Mikhaylov (footballer) (1939–2026), Russian football player and coach
- Vladimir Mikhaylov (general) (born 1943), Russian air force general
