= Oleg Mikhaylov =

Oleg Mikhaylov may refer to:

- Oleg Mykhaylov (born 1968), Ukrainian sport shooter
- Oleg Mikhailov (politician) (born 1987), Russian politician
- Oleg Mikhailov (footballer) (born 1930), Soviet footballer
- Oleg Mikhailov (writer) (1932–2013), Soviet and Russian writer
- Oleg Mikhailov (actor) (1936–1991), Soviet actor
- Oleg Mikhailov (screenwriter) (born 1975), Russian and Ukrainian screenwriter
