= Vasily Davydov =

Russian psychologist

Vasily Vasilovich Davydov (31 August 1930 – 19 March 1998) was a Russian psychologist who led the Psychological Institute of the Russian Academy of Education.

In 1958 he joined Georgy Shchedrovitsky in founding the Commission for The Study of The Psychology of Thought and Logic

In the 1980s he was Director of the Institute of General and Pedagogical Psychology in Moscow. Here he established a 'laboratory' where Felix Mikhailov, Vladimir Bibler, A.S. Arsen'ev and Georgy Shchedrovitsky. In 1983 he was removed from the institute and the laboratory was dissolved.

He was a student and close friend of Evald Ilyenkov.
