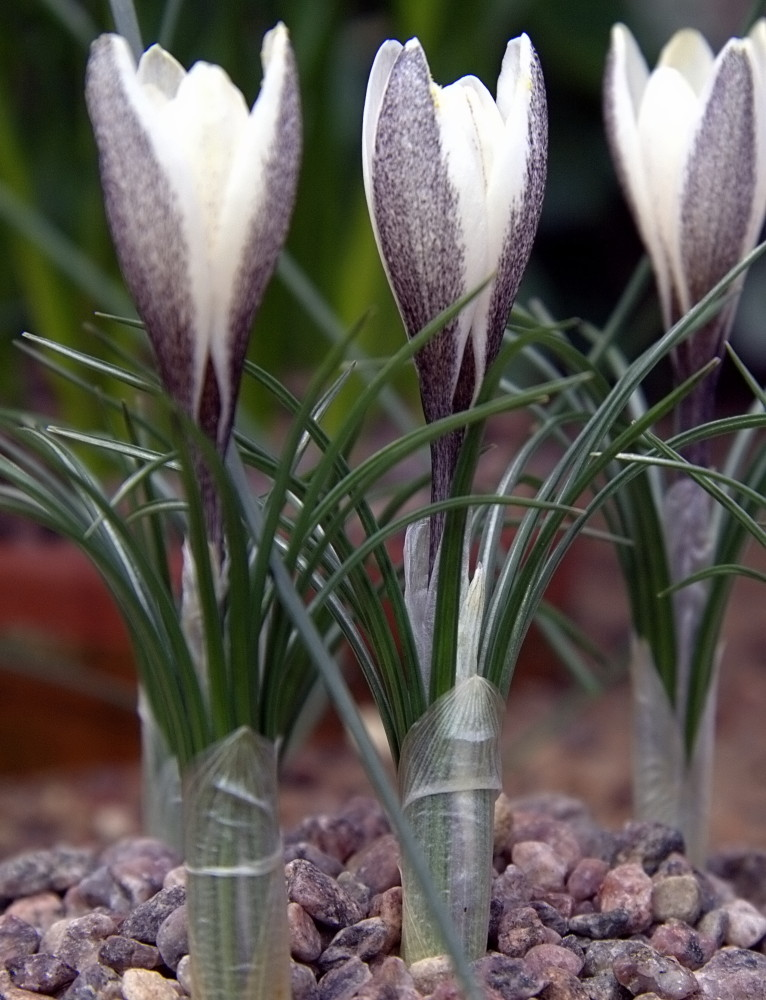
- Crocus alatavicus

Scientific classification
- Kingdom: Plantae
- Clade: Tracheophytes
- Clade: Angiosperms
- Clade: Monocots
- Order: Asparagales
- Family: Iridaceae
- Genus: Crocus
- Species: C. alatavicus

Binomial name
- Crocus alatavicus Regel & Semen.

= Crocus alatavicus =

Species of flowering plant

Crocus alatavicus is a species of flowering plant in the genus Crocus of the family Iridaceae. It is a cormous perennial native to Kazakhstan, Kyrgyzstan, Tajikistan, Uzbekistan, and Xinjiang.

== Description ==
Crocus alatavicus is a herbaceous perennial geophyte growing from a corm. The medium-sized corm has a tunic with parallel fibers. The narrow leaves number 8 to 20 and are short during flowering. The white flowers have gray to black-violet spotting on the outside surfaces. The flower throats are yellow and so are the anthers. The stigma is yellow to orange.

Crocus alatavicus is found growing in the mountains among stones and in scrub, often in association with Colchicum luteum; flowering occurs in February to May depending on the altitude.

Plants are easy to grow in a bulb frame if the soil remains dry during summer. It is winter hardy to USDA zone 4.
