= Alexander Mikhaylov =

Alexander Mikhaylov is the name of:

- Aleksandr Mikhailov (astronomer) (1888–1983), Russian astronomer
- Alexander Mikhailov (revolutionary) (1855–1884), Russian revolutionary
- Alexander Mikhailov (information scientist) (1905–1988), Russian information scientist
- Aleksandr Mikhaylov (footballer) (born 2000), Russian football player
- Aleksandr Mikhaylov (skier) (born 1970), Russian freestyle skier
- Alexander Mikhailov (politician) (1951–2020), governor of Kursk Oblast, Russia
- Aleksandr Mikhailov (actor) (born 1944), Russian actor
- Aleksandr Mikhaylov (actor, born 1922), in films such as Alyosha Ptitsyn Grows Up
- Alexander Mikhaylov (rally driver), in events such as the 2016 European Rally Championship

== See also ==
- Mikhaylov (disambiguation)
