= Felix Mikhailov =

Russian psychologist

Felix Trofimovich Mikhailov (Russian: Феликс Трофимович Михайлов; 12 April 1930 – 22 February 2006) was a Russian psychologist.

In the 1980s he worked at the Institute of General and Pedagogical Psychology in Moscow under Vasily Davydov.

== Works ==
- The Riddle of the Self (Russian, 1976, English translation 1980)
- ObschScestvennoe soznanie i samosoznanie individa (Social Consciousness and the Self-Consciousness of the Individual), Moscow, Nauka, 1990.
