= Korona Peak =

Mountain in northern Kyrgyzstan

- Pik Korona
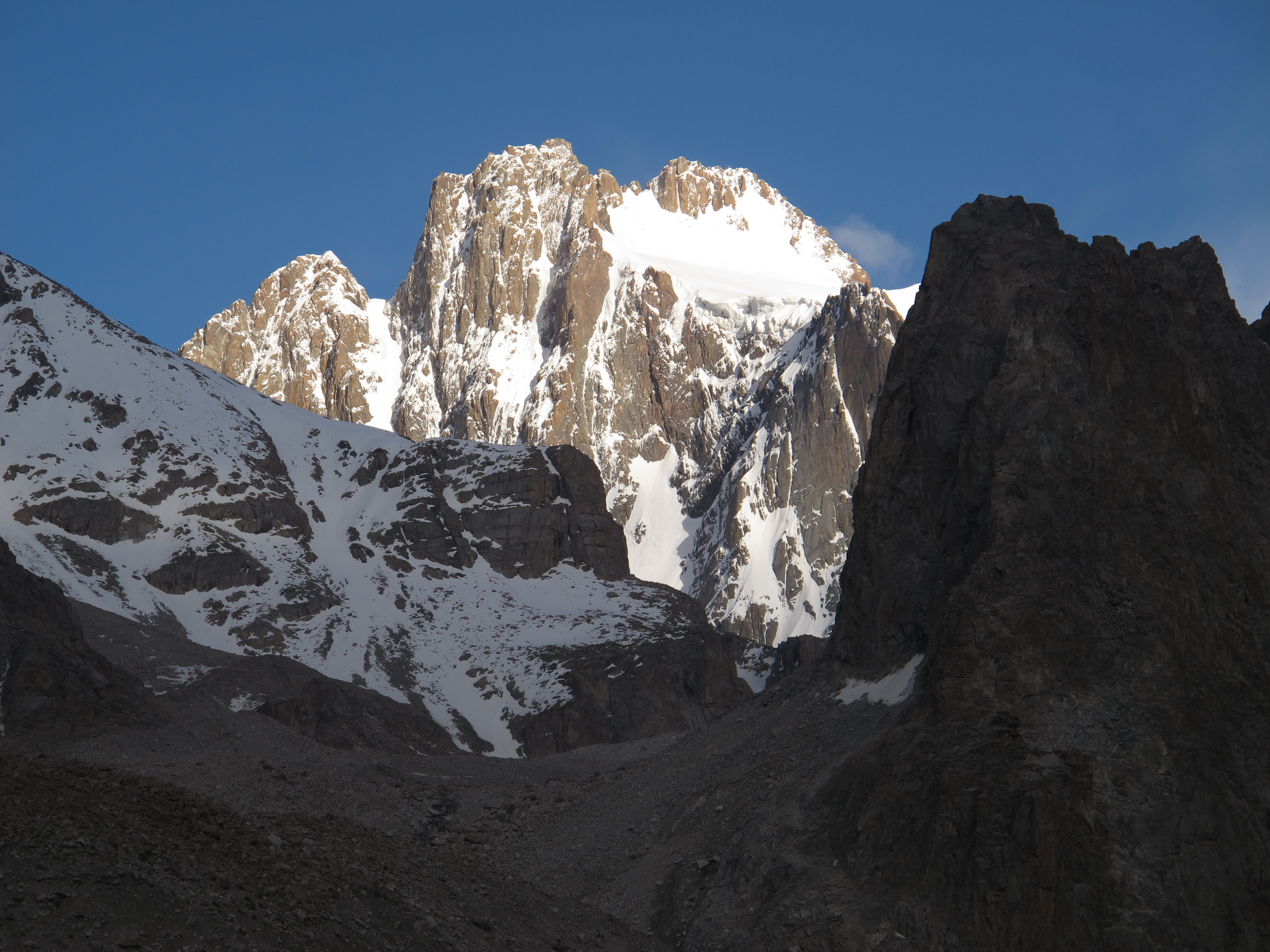
- Korona Peak viewed from Ratcek Hut to the northwest

Highest point
- Elevation: 4,860 m (15,940 ft)
- Coordinates: 42°30′24″N 74°34′1″E

Geography
- Location within Kyrgyzstan
- Location: Kyrgyzstan
- Parent range: Kyrgyz Ala-Too Range, Tian Shan

Korona Peak (Russian: пик Корона, romanized: Pik Korona, lit. 'Crown Peak') is a mountain in the Kyrgyz Ala-Too Range of the Tian Shan. It is located in Ala Archa National Park in Kyrgyzstan. It is named for its crown-like appearance.

Ak-Sai Glacier lies on its southwest flank.
