= Konstantin Mikhaylov (journalist) =

Russian writer and journalist (born 1965)

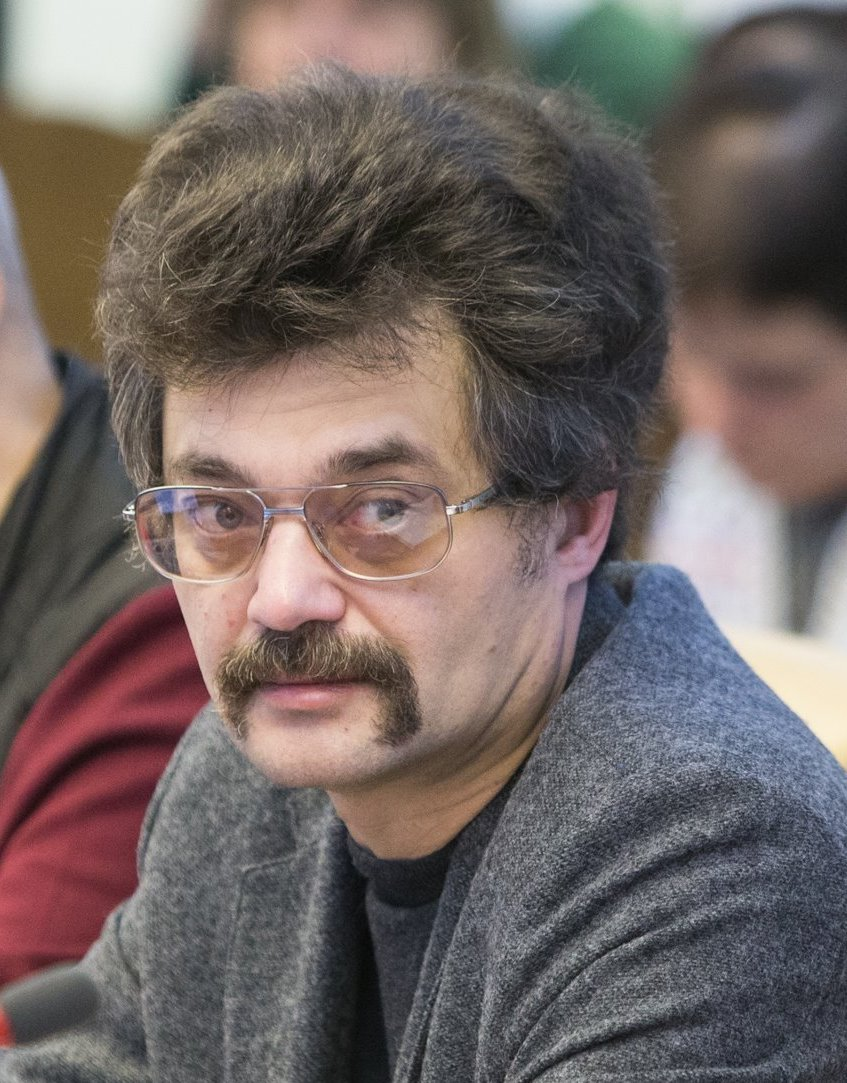
Konstantin Mikhaylov in 2015

Konstantin Petrovich Mikhaylov (Russian: Кoнстантин Петрович Михайлoв; born 24 October 1965 in Moscow, RSFSR, USSR) is a Russian journalist, writer, ethnographer and social activist. One of the initiators of the public movement Arkhnadzor (a social movement, a voluntary non-profit association of citizens who wish to contribute to the preservation of historical monuments, landscapes and species of Moscow), a member of its Coordination Council. Since 2012, he has been a member of the Civic Chamber of the Russian Federation and a member of the Presidential Council for Culture and Arts.

His daughter is an actress working in puppet theater Shadow.
